= Ancient Greek religion =

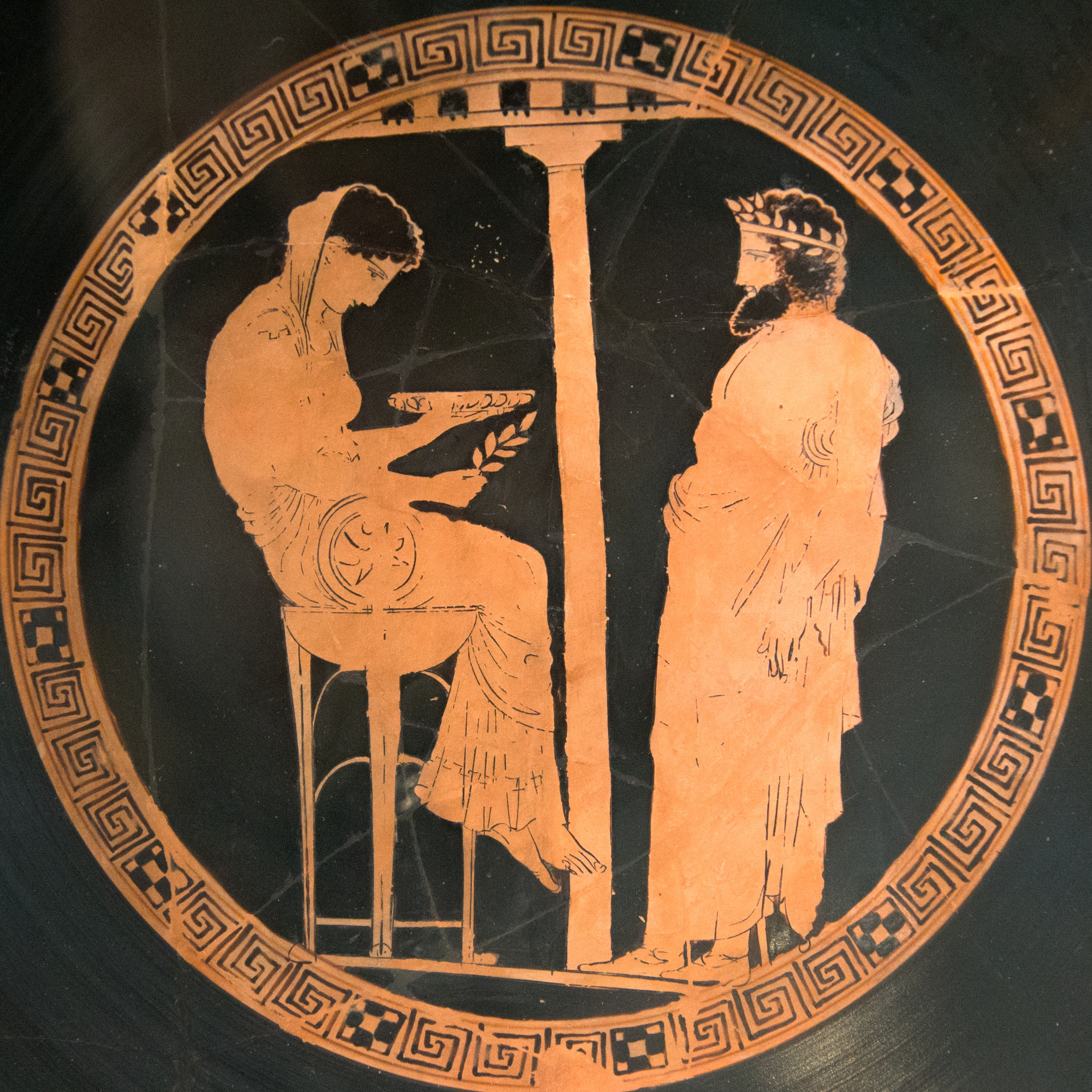
Aegeus at right consults the Pythia or oracle of Delphi. Vase, 440–430 BC. He was told "Do not loosen the bulging mouth of the wineskin until you have reached the height of Athens, lest you die of grief", which at first he did not understand.

Religious practices in ancient Greece were polytheistic, encompassing a collection of beliefs, rituals, and mythology, in the form of both popular public religion and cult practices. The application of the modern concept of "religion" to ancient cultures has been questioned as anachronistic. The ancient Greeks did not have a word for 'religion' in the modern sense. Likewise, no Greek writer is known to have classified either the gods or the cult practices into separate 'religions'. Instead, for example, Herodotus speaks of the Hellenes as having "common shrines of the gods and sacrifices, and the same kinds of customs".

Most ancient Greeks recognized the twelve major Olympian gods and goddesses—Zeus, Hera, Poseidon, Demeter, Athena, Ares, Aphrodite, Apollo, Artemis, Hephaestus, Hermes, and either Hestia or Dionysus—although philosophies such as Stoicism and some forms of Platonism used language that seems to assume a single transcendent deity. The worship of these deities, and several others, was found across the Greek world, though they often have different epithets that distinguished aspects of the deity, and often reflect the absorption of other local deities into the pan-Hellenic scheme.

The religious practices of the Greeks extended beyond mainland Greece, to the islands and coasts of Ionia in Asia Minor, to Magna Graecia (Sicily and southern Italy), and to scattered Greek colonies in the Western Mediterranean, such as Massalia (Marseille). Early Italian religions such as the Etruscan religion were influenced by Greek religion and subsequently influenced much of the ancient Roman religion.

== Beliefs ==
"There was no centralization of authority over Greek religious practices and beliefs; change was regulated only at the civic level. Thus, the phenomenon we are studying is not in fact an organized 'religion'. Instead we might think of the beliefs and practices of Greeks in relation to the gods as a group of closely related 'religious dialects' that resembled each other far more than they did those of non-Greeks."

=== Theology ===
Ancient Greek theology was polytheistic, based on the assumption that there were many gods and goddesses, as well as a range of lesser supernatural beings of various types. There was a hierarchy of deities, with Zeus, the king of the gods, having a level of control over all the others, although he was not almighty. Some deities had dominion over certain aspects of nature. For instance, Zeus was the sky-god, sending thunder and lightning, Poseidon ruled over the sea and earthquakes, Hades projected his remarkable power throughout the realms of death and the Underworld, and Helios controlled the sun. Other deities ruled over abstract concepts; for instance Aphrodite controlled love. All significant deities were visualized as "human" in form, although often able to transform themselves into animals or natural phenomena.

While being immortal, the gods were certainly not all-good or even all-powerful. They had to obey fate, known to Greek mythology as the Moirai, which overrode any of their divine powers or wills. For instance, in mythology, it was Odysseus' fate to return home to Ithaca after the Trojan War, and the gods could only lengthen his journey and make it harder for him, not stop him.

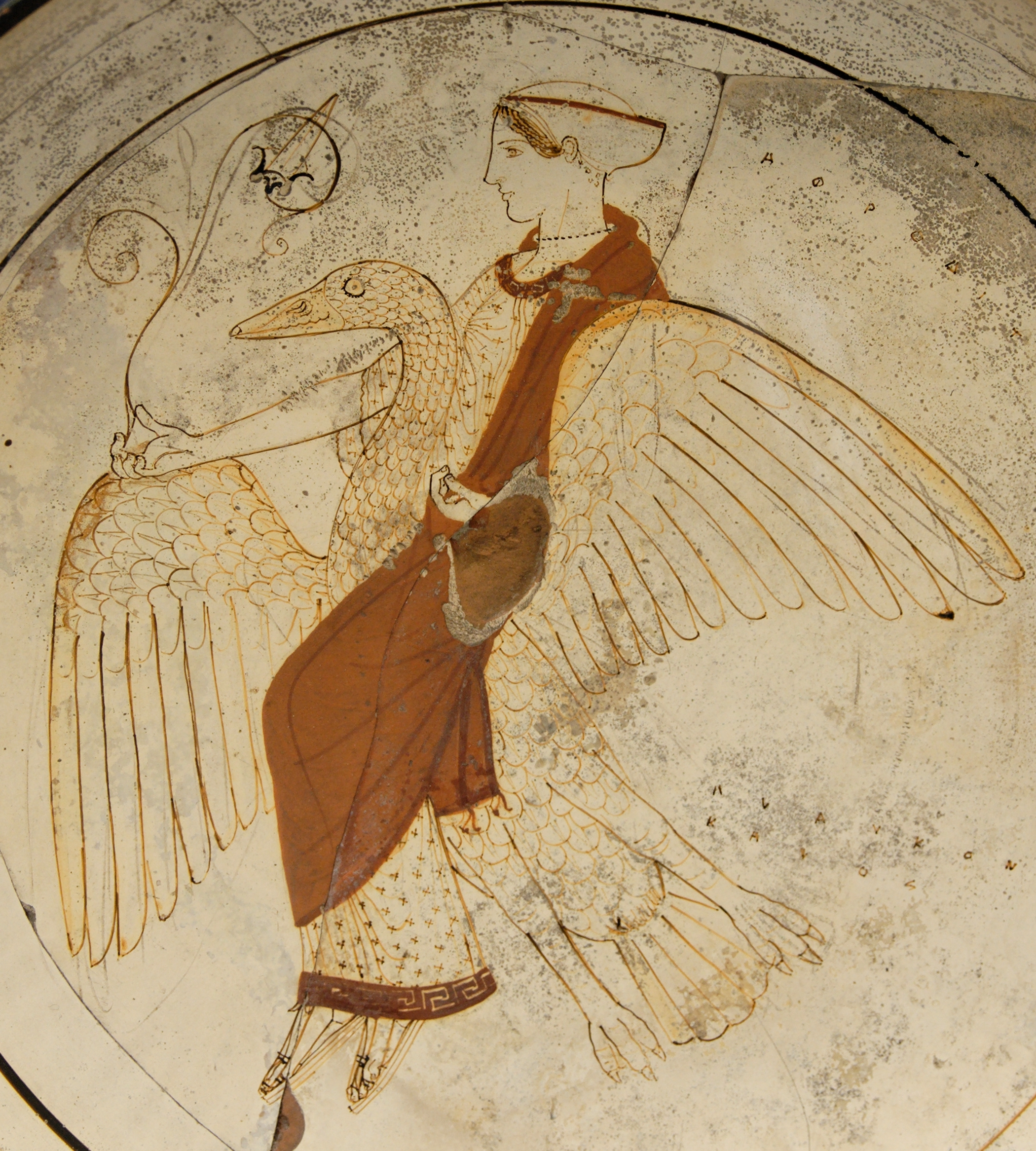
Aphrodite riding a swan: Attic white-ground red-figured kylix, c. 460 BC, found at Kameiros (Rhodes)

The gods had human vices and many behaved with arguably less morality than a typical human. They interacted with humans, sometimes even spawning children—called demigods—with them. At times, certain gods would be opposed to others, and they would try to outdo each other. In the Iliad, Aphrodite, Ares, and Apollo support the Trojan side in the Trojan War, while Hera, Athena, and Poseidon support the Greeks (see theomachy).

Some gods were specifically associated with a certain city. Athena was associated with Athens, Apollo with Delphi and Delos, Zeus with Olympia and Aphrodite with Corinth. But other gods were also worshipped in these cities. Other deities were associated with nations outside of Greece; Poseidon was associated with Aethiopia and Troy, and Ares with Thrace.

Identity of names was not a guarantee of a similar cultus; the Greeks themselves were well aware that the Artemis worshipped at Sparta, the virgin huntress, was a very different deity from the Artemis who was a many-breasted fertility goddess at Ephesus. Though worship of the major deities spread from one locality to another, and though most larger cities had temples to several major gods, the identification of different gods with different places remained strong to the end.

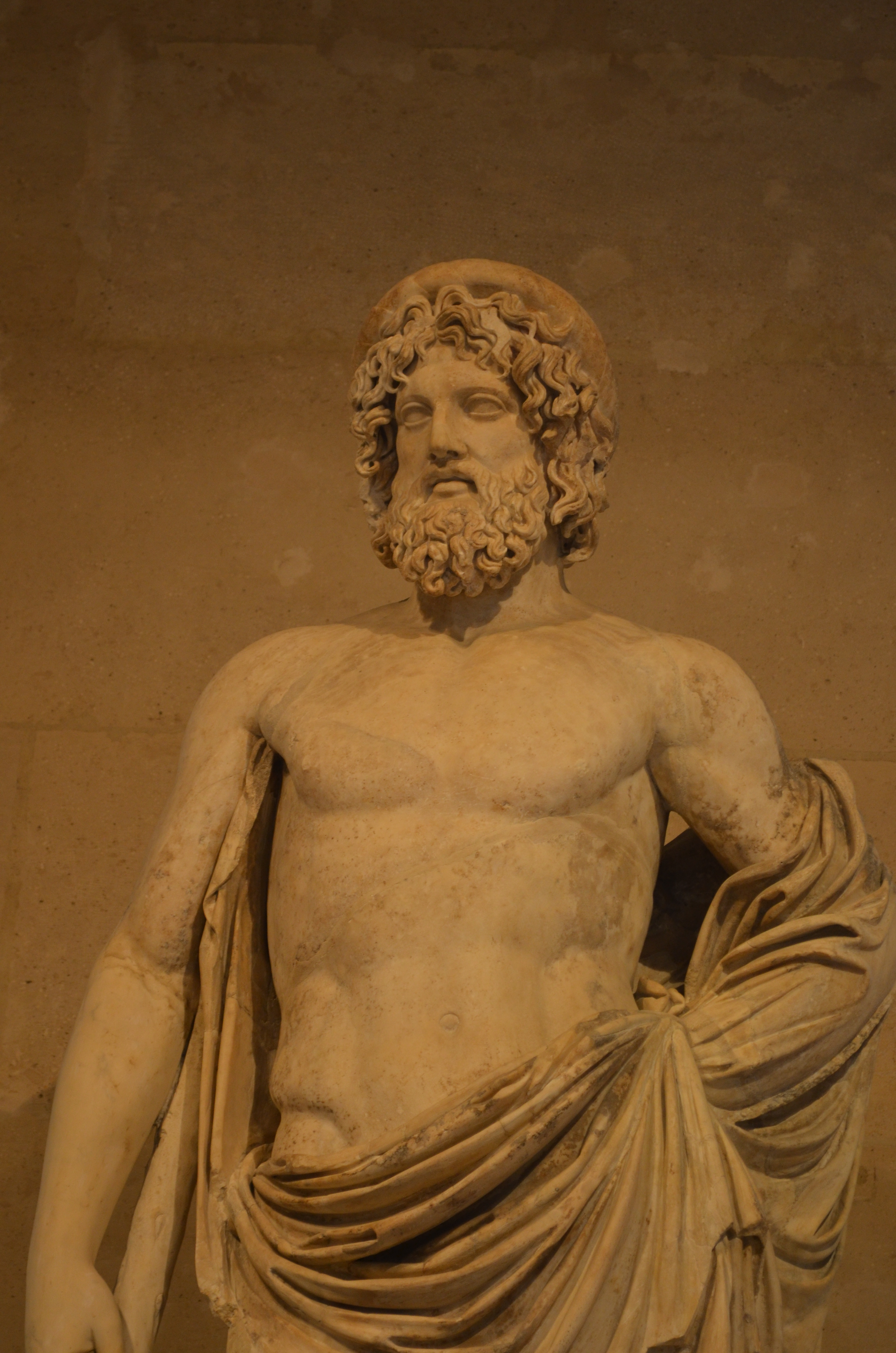
Asclepios, god of medicine. Marble Roman copy (2nd century AD) of a Greek original of the early 4th century BC. Asclepios was not one of the Twelve Olympians, but popular with doctors like Pausanias, and their patients.

Ancient sources for Greek religion tell a good deal about cult but very little about creed, in no small measure because the Greeks in general considered what one believed to be much less important than what one did.

=== Afterlife ===
The Greeks believed in an underworld inhabited by the spirits of the dead. It was ruled by Hades, a brother of Zeus, and was itself sometimes known as Hades. Tartarus was a place of torment for the damned, and Elysium a place of pleasures for the virtuous. In the early Mycenaean religion all the dead went to Hades, but the rise of mystery cults in the Archaic age led to the development of places such as Tartarus and Elysium.

A few Greeks, like Achilles, Alcmene, Amphiaraus, Ganymede, Ino, Melicertes, Menelaus, Peleus, and a great number of those who fought in the Trojan and Theban wars, were considered to have been physically immortalized and brought to live forever in either Elysium, the Islands of the Blessed, heaven, the ocean, or beneath the ground. Such beliefs are found in the most ancient Greek sources, such as Homer and Hesiod. This belief remained strong even into the Christian era. For most people at the moment of death there was, however, no hope of anything but continued existence as a disembodied soul.

Some Greeks, such as the philosophers Pythagoras and Plato, also embraced the idea of reincarnation, though this was only accepted by a few. Epicurus taught that the soul was simply atoms which were dissolved at death, so one ceased to exist on dying.

=== Mythology ===
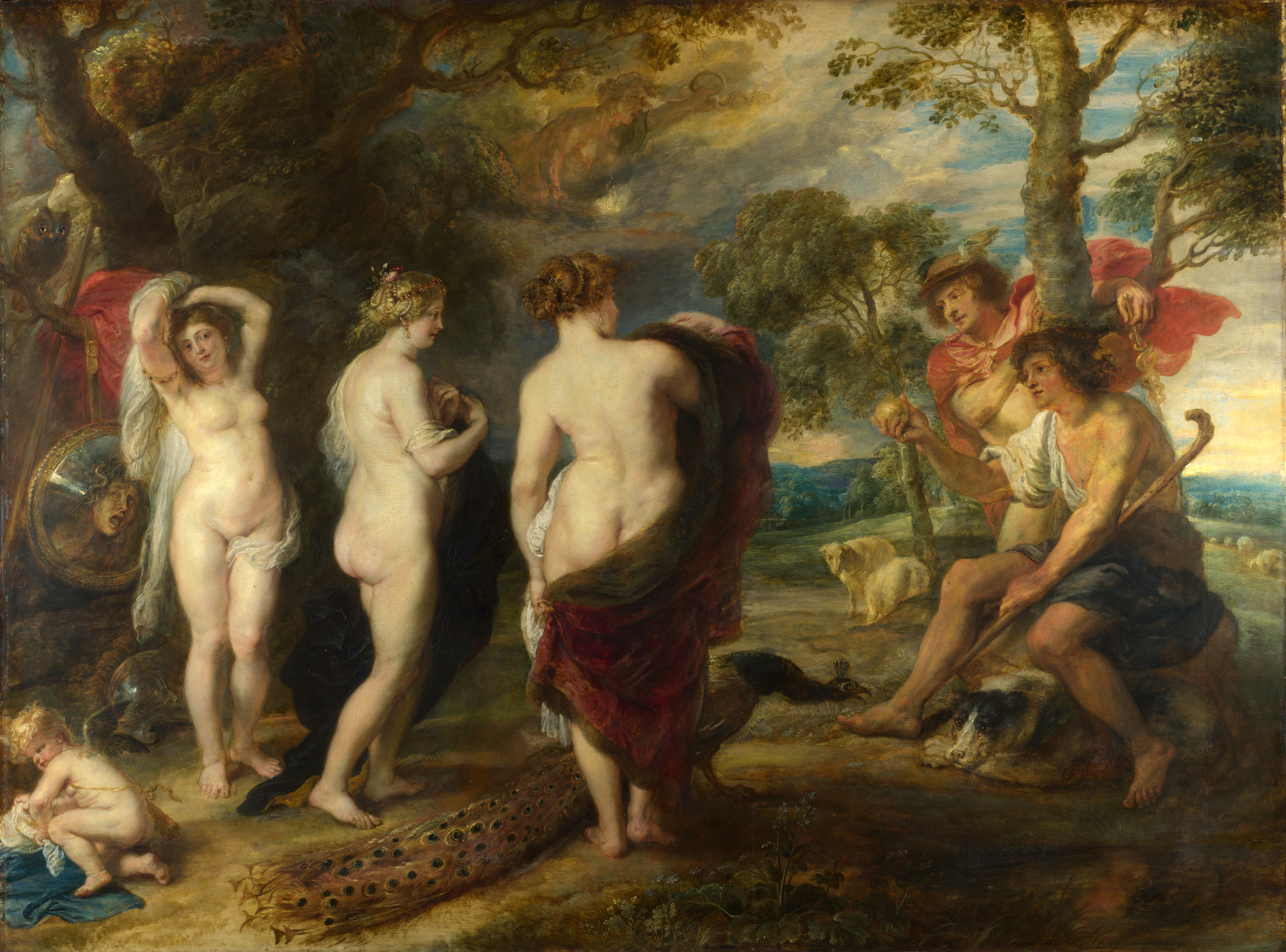
The Judgment of Paris by Peter Paul Rubens (c. 1636), depicting the goddesses Hera, Aphrodite and Athena, in a competition that causes the Trojan War. This Baroque painting shows the continuing fascination with Greek mythology

The Birth of Venus (c. 1485) by Sandro Botticelli, Uffizi, Florence

Greek religion had an extensive mythology. It consisted largely of stories of the gods and how they interacted with humans. Myths often revolved around heroes and their actions, such as Heracles and his twelve labors, Odysseus and his voyage home, Jason and the quest for the Golden Fleece and Theseus and the Minotaur.

Many species existed in Greek mythology. Chief among these were the gods and humans, though the Titans (who predated the Olympian gods) also frequently appeared in Greek myths. Lesser species included the half-man-half-horse centaurs, the nature-based nymphs (tree nymphs were dryads, sea nymphs were Nereids) and the half-man, half-goat satyrs. Some creatures in Greek mythology were monstrous, such as the one-eyed giant Cyclopes, the sea beast Scylla, whirlpool Charybdis, Gorgons, and the half-man, half-bull Minotaur.

There was no set Greek cosmogony, or creation myth. Different religious groups believed that the world had been created in different ways. One Greek creation myth was told in Hesiod's Theogony. It stated that at first there was only a primordial deity called Chaos, after which came various other primordial gods, such as Gaia, Tartarus and Eros, who then gave birth to more gods, the Titans, who then gave birth to the first Olympians.

The mythology largely survived and was expanded to form the later Roman mythology. The Greeks and Romans were literate societies, and much mythology, although initially shared orally, was written down in the forms of epic poetry (such as the Iliad, the Odyssey and the Argonautica) and plays (such as Euripides' The Bacchae and Aristophanes' The Frogs). The mythology became popular in Christian post-Renaissance Europe, where it was often used as a basis for the works of artists like Botticelli, Michelangelo and Rubens.

=== Morality ===
One of the most important moral concepts to the Greeks was aversion to hubris. Hubris constituted many things, from rape to desecration of a corpse, and was a crime in Athens. Although pride and vanity were not considered sins themselves, the Greeks emphasized moderation. Pride only became hubris when it went to extremes, like any other vice. The same was thought of eating and drinking. Anything done to excess was not considered proper. Ancient Greeks placed, for example, importance on athletics and intellect equally. In fact many of their competitions included both. Pride was not evil until it became all-consuming or hurtful to others.

=== Sacred texts ===
The Greeks had no religious texts they regarded as "revealed" scriptures of sacred origin, but very old texts including Homer's Iliad and Odyssey, and the Homeric hymns (regarded as later productions today), Hesiod's Theogony and Works and Days, and Pindar's Odes were regarded as authoritative and perhaps inspired; they usually begin with an invocation to the Muses for inspiration. Plato even wanted to exclude the myths from his ideal state described in the Republic because of their low moral tone.

While some traditions, such as Mystery cults, upheld certain texts as canonic within their praxis, such texts were respected but not necessarily accepted as canonic outside their circle. In this field, of particular importance are certain texts referring to Orphic cults: multiple copies, ranging from between 450 BC and 250 AD, have been found in various parts of the Greek world. Even the words of the oracles never became a sacred text. Other texts were specially composed for religious events, and some have survived within the lyric tradition; although they had a cult function, they were bound to performance and never developed into a common, standard prayer form comparable to the Christian Pater Noster. An exception to this rule were the already named Orphic and Mystery rituals, which, in this, set themselves aside from the rest of the Greek religious system. Finally, some texts called hierói lógoi (Ancient Greek: ἱεροί λόγοι) (sacred texts) by the ancient sources, originated from outside the Greek world, or were supposedly adopted in remote times, representing yet more different traditions within the Greek belief system.

== Practices ==
=== Ceremonies ===
The lack of a unified priestly class meant that a unified, canonic form of the religious texts or practices never existed; just as there was no unified, common sacred text for the Greek belief system, there was no standardization of practices. Instead, religious practices were organized on local levels, with priests normally being magistrates for the city or village, or gaining authority from one of the many sanctuaries. Pausanias notes that the priest of the temple of Athena Alea at Tegea was a boy, who held office only until reaching the age of puberty. Some priestly functions, like the care for a particular local festival, could be given by tradition to a certain family. To a large extent, in the absence of "scriptural" sacred texts, religious practices derived their authority from tradition, and "every omission or deviation arouses deep anxiety and calls forth sanctions".

Greek ceremonies and rituals were mainly performed at altars, which were never inside temples, but often just outside, or standing by themselves somewhere. These were typically devoted to one or a few gods, and supported a statue of the particular deity. Votive deposits were left at the altar, such as food, drinks, as well as precious objects. Sometimes animal sacrifices were performed here, with most of the flesh taken for eating and the offal burnt as an offering to the gods. Libations, often of wine, would be offered to the gods as well, not only at shrines, but also in everyday life, such as during a symposium.

One rite of passage was the amphidromia, celebrated on the fifth or seventh day after the birth of a child. Childbirth was extremely significant to Athenians, especially if the baby was a boy. One ceremony was pharmakos, a ritual involving expelling a symbolic scapegoat such as a slave or an animal, from a city or village in a time of hardship. It was hoped that by casting out the ritual scapegoat, the hardship would go with it.

=== Sacrifice ===
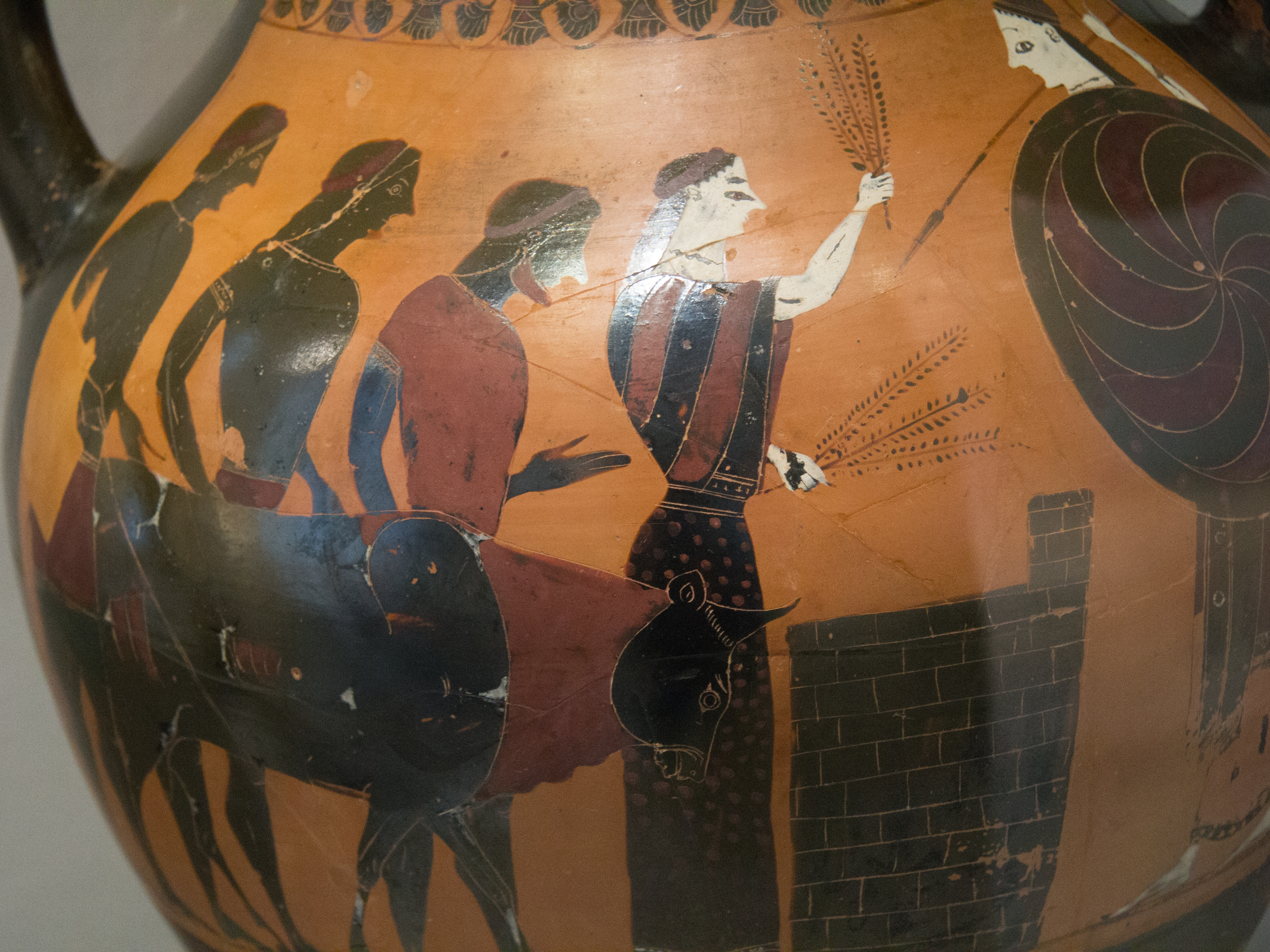
A bull is led to the altar of Athena, whose image is at right. Vase, c. 545 BC.

Worship in Greece typically consisted of sacrificing domestic animals at the altar with hymn and prayer. The altar was outside any temple building, and might not be associated with a temple at all. The animal, which should be perfect of its kind, was decorated with garlands and the like, and led in procession to the altar; a girl with a basket on her head containing the concealed knife led the way. After various rituals, the animal was slaughtered over the altar. As it fell, all the women present "[cried] out in high, shrill tones". Its blood was collected and poured over the altar. It was butchered on the spot and various internal organs, bones and other inedible parts burnt as the deity's portion of the offering, while the meat was removed to be prepared for the participants to eat; the leading figures tasted it on the spot. The temple usually kept the skin to sell to tanners. That humans got more use from the sacrifice than the deity did not escape the Greeks, and was often the subject of humor in Greek comedy.

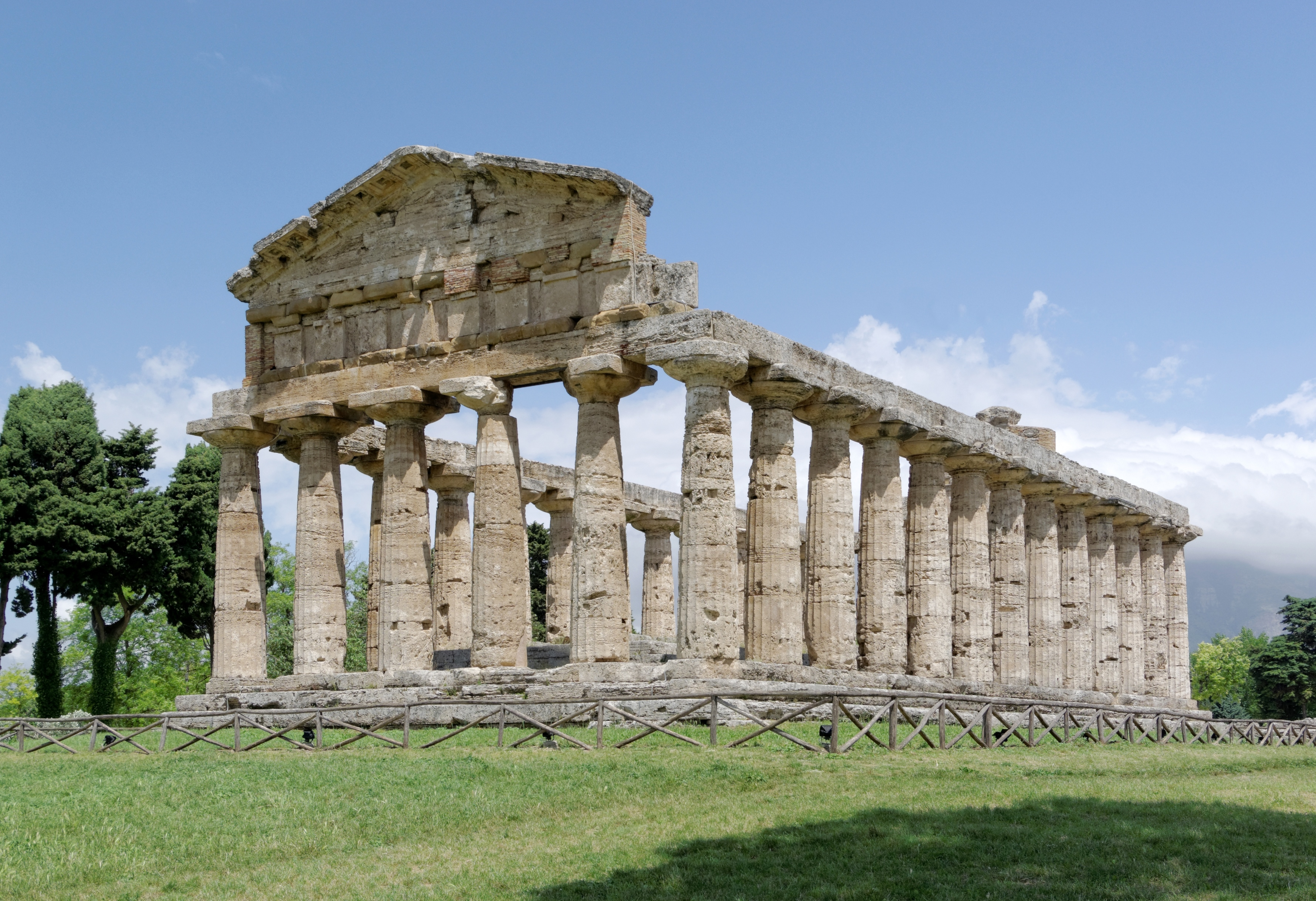
The Temple of Athena, Paestum

The animals used were, in order of preference, bulls or oxen, cows, sheep (the most common sacrifice), goats, pigs (with piglets being the cheapest mammal), and poultry (but rarely other birds or fish). Horses and asses are seen on some vases in the Geometric style (900–750 BC), but are very rarely mentioned in literature; they were relatively late introductions to Greece, and it has been suggested that Greek preferences in this matter were established earlier. The Greeks liked to believe that the animal was glad to be sacrificed, and interpreted various behaviors as showing this. Divination by examining parts of the sacrificed animal was much less important than in Roman or Etruscan religion, or Near Eastern religions, but was practiced, especially of the liver, and as part of the cult of Apollo. Generally, the Greeks put more faith in observing the behavior of birds.

For a smaller and simpler offering, a grain of incense could be thrown on the sacred fire, and outside the cities farmers made simple sacrificial gifts of plant produce as the "first fruits" were harvested. The libation, a ritual pouring of fluid, was part of everyday life, and libations with a prayer were often made at home whenever wine was drunk, with just a part of the cup's contents, the rest being drunk. More formal ones might be made onto altars at temples, and other fluids such as olive oil and honey might be used. Although the grand form of sacrifice called the hecatomb (meaning 100 bulls) might in practice only involve a dozen or so, at large festivals the number of cattle sacrificed could run into the hundreds, and the numbers feasting on them well into the thousands.

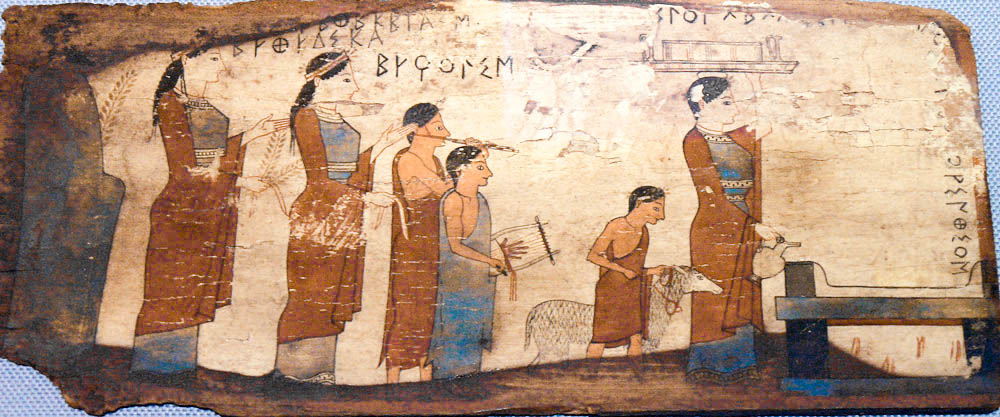
Sacrifice of a lamb on a Pitsa Panel, Corinth, 540–530 BC

The evidence of the existence of such practices is clear in some ancient Greek literature, especially Homer's epics. Throughout the poems, the use of the ritual is apparent at banquets where meat is served, in times of danger or before some important endeavor to gain the gods' favor. For example, in the Odyssey Eumaeus sacrifices a pig with prayer for his unrecognizable master Odysseus. But in the Iliad, which partly reflects very early Greek civilization, not every banquet of the princes begins with a sacrifice.

These sacrificial practices share much with recorded forms of sacrificial rituals known from later. Furthermore, throughout the poem, special banquets are held whenever gods indicated their presence by some sign or success in war. Before setting out for Troy, this type of animal sacrifice is offered. Odysseus offers Zeus a sacrificial ram in vain. The occasions of sacrifice in Homer's epic poems may shed some light onto the view of gods as members of society, rather than external entities, indicating social ties. Sacrificial rituals played a major role in forming the relationship between humans and the divine.

It has been suggested that the Chthonic deities, distinguished from Olympic deities by typically being offered the holocaust mode of sacrifice, where the offering is wholly burnt, may be remnants of the native Pre-Hellenic religion, and that many of the Olympian deities may come from the Proto-Greeks who overran the southern part of the Balkan Peninsula in the late third millennium BC.

=== Festivals ===
Various religious festivals were held in ancient Greece. Many were specific only to a particular deity or city-state. For example, the festival of Lykaia was celebrated in Arcadia in Greece, which was dedicated to the pastoral god Pan. Like the other Panhellenic Games, the ancient Olympic Games were a religious festival, held at the sanctuary of Zeus at Olympia. Other festivals centered on Greek theatre, of which the Dionysia in Athens was the most important. More typical festivals featured a procession, large sacrifices and a feast to eat the offerings, and many included entertainments and customs such as visiting friends, wearing fancy dress and unusual behavior in the streets, sometimes risky for bystanders in various ways. Altogether the year in Athens included some 140 days that were religious festivals of some sort, though they varied greatly in importance.

== Sanctuaries and temples ==
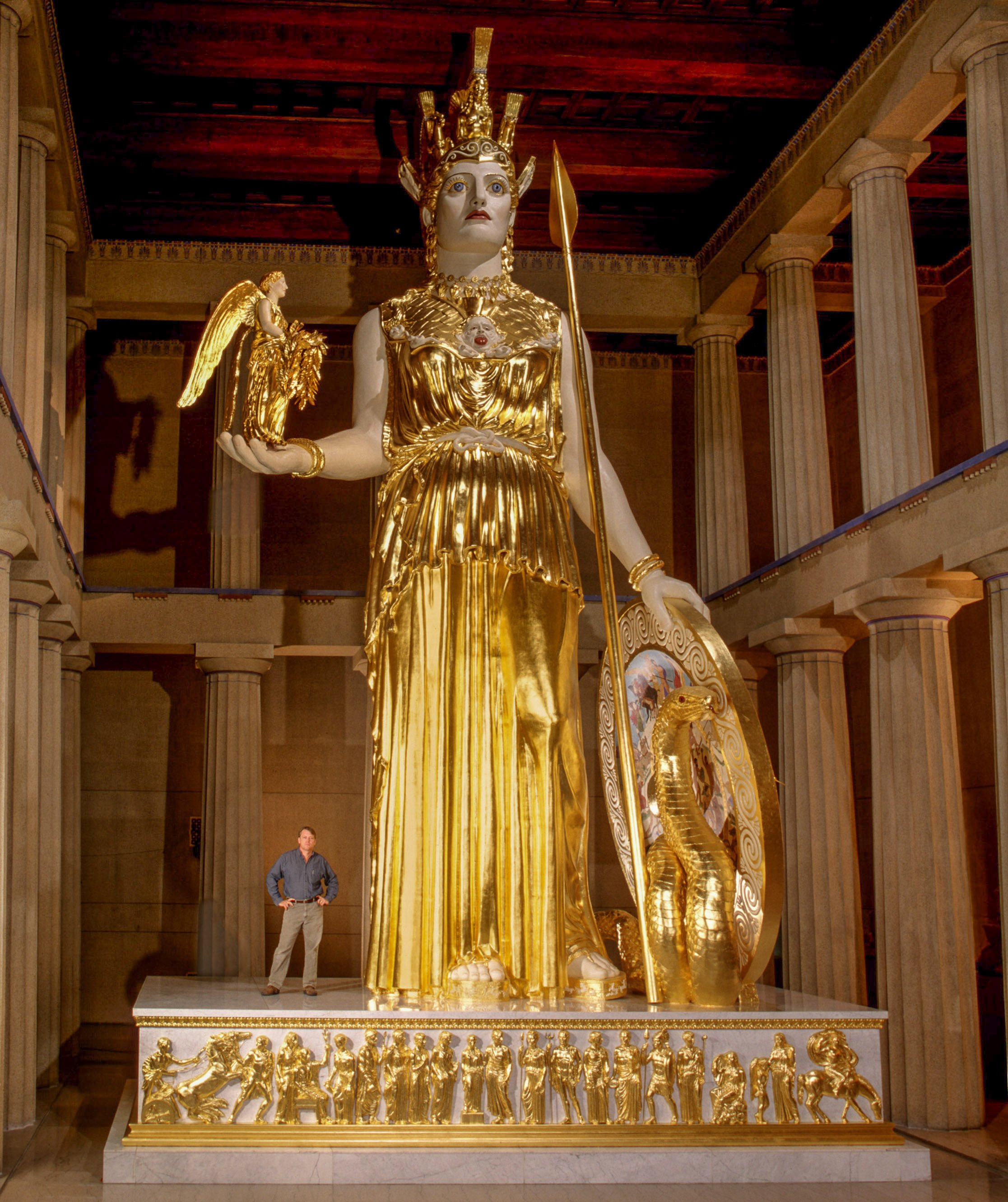
Reproduction of the Athena Parthenos cult image at the original size in the Parthenon in Nashville, Tennessee.

The main Greek temple building sat within a larger precinct or temenos, usually surrounded by a peribolos fence or wall; the whole is usually called a "sanctuary". The Acropolis of Athens is the most famous example, though this was apparently walled as a citadel before a temple was ever built there. The tenemos might include many subsidiary buildings, sacred groves or springs, animals dedicated to the deity, and sometimes people who had taken sanctuary from the law, which some temples offered, for example to runaway slaves.

The earliest Greek sanctuaries probably lacked temple buildings, though our knowledge of these is limited, and the subject is controversial. A typical early sanctuary seems to have consisted of a tenemos, often around a sacred grove, cave, rock (baetyl) or spring, and perhaps defined only by marker stones at intervals, with an altar for offerings. Many rural sanctuaries probably stayed in this style, but the more popular were gradually able to afford a building to house a cult image, especially in cities. This process was certainly under way by the 9th century, and probably started earlier.

The temple interiors did not serve as meeting places, since the sacrifices and rituals dedicated to the respective deity took place outside them, at altars within the wider precinct of the sanctuary, which might be large. As the centuries passed both the inside of popular temples and the area surrounding them accumulated statues and small shrines or other buildings as gifts, and military trophies, paintings and items in precious metals, effectively turning them into a type of museum.

Some sanctuaries offered oracles, people who were believed to receive divine inspiration in answering questions put by pilgrims. The most famous of these by far was the female priestess called the Pythia at the Temple of Apollo at Delphi, and that of Zeus at Dodona, but there were many others. Some dealt only with medical, agricultural or other specialized matters, and not all represented gods, like that of the hero Trophonius at Livadeia.

=== Cult images ===
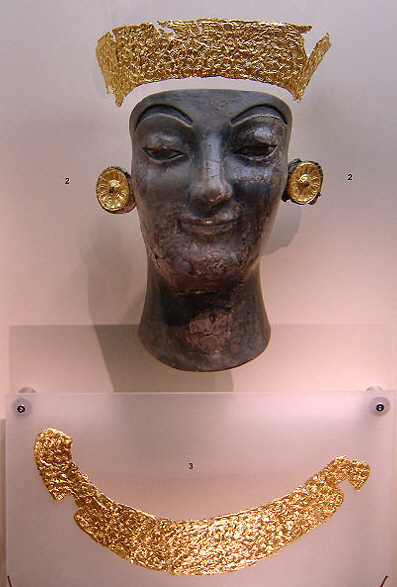
Gold and fire-blackened ivory fragments of a burnt Archaic chryselephantine statue - Delphi Archaeological Museum

The temple was the house of the deity it was dedicated to, who in some sense resided in the cult image in the cella or main room inside, normally facing the only door. The cult image normally took the form of a statue of the deity, typically roughly life-size, but in some cases many times life-size. In early days these were in wood, marble or terracotta, or in the specially prestigious form of a chryselephantine statue using ivory plaques for the visible parts of the body and gold for the clothes, around a wooden framework. The most famous Greek cult images were of this type, including the Statue of Zeus at Olympia, and Phidias's Athena Parthenos in the Parthenon in Athens, both colossal statues, now completely lost. Fragments of two chryselephantine statues from Delphi have been excavated. Bronze cult images were less frequent, at least until Hellenistic times. Early images seem often to have been dressed in real clothes, and at all periods images might wear real jewelry donated by devotees.

The acrolith was another composite form, this time a cost-saving one with a wooden body. A xoanon was a primitive and symbolic wooden image, perhaps comparable to the Hindu lingam; many of these were retained and revered for their antiquity, even when a new statue was the main cult image. Xoana had the advantage that they were easy to carry in processions at festivals. The Trojan Palladium, famous from the myths of the Epic Cycle and supposedly ending up in Rome, was one of these. The sacred boulder or baetyl is another very primitive type, found around the Mediterranean and Ancient Near East.

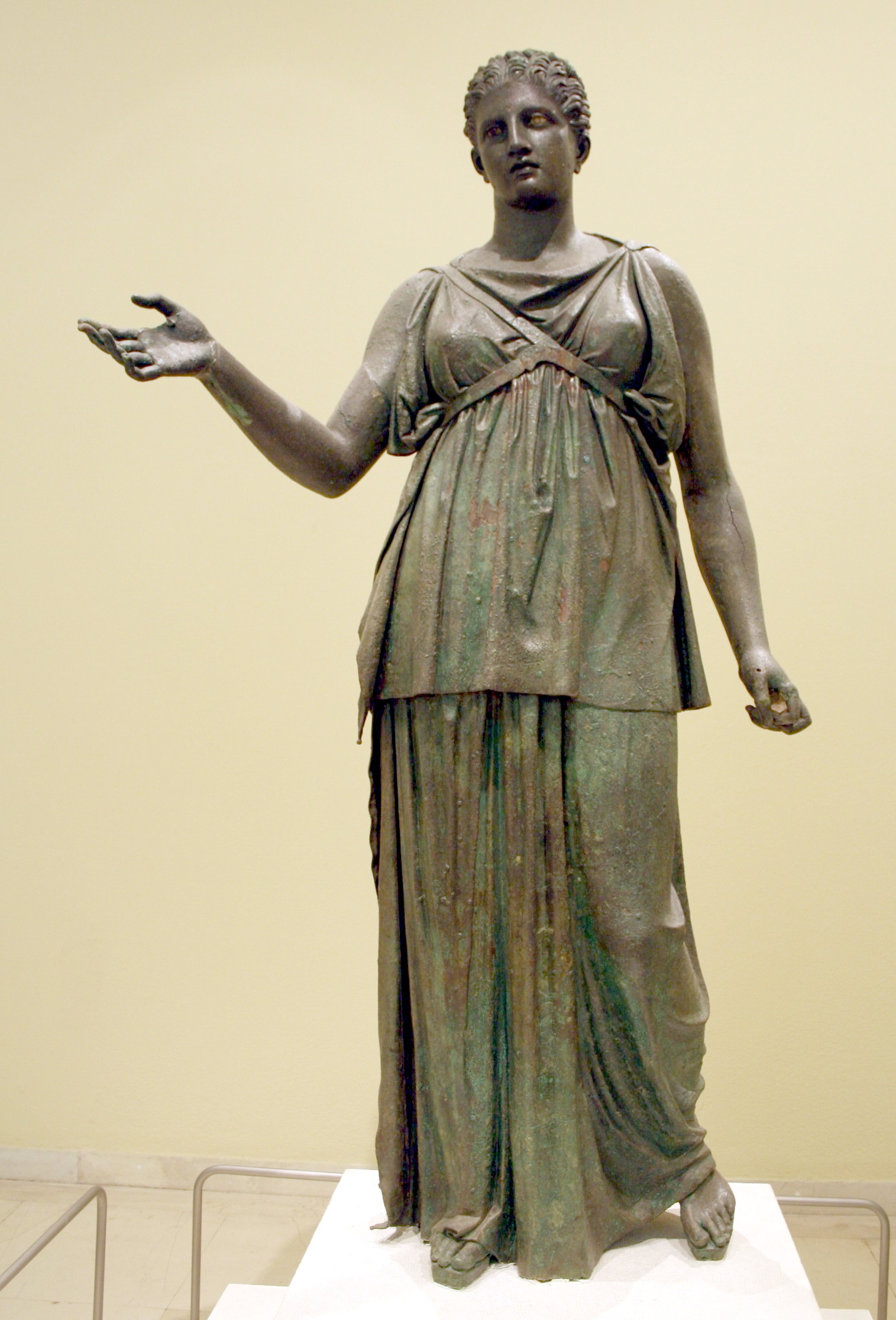
The (first) Piraeus Artemis, probably the cult image from a temple, 4th century BC

Many of the Greek statues well known from Roman marble copies were originally temple cult images, which in some cases, such as the Apollo Barberini, can be credibly identified. A very few actual originals survive, for example, the bronze Piraeus Athena (2.35 m (7.7 ft) high, including a helmet). The image stood on a base, from the 5th century often carved with reliefs.

It used to be thought that access to the cella of a Greek temple was limited to the priests, and it was entered only rarely by other visitors, except perhaps during important festivals or other special occasions. In recent decades this picture has changed, and scholars now stress the variety of local access rules. Pausanias was a gentlemanly traveller of the 2nd-century AD who declares that the special intention of his travels around Greece was to see cult images, and usually managed to do so.

It was typically necessary to make a sacrifice or gift, and some temples restricted access either to certain days of the year, or by class, race, gender (with either men or women forbidden), or even more tightly. Garlic-eaters were forbidden in one temple, in another women unless they were virgins; restrictions typically arose from local ideas of ritual purity or a perceived whim of the deity. In some places visitors were asked to show they spoke Greek; elsewhere Dorians were not allowed entry. Some temples could only be viewed from the threshold. Some temples are said never to be opened at all. But generally Greeks, including slaves, had a reasonable expectation of being allowed into the cella. Once inside the cella it was possible to pray to or before the cult image, and sometimes to touch it; Cicero saw a bronze image of Heracles with its foot largely worn away by the touch of devotees. Famous cult images such as the Statue of Zeus at Olympia functioned as significant visitor attractions.

== Role of women ==
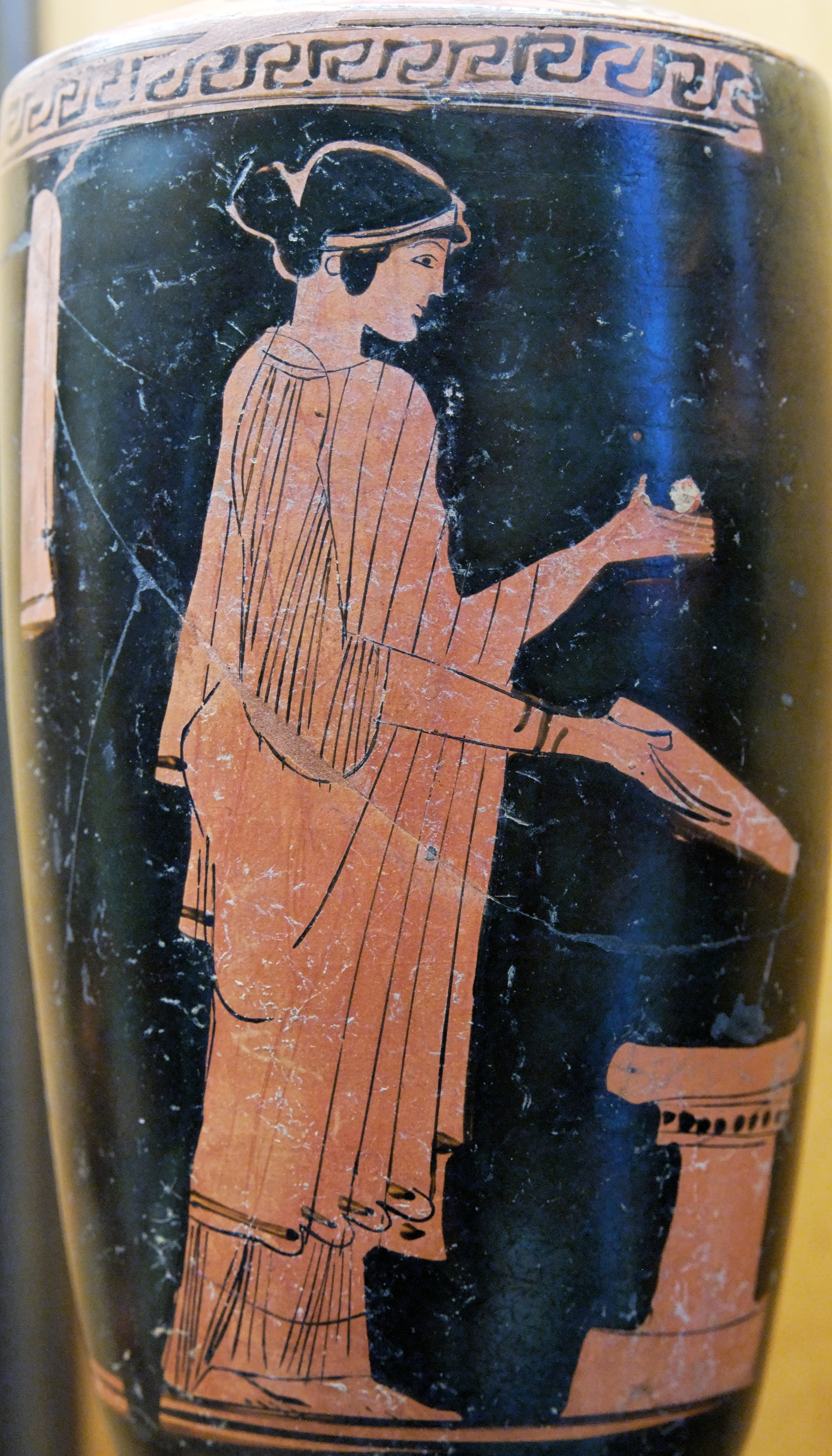
Woman pouring a libation on an altar

In addition to the role that women performed in sacrifices, the only public roles that Greek women could perform were priestesses; either hiereiai, meaning "sacred women", or amphipolis, a term for lesser attendants. As priestesses, they gained social recognition and access to more luxuries than other Greek women who worked or stayed in the home. They were mostly from local elite families; some roles required virgins, who typically only served for a year or so before marriage, while other roles went to married women. Women who voluntarily chose to become priestesses received an increase in social and legal status to the public, and after death, they received a public burial site. Greek priestesses had to be healthy and of a sound mind, the reasoning being that the ones serving the gods had to be as high-quality as their offerings. This was also true of male Greek priests.

It is contested whether there were gendered divisions when it came to serving a particular god or goddess, who was devoted to what god, gods and/or goddesses could have both priests and priestesses to serve them. Gender specifics did come into play when it came to who would perform certain acts of sacrifice or worship. Per the significance of the male or female role to a particular god or goddess, a priest would lead the priestess or the reverse. In some Greek cults priestesses served both gods and goddesses; Pythia, or female Oracle of Apollo at Delphi, and that at Didyma were priestesses, but both were overseen by male priests. The festival of Dionosyus was practiced by both and the god was served by women and female priestesses known as the Gerarai or the venerable ones.

There were segregated religious festivals in Ancient Greece; the Thesmophoria, Plerosia, Kalamaia, Adonia, and Skira were festivals that were only for women. The Thesmophoria festival and many others represented agricultural fertility, which was considered to be closely connected to women. It gave women a religious identity and purpose in Greek religion, in which the role of women in worshipping goddesses Demeter and her daughter Persephone reinforced traditional lifestyles. The festivals relating to agricultural fertility were valued by the polis because this is what they traditionally worked for; women-centered festivals that involved private matters were less important. In Athens the festivals honoring Demeter were included in the calendar and promoted by Athens. They constructed temples and shrines like the Thesmophorion, where women could perform their rites and worship.

== Mystery religions ==
Those who were not satisfied by the public cult of the gods could turn to various mystery religions that operated as cults into which members had to be initiated in order to learn their secrets.

Here, they could find religious consolations that traditional religion could not provide: a chance at mystical awakening, a systematic religious doctrine, a map to the afterlife, a communal worship, and a band of spiritual fellowship.

Some of these mysteries, like the mysteries of Eleusis and Samothrace, were ancient and local. Others were spread from place to place, like the mysteries of Dionysus. During the Hellenistic period and the Roman Empire, exotic mystery religions became widespread, not only in Greece, but all across the empire. Some of these were new creations, such as Mithras, while others had been practiced for hundreds of years before, like the Egyptian mysteries of Osiris.

== History ==
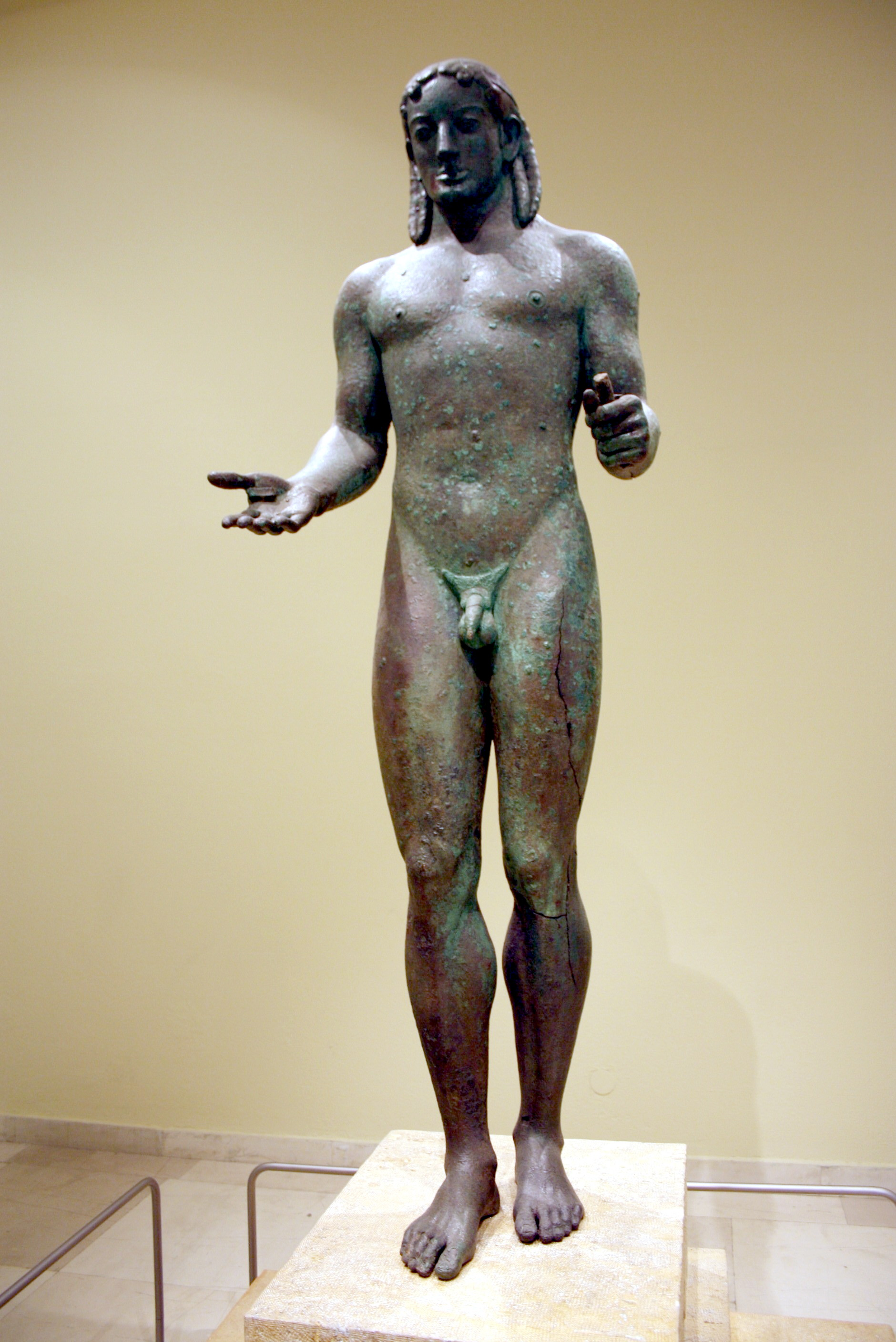
The Piraeus Apollo, c. 525 BC

=== Origins ===
Mainstream Greek religion appears to have developed out of Proto-Indo-European religion and although very little is known about the earliest periods, there are suggestive hints that some local elements go back even further than the Bronze Age or Helladic period to the farmers of Neolithic Greece. There was also clearly cultural evolution from the Late Helladic Mycenaean religion of the Mycenaean civilization. Both the literary settings of some important myths and many important sanctuaries relate to locations that were important Helladic centers that had become otherwise unimportant by Greek times.

The Mycenaeans perhaps treated Poseidon, to them a god of earthquakes as well as the sea, as their chief deity, and forms of his name along with several other Olympians are recognizable in records in Linear B, while Apollo and Aphrodite are absent. Only about half of the Mycenaean pantheon seems to survive the Greek Dark Ages. The archaeological evidence for continuity in religion is far clearer for Crete and Cyprus than the Greek mainland.

Greek religious concepts may also have absorbed the beliefs and practices of earlier, nearby cultures, such as Minoan religion, and other influences came from the Near East, especially via Cyprus and Phoenicia. Herodotus, writing in the 5th century BC, traced many Greek religious practices to Egypt. Robert G. Boling argues that Greek and Ugaritic/Canaanite mythology share many parallel relationships and that historical trends in Canaanite religion can help date works such as Homer's Iliad and Odyssey.

The Great Goddess hypothesis, that a Stone Age religion dominated by a female Great Goddess was displaced by a male-dominated Indo-European hierarchy, has been proposed for Greece as for Minoan Crete and other regions, but has not been in favor with specialists for some decades, though the question remains too poorly evidenced for a clear conclusion; at the least the evidence from Minoan art shows more goddesses than gods. The Twelve Olympians, with Zeus as sky father, certainly have a strong Indo-European flavor; by the time of the epic works of Homer all are well-established, except for Dionysus, but several of the Homeric Hymns, probably composed slightly later, are dedicated to him.

=== Archaic and classical periods ===
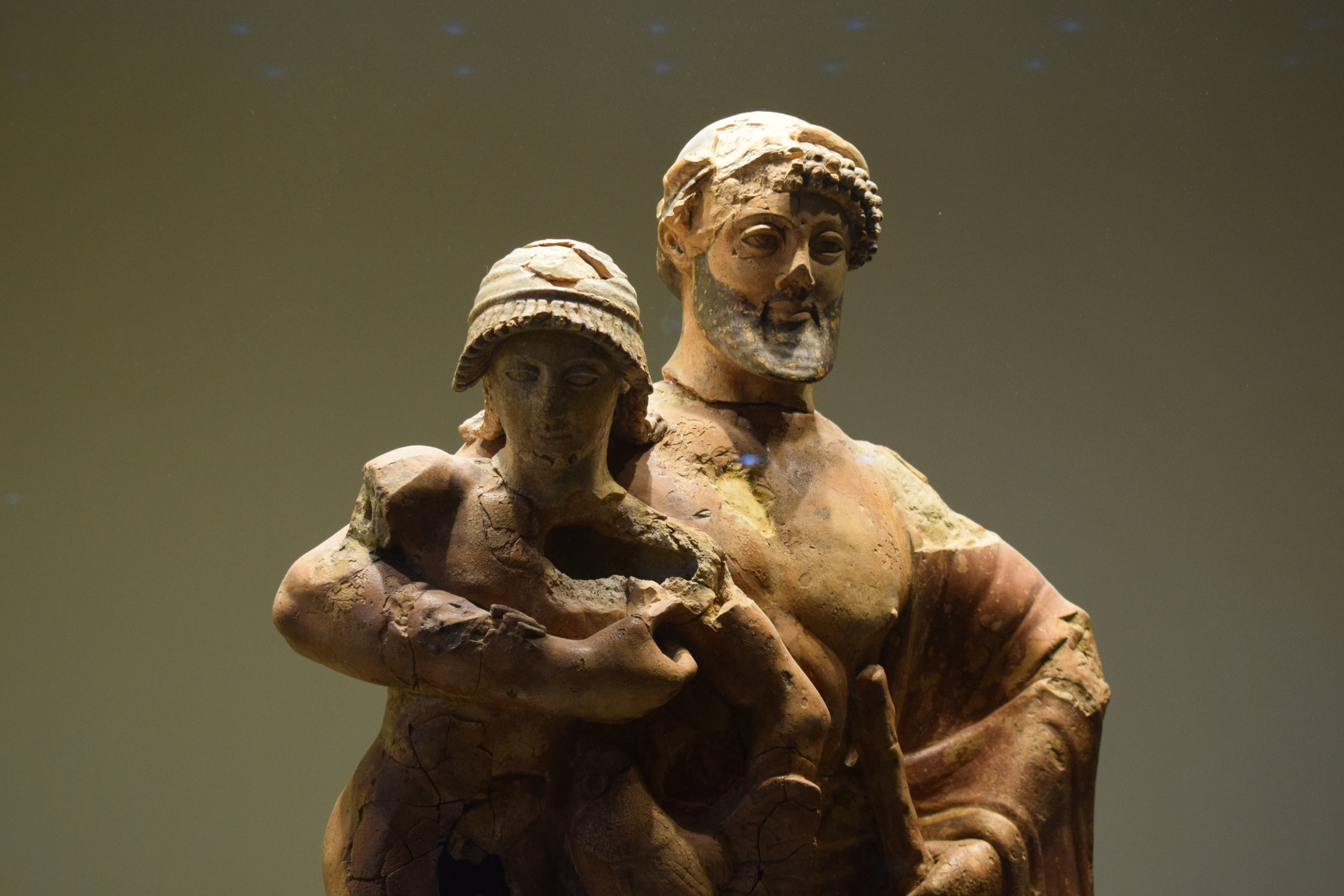
Zeus carrying away Ganymede (Late Archaic terracotta, 480-470 BC)

Archaic and Classical Greece saw the development of flourishing cities and of stone-built temples to the gods, which were rather consistent in design across the Greek world. Religion was closely tied to civic life, and priests were mostly drawn from the local elite. Religious works led the development of Greek sculpture, though apparently not the now-vanished Greek painting. While much religious practice was, as well as personal, aimed at developing solidarity within the polis, a number of important sanctuaries developed a "Panhellenic" status, drawing visitors from all over the Greek world. These served as an essential component in the growth and self-consciousness of Greek nationalism.

The mainstream religion of the Greeks did not go unchallenged within Greece. As Greek philosophy developed its ideas about ethics, the Olympians were found wanting. Several notable philosophers criticized belief in the gods. The earliest of these was Xenophanes, who chastised the gods' human vices and their anthropomorphic depiction. Plato wrote that there was one supreme god, whom he called the "Form of the Good", which he believed was the emanation of perfection in the universe. Plato's disciple Aristotle also disagreed that polytheistic deities existed, because he could not find enough empirical evidence for it. He believed in a Prime Mover, which had set creation going but was not connected to or interested in the universe.

=== Hellenistic period ===
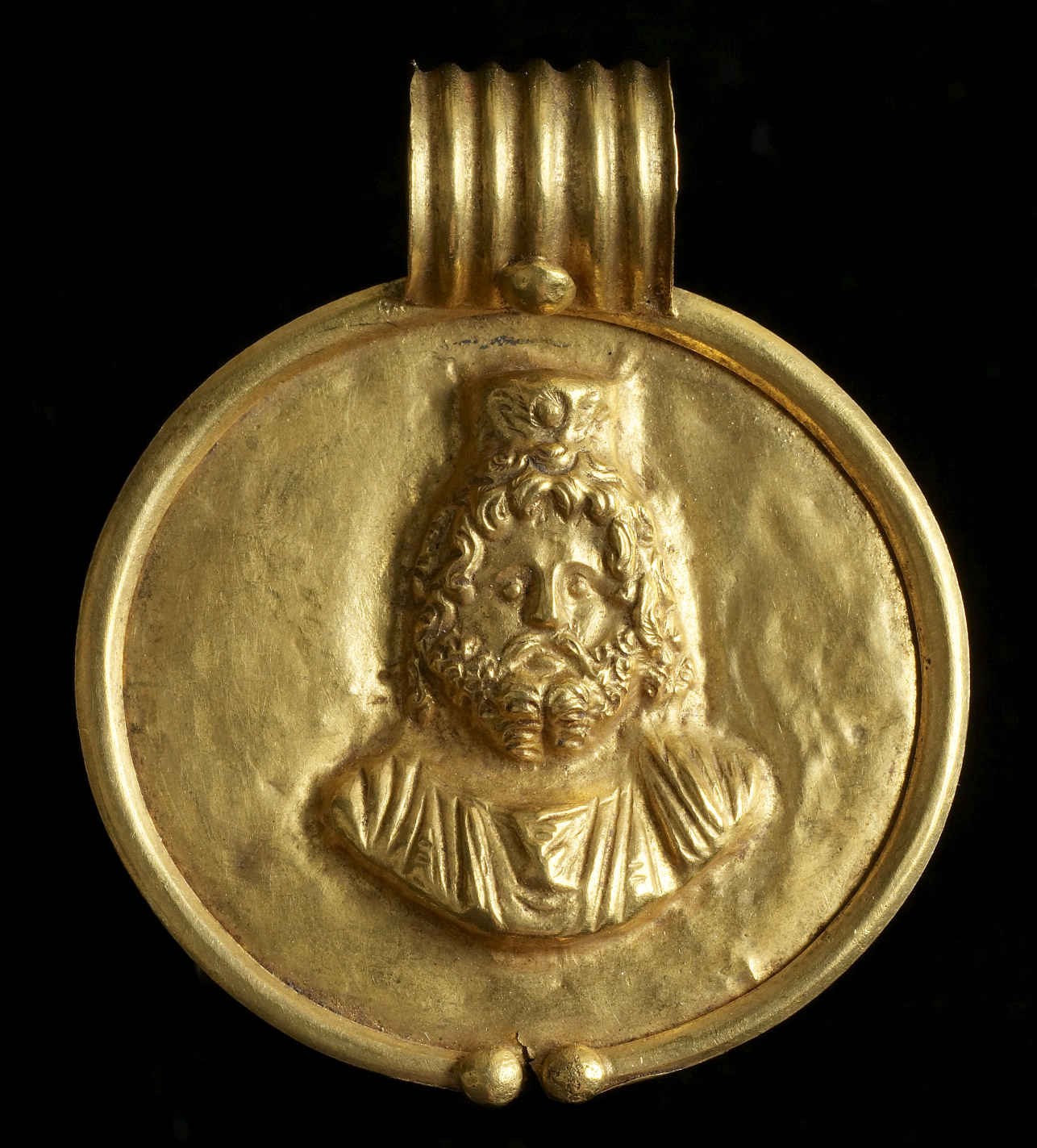
Pendant with Serapis, Egypt, 2nd century BC

In the Hellenistic period between the death of Alexander the Great in 323 BC and the Roman conquest of Greece (146 BC), Greek religion developed in various ways, including expanding over at least some of Alexander's conquests. The new dynasties of diadochi, kings and tyrants often spent lavishly on temples, often following Alexander in trying to insinuate themselves into religious cult; this was much easier for the Ptolemaic dynasty of Egypt, where the traditional ancient Egyptian religion had long had deified monarchs. The enormous raised Pergamon Altar (now in Berlin) and the Altar of Hieron in Sicily are examples of unprecedentedly large constructions of the period.

New cults of imported deities such as Isis from Egypt, Atargatis from Syria, and Cybele from Anatolia became increasingly important, as well as several philosophical movements such as Platonism, stoicism, and Epicureanism; both tended to detract from the traditional religion, although many Greeks were able to hold beliefs from more than one of these groups. Serapis was essentially a Hellenistic creation, if not devised then spread in Egypt for political reasons by Ptolemy I Soter as a hybrid of Greek and local styles of deity. Various philosophical movements, including the Orphics and Pythagoreans, began to question the ethics of animal sacrifice, and whether the gods really appreciated it; from the surviving texts Empedocles and Theophrastus (both vegetarians) were notable critics. Hellenistic astrology developed late in the period, as another distraction from the traditional practices. Although traditional myths, festivals and beliefs all continued, these trends probably reduced the grip on the imagination of the traditional pantheon, especially among the educated, but also in the general population.

=== Roman Empire ===
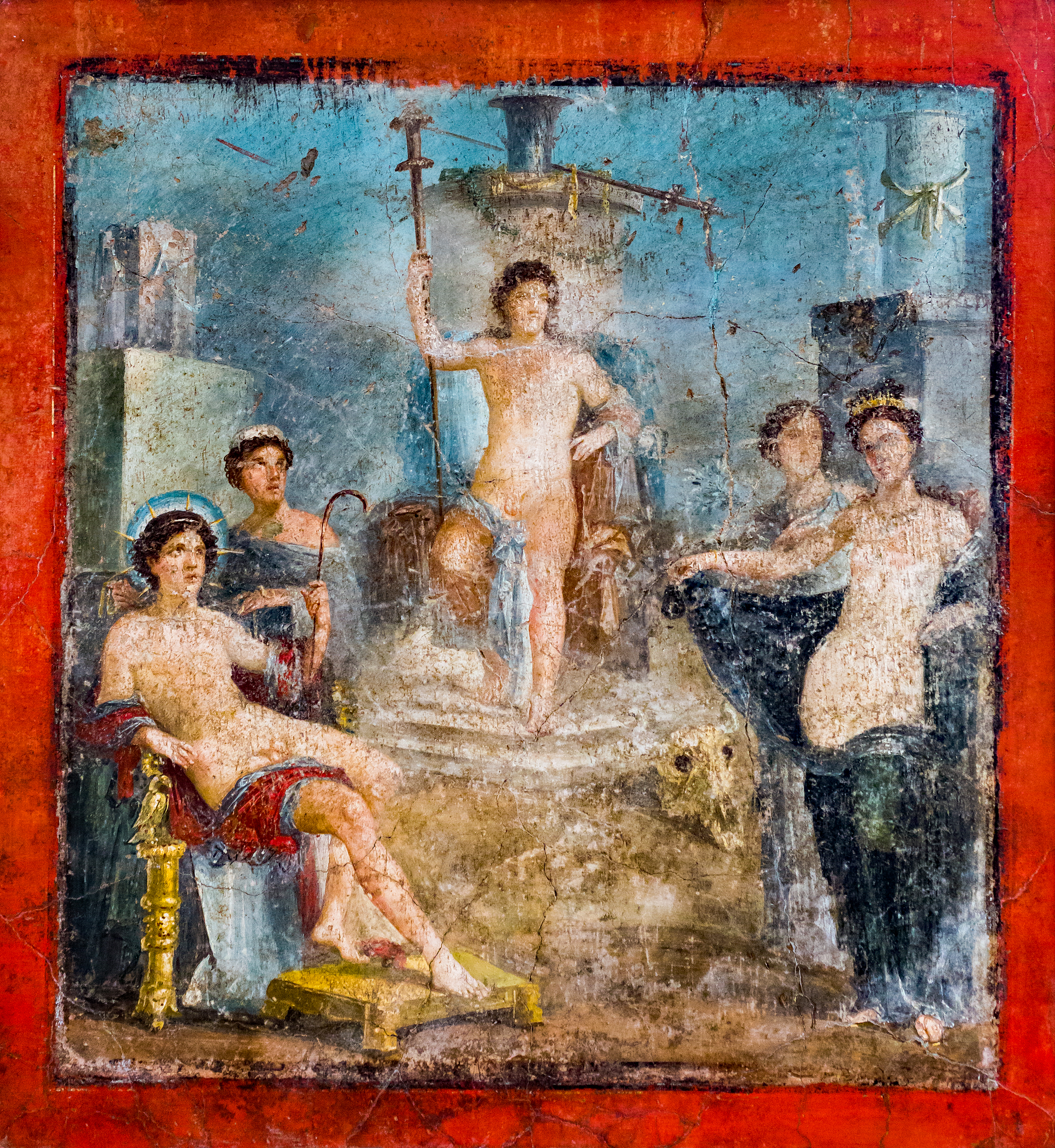
Dionysus with thyrsus sitting on a throne, with Helios, Aphrodite and other gods. Fresco from Pompeii.

When the Roman Republic conquered Greece in 146 BC, it took much of Greek religion (along with many other aspects of Greek culture such as literary and architectural styles) and incorporated it into its own. The Greek gods were equated with the ancient Roman deities; Zeus with Jupiter, Hera with Juno, Poseidon with Neptune, Aphrodite with Venus, Ares with Mars, Artemis with Diana, Athena with Minerva, Hermes with Mercury, Hephaestus with Vulcan, Hestia with Vesta, Demeter with Ceres, Hades with Pluto, Tyche with Fortuna, and Pan with Faunus. Some of the gods, such as Apollo and Bacchus, had earlier been adopted by the Romans. There were also many deities that existed in the Roman religion before its interaction with Greece that were not associated with a Greek deity, including Janus and Quirinus.

The Romans generally did not spend much on new temples in Greece other than those for their Imperial cult, which were placed in all important cities. Exceptions include Antoninus Pius (r. 138–161 AD), whose commissions include the Baalbec Temple of Bacchus, arguably the most impressive survival from the imperial period (though the Temple of Jupiter-Baal next to it was larger). It could be said the Greek world was by this time well furnished with sanctuaries. Roman governors and emperors often pilfered famous statues from sanctuaries, sometimes leaving contemporary reproductions in their place. Verres, governor of Sicily from 73 to 70 BC, was an early example who, unusually, was prosecuted after his departure.

After the huge Roman conquests beyond Greece, new cults from Egypt and Asia became popular in Greece as well as the western empire.

=== Suppression and decline ===
The initial decline of Greco-Roman polytheism was due in part to its syncretic nature, assimilating beliefs and practices from a variety of foreign religious traditions as the Roman Empire expanded. Greco-Roman philosophical schools incorporated elements of Judaism and Early Christianity, and mystery religions like Christianity and Mithraism also became increasingly popular. Constantine I became the first Roman Emperor to convert to Christianity, and the Edict of Milan in 313 AD enacted official tolerance for Christianity within the Empire. Still, in Greece and elsewhere, there is evidence that pagan and Christian communities remained essentially segregated from each other, with little mutual cultural influence. Urban pagans continued to use the civic centers and temple complexes, while Christians set up their own, new places of worship in suburban areas. Contrary to some older scholarship, newly converted Christians did not simply continue worshiping in converted temples; rather, new Christian communities formed as older pagan communities declined and were eventually suppressed and disbanded.

The Roman Emperor Julian, a nephew of Constantine, initiated an effort to end the ascension of Christianity within the empire and reorganize a syncretic version of Greco-Roman polytheism that he termed "Hellenism". Later known as "The Apostate", Julian had been raised Christian but embraced his ancestors' paganism in early adulthood. Taking notice of how Christianity ultimately flourished under suppression, Julian pursued a policy of marginalization but not destruction towards the Church; tolerating and at times lending state support to other prominent faiths (particularly Judaism) when he believed doing so would be likely to weaken Christianity. Julian's Christian training influenced his decision to create a single organized version of the various old pagan traditions, with a centralized priesthood and a coherent body of doctrine, ritual, and liturgy based on Neoplatonism. On the other hand, Julian forbade Christian educators from utilizing many of the great works of philosophy and literature associated with Greco-Roman paganism. He believed Christianity had benefited significantly from not only access to but influence over classical education.

Julian's successors Jovian, Valentinian I, and Valens continued Julian's policy of religious toleration within the Empire, garnering them both praise from pagan writers. Official persecution of paganism in the Eastern Empire began under Theodosius I in 381. Theodosius strictly enforced anti-pagan laws, had priesthoods disbanded, temples destroyed, and actively participated in Christian actions against pagan holy sites. He enacted laws that prohibited worship of pagan gods not only in public, but also within private homes. The last Olympic Games were held in 393 , and Theodosius likely suppressed any further attempts to hold the games. The Western Emperor Gratian, under the influence of his adviser Ambrose, ended the widespread, unofficial tolerance that had existed in the Western Roman Empire since the reign of Julian. In 382, Gratian appropriated the income and property of the remaining orders of pagan priests, disbanded the Vestal Virgins, removed altars, and confiscated temples.

Despite official suppression by the Roman government, worship of the Greco-Roman gods persisted in some rural and remote regions into the early Middle Ages. A claimed temple to Apollo, with a community of worshipers and associated sacred grove, survived at Monte Cassino until 529, when it was forcefully converted to a Christian chapel by Saint Benedict of Nursia, who destroyed the altar and cut down the grove. Other pagan communities, namely the Maniots, persisted in the Mani Peninsula of Greece until at least the 9th century.

=== Pagan Continuation ===
During Late Antiquity, the decline of traditional practices was marked by a significant shift in nomenclature. In the Greek-speaking East, Christians increasingly referred to polytheistic practitioners as Hellenes (Ἕλληνες), causing the word to largely lose its cultural meaning and take on a derogatory religious connotation by the latter half of the 4th century. The final generation of classical philosophers, such as the Neoplatonist heads of the Athenian School, Proclus (412–485) and Damascius (458–538), were overt practitioners of Hellenic paganism and Theurgy. The intellectual survival of their doctrines was later secured by Byzantine scholars through conscious strategies of intellectual accommodation, or oikonomia, often discussed under the framework of crypto-pagan dissimulation, which allowed non-Christian material to be preserved within academic contexts. Geographically isolated regions provided refuge; the Maniots in the Mani Peninsula, for instance, were noted for being among the last Greeks to abandon the old religion, achieving full Christianization only towards the end of the 9th century, as noted by Patrick Leigh Fermor.

=== Modern revivals ===
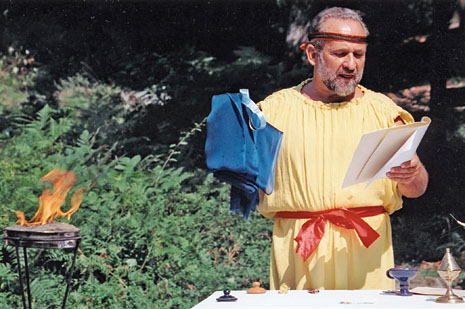
Modern Hellenic priest performing ritual.

Greek religion and philosophy have experienced a number of revivals, firstly in the arts, humanities and spirituality of Renaissance Neoplatonism, which many believed had effects in the real world. During the period (14th–17th centuries) when ancient Greek literature and philosophy gained widespread appreciation in Europe, this new popularity did not extend to ancient Greek religion, especially the original theist forms, and most new examinations of Greek philosophy were written in a solidly Christian context.

Early revivalists, with varying degrees of commitment, were the Englishmen John Fransham (1730–1810), interested in Neoplatonism, and Thomas Taylor (1758–1835), who produced the first English translations of many Neoplatonic philosophical and religious texts.

More recently, a revival has begun with contemporary Hellenism, as it is often called. In Greece, the term is Hellenic National Religion (Ελληνική Εθνική Θρησκεία). Modern Hellenism reflects Neoplatonic and Platonic speculation (represented in Porphyry, Libanius, Proclus, and Julian), as well as classical cult practice. But it has far fewer followers than Greek Orthodox Christianity. According to estimates reported by the U.S. State Department in 2006, there were perhaps as many as 2,000 followers of the ancient Greek religion out of a total Greek population of 11 million, but Hellenism's leaders place that figure at 100,000.

== See also ==
- Family tree of the Greek gods
- Hellenistic religion
- List of Ancient Greek temples
