= Enkrateia =

Virtuous self-control

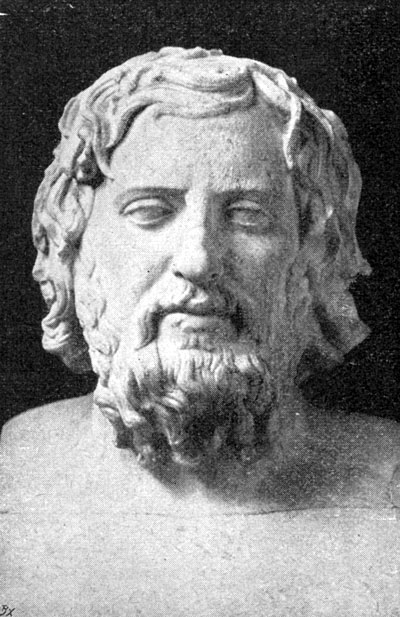
Xenophon was one of the first to write about enkrateia.

In Ancient Greek philosophy, enkrateia (Greek ἐνκράτεια, "in power - from ἐν (en, “in”) + κράτος (krátos, “power”) is a state of power over something, usually a state of self-control and self-mastery where one holds power over one's own passions and instincts. It was first used in the context of self-control by three of Socrates' students: Isocrates, Xenophon and Plato.

== Xenophon ==
For Xenophon especially, enkrateia is not just a particular virtue but "the foundation of all virtues". However, Xenophon considered virtue to have three main parts and two lesser-ranked parts, namely: enkrateia, sophrosune and epimeleia, while to a lesser extent courage and wisdom (sophia). If one exercised epimeleia and sophrosune, then one would be rewarded with the realization of eudaimonia, the Greek term for the "highest good" one can achieve in life. Rather than Socrates, who saw the practicing of enkrateia to benefit one after death, Xenophon thought that the human not practicing enkrateia was nothing more than a beast following bait.

== Aristotle ==
For Aristotle, enkrateia is the opposite of akrasia (ἀκρασία from ἀ = without + κράτος = power, control), which is a lack-of control over one's own desires. Another definition is the exercising of moral restraint, albeit fueled by personal opinion. However, the soul of both the akratic and enkratic characters are "praiseworthy," leading to the ethical fault lying in the non-rational parts of both characters. This misalignment of the soul then shows itself in many different ways, not just regarding the exercise of temperance.

A person in this state of enkrateia would perform what they know to be a positive choice because of its positive consequences, while a person in a state of akrasia would perform what they know not to be a positive choice, in spite of its negative consequences, because of the immediate pleasures the choice provides.

Aristotle also put enktreia and its antithesis, akrasia, within sophrosyne, the "sphere" of bodily pleasure and the control of these physical desires for pleasure. He also makes the comparison with karteria, the endurance of physical pain, as a possible analogue which stems from the same goal of controlling human urges and passions.

== Plato ==
In his earlier dialogues, the term enkrateia is never explicitly used. This may have arisen from Plato's disagreement in terms of the definition of the term, as enkrateia was the facilitator of a pursuit of the good and did not create a dynamic for the evaluation of the good or bad, nor knowledge itself. Plato also denied the reality of akrasia and therefore enkrateia because both are interconnected with each other and the logical outcomes of the pursuit of knowledge. Thus, it provided a pathway for the pursuit of the good without the need for other elements.

The Platonic theory of the soul's constitution, namely: logistikon, thymoeides, and epithymetikon, according to contemporary research, facilitated a reconceptualization of enkretia away from its less beneficial nature to something that is more central to the very constitution of the human soul itself. Thus, the possibility of enkrateia and akrasia lies within the elements of the soul from the very beginning.

== Biblical usage ==
In the New Testament of the Christian Bible, the term for self-control and temperance is enkrateia. In many of the verses, the term exclusively implies the careful restriction of indulgence into material and physical desires with an emphasis on dwelling upon and doing virtuous actions and thoughts. In the Epistle to the Galatians (specifically 5:23), the Greek term nephalios is also employed, although the term is more attributed to the recusal from alcoholic beverages and maintenance of a sober lifestyle.

An early Christian sect known as the Encratites, first recorded by the Greek Bishop Irenaeus, created their religious philosophy around the exercising of self-restraint from physical pleasure but also marriage, procreation, drinking, and meat consumption. However, the general definition of Encratism practiced by the Encratites was a rejection of marriage, procreation, and meat consumption.

In the theological teachings of 4th century Bishop Gregory of Nyssa, enkrateia was the pathway towards restoring divine Monism, with the feminine being the result of original sin. Physical sexuality and godly love are considered two distinct acts and not synonymous, with the realization of divine oneness leading to an asexual status, considered by Gregory as an embodiment of all-maleness.

== See also ==
- Akrasia (weakness or lack of self-control)
- Teetotalism (abstaining from alcohol)
- Sophrosyne (soundness of mind)
- Seven virtues
- Seven deadly sins
- Porneia (fornication)
- Epimeleia heautou (care for self)
- Hagneia
