= Ceremonies of ancient Greece =

Religious practices in ancient Greece

Ceremonies of ancient Greece encompassed practices of a formal religious nature celebrating particular moments in the life of the community or individual in Greece from the period of the Greek Dark Ages (c. 1000 B.C) to the middle ages (c. 500 A.D). Ancient Greek religion was not standardised and had no formalised canon of religious texts, nor single priestly hierarchy, and practices varied greatly. However, ceremonial life in pre-Christian Greece generally involved offerings of a variety of forms towards gods and heroes, as well as a plethora of public celebrations such as weddings, burial rites, and festivals.

== Offerings ==
=== Libation ===
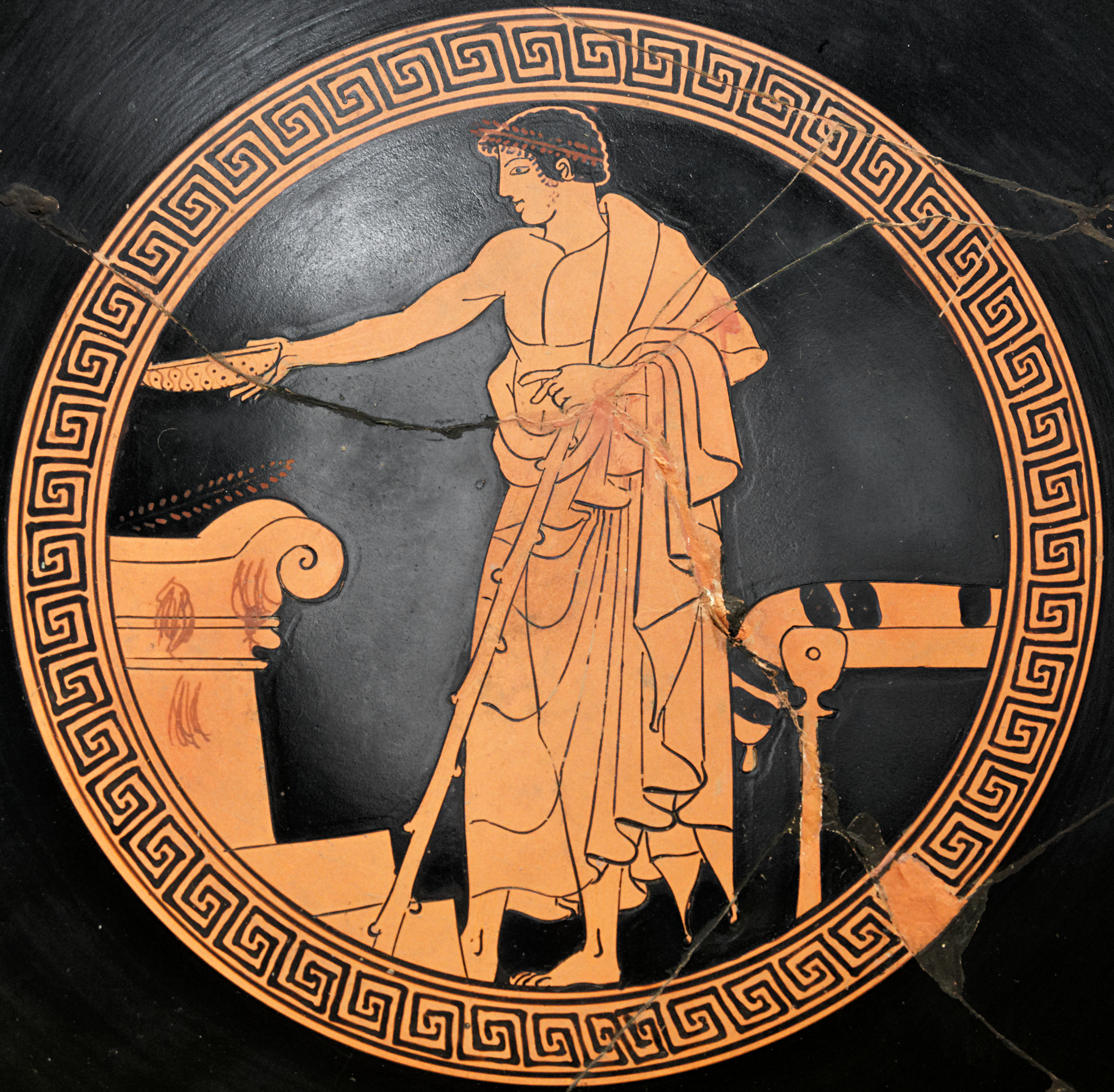
A man pours out a libation as depicted on an Attic terracotta cup

A libation is an offering involving the ritual pouring out of a liquid. In ancient Greece, such libations most commonly consisted of watered down wine, but also sometimes of pure wine, honey, olive oil, water or milk. It was a basic aspect of religion in ancient Greece, and possibly the most common religious practice. It was common to perform libations at the beginning and end of every day, and also at the beginning of meals, and was customarily paired with prayer to the gods, which was performed while standing upright and sometimes with their arms raised up.

Libation commonly involved the pouring of wine from a handheld vessel. It was common to pour the substance from a wine jug into a bowl known as a phiale. Then, a part of the substance was poured from the phiale as an offering and the remainder is consumed. This ritual was repeated whenever wine was served. It was typical for libations from each bowl to be dedicated for a specific purpose. During a symposium, it was customary to serve three successive bowls of wine, where libations from the first bowl were usually dedicated either to the Olympians or to Agathos Daimon, libations from the second were usually dedicated to the heroes of Greek myth and libations from the third bowl were dedicated either to Zeus Teleios or to Hermes. Individuals could also make additional dedications to gods of their own choosing.

It was also common to perform libation as a part of animal sacrifices, where wine was poured onto the animal during the leadup to its sacrifice. Also, once the animal had been killed and burned, wine was poured onto the fire.

Libations were also poured into the dirt, as a ritual to honour both the humans and gods who reside in the underworld. The Odyssey explains one such offering, where a hole is dug by Odysseus in the earth, and water, honey and wine are spilled around it. Such libations could also be performed by tipping over a large vessel containing the substance to be offered. Libations would include blood in order to honour heroes who participated in war, while offerings at tombs would more commonly have involved milk or honey.

=== Animal sacrifice ===
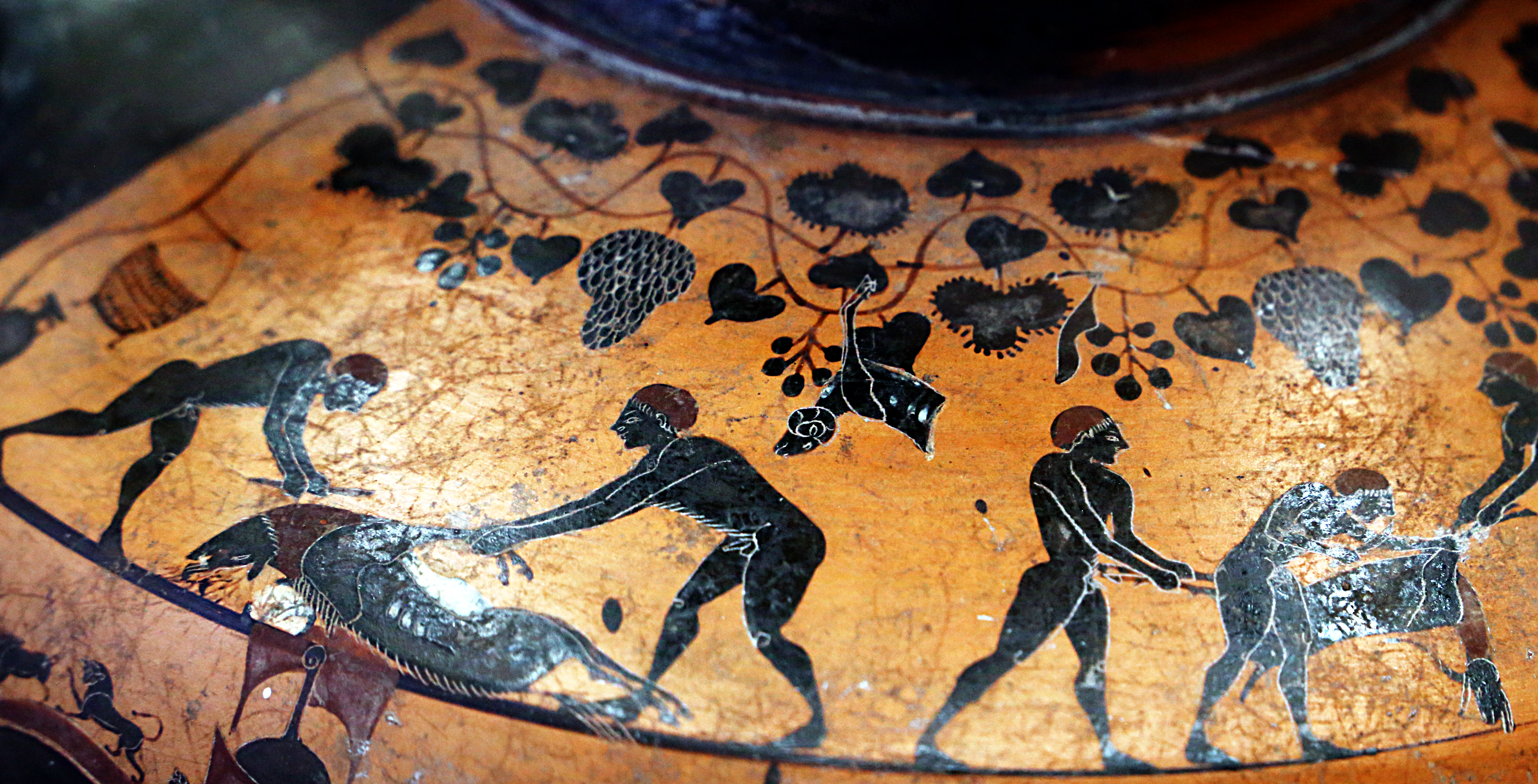
A scene depicting men sacrificing a pig on Ricci Hydria

A key aspect of ceremonial life involved the sacrificing of domestic animals. This was performed at an altar usually located outside of temples. Animal sacrifices were also accompanied by singing and prayer. The animal was chosen and should be of good stock and in good health, and bulls were preferred over other animals, though sacrifices could involve cows, sheep, goats, pigs, and birds, however, sheep were the most common animal that was sacrificed.

The animal was adorned with garlands and led by a girl towards the altar. This girl concealed the sacrificial knife in a basket that she held over her head. Libations would also be poured over the animal. Various hymns were sung and prayers said as the animal was killed, and once the animal is slain, women were supposed to cry out loudly. The animal was butchered and its components were used for different purposes. The hide was usually bequeathed to the temple to sell, while the blood was poured over the altar. The meat is prepared to be consumed by the celebrants while all the remaining inedible parts are gathered together and burned as an offering to the gods. Libations might also be poured on the fire at this time. When honoring the gods of the underworld, however, animal sacrifices were quite different, and the whole of the animal was burned as in a holocaust.

Animal sacrifices were practiced at feasts in relation to the slaughtering of animals and the consumption of their meat. However, animal sacrifices were also used in order to win the favor of the gods, and so they were used in times of disaster or before setting out upon some important mission, such as a military conflict.

=== Pharmakos ===
Pharmakos refers to the ritualistic sacrifice of a human scapegoat. This practice was used especially during times of disaster in order to appease the gods and to purify the community. However, it was also practiced on a regular basis, such as on the first day of the Thargelia in Athens.

Hipponax of Kolophon describes this process, where the two ugliest men that can be found were chosen to be sacrificed. Then, at the start of the Thargelia, the men were paraded around wearing fig-necklaces and beaten in the most painful place possible using sticks from fig-trees. They were led to the seashore, where they were to be sacrificed, and killed by being stoned to death, then the corpses were burned and the ashes either cast into the sea or scattered onto the fields. Yet, there has been some contention about how reliable Hipponax's account was, especially given the time between when the ritual was performed and when Hipponax wrote.

Over time, this sacrificial ritual changed to a less severe form of atonement for a criminal act. So, at sites like Lefkada, criminals would sometimes be taken to be cast down from a cliffside, but he would be watched and caught underneath by men in boats, and his descent would be slowed by attaching birds or feathers to him. This reflected a distinctly non-lethal form of the scapegoat ritual which some scholars have used to support the idea that the pharmakos ceremony was never practiced as an execution, and even in its earlier form, only involved stoning and severe beatings, but never to the point of death.

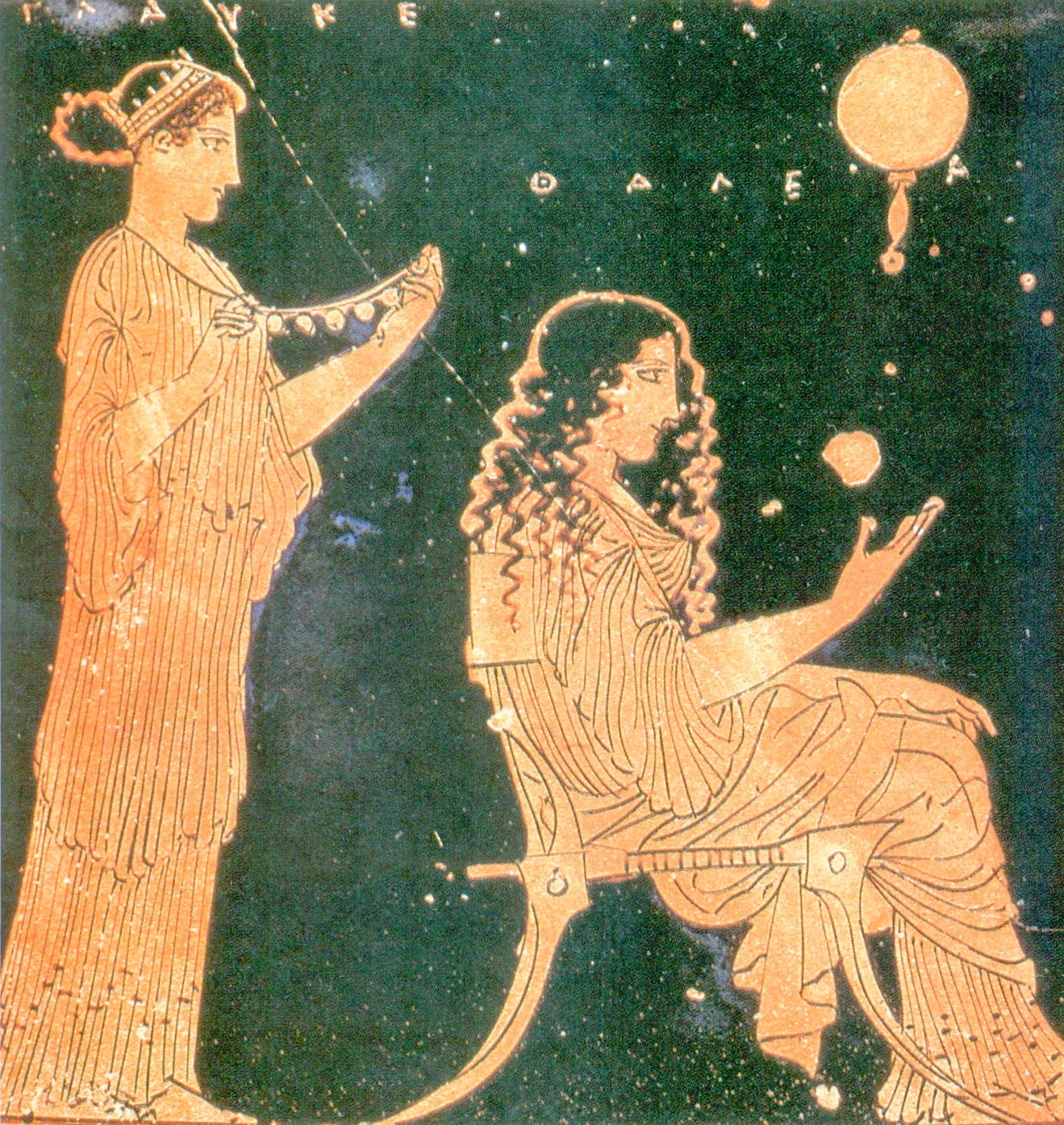
Painting on ancient Greek ceramic depicting a bride preparing for her wedding.

== Weddings ==
There were smaller rituals that would be performed before the wedding itself, such as a bath of purification, offerings and sacrifices made at the temple and a prenuptial feast. Among the different city-states of Ancient Greece, it was most common to perform the wedding ceremony after dusk. And at that time, the bride would be escorted by her family on the back of a chariot as it moved slowly toward the groom's house. This process of the bride leaving her father's house and joining her husband's was signified by the removal of the bride's veil. Another important ritual in the wedding ceremony was the offering up of an apple by the groom's family to be consumed by the bride. The wedding ceremony was formalised by the bride moving into her husband's house as well as by the bride's father giving a dowry to the groom.

Marriage ceremonies in Sparta differed greatly from the rest of the Greek city-states. Unlike in the rest of Greece, Spartan women had to consent for the marriage to be valid and not just her parents. The ceremony itself was also quite simple and short and would involve the bride and the groom engaging in hand-to-hand combat until the groom is able to overpower his bride and carry her back to his home. After the ceremony was complete, like in the other city-states, the families of the couple would celebrate over a feast.

== Funeral rites ==
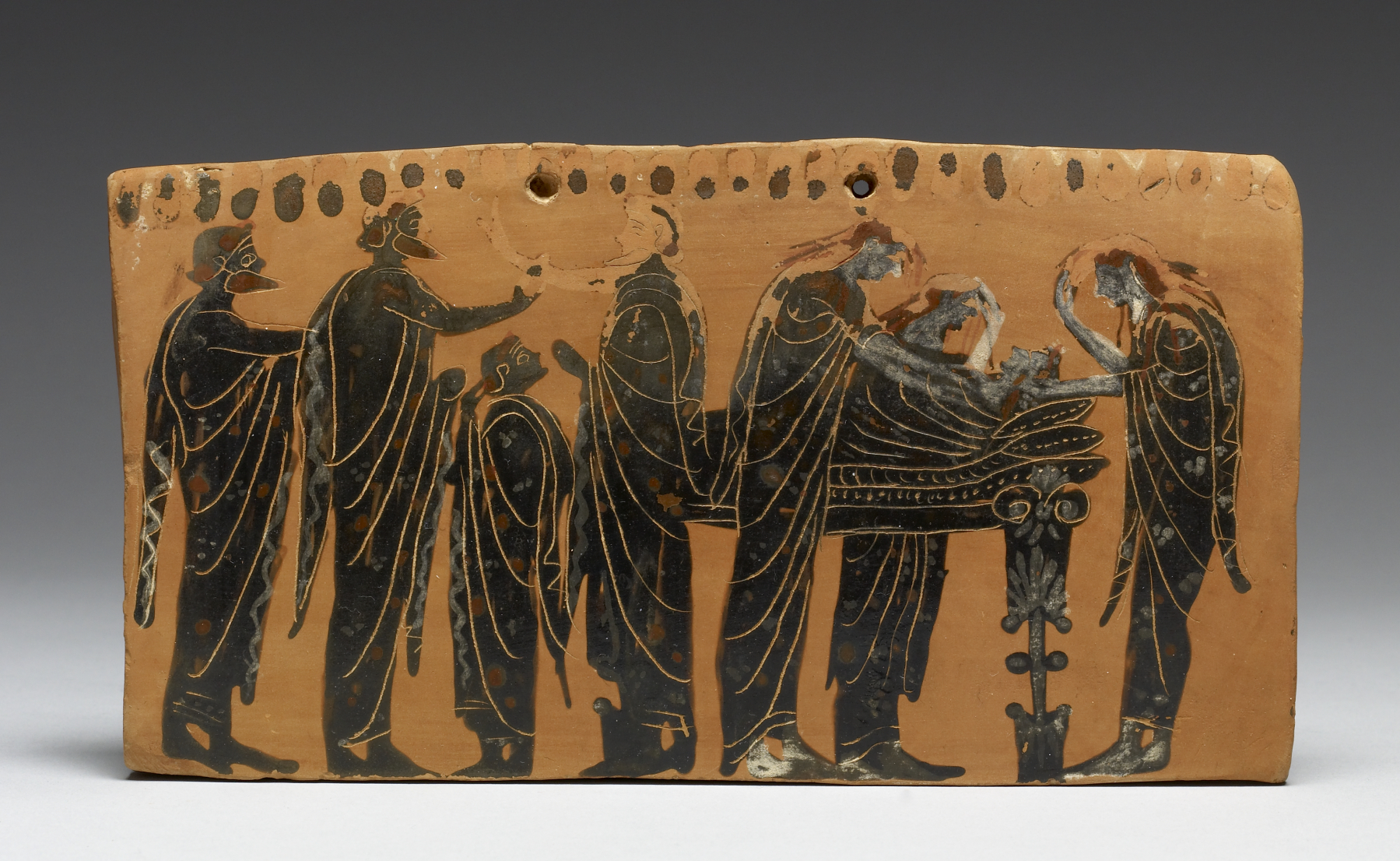
A terracotta plaque depicting the dead body being displayed, surrounded by family with women tearing out their hair in mourning.

Prior to a person’s death, they would make arrangements for the care of their families and property, to say their final farewells and to pray. After the person had died, the body was washed and anointed with oil and often a wreath would be put around the deceased person’s neck. Then, coins would be put on the person’s eyes, it was believed that this would allow the individual to pay Charon, the ferryman of the dead, to transport them across the river Styx into the afterlife. In some cases, an amulet would be put on the mouth instead, while in some mystery cults, they would use a golden ornament, sometimes known as a ‘passport of the dead,’ which carried important information for helping the deceased to find their way around in the underworld.

The following day, the body was laid out for display. At this time, close female relatives of the deceased would lead the mourning by wailing loudly, hitting themselves and ripping their clothes and hair. Early the following day, usually before sunrise, the body would be led in a procession to where it would be laid to rest. And at this point, mourners would cut off a piece of their hair and offer it alongside libations to the deceased. Sometimes blood offerings were made also. Prayers were an important part of the burial process following the offerings. After the burial itself, the deceased person’s property would be cleansed with spiced saltwater, usually by their closest kinswomen and a feast would take place to honor all of the participants of the burial. And even after a person had been buried, it was important to continue to offer libations and cuttings of hair, as well as to regularly celebrate both recently deceased ancestors and the whole host of the dead at major ceremonies like the Genesia.

However, funeral rites did vary both throughout the history of Ancient Greece as well as between the different city-states. For example, cremation was a common practice within the city-state of Athens.

Plutarch wrote that among the Argives, when someone lost a relative or close companion, it was customary to sacrifice to Apollo at the end of the mourning period and to Hermes thirty days later. He explained that they believed the earth received the bodies of the dead, while Hermes received their souls. During the sacrifice to Apollo, the mourners gave barley to Apollo's temple servant, took the meat of the sacrificial animal, extinguished the household fire because it had been polluted by death, kindled a new fire, and cooked the meat over it. This meal was called the ἔγκνισμα (engknisma).

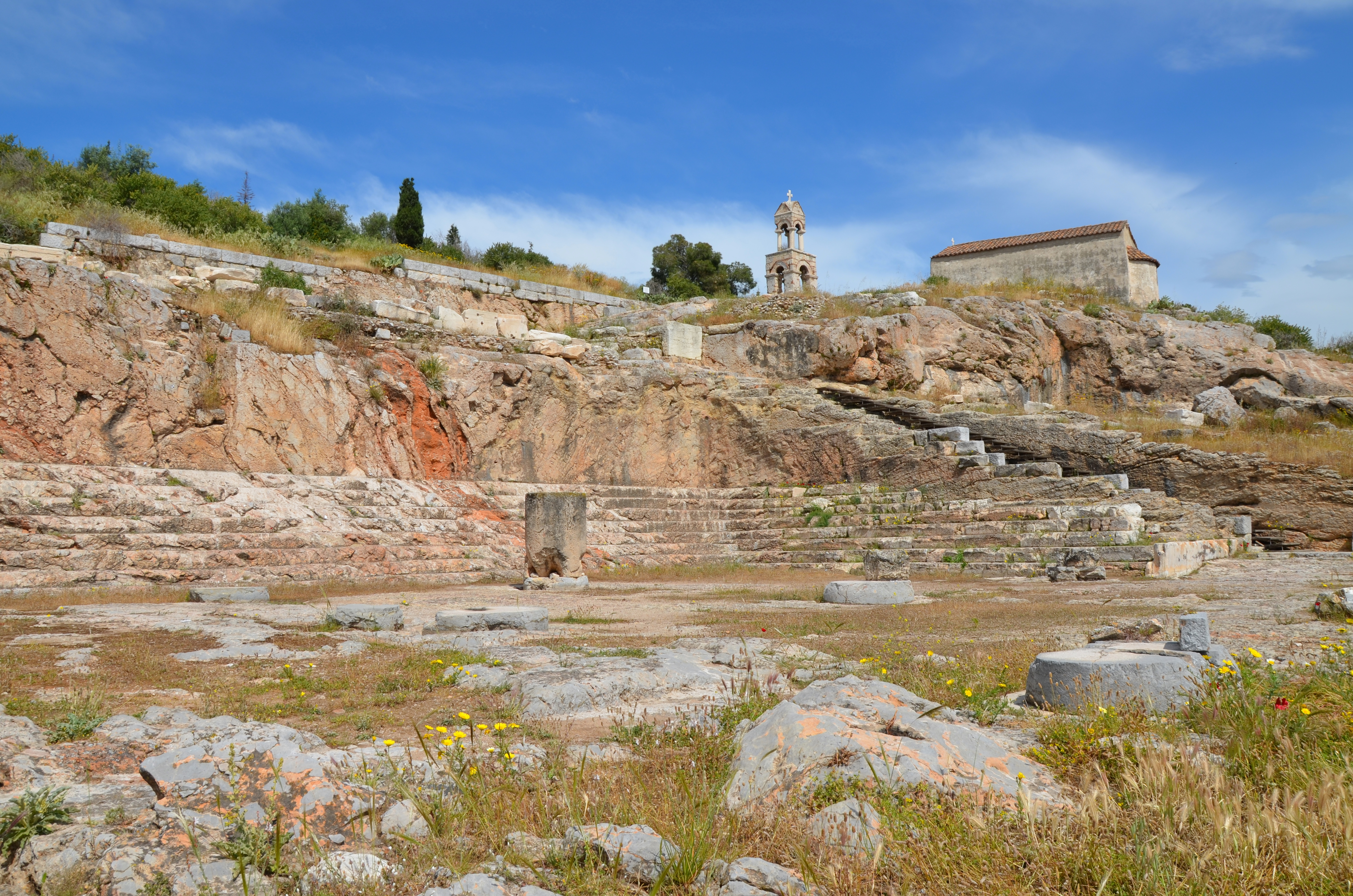
A picture of the Telesterion and the Sanctuary of Demeter and Kora at Eleusis in modern day Greece

== Mystery cults ==
Mystery cults were a special aspect of religion in Ancient Greece, so named for the great level of secrecy associated with them. Unlike the rest of religious life in Ancient Greece, the rituals, practices and knowledge of mystery cults were only supposed to be available to their initiates, so relatively little is known about the mystery cults of Ancient Greece. Some of the major schools included the Eleusinian Mysteries, the Dionysian Mysteries and the Orphic mysteries.

=== Eleusinian Mysteries ===
Twice each year, initiates of the Eleusinian mysteries travelled to Eleusis from Athens along the sacred way, once in the spring for the Lesser Mysteries and then again around September for the Greater Mysteries. During the journey, celebrants would re-enact Demeter's search for her daughter Kore. Then the initiates stopped by a well, just as Demeter had, where they fasted and consumed a beverage made from mint and barley, which may have contained hallucinogenic properties. After they had consumed the drink, the initiates would enter the underground theater, known as the Telesterion, where the Mysteries actually took place. This stage may have consisted of a ritual re-enactment of the story of Demeter and Kore, and Kore's death and transformation into the figure of Persephone, with which the whole of the Eleusinian Mysteries is concerned. Many accounts and references to the Eleusinian mysteries describe them as having a profoundly powerful effect on the participants, and that many emerged from them without a fear of death.

=== Dionysian Mysteries ===
Less is known about the Dionysian Mysteries than the Eleusinian Mysteries, but it seems to share the same theme of seasonal death and rebirth. Many of the ceremonies within the Dionysian mystery involve the idea of losing control of one's body, of returning to a more primal world and abandoning civilized society. Wine seems to have played a vital role to the Dionysian mysteries, but so did dancing and music, including the use of drums and bullroarers. A key aspect of the mysteries was the idea that by losing control of yourself in this way, the divine would come to inhabit your body.
