= Methodius of Olympus =

Christian bishop and martyr (died c. 311)

Saint Methodius of Olympus
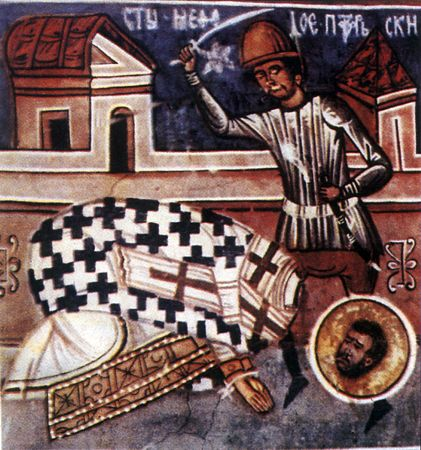
- 17th-century depiction of Methodius's martyrdom

Bishop of Olympus Church Father
- Born: unknown
- Died: c. 311 AD; Chalcis in Greece
- Venerated in: Catholic Church; Eastern Orthodox Church; Oriental Orthodox Church
- Feast: June 20
- Theology career
- Notable work: On the Resurrection; On Freewill; Symposium
- Theological work
- Era: Patristic Age
- Language: Greek
- Tradition or movement: Trinitarianism
- Main interests: Apologetics, Freewill, Eschatology
- Notable ideas: Renewal of Creation; Excellence of Virginity

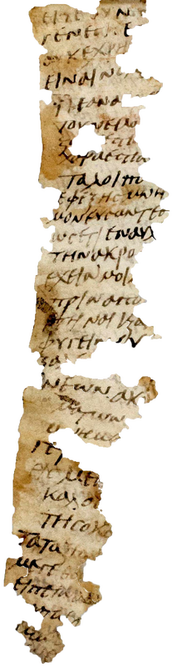
Papyrus fragment of the Symposium, oratio 8, dated 5th or 6th century, the earliest known manuscript of a work by Methodius (Montserrat Abbey library, P.Monts. Roca 4.57)

Methodius of Olympus (Koine Greek: Μεθόδιος) (died c. 311) was an early Christian bishop, ecclesiastical author, and martyr. Today, he is honored as a saint and Church Father; the Catholic Church commemorates his feast on June 20.

== Life ==
Few reports have survived on the life of this first systematic opponent of Origen; even these short accounts present many difficulties. Eusebius does not mention him in his Church History, probably because he opposed various theories of Origen, thus Jerome provides the earliest accounts of him. According to him, Methodius suffered martyrdom at Chalcis at the end of the newest persecution, i.e., under Diocletian, Galerius or Maximinus Daia. Although he then adds, "that some assert", that this may have happened under Decius and Valerian a, this statement (ut alii affirmant), adduced even by him as uncertain, is unlikely, given that Methodius also wrote against the Neoplatonic philosopher Porphyry (234–305).

The location of Methodius's episcopal see is a matter of controversy. His writings repeatedly betray a Lycian background and hence his see has also been located in that province. Methodius has been called bishop of the Lycian capital Patara, but this tradition first appeared in the late 6th century. Jerome spoke of Methodius as "bishop of Olympus in Lycia and afterwards Bishop of Tyre“. While episcopacy in Tyre is more than doubtful - since only Jerome mentions it, the list of bishops of Tyre does not leave room for Methodius and switching sees was unusual at that time, - Olympus is widely acknowledged as historically correct, e.g. by Theodor Zahn. Franz Diekamp rejects this verdict and argues, that Methodius was bishop of Philippi in Macedonia, because several manuscript mention him as bishop of that city, John of Antioch in 435 numbered Methodius among the bishops of Greece and Illyria and because it is dubious whether Olympus had a bishop in 311 at all. Furthermore, Jerome locating the martyrdom of Methodius in Chalkis in Greece arguably would fit a bishop from Macedonia, but not from Lycia (though both provinces were then ruled by the same emperor, Galerius.

== Works ==
Methodius had a comprehensive philosophical education, and was an important theologian as well as a prolific and polished author. Chronologically, his works can only be assigned in a general way to the end of the third and the beginning of the 4th century. He became of special importance in the history of theological literature, in that he combated various views of Origen's. He particularly attacked Origen's doctrine that man's body at the resurrection is not the same body as he had in life, as well as his idea of the world's eternity.

Like Origen, Methodius is strongly influenced by Plato's philosophy, and uses to a great extent the allegorical explanation of Scripture. Of his numerous works only one has come down to us complete in a Greek text: the dialogue on virginity, under the title Symposium, or on Virginity (Symposion e peri hagneias). In the dialogue, composed with reference to Plato's Symposium, he depicts a festive meal of ten virgins in the garden of Arete, at which each of the participators extols Christian virginity and its sublime excellence. It concludes with a hymn on Jesus as the Bridegroom of the Church. Larger fragments are preserved of several other writings in Greek; old versions of other works survive in Slavonic, though some are abbreviated.

The following works are in the form of dialogue:

1. On Free Will (peri tou autexousiou), an important treatise attacking the Gnostic view of the origin of evil and in proof of the freedom of the human will
2. On the Resurrection (Aglaophon e peri tes anastaseos), in which the doctrine that the same body that man has in life will be awakened to incorruptibility at the resurrection is specially put forward in opposition to Origen.

While large portions of the original Greek text of both these writings are preserved, only Slavonic versions of the four following shorter treatises survive:

1. De vita, on life and rational action, which exhorts in particular to contentedness in this life and to the hope of the life to come
2. De cibis, on the Jewish dietary laws, and on the young cow, which is mentioned in Leviticus, with allegorical explanation of the Old Testament food-legislation and the red cow (Num., xix)
3. De lepra, on leprosy, to Sistelius, a dialogue between Eubulius (Methodius) and Sistelius on the mystic sense of the Old Testament references to lepers (Lev., xiii)
4. De sanguisuga, on the leech in Proverbs (Prov., xxx, 15 sq.) and on the text, "the heavens show forth the glory of God" (Ps. xviii, 2).

Of other writings, no longer extant, Jerome mentions (loc. cit.) a voluminous work against Porphyry, the Neoplatonist who had published a book against Christianity; a treatise on the Pythonissa directed against Origen, commentaries on Genesis and the Canticle of Canticles. Other authors attributed a work On the Martyrs, and a dialogue Xenon to Methodius; in the latter he opposes the doctrine of Origen on the eternity of the world. Gregory Abu'l Faraj attribute to Methodius some kind of work dealing with the patriarchs.

The 7th-century Apocalypse of Pseudo-Methodius is falsely attributed to him, as is the "Oration on Simeon and Anna".

Among the editions of his works are: P.G., XVIII; Jahn, S. Methodii opera et S. Methodius platonizans (Halle, 1865); Bonwetsch, Methodius von Olympus: I, Schriften (Leipzig, 1891).

The Byzantine encyclopedia Suda write about his work:

He assembled volumes of splendid and well-composed discourse against Porphyry; also a Symposium of twelve virgins, and an excellent discourse On the Resurrection against Origen, and another against the same On the Pythonissa, and On Freewill. He also wrote commentaries on Genesis and on the Song of Songs, and many other things which are frequently read.

Methodius has been called a percursor to the some aspects of the mysticism of Master Eckhart and Johannes Tauler.

== Doctrines ==
=== Virginity of Jesus Christ ===
Methodius taught that Jesus Christ remained virgin His whole life as an example of chastity for men:

"What then did the Lord, the Truth and the Light, accomplish on coming down to the world? He preserved His flesh incorrupt in virginity with which he had adorned it. And so let us too, if we are to come to the likeness of God, endeavor to aspire to the virginity of Christ." (Symposium 1.5)

=== Purpose of Death ===
Methodius taught in On the Resurrection that it was to prevent sin from remaining forever that God caused man to become mortal:

"In order, then, that man might not be an undying or ever-living evil, as would have been the case if sin were dominant within him, as it had sprung up in an immortal body, and was provided with immortal sustenance, God for this cause pronounced him mortal, and clothed him with mortality. For this is what was meant by the coats of skins, in order that, by the dissolution of the body, sin might be altogether destroyed from the very roots, that there might not be left even the smallest particle of root from which new shoots of sin might again burst forth." (chapter 1 paragraph 4)

=== Renewal of Creation ===
Methodius taught in On the Resurrection that while the universe was to be subject to a universal conflagration this was for the renewal and not destruction of the universe:

"But it is not satisfactory to say that the universe will be utterly destroyed, and sea and air and sky will be no longer. For the whole world will be deluged with fire from heaven, and burnt for the purpose of purification and renewal; it will not, however, come to complete ruin and corruption. For if it were better for the world not to be than to be, why did God, in making the world, take the worse course? But God did not work in vain, or do that which was worst....The creation, then, after being restored to a better and more seemly state, remains, rejoicing and exulting over the children of God at the resurrection; for whose sake it now groans and travails, waiting itself also for our redemption from the corruption of the body, that, when we have risen and shaken off the mortality of the flesh, according to that which is written, " Shake off the dust, and arise, and sit down, O Jerusalem, " [ Isaiah 52:2 ] and have been set free from sin, it also shall be freed from corruption and be subject no longer to vanity, but to righteousness. Isaiah says, too, " For as the new heaven and the new earth which I make, remains before me, says the Lord, so shall your seed and your name be; " [ Isaiah 66:22 ] and again, " Thus says the Lord that created the heaven, it is He who prepared the earth and created it, He determined it; He created it not in vain, but formed it to be inhabited. " [ Isaiah 45:18 ] For in reality God did not establish the universe in vain, or to no purpose but destruction, as those weak-minded men say, but to exist, and be inhabited, and continue. Wherefore the earth and the heaven must exist again after the conflagration and shaking of all things." (chapter 1 paragraph 8 excerpt)

=== Virgin Mary ===
Methodius's Oration on Simeon and Anna is sometimes quoted as an example of early Christian veneration of Mary as the Ever-virgin Mother of God. Unfortunately, the work is not genuine, but belongs to the 5-6th century AD.

Hail to you forever, virgin Mother of God, our unceasing joy, for unto you do I again return. . . . Hail, you fount of the Son’s love for man. . . . Wherefore, we pray you, the most excellent among women, who boast in the confidence of your maternal honors, that you would unceasingly keep us in remembrance. O holy Mother of God, remember us, I say, who make our boast in you, and who in august hymns celebrate your memory, which will ever live, and never fade away.

But some of these claims about Marian veneration are not entirely accurate. In that same work, Methodius uses similar words referring to Zion, the city where the Ministry of Jesus was consummated:

Hail, you city of the Great King, in which the mysteries of our salvation are consummated. Hail, you heaven upon earth, Sion, the city that is for ever faithful unto the Lord. Hail, and shine Jerusalem, for your light has come, the Light Eternal, the Light for ever enduring, the Light Supreme, the Light Immaterial, the Light of one substance with God and the Father, the Light which is in the Spirit, and in which is the Father; the Light which illumines the ages; the Light which gives light to mundane and supramundane things, Christ our very God. Hail, city sacred and elect of the Lord. Joyfully keep your festal days, for they will not multiply so as to wax old and pass away. Hail, you city most happy, for glorious things are spoken of you; your priest shall be clothed with righteousness, and your saints shall shout for joy, and your poor shall be satisfied with bread. Hail! rejoice, O Jerusalem, for the Lord reigns in the midst of you.

=== Ad Orientem ===
Consistent with apostolic tradition, Methodius suggested that Christians pray facing the East ("ad orientem").

"From the height of heaven, O virgins, the sound of a voice makes itself heard, awakening the dead: toward the Bridegroom, it says, let us all go in haste, clad in our white garments, our lamps in our hands, to the East."

— ( Symp., IJ; Bonwetsch, p. 132).

== See also ==
- Hagneia
