= Gottlieb Nathaniel Bonwetsch =

German Protestant theologian (1848–1925)

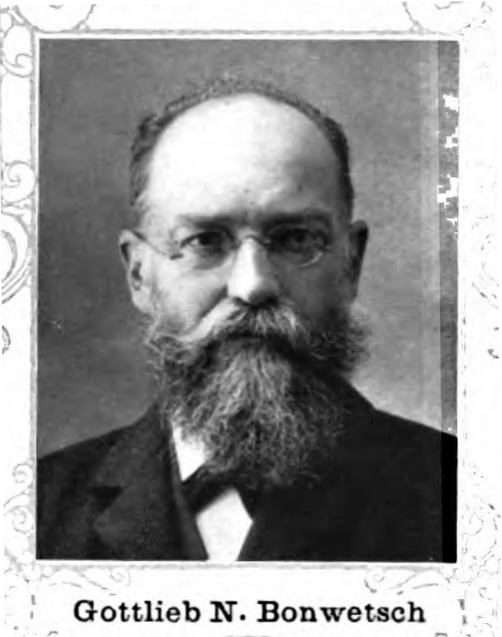
Gottlieb Nathaniel Bonwetsch

Gottlieb (Georg) Nathanael Bonwetsch (5 February 1848 – 18 July 1925) was a Russian-born German Protestant theologian.

He was born in Norka, Saratov province in Russia, where his father was pastor. He studied theology in Dorpat, then later in Göttingen and Bonn. In 1878 he published a treatise on the writings of Tertullian, titled Die Schriften Tertullians, nach der Zeit ihrer Abfassung untersucht. In 1881 obtained his doctorate in theology and his first academic position was at Dorpat (1882). He became a full professor of church history at the University of Göttingen in 1891.

His main area of work was the history of dogma involving the Early Christian Church. He also made contributions to the critical edition and commentary on the works of Methodius of Olympus and Hippolytus of Rome.
