= Hagneia =

Ancient Greek concept of ritual purity

Hagneia is an ancient Greek concept that refers to ritual purity. Along with nostos, hagneia is a leitmotif of the ancient Greek novel.

Ignatius uses the term hagneia in reference to "chastity" in Letter to Polycarp 1.2. Methodius of Olympus promotes the virtue of hagneia in his best-known work, which is modeled after and influenced by Plato's Symposium. Methodius critiques encratism.

Peter Brown notes that the idea carried significance in both pagan and Christian communities in the late third century and had an impact on Christian discourses of virginity and sexuality. The concept of hagneia was central to the interpretive framework through which Church Fathers read ascetic practices back into early Christian texts. Elizabeth Clark argues that thinkers like Jerome, John Chrysostom, and Augustine utilized figurative and allegorical interpretation to transform the historical understanding of hagneia as temporary ritual purification before a sacrifice or battle into a mandate for permanent sexual renunciation.

== See also ==
- Enkrateia
