= Altar of Hieron =

Coordinates: 37.059604°N 15.293694°E

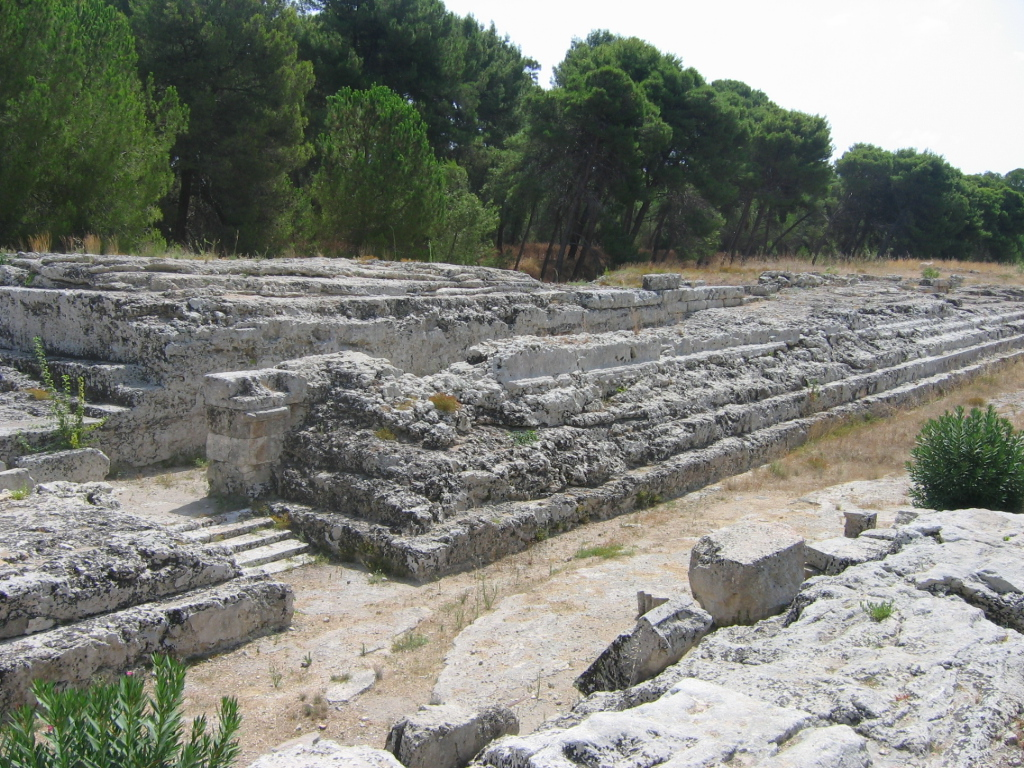
- Altar of Hieron
- Interactive map of Altar of Hieron
- Type: Sacrificial altar
- Location: Syracuse, Sicily, Italy

History
- Built: Third century BC

Site notes
- Length: 198 m (650 ft)
- Width: 22.8 m (75 ft)
- Management: Regione Siciliana
- Public access: fenced off

UNESCO World Heritage Site
- Official name: Syracuse and the Rocky Necropolis of Pantalica
- Designated: 2005
- Reference no.: 1200

The Altar of Hieron (Italian: Ara di Ierone) or the Great Altar of Syracuse is a monumental grand altar in the ancient quarter of Neapolis in Syracuse, Sicily. It was built in the Hellenistic period in Magna Graecia by King Hiero II and is the largest altar known from antiquity.

== Description ==
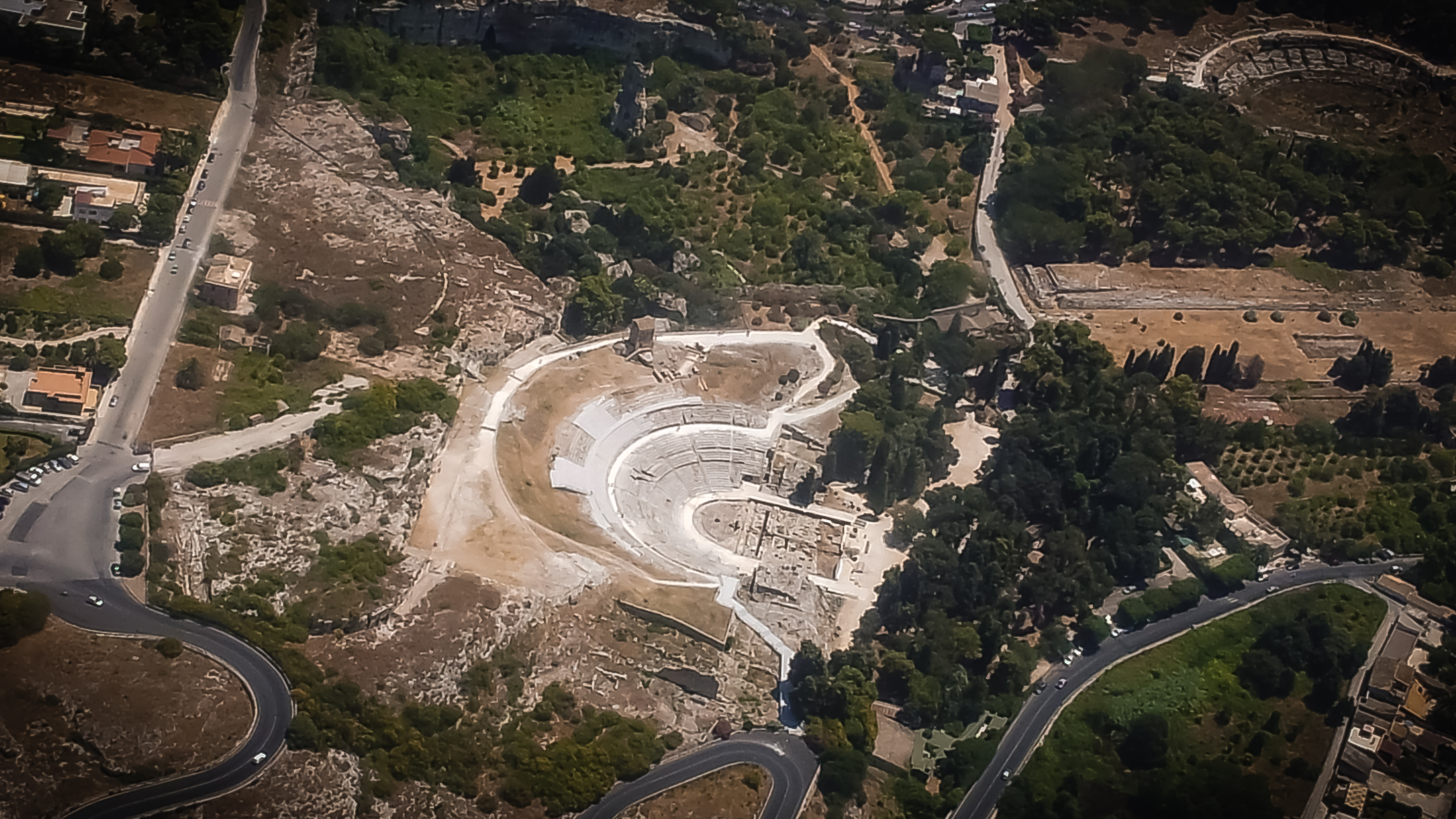
The Greek theatre (centre) and the Altar of Hieron (middle right), seen from the west.

The structure is aligned roughly north-north-west to south-east-east, and is located in the Neapolis, slightly to the southeast of the Greek theatre. Almost nothing except the foundations of the structure survive today. The structure was partly built from masonry blocks and partially carved from the living bedrock. The altar itself is 20.85 metres (68.4 ft) wide and 195.8 metres (642 ft) long (exactly one Doric stade). It sits on a crepidoma with three steps - at base this is 199.07 metres (653.1 ft) long and 22.51 metres (73.9 ft) wide. This makes it the largest altar known from the ancient world.

The upper surface of the altar was divided lengthwise into two levels of different heights: the western half was perhaps 6.06 metres (19.9 ft) high, and the eastern half was significantly taller, rising to a height of perhaps 10.68 metres (35.0 ft). There was a cornice and a Doric triglyph frieze running around the top of each level. The whole structure was covered in plaster, which was used to smooth out imperfections in the stone and for the fine decorative details. The overall structure of the altar mimics that of small fire altars which are common votive offerings in Sicily.

There were stairways on the eastern side of the altar at the northern and southern ends, which led up to the lower level of the structure. Each of the staircases had an entranceway which was supported by two telamones. The feet of one of the northern telamones are still in situ. It is unclear whether it was possible to access the higher level of the structure.

The altar was part of a larger complex. Below the structure, on the eastern side, there was a natural grotto, about 18 metres deep which contained votive offerings, some of which were deposited in the Archaic and Classical periods, long before the altar was built. To the west of the altar there was a rectangular open space with a water-proofed basin in the centre, surrounded by a u-shaped stoa. A propylon on the western side of this compound allowed access to both the open space and thus to the altar itself. In Augustan times, this open space was planted with trees in order to turn it into a sacred grove.

== Purpose ==
The altar is mentioned by Diodorus Siculus, who attributes its construction to Hiero II. Stylistic analysis of the sculptural fragments from the altar confirms this, showing that they were made at the same time as the third phase of the nearby Greek theatre, which belongs after 235 BC. The votive deposit in the natural grotto under the eastern side of the altar shows that the area was already a sacred site in the Archaic period, not long after the city of Syracuse was established.

One argument suggests that the altar was dedicated to Zeus Eleutherius (Zeus the Liberator) and was used to celebrate the Eleutheria festival, which commemorated the expulsion of the last Deinomenid tyrant, Thrasybulus of Syracuse in 466 and feature the sacrifice of 450 bulls. The size of this sacrifice would explain the scale of the altar. Caroline Lehmler questions most aspects of this reconstruction. She argues that the altar was dedicated to Olympian Zeus, on the grounds that Zeus Eleutherius was associated with the overthrow of autocrats and Hieron II was a monarch himself and is not otherwise known to have cultivated Zeus Eleutherius, but is known to have carried out several other public works honouring Olympian Zeus. Lehmler stresses, however that the two names are different epithets of the same deity, rather than distinct gods. Lehmler also questions whether sacrifices were carried out on the altar itself, since it would be difficult to get animals up the narrow stairways. She suggests that the animals were slaughtered in the courtyard area and then the parts of the animal that were allotted to the gods were carried up the stairs to be burnt on the altar.

Other suggestions, not necessarily mutually exclusive, are that the altar, as well as the nearby theatre, played a role in meetings of the League of the Sicilians which was placed under Hiero's control after the First Punic War, or that it was built for the five hundredth anniversary of Syracuse's foundation. At a more general level it served to aggrandise Hiero, as its builder, demonstrating his wealth and piety. In this, it represented the culmination of a long Sicilian Greek tradition of monumental altars - the 54.5 metre long altar of the fifth-century Temple of Olympian Zeus at Agrigento is an important precursor.

== Excavations ==
From late antiquity onwards, the altar was quarried away as raw material for other structures in Syracuse, most recently for the Spanish fortifications of Ortygia at the beginning of the fifteenth century. Amateur archaeological excavations were undertaken by Giuseppe Maria Capodieci in 1780, Saverio Landolina in 1813, and F.S. Cavallari in 1839. The only systematic and scientific excavations of the site were undertaken by Robert Koldewey and Otto Puchstein in 1893. All subsequent study of the altar has been based on their findings.

== Gallery ==
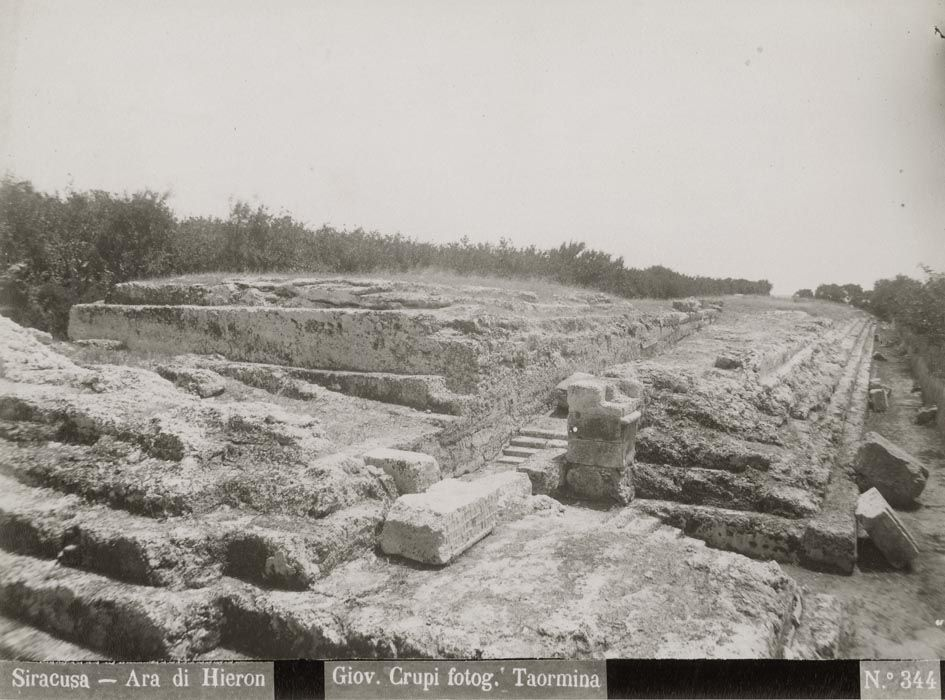
The altar at the beginning of the 20th century

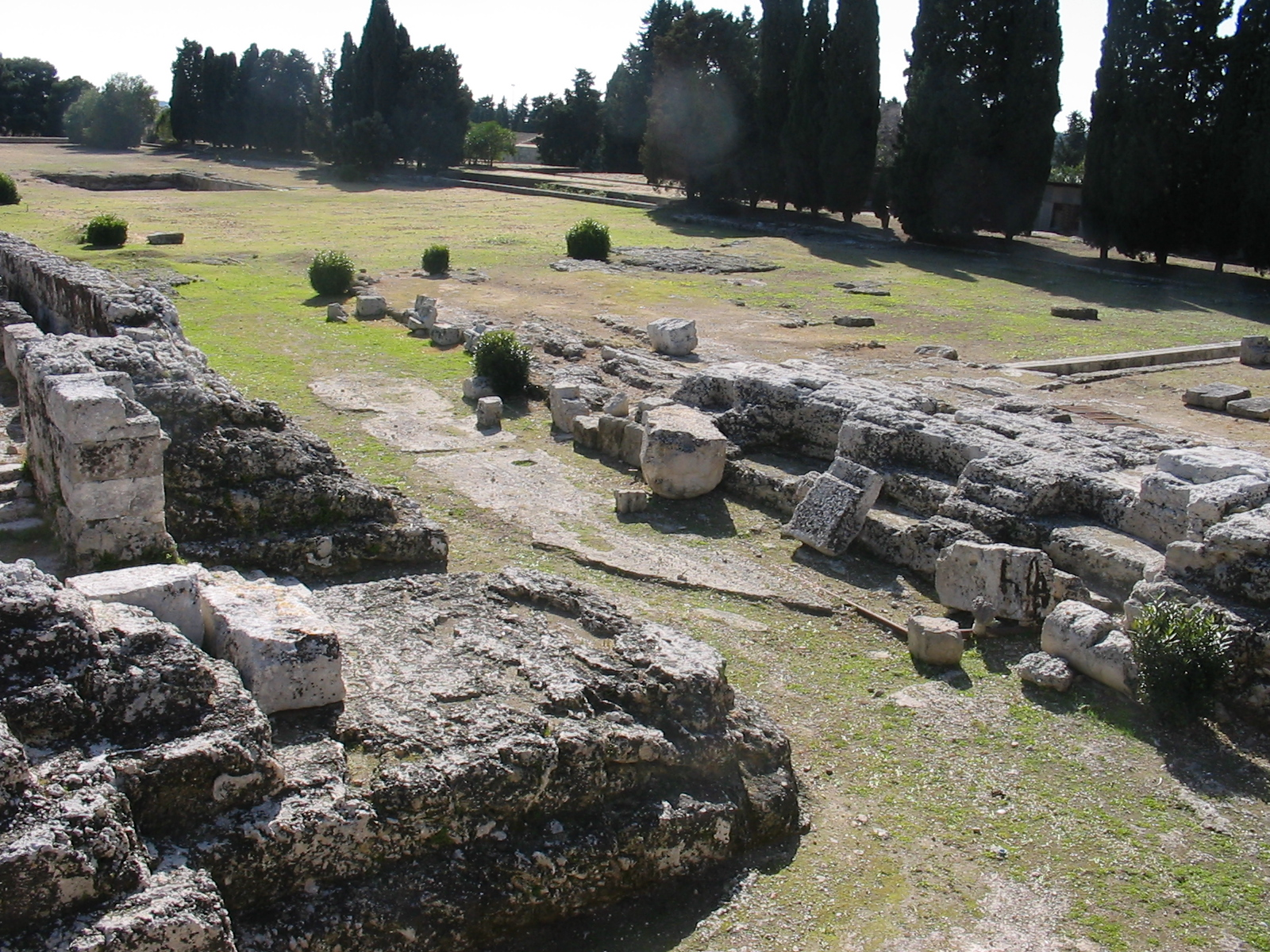
Detail of the altar

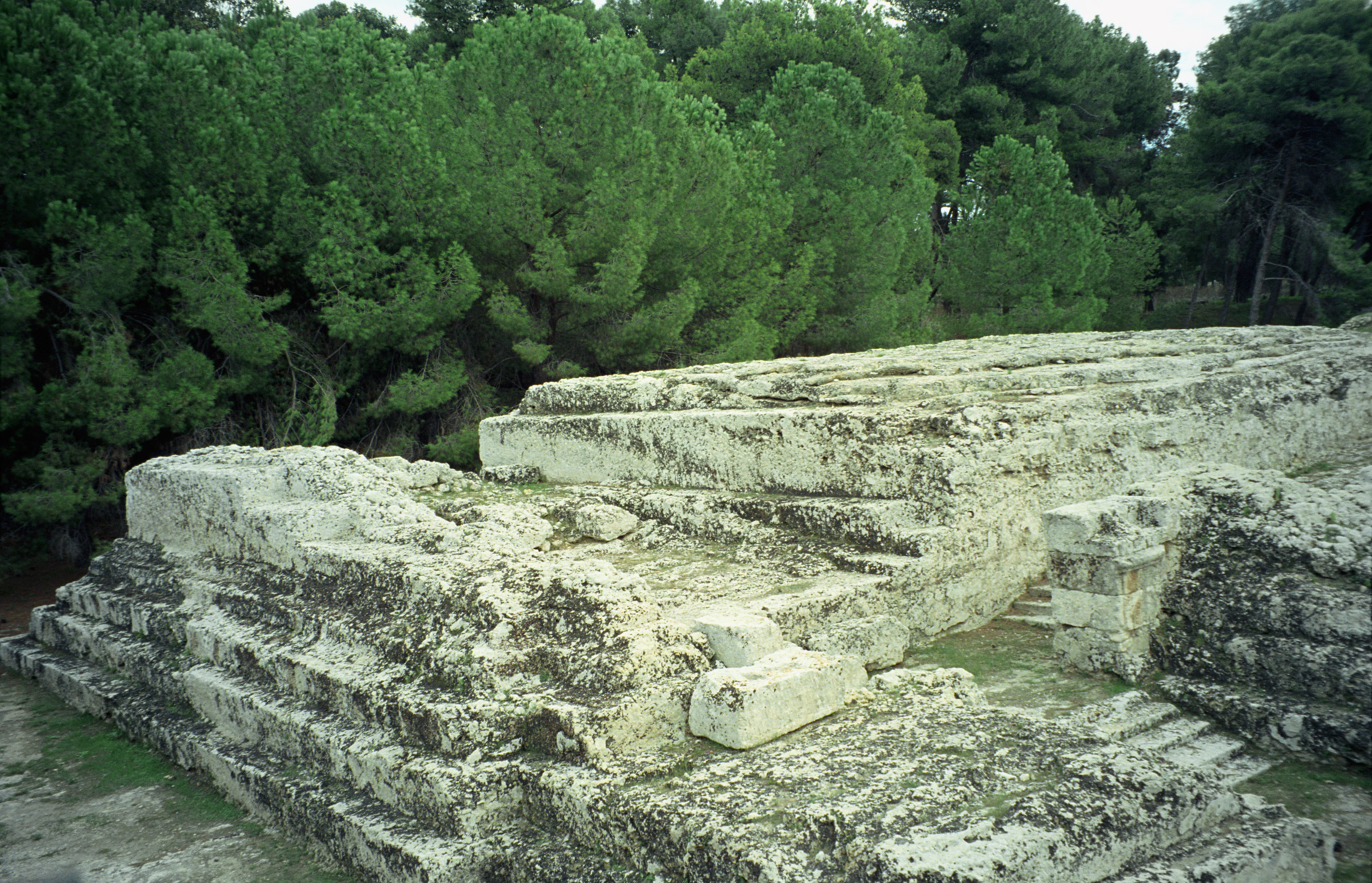
View of the northern staircase of the altar, from the northwest
