= Garamas =

- First Born
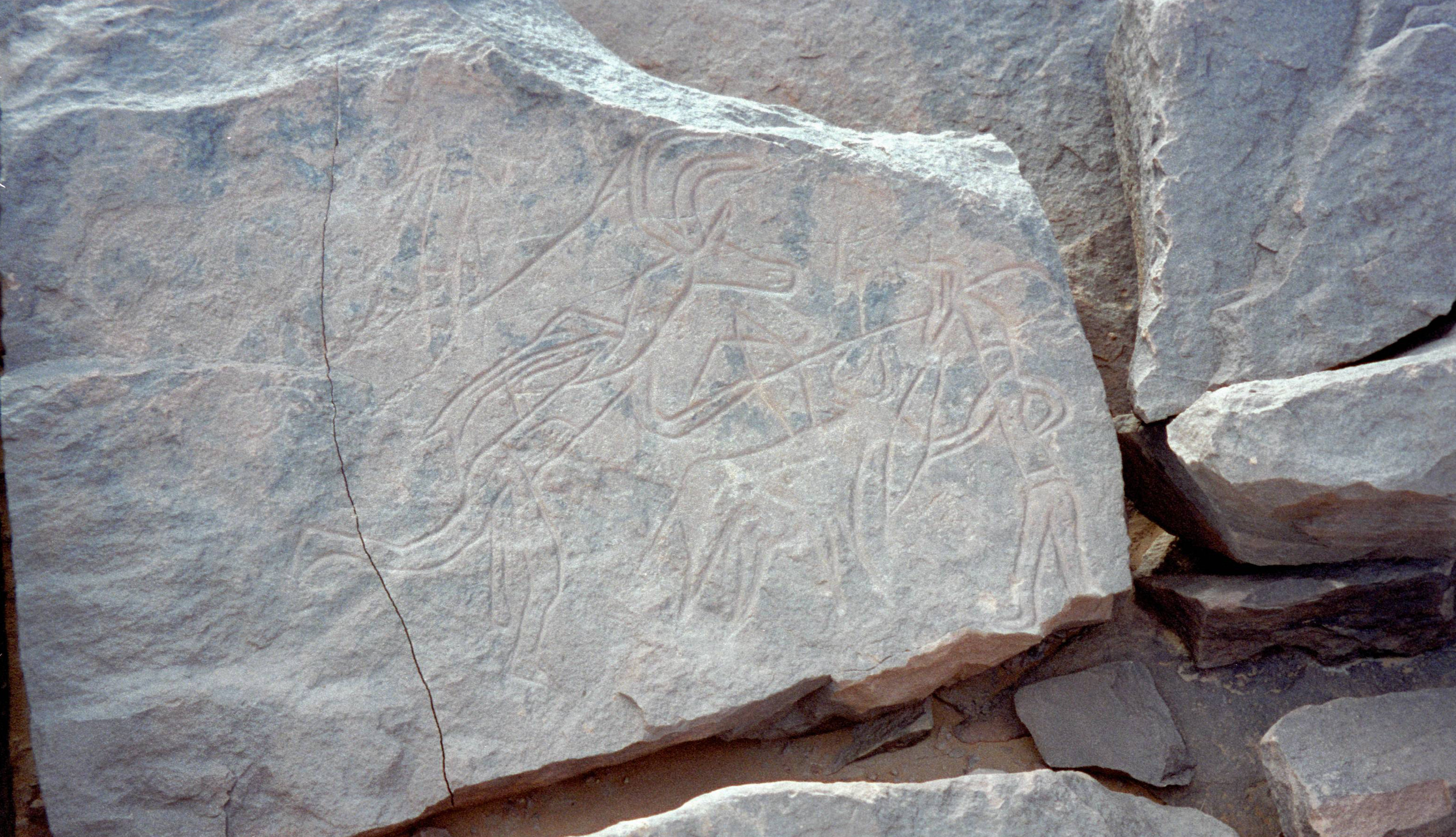
- Garamantian stone carving from Ubari
- Venerated in: Numitheism
- Major cult centre: Germa
- Abode: Ancient Libya
- Adherents: Garamantes (Berbers)
- Gender: Male
- Ethnic group: Berbers

Genealogy
- Parents: Apollo (father); Acallis (mother)
- Spouse: Tritonis
- Children: Nasamones, Caphaurus

Equivalents
- Greek: Amphithemis

In Greek mythology, Garamas (Ancient Greek: Γαράμας) was the mythical ancestor of the faction of Garamantes. The city of Garama in Libya was named after him. He was born in Libya, where Minos had banished his pregnant daughter, Acacallis in retribution for her having an illicit relationship with the sun god.

== Etymology ==
Garamas is a Berber name, as well as an eponym of the Garamantes, an ethnic group in Libya, and of their main city Garama. As a personal name, Garamas was attested in Augustine of Hippo's Epistles in the 4th or 5th century AD.

== Genealogy ==
Garamas is known as the ancestor of the faction of Garamantes, an ancient Berber faction that was very often discussed by both the ancient Greek historian Herodotus and the ancient Roman historian Pliny the Elder. According to Apollonius of Rhodes, Garamas was another name for Amphithemis; he consorted with a Libyan lake nymph, Tritonis, who bore him two sons, Nasamon and Caphaurus. The name of Caphaurus (who is also known as Cephalion) means 'camphor', which is presumably meant to indicate his somewhat exotic African origin. He was a shepherd who slew the Argonauts Eurybate (son of Teleon) and Canthus after they plundered his flocks.

== First man ==
A Greek poetic fragment preserved in the Refutation of All Heresies records several traditions saying humankind sprang from the earth. According to one of these traditions, the Libyans believed that the first man born this way was called Tarbas (Τάρβαντα). While some scholars, such as Friedrich Wilhelm Schneidewin think that this refers to Iarbas, others—including Theodor Bergk, Tadeusz Stefan Zieliński, Arthur Bernard Cook, and Paul Wendland—suggest that Garamas is more likely. This reading was translated by Werner Foerster and R. McL. Wilson:

But the Libyans say that Garamas was the first-born, who arose from the desert lands, and began upon the sweet acorn of Zeus.

The poem was attributed to Pindar by Schneidewin, and identified as his "Hymn to Zeus Ámmon" by Bergk.

Other translations of the passage interpret Garamas as making an offering, such as M. David Litwa's 2016 translation, which describes him as "the firstborn who rose up from the parched fields to offer the first fruits of Jove's sweet acorn".

== Archaeology ==
By AD 500, the last of the Garamantes people had either died or abandoned Garama, as underground water supplies dried up as a result of overexploitation.

== Further references ==
- Apollonius Rhodius, Argonautica translated by Robert Cooper Seaton (1853–1915), R. C. Loeb Classical Library Volume 001. London, William Heinemann Ltd, 1912. Online version at the Topos Text Project.
- Apollonius Rhodius, Argonautica. George W. Mooney. London. Longmans, Green. 1912. Greek text available at the Perseus Digital Library.
- Hyginus, Fabulae from The Myths of Hyginus translated and edited by Mary Grant. University of Kansas Publications in Humanistic Studies. Online version at the Topos Text Project.
- Nonnus of Panopolis, Dionysiaca translated by William Henry Denham Rouse (1863–1950), from the Loeb Classical Library, Cambridge, MA, Harvard University Press, 1940. Online version at the Topos Text Project.
- Nonnus of Panopolis, Dionysiaca. 3 Vols. W.H.D. Rouse. Cambridge, MA., Harvard University Press; London, William Heinemann, Ltd. 1940–1942. Greek text available at the Perseus Digital Library.
