= Jarma =

Jarma may refer to:

- Jarma (Libya), the capital of the ancient Garamantian Kingdom
- Jarma (Aksum), a capital of the ancient Kingdom of Aksum
- Jarma (beverage), a beverage of Kyrgyzstan
- Jarma District, a district in Kazakhstan
- Jarma, Pakistan, a place in Pakistan
- Jarma, Jharkhand, a village in Dhanbad district, Jharkhand, India
- Jarma, West Bengal, a village in Midnapore district, West Bengal, India
- Asheik Jarma, Nigerian politician

== See also ==
- Jerma (disambiguation)
- Germa (disambiguation)
- Djerma (disambiguation)
