= Eribotes =

Mythical son of Teleon

In Greek mythology, Eribotes (Ancient Greek: Ἐρυβώτης) was a Locrian who was counted among the Argonauts. He was the son of Teleon.

== Mythology ==
Eribotes appears to have had skills of a physician: in the Argonautica, he attends on Oileus when the latter is wounded by a feather of a Stymphalian bird.

One the return trip, Eribotes along with Canthus died. They were slain in Libya by the shepherd Cephalion, son of the nymph Tritonis and Amphithemis, whose flocks they were plundering.
