= Zarma =

Zarma оr Zerma may refer to:

- Zarma people, an ethnic group of West Africa
- Zarma language, a Songhai language
- Marina Zarma, Cypriot swimmer

== See also ==
- Djerma (disambiguation)
- Jerma (disambiguation)
