= Libya (mythology) =

Two characters in Greek mythology

In Greek mythology, Libya, Libye, Lybie or Lybee (Ancient Greek: Λιβύη, romanized: Libúē, Libuē, Libyē or Libýē or Λυβίη, Lybíē, pronounced [li.by̌ː.ɛː]) was a name shared by two individuals:

- Libya, daughter of the Titan Oceanus and Pompholyge, and the sister of Asia. In one account, Libya was the consort of the sea god Triton and by him the mother of various nymphs, probably including the Tritonian nymph who bore Nasamon and Caphaurus to Amphitemis.
- Libya, a princess of Egypt as the daughter of King Epaphus. She became the mother of Belus and Agenor by Poseidon, the god of the sea. Some sources describe her as the mother of Lamia. The ancient Greeks considered her the origin of the name of the place Libya.
