= Cephalion =

Cephalion (Greek: Κεφαλίων) may be:

- Cephalion, son of Amphithemis and the nymph Tritonis.
- Cephalion (historian), Roman historian of the time of Hadrian
