= Aghram Nadharif =

Archaeological site in the Fezzan region of Libya

Aghram Nadharif is an archaeological site located on the east side of Al Barkat and 10 km south of Ghat in the Fezzan region. Its citadel was founded by the Garamantes in the middle of the first century BC and fell into disrepair during the fourth century CE.

== See also ==
- Garamantes
