= Triton (mythology) =

Greek god, messenger of the sea

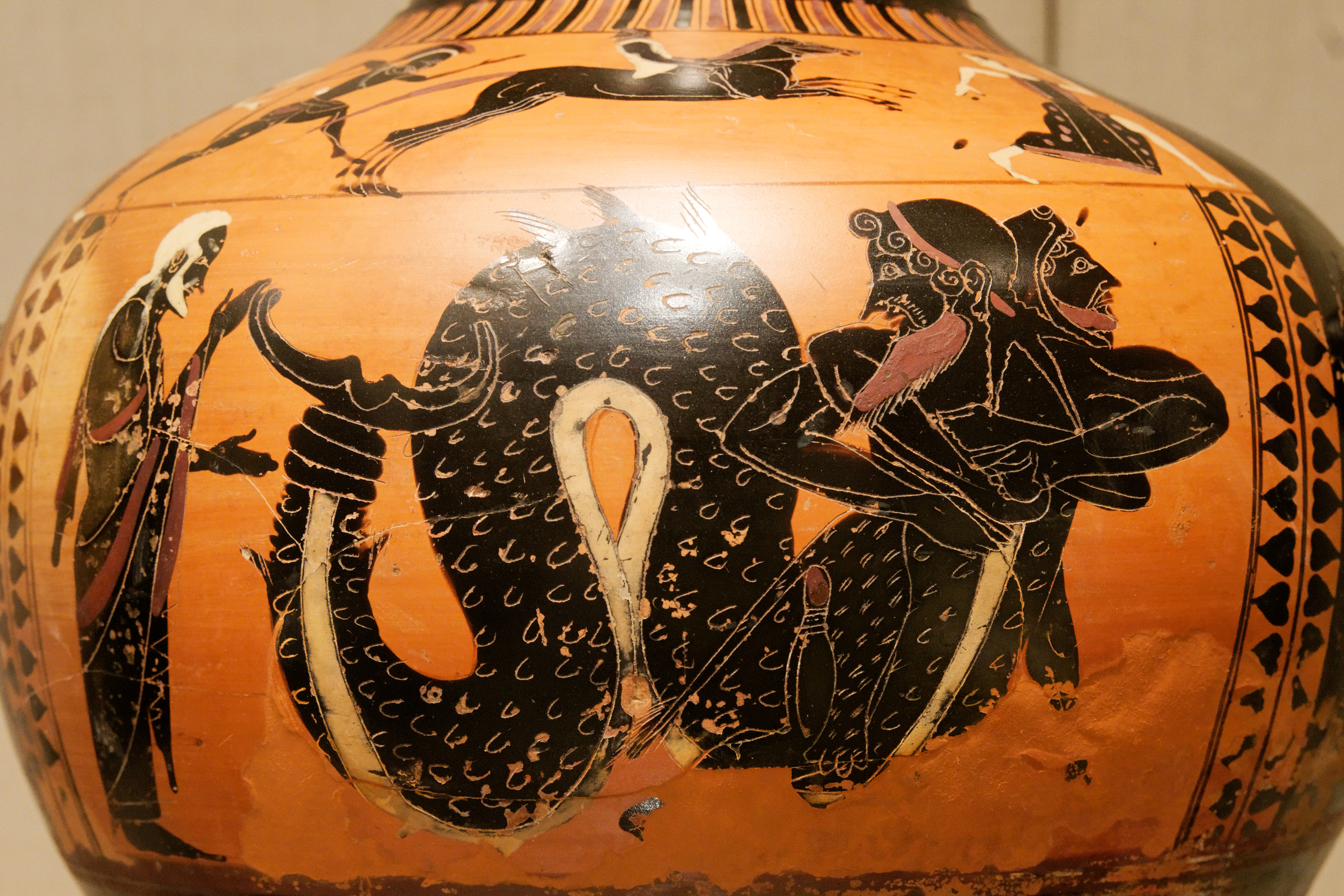
- Attic black-figure hydria, depicting Triton fought by Heracles.
- Abode: Sea
- Symbol: Conch shell

Genealogy
- Parents: Poseidon and Amphitrite
- Siblings: Rhodos, Benthesikyme, and several paternal half-siblings
- Consort: Libya
- Children: Triteia, Pallas, Calliste

Triton (/ˈtraɪtɒn/; Ancient Greek: Τρίτων, romanized: Trítōn) is a Greek god of the sea, the son of Poseidon and Amphitrite. Triton lived with his parents in a golden palace on the bottom of the sea. Later he is often depicted as having a conch shell he would blow like a trumpet.

Triton is usually represented as a merman, with the upper body of a human and the tailed lower body of a fish. At some time during the Greek and Roman era, Triton(s) became a generic term for a merman (mermen) in art and literature. In English literature, Triton is portrayed as the messenger or herald for the god Poseidon.

Triton of Lake Tritonis of ancient Libya is a namesake mythical figure that appeared and aided the Argonauts. Moreover, according to Apollonius Rhodius, he married the Oceanid of the said region, Libya.

== Sea god ==
Triton was the son of Poseidon and Amphitrite according to Hesiod's Theogony. He was the ruler (possessor) of the depths of the sea, who is either "dreadful" or "mighty" (δεινός) according to the epithet given him by Hesiod.

Triton dwelt with his parents in underwater golden palaces. Poseidon's golden palace was located at Aegae on Euboea in one passage of Homer's Iliad 12.21. (Note: Homer Iliad 8.203 also mentions "Aegaea" but this refers to Aegae (Achaea).)

Unlike his father Poseidon who is always fully anthropomorphic in ancient art, Triton's lower half is that of a fish, while the top half is presented in a human figure.

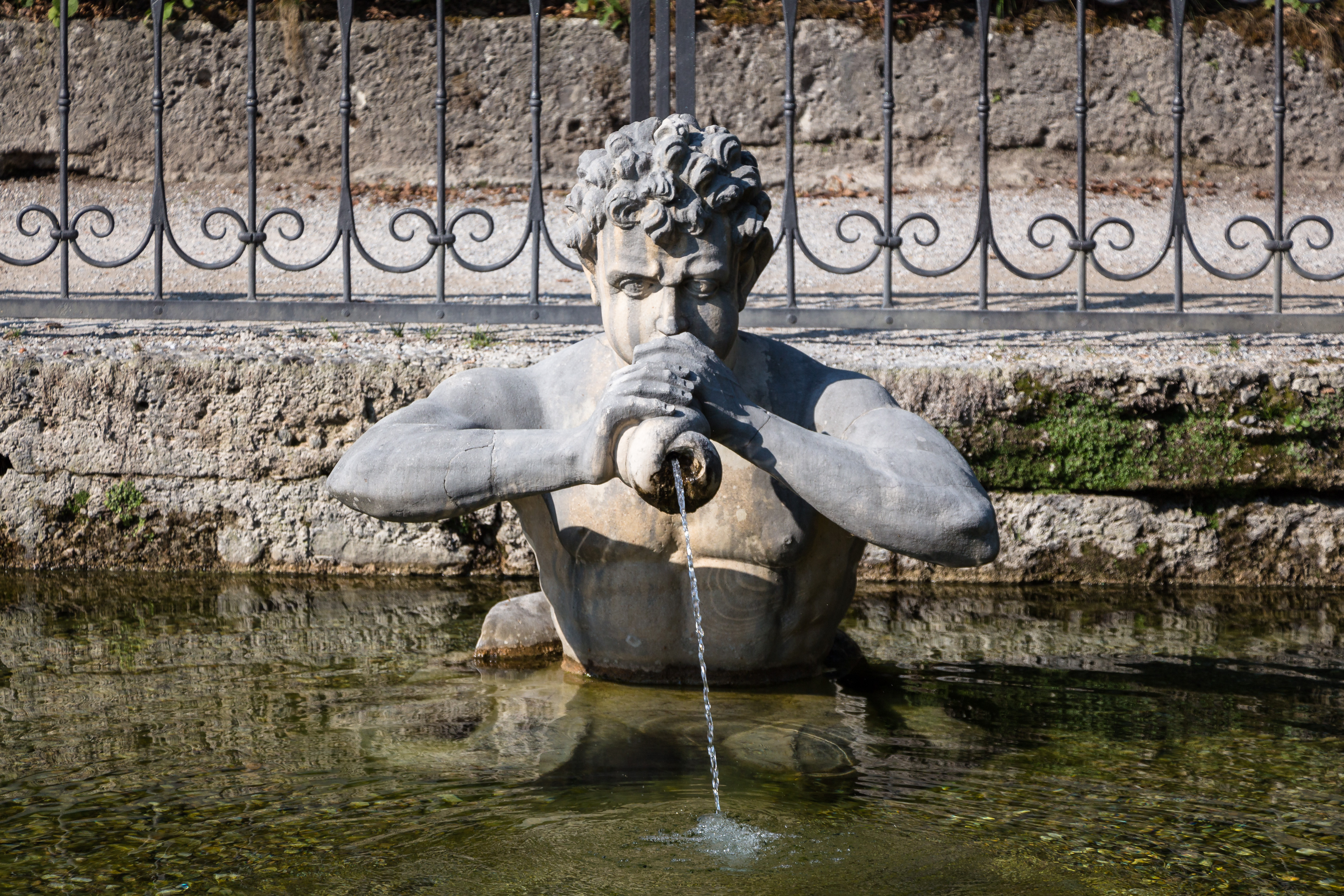
Triton blowing a conch. Statue at Wasserspiele Hellbrunn, Hellbrunn Palace, Salzburg, Austria

Triton in later times became associated with possessing a conch shell, which he blew like a trumpet to calm or raise the waves. (Note: Ovid, Metamorphoses 1.333 apud DGRBM) He was "trumpeter and bugler" to Oceanus and Poseidon. Its sound was so cacophonous that when loudly blown, it put the giants to flight, who imagined it to be the roar of a dark wild beast. (Note: Pseudo-Hyginus, Poetical astronomy ii. 23 apud DGRBM)

The original Greek Triton only sometimes bore a trident. In literature, Triton carries a trident in Accius's Medea fragment. (Note: A triton (see §Tritons below) and merman are synonymous in heraldry, and the figure may often carry a trident.)

Triton is "sea-hued" according to Ovid and "his shoulders barnacled with sea-shells". Ovid actually here calls Triton "cerulean" in color, to choose a cognate rendering to the original language (Latin: caeruleus); Ovid also includes Triton among other deities (Proteus, Aegaeon, Doris) of being this blue color, with green (viridis) hair, as well describing the steed Triton rides as cerulean. (Note: Ovid, Heroides 7.49–50: "caeruleis Triton per mare curret equis".)

== Libyan lake god ==
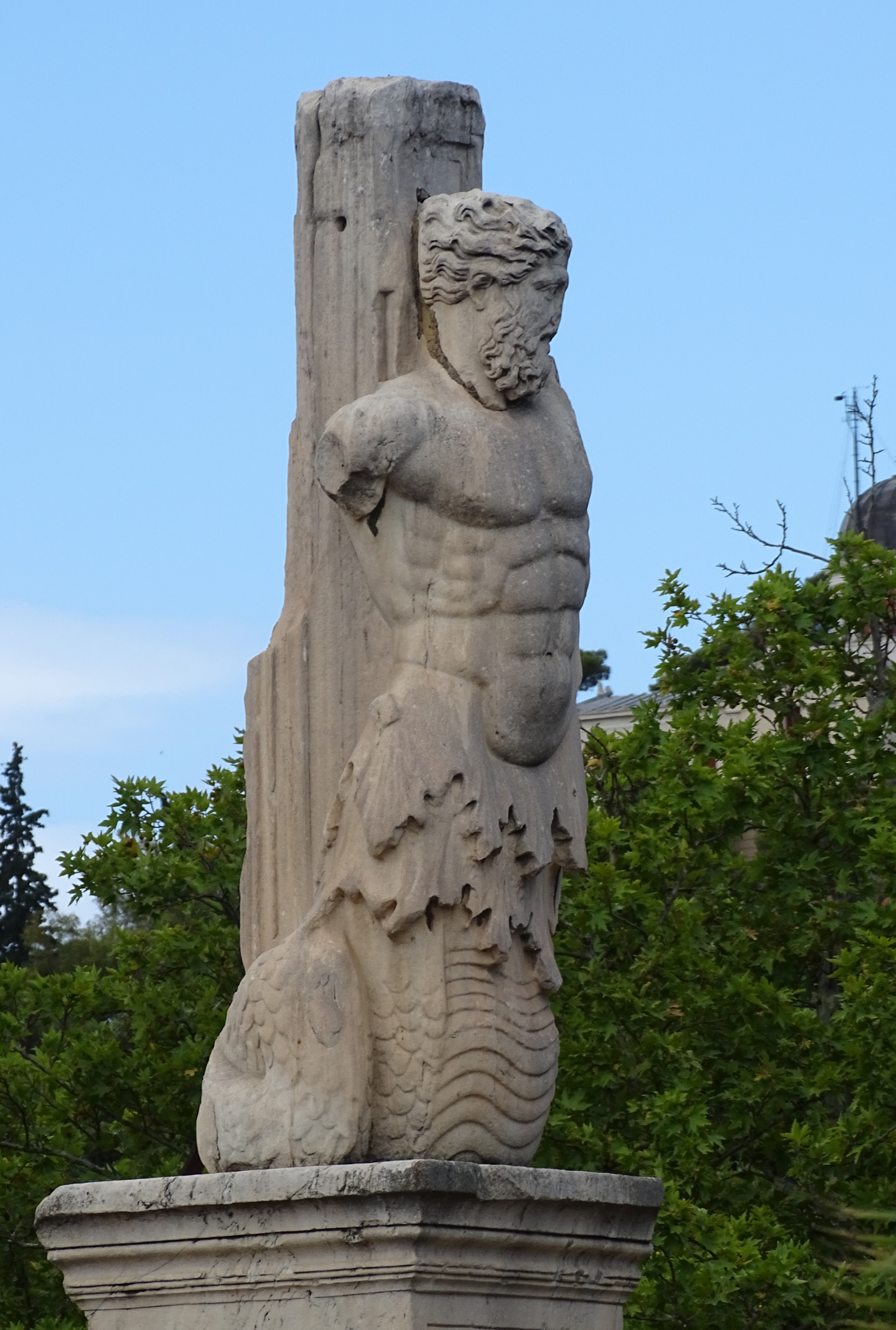
Relief of Triton from a pillar in the Odeon of Agrippa in the Ancient Agora of Athens, Greece.

There is also Triton, the god of Lake Tritonis of Ancient Libya encountered by the Argonauts. This Triton is treated as a separate deity in some references. He had a different parentage, as his father was Poseidon but his mother Europa according to the Greek writers of this episode. (Note: Pindar, Pythian 4. 45, Apollonius Argonautica I.179181). Jackson (1987), pp. 27, 28)

This Triton first appeared in the guise of Eurypylus before eventually revealing his divine nature. This local deity has thus been euhemeristically rationalized as "then ruler over Libya" by Diodorus Siculus.

Triton-Eurypylus welcomed the Argonauts with a guest-gift of a clod of earth which was a pledge that the Greeks would be granted the land of Cyrene, Libya in the future. The Argo had been driven ashore in the Syrtes (Gulf of Syrtes Minor according to some), and Triton guided them through the lake's marshy outlet back to the Mediterranean.

One of the works which recounts this adventure is Apollonius of Rhodes' Argonautica (3rd century BC), the first work in written literature that describes a Triton as "fish-tailed".

== Triton with men and heroes ==
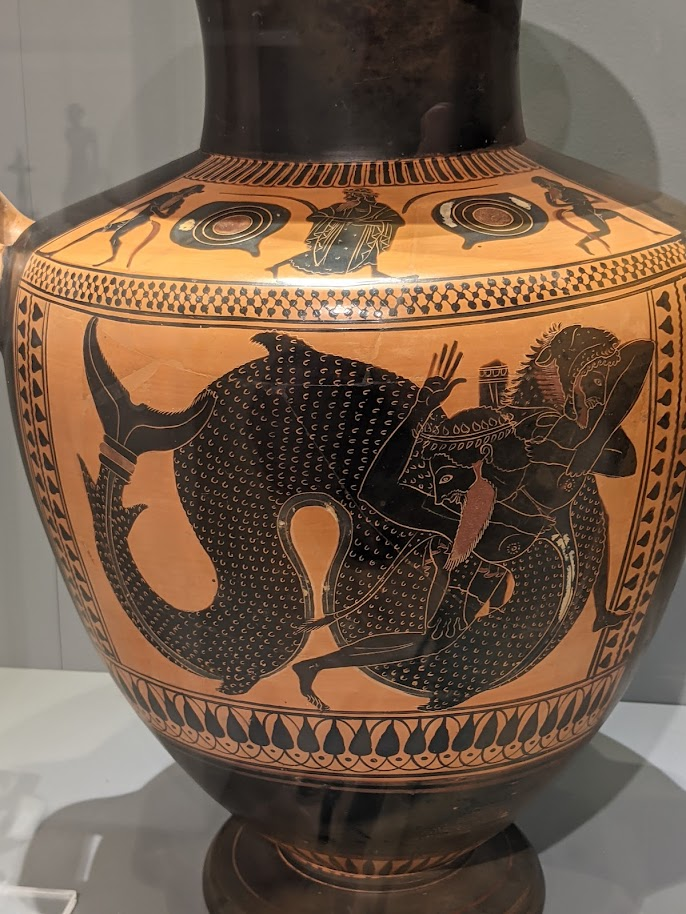
Attic black-figure hydria attributed to the Rycroft Painter, dating c. 520–c. 510 BCE, depicting Heracles wrestling Triton, Eskenazi Museum of Art

In Virgil's Aeneid, book 6, it is told that Triton killed Misenus, son of Aeolus, by drowning him after he challenged the gods to play as well as he did.

=== Iconography of Triton duels ===
Herakles wrestling Triton is a common theme in Classical Greek art particularly black-figure pottery, but no literature survives that tells the story. In fewer examples, the Greek pottery depicting apparently the same motif are labeled "Nereus" or "Old Man of the Sea" instead, and among these, Nereus' struggle with Herakles is attested in literature (Pseudo-Apollodorus, Bibliotheca). "Old Man of the Sea" is a generic term applicable to Nereus, who was also frequently depicted as half-fishlike. One explanation is that some vase painters developed the convention of depicting Nereus as a fully human form, so that Triton had to be substituted in the depiction of the sea-monster wrestling Herakles. And Nereus appears as a spectator in some examples of this motif.

In the red-figure period, the Triton-Herakles theme became completely outmoded, supplanted by such scenes as Theseus's adventures in Poseidon's golden mansion, embellished with the presence of Triton. Again, extant literature describing the adventure omits any mention of Triton, but placement of Triton in the scene is not implausible.

== Further genealogy ==
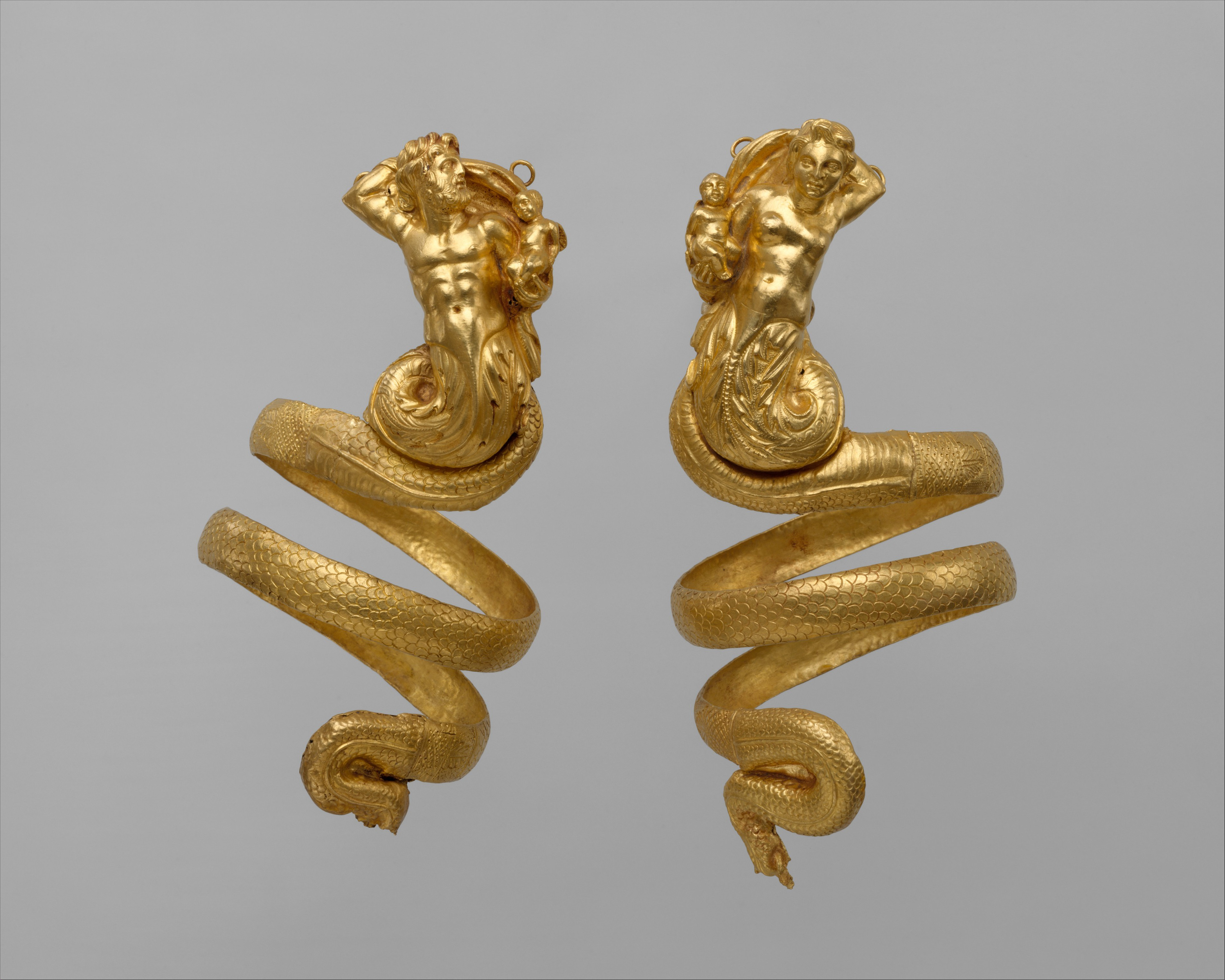
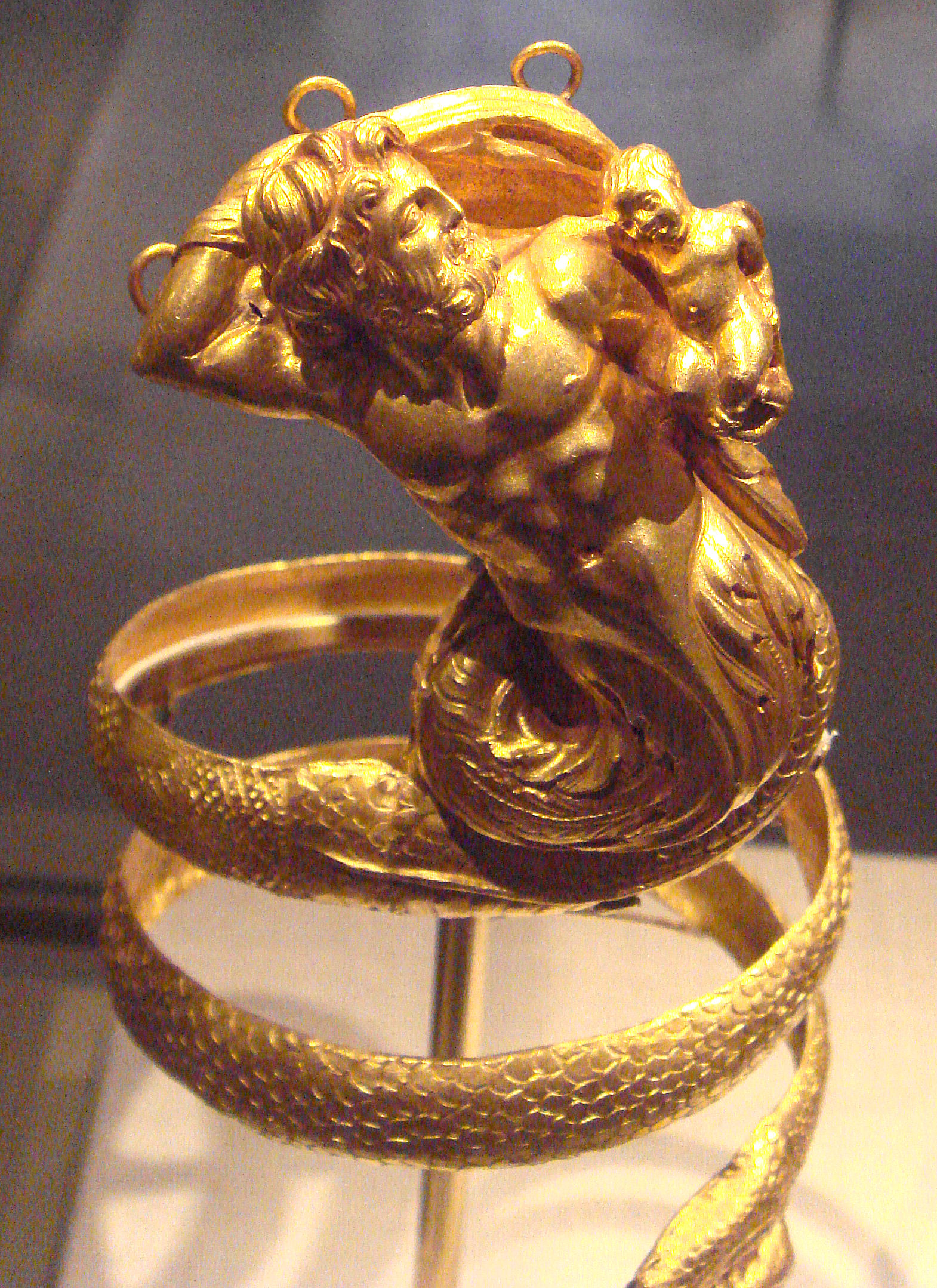
A pair of gold armbands, with a triton and tritoness respectively (left). The bearded triton band in detail (right). Both figures are holding a putto (perhaps Eros).
―Greek, 200 BC, Metropolitan Museum of Art.

Triton was the father of a daughter named Pallas and foster parent to the goddess Athena, according to Pseudo-Apollodorus's Bibliotheca. (Note: In this story, Pallas was inadvertently killed by Athena during sparring, and the goddess subsequently took a wooden figurine of Pallas and wrapped the Aegis (goat-skin) around it, thus creating the palladium.) Elsewhere in the Bibliotheca, there appears a different Pallas, a male figure overcome by Athena. (Note: In Apollod. 1.6, Frazer ed., the Pallas who Athena slew and whose flayed skin she used as shield-covering, which DGRBM says was a giant ( "Pallas (3)"). Cf. Frazer, note 8 and DGRBM "Pallas (5)".)

Athena bears the epithet Tritogeneia (Τριτογένεια) "Triton-born" and while this is suggestive of Triton's daughter being Athena, (Note: Connelly claims this is so in some sources.) the appellation is otherwise explainable in several ways, e.g., as Athena's birth (from Zeus's head) taking place at the River Triton or Lake Tritonis.

Triton also had a daughter named Triteia. According to Pausanias writing in the 2nd century CE, one origin story of the city of Triteia held that this was an eponymous city after Triteia, founded by her and Ares's son, named Melanippus ("Black Horse").

== Tritons ==
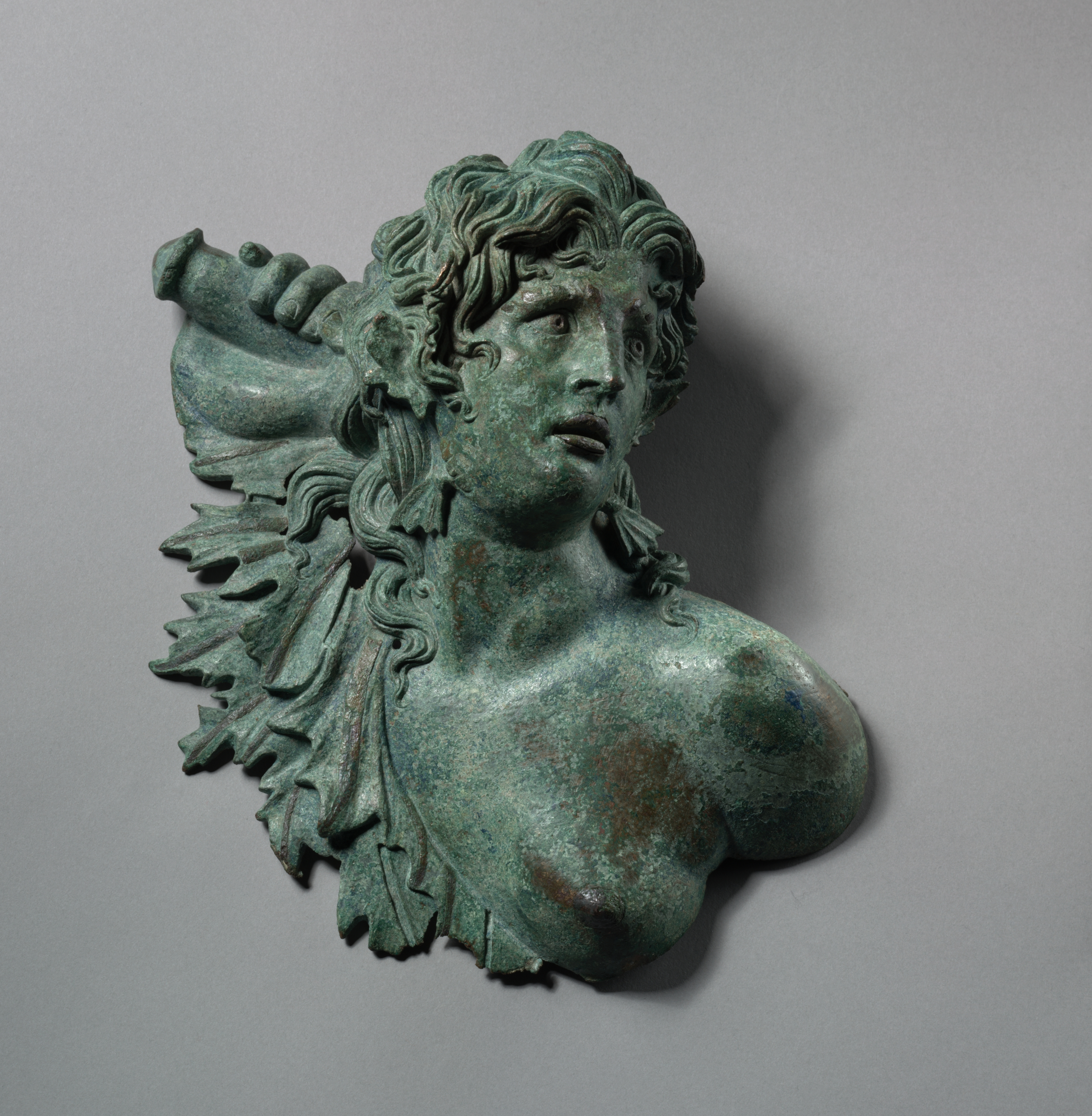
Tritoness bronze applique, Greek, 2nd century BC, Cleveland Museum of Art

At some time during the Greco-Roman period, "Tritons", in the plural, came to be used a generic term for mermen.

=== Hellenistic and Roman art ===
Greek pottery depicting a half-human, half-fish being bearing an inscription of "Triton" is popular by the 6th century BC. It has also been hypothesized that by this time "Triton" has become a generic term for a merman. (Note: As aforementioned, "Triton" is the most common label, but "Nereus", and "Old Man of the Sea" are found as inscriptions in six century pottery depicting the motif of Herakles wrestling a sea-monster.)

Furthermore, Tritons in groups or multitudes began to be depicted in Classical Greek art by around the 4th century BC. (Note: Excepting Etruscan art, which has older examples.) Among these is the work by Greek sculptor Scopas (d. 350 BC) which was later removed to Rome. The sirens of Homer's Odyssey were sometimes being depicted, not as human-headed birds but as tritonesses by around this time, as seen in a bowl dated to the 3rd century BC, (Note: Mold-made Megarian bowl from Cistern on Areopagus. Excavation of the Athenian Agora, catalogued P 18,640.) and this is explained as a conflation with Odysseus's Scylla and Charybdis episode.

Though not a contemporaneous inscription or commentary, Pliny (d. 79 CE) commented on the work that "there are Nereids riding on dolphins… and also Tritons" in this sculpture.

In later Greek periods into the Roman period Tritons were depicted as ichthyocentaurs, i.e., merman with a horse's forelegs in place of arms. The earliest known examples are from the 2nd century BC. (Note: Among the relief groups in the Pergamon Altar.) The term "Ichthyocentaur" did not originate in Ancient Greece, and only appeared in writing in the Byzantine period (12th century); "Centaur-Triton" is another word for a Triton with horse-legs.

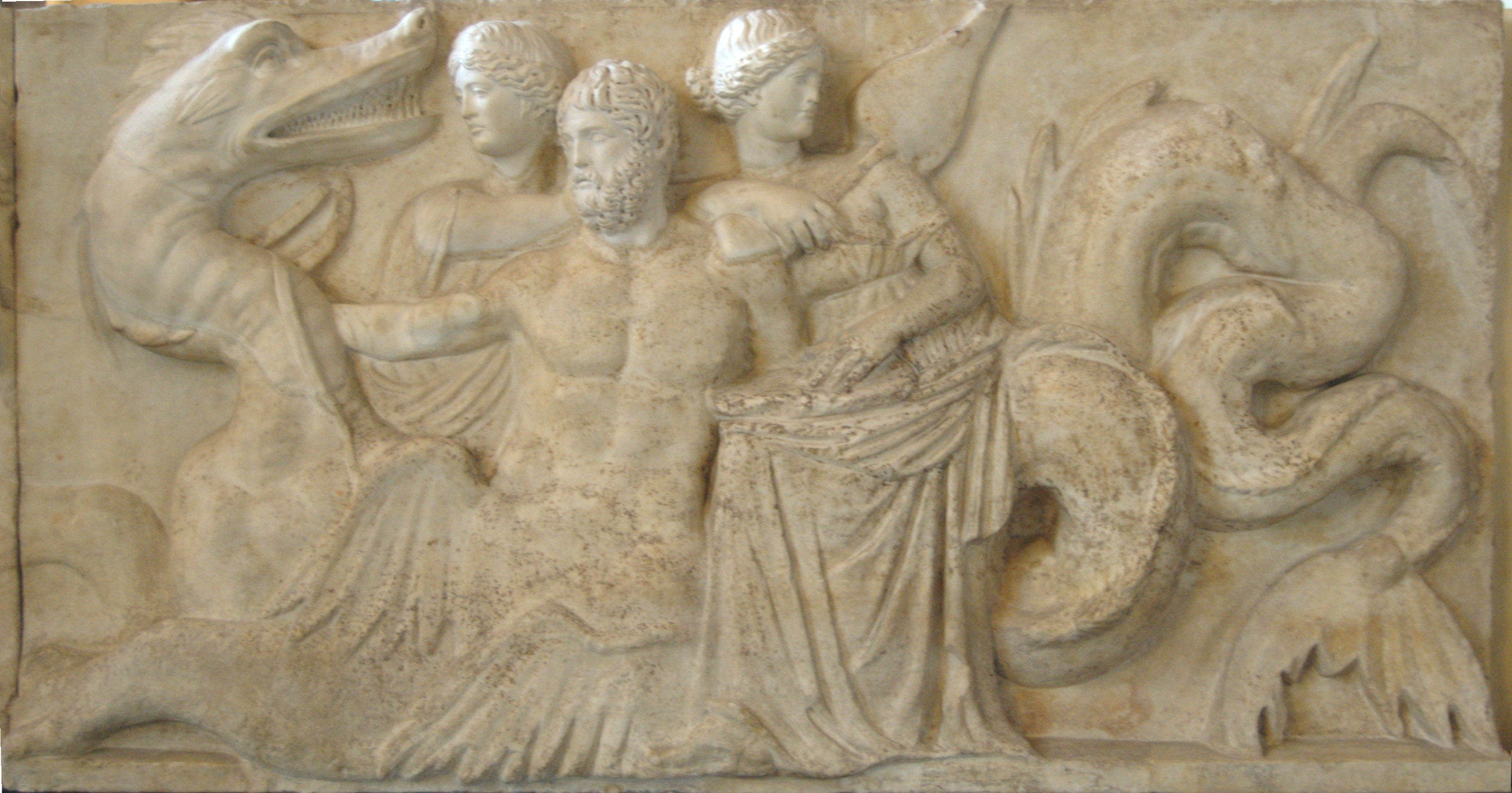
Triton with wings instead of forelegs. Bas-Relief. Glyptothek Munich 239.

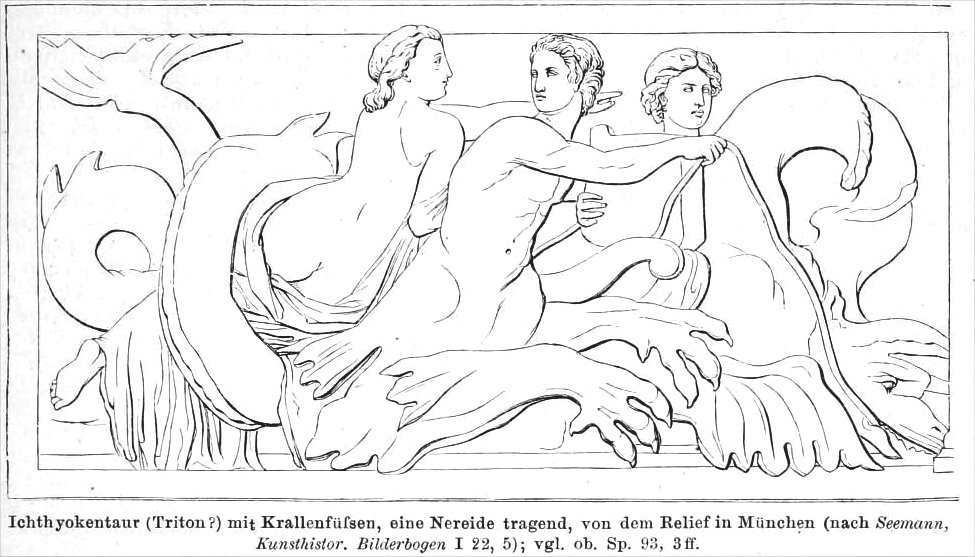
Triton with clawed feet. Sketch of relief sculpture. Glyptothek Munich 115.

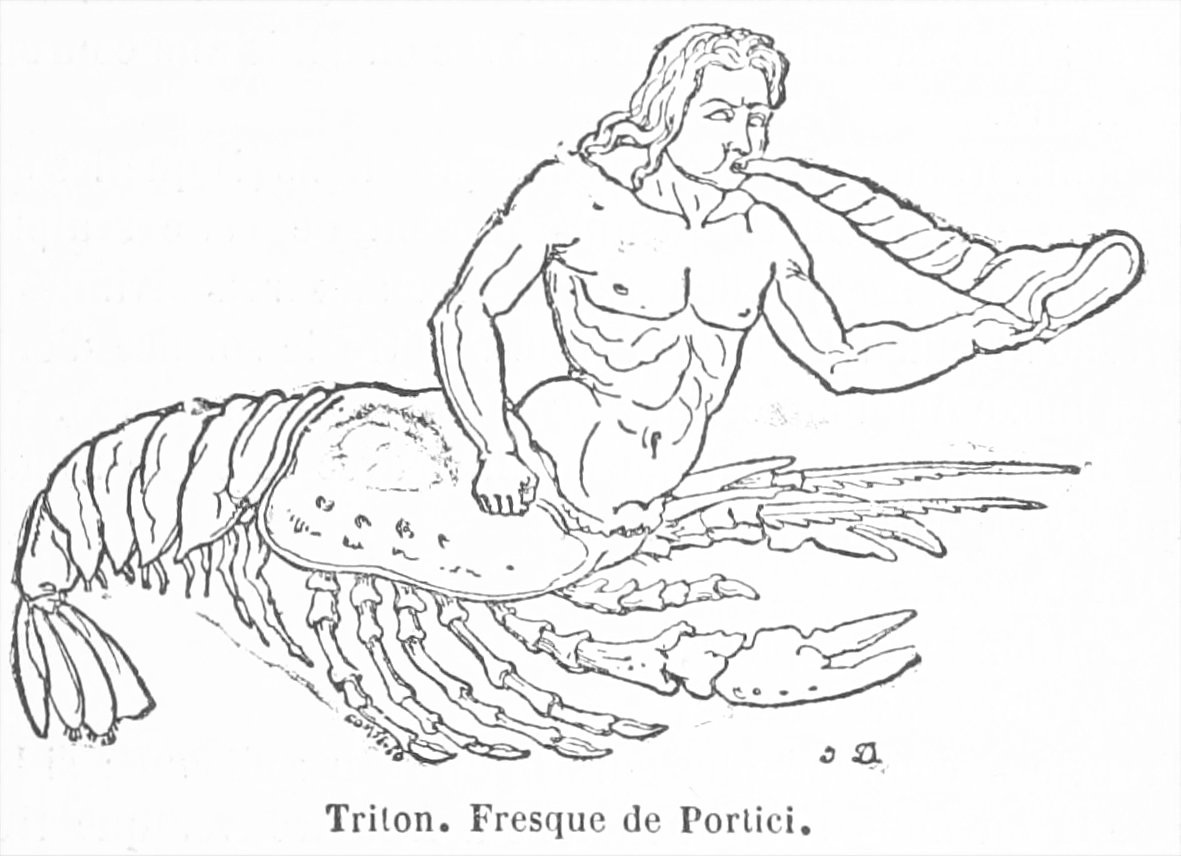
Triton half-man, half-lobster. Herculanum fresco, formerly held at Museo di Portici.

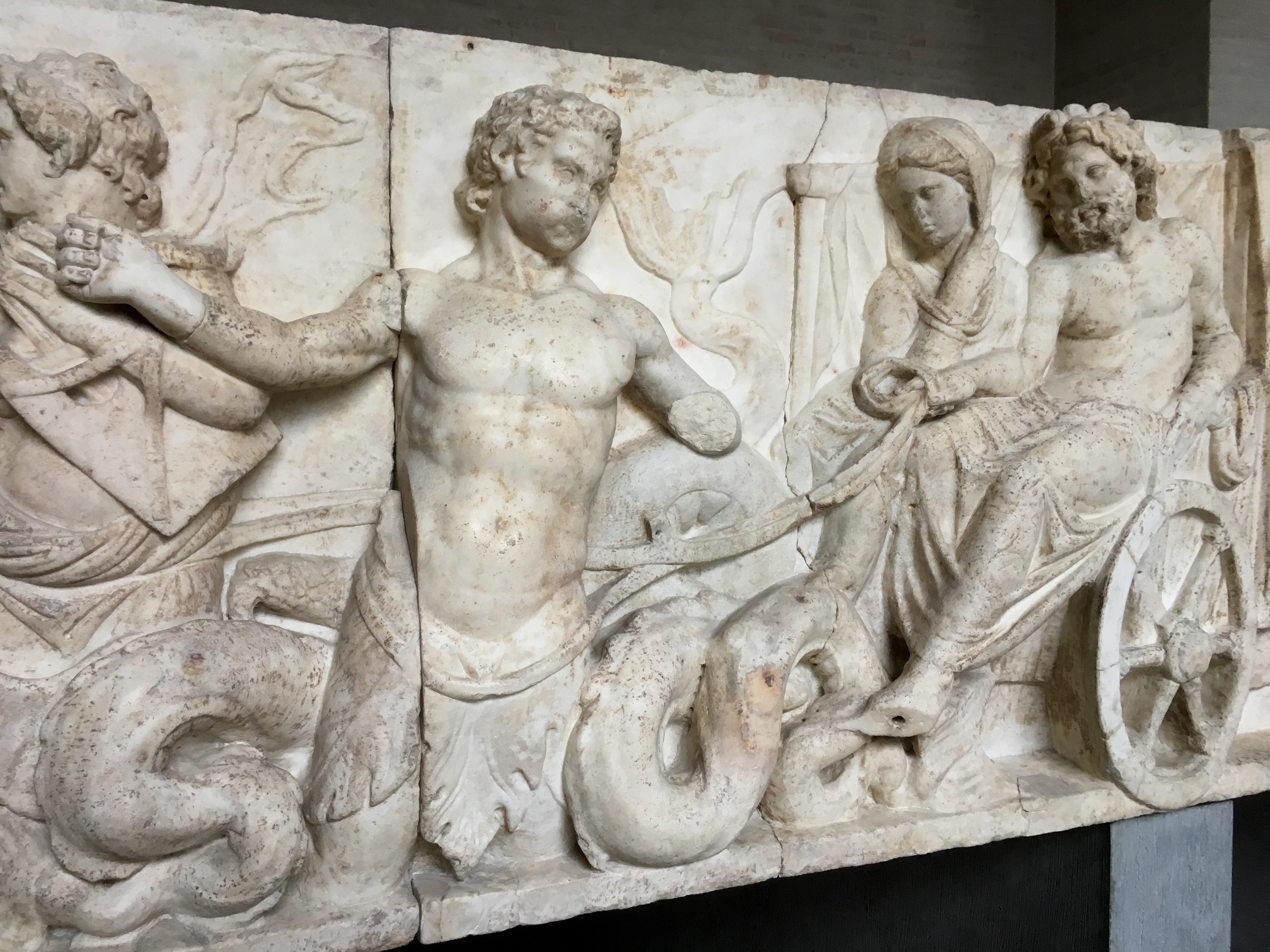
Triton with two fish-tails. Altar of Domitius Ahenobarbus. Glyptothek Munich.

Besides examples in which the horse-like forelimbs have been replaced by wings, there are other examples where the forelegs have several clawed digits (somewhat like lions), as in one relief at the Glyptothek in Munich, Germany. A Triton with a lower extremity like a lobster or crayfish, in a fresco unearthed from Herculanum has been mentioned.

Double-tailed tritons began to be depicted by the late 2nd century BC, such as in the Altar of Domitius Ahenobarbus. Rumpf thought that might be the earliest example of a "Triton with two fish-tails (Triton mit zwei Fischschwänzen)". However the double-tailed tritonesses in Damophon's sculptures at Lycosura predates it, and even this is doubted to be the first example. Lattimore believed the two-tailed triton should be dated to the 4th century BC, and speculated that Skopas was the one to devise it. (Note: Skopa's sculpture is long lost. Cf. A. F. Stewart's remark that hypotheses on a lost work causes Lattimore to adopt an equivocal ("might-have-beens"), though Lattimore is uniquely resolute on the "conclusion [that] the double-tailed Triton was probably Skopas's creation (p. 61)".)

As aforementioned, there is the female version of the half-human, half-fishlike being, sometimes called a "tritoness" or a "female triton".

=== Literature in the Roman period ===
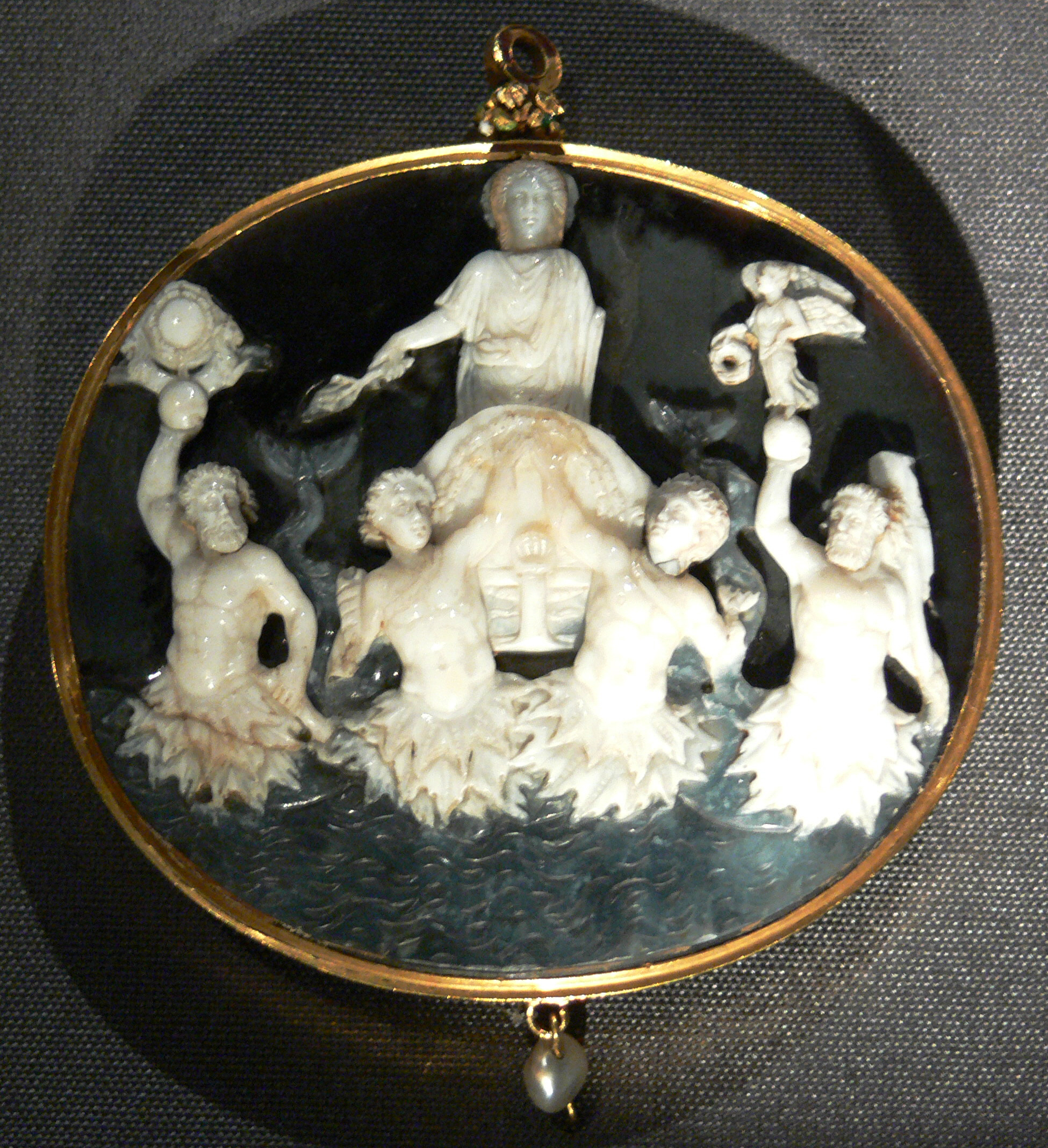
Cameo of Augustus in a quadriga drawn by tritons (Kunsthistorisches Museum)

The first literary attestation of Tritons (Latin: Trītōnēs) in the plural was Virgil's Aeneid (c. 29–19 BC). In the 1st century CE, another Latin poet Valerius Flaccus wrote in Argonautica that there was a huge Triton at each side of Neptune's chariot, holding the reins of horses. And Statius (1st century) makes a Triton figurehead adorn the prow of the Argo. (Note: Thebaid 5.371f.)

Tritons and nereids appear as marine retinues (Latin: marinum obsequium) to the goddess Venus in Apuleius's Metamorphoses, or "The Golden Ass".

=== Pausanias ===
Tritons (Greek: Τρίτωνες, romanized: Trítōnes) were described in detail in the 2nd century CE by Pausanias (ix. 21).

The Tritons have the following appearance. On their heads they grow hair like that of marsh frogs (Ancient Greek: βατράχιον, plants of the Ranunculus or buttercup genus (Note: Translated as "parsley which grows in marshes" by Taylor.)) not only in color, but in the impossibility of separating one hair from another. The rest of their body is rough with fine scales just as is the shark. Under their ears they have gills and a man's nose; but the mouth is broader and the teeth are those of a beast. Their eyes seem to me blue, (Note: Ancient Greek: γλαυκός. Defined "freq. of the eye, light blue, grey", in Liddle-Scott-Jones, "γλαυκός".) and they have hands, fingers, and nails like the shells of the murex. Under the breast and belly is a tail like a dolphin's instead of feet.

Pausanias was basing his descriptions on a headless Triton exhibited in Tanagra and another curiosity in Rome. These Tritons were preserved mummies or taxidermied real animals or humans (or fabrication made to appear as such). The Tanagran Triton was seen by Aelian who described it as an embalmed or stuffed mummy (Ancient Greek: τάριχος). (Note: Aelian, De Natura Animalium, xiii, 21, apud Frazer) While Pausanias related a legend around the Tanagran Triton that its head was cut off, J. G. Frazer conjectured that such a cover story had to be invented after a sea mammal's carcass with a severed or severely mutilated head was passed off as a Triton. (Note: Tritons were the aquatic versions of Satyrs and Centaur "relicts", i.e., creatures purported to exist and exhibited in Greek and Roman times.)

== Renaissance ==
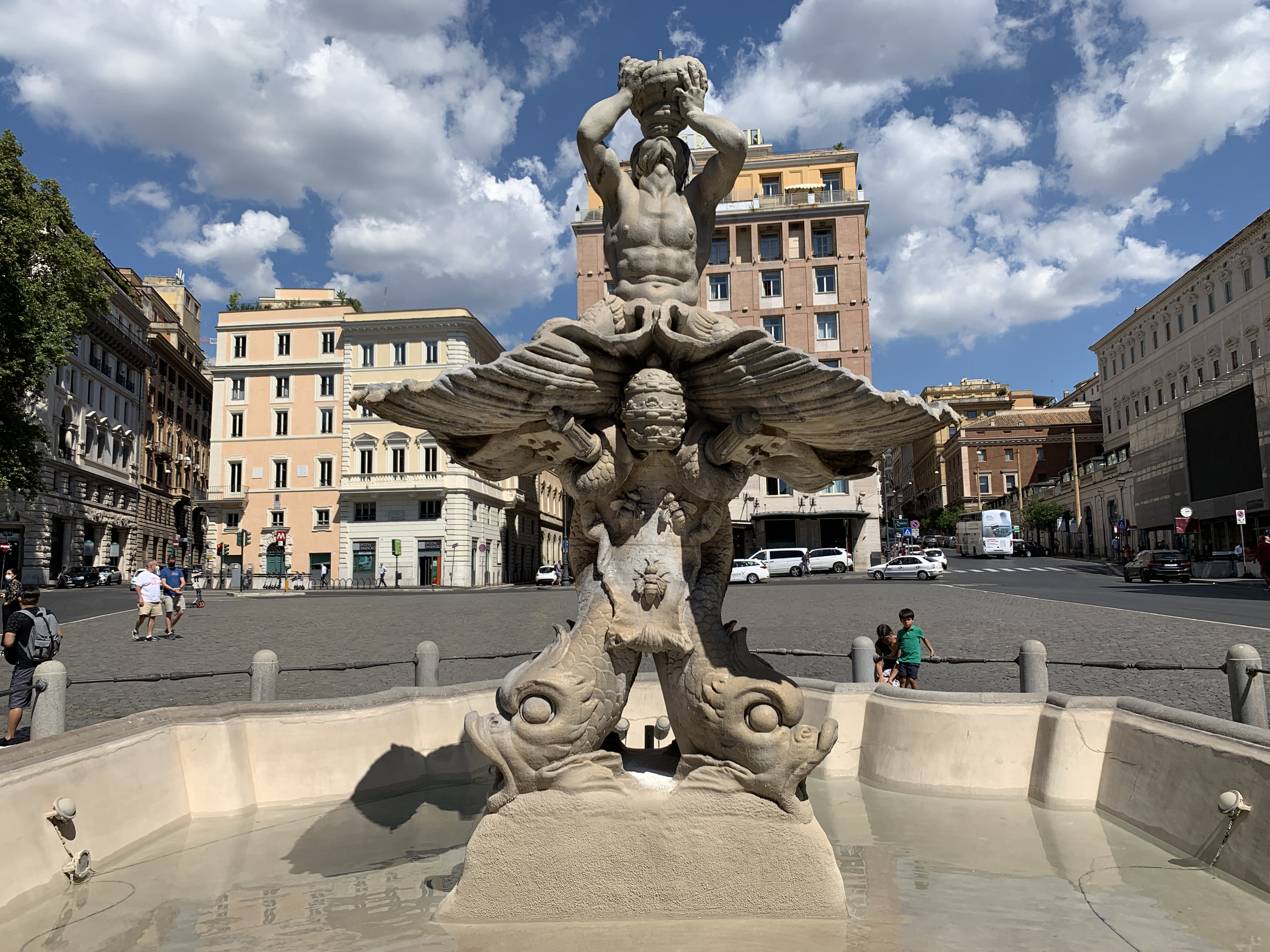
The Triton Fountain (1642–3), by Gianlorenzo Bernini, Rome

Triton was referred to as "trumpeter of Neptune (Neptuni tubicen)" in Cristoforo Landino (d. 1498)'s commentary on Virgil; this phrasing later appeared in the gloss for "Triton" in Marius Nizolius's Thesaurus (1551), and Konrad Gesner's book (1558).

Triton makes appearance in English literature as the messenger for the god Poseidon. In Edmund Spenser's Faerie Queene, Triton blew "his trompet shrill before" Neptune and Amphitrite. And in Milton (1637), "Lycidas" v. 89, "The Herald of the Sea" refers to Triton.

Gianlorenzo Bernini sculpted the "Neptune and Triton" fountain (1622–23) now in the Victoria and Albert Museum and the Triton Fountain (1642–43) in Bernini Square, Rome. There is differing opinion on what earlier works he may have drawn from near-contemporary works or examples from antiquity. He may have been influenced by Battista di Domenico Lorenzi's Alpheus and Arethusa (1568–70) or his Triton blowing the conch (late 1570s), or Stoldo Lorenzi's Neptune fountain. But Rudolf Wittkower has cautioned against exaggerating the influences of Florentine fountains. It has been pointed out that Bernini had access to the Papal collection (Note: As a favorite of Paul V (d. 1621). Urban VIII (elected 1623) became his great patron.) of genuine Greco-Roman sculptures, and worked with restoring ancient fragments, although it is unclear if any Triton was among these. It is within the realm of possibilities that Bernini might have used as his model the ancient Altar of Domitius Ahenobarbus, which does include Triton in its composition. The Triton of this altar, the Stoldo Lorenzi Triton and the Bernini Triton are all double-tailed, like a pair of human legs.

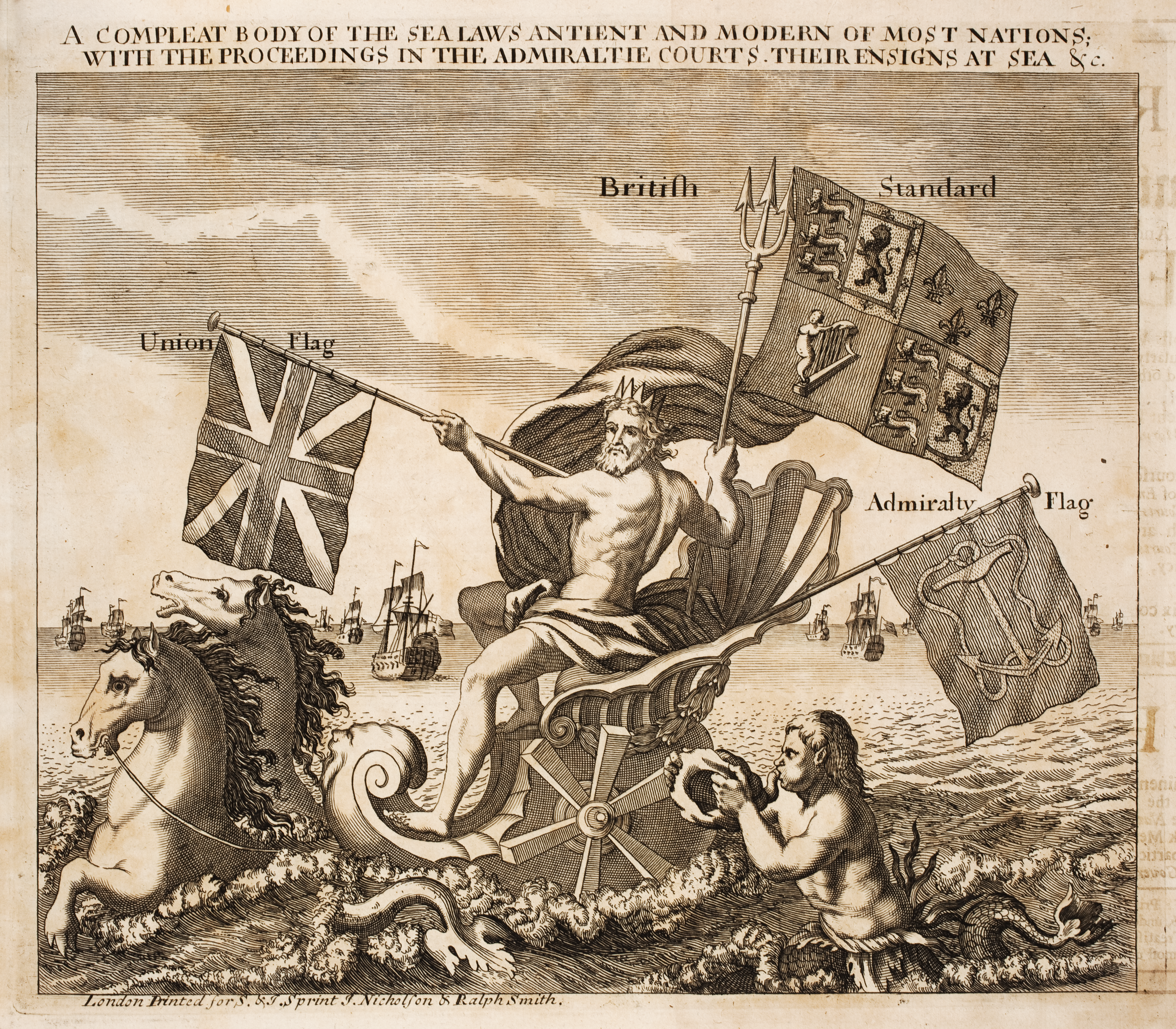
A Triton blowing on a conch on this title page of Alexander Justice, Samuel Pepys and Josiah Burchett: A general treatise of the dominion of the sea, 1710

== Romantic era ==
In Wordsworth's sonnet "The World Is Too Much with Us" (c. 1802, published 1807), the poet regrets the prosaic humdrum modern world, yearning for

glimpses that would make me less forlorn;
Have sight of Proteus rising from the sea;
Or hear old Triton blow his wreathèd horn.

== Mascot ==
There are numerous universities, colleges, and high schools and businesses that use Triton as their mascot. These include the following:

- University of California, San Diego, La Jolla, California
- Eckerd College, St. Petersburg, Florida
- Edmonds College, Lynnwood, Washington
- Iowa Central Community College, Fort Dodge, Iowa
- Mariner High School, Cape Coral, Florida
- Notre Dame Academy, Green Bay, Wisconsin
- San Clemente High School (San Clemente, California)
- University of Guam, Mangilao, Guam
- University of Missouri–St. Louis
- University of Rennes 1, Brittany France

Many club sports teams, especially swimming leagues, use the symbol of Triton.

- Drew Marine, a leading maritime company, also uses the symbol

== Eponyms ==
The largest moon of the planet Neptune has been given the name Triton, as Neptune is the Roman equivalent of Poseidon. A family of large sea snails, the shells of some of which have been used as trumpets since antiquity, are commonly known as "tritons", see Triton (gastropod).

The name Triton is associated in modern industry with tough hard-wearing machines such as the Ford Triton engine and Mitsubishi Triton pickup truck.

The USS Triton (SSN-586) was the only attack submarine of her class, and the only US Navy nuclear-powered submarine to have two reactors. She was decommissioned in 1969 and languished awaiting scrapping until 2007, which began at Puget Sound Naval Shipyard, and was completed as of 30 November 2009.
