= Psylli =

The Psylli (Seli) were a native Libyan tribe inhabiting Ancient Libya.

== Historical accounts ==
Pliny the Elder (Hist. Nat., vii 14) places the Psylli on the Syrtic coast above the Garamantes, and gives Psyllikos Kolpos as an early name of the Syrtic Gulf.

According to John C. Murphy, "the Psylli were the displaced remnants of an ancient Libyan tribe that lived on the Gulf of Sidra. Conquered by the nomadic Nasamones, the Psylli became a well-known snake-charming sect."

Of the Psylli, Herodotus described "a tribe that met with extinction" after the desert wind dried up their water holes (IV.173). Pliny the Elder said that they were "almost exterminated" in a war with their neighbours, the Nasamones, but the descendants of those who escaped "survive today in a few places" (VII.2.14). Strabo does not mention an unsuccessful war against either the desert wind or the Nasamones but only that the Psylli were still in existence, occupying "a barren and arid region" (XVII.3.23) below the Nasamones. Later writers, especially poets, bestowed on the Psylli a reputation as great snake charmers.

In his Roman History, Cassius Dio makes reference to the Psylli as being sought out by Octavian to draw out the snake venom with which Cleopatra had poisoned herself (LI.14). According to Dio, the Psylli were completely immune to snake bites and were all male (LI.14). Lucan, speaking of the Psylli, whose peculiar property it was to be unhurt by the bite of serpents with which their country abounded, wrote:

Of all who scorching Afric's sun endure,

None like the swarthy Psyllians are secure:

With healing gifts and privileges graced,

Well in the land of serpents were they placed:

Truce with the dreadful tyrant death they have,

And border safely on his realm the grave.

— Pharsalia ix. 891, trans. by Rowe

== Customs ==
It is claimed that the Psylli employed tests by animals in order to find out if their offspring was genuine and at the same time if their wives were faithful. Infant Psylli were subjected to snake-bites. If the infant died of the snakebite, illegitimacy was supposed to be implied.
