= Pseudo-Chalkidian vase painting =

Style of black-figure Greek vase painting

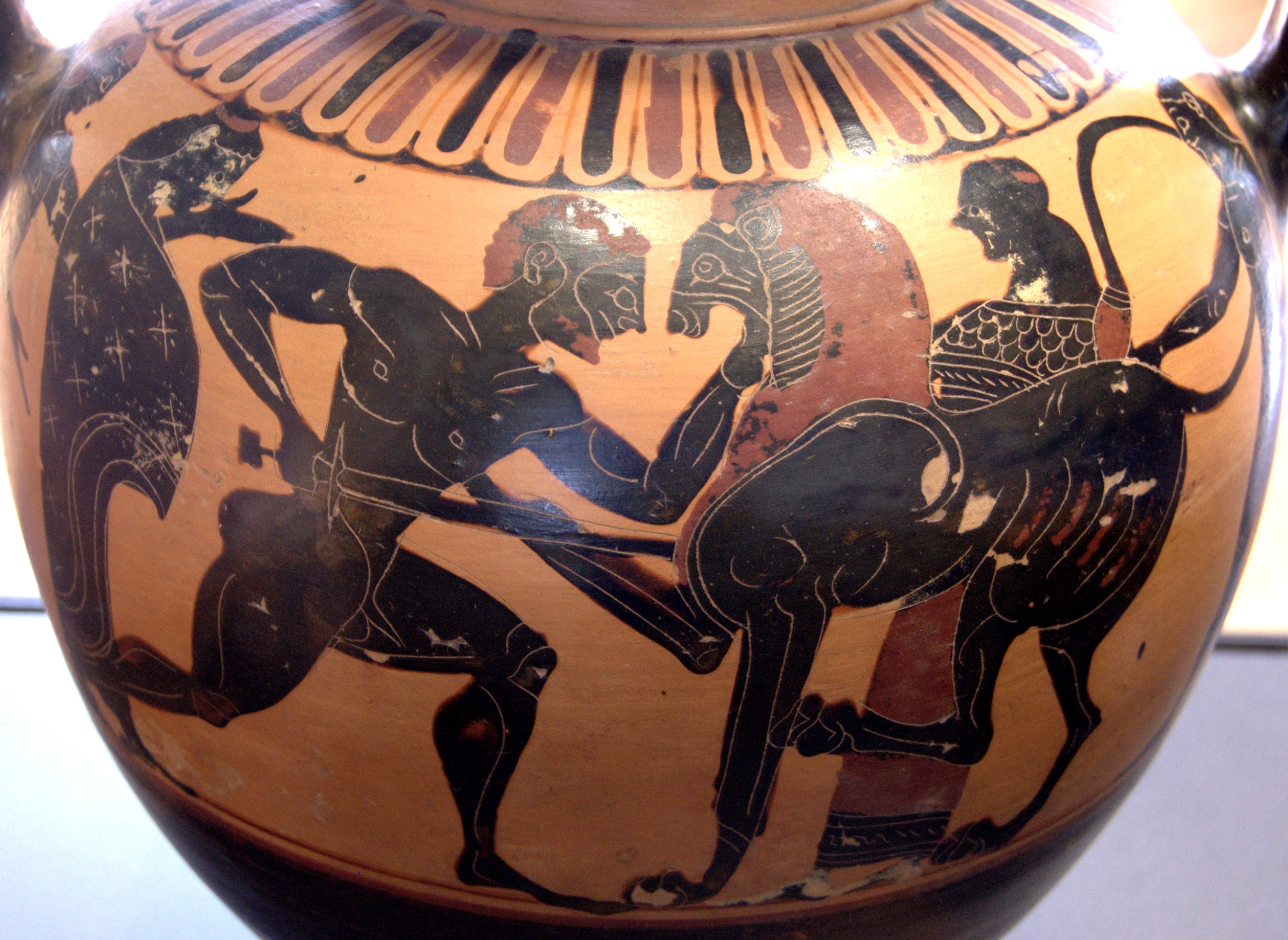
Herakles killing the Nemean Lion, front of a neck amphora by the Polyphemus Group, circa 560/540 BC. Paris: Louvre.

Pseudo-Chalcidian vase painting is an important style of black-figure Greek vase painting, dating to the 6th century BC.

Pseudo-Chalcidian vase painting was strongly influenced by Chalcidian vase painting, but also shows influences from Attic and Corinthian vase painting. The potters used the Ionic alphabet (and not the Chalcidian one) for added inscriptions. The clays were of a different fabric from those used for Chalcidian pottery. By now, about 60 vases of the style are known (they were compiled for the first time by Andreas Rumpf). The potters/painters may have been the successors of those who produced Chalcidian pottery, as well as some potters newly immigrated to Etruria.

Pseudo-Chalcidian vase painting can be subdivided in two groups. The older of the two is the Polyphemus Group. It produced the majority of known vases, mainly neck amphorae and oinochoai. Most show groups of animals, mythological imagery is rare (Herakles, Hephaistos). The vessels were found in Etruria and Sicily, but also in Marseille and Vix. The more recent and less productive memnon Group, to which 12 vessels can be ascribed, had a much less extensive distribution, limited exclusively to Etruria and Sicily. Apart from a single small oinochoe, it only produced neck amphorae, usually painted with animals and horsemen. There is a single depiction of a chariot race, as well as one amphora with Odysseus and Circe.

== Bibliography ==
- Robert Manuel Cook, Greek Painted Pottery, London ; New York, Routledge, 1997, ISBN 978-0-415-13859-8
- F. Canciani, Calcidesi, vasi, in Enciclopedia dell'arte antica classica e orientale (Secondo supplemento), Roma, Istituto della enciclopedia italiana, 1994.
- F. Canciani, "Eine neue Amphora aus Vulci und das Problem der pseudochalkidischen Vasen", in JDI 95, 1980, pp. 140-162
- M.Iozzo, Ceramica «calcidese». Nuovi documenti e problemi riproposti, “Atti e Memorie della Società Magna Grecia” S. III, vol. II (1993), Roma 1994 (in particolare Capitolo III)
- M.Iozzo, Catalogo dei vasi «calcidesi» del Museo Archeologico Nazionale di Firenze, Pontedera 1996
- M. Denoyelle-M. Iozzo, La céramique grecque d'Italie méridionale et de Sicile, Paris 2009
- M. Iozzo, “La ceramica «calcidese». Temperie artistica e produzione artigianale a Rhegion in età arcaica”, in E. Lippolis (ed.), I Greci in Occidente. Arte e artigianato in Magna Grecia, Catalogo Mostra Taranto 1996, pp. 313-321
- M.Iozzo, “Articolazione e struttura dell'officina «calcidese»: un tentativo di analisi attraverso l'esame stilistico”, in Céramique et peinture grecques: modes d'emploi, Rencontres de l'École du Louvre 26-28.4.1995, Paris 1999, pp. 289-303
- M. Iozzo, “Un'anfora a New York: osservazioni sui vasi “calcidesi” e “pseudocalcidesi”, in Mediterranea VII, 2010, pp. 169-183
- M. Iozzo, “Un eccezionale erotikon «calcidese»: Ninfe e Sileni nell’ebbrezza dionisiaca, in Ocnus 28, 2020, pp. 35-53
