= Canthus (disambiguation) =

The canthus is either corner of the eye where the upper and lower eyelids meet.

Canthus may also refer to:

- Canthus of the eye, also called the orbital canthus
- Canthus (herpetology), the sides of the snout in reptiles in amphibians
- Canthus (mythology), one of the Argonauts
- Canthus (crater), a geographical feature on Phoebe
