= Chalcidianising cup =

Type of ancient Greek pottery

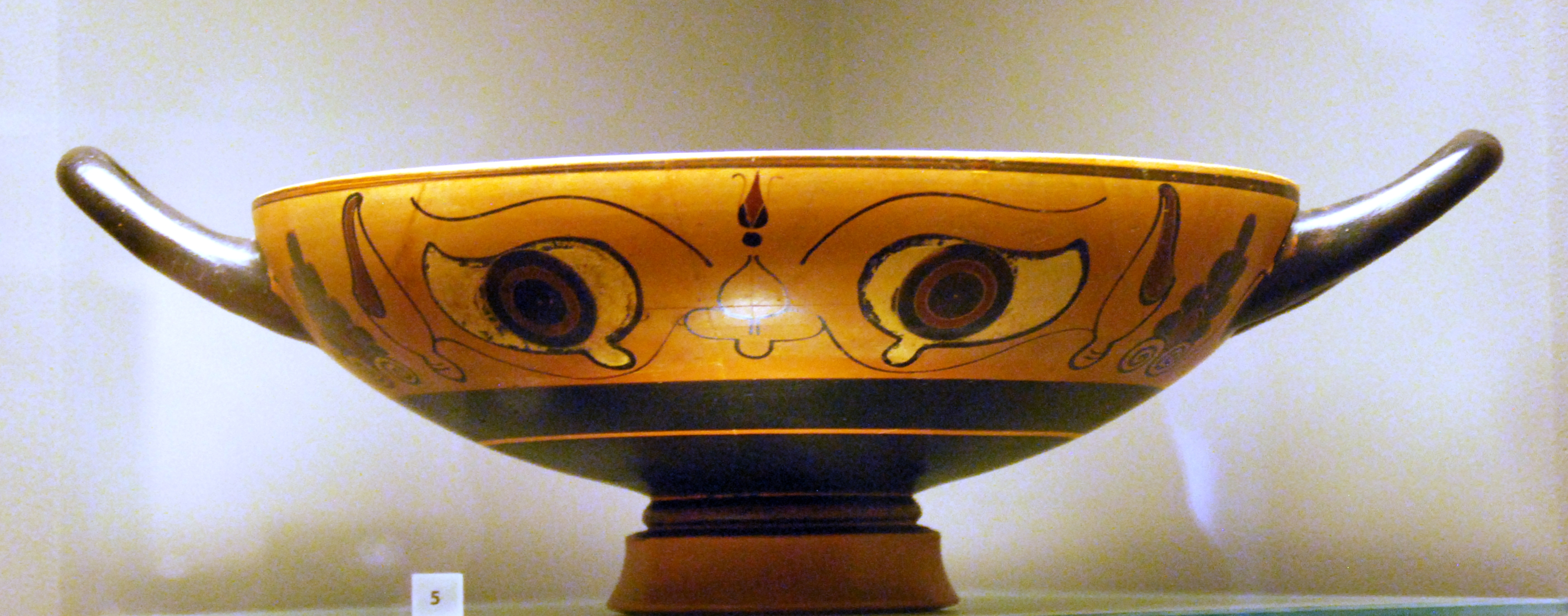
Chalcidianising cup

Chalcidianising cups are specific type of Attic eye-cups.

Chalcidianising cups were probably produced in the important workshop of the potter Nikosthenes and his successor Pamphaios, as can be deduced from at least two signed specimens made in that workshop. This cup type has a low but heavy foot with a concave edge. It is apparently influenced by a cup type invented by the producers of Chalkidian pottery in Southern Italy. Chalcidianising cups are one of several examples of Attic potters adopting South Italian vase shapes, so as to be able to accommodate South Italian tastes and retain Attic dominance over that market. Their decoration also follows South Italian tastes, including the addition of noses between the eyes, and of (satyr) ears on the rim. Except a single example that may have been discovered in Athens, all known Chalcidianising cups have been found in Southern Italy. They were produced around 530 BC.

== Bibliography ==
- John Boardman: Schwarzfigurige Vasen aus Athen. Ein Handbuch, Mainz 1977, ISBN 3-8053-0233-9, p. 117f.
