= Jerma =

Jerma may refer to:

- Jerma (river), a river of Serbia and Bulgaria
- Jerma people, an ethnic group of Niger and neighbouring countries
- Jerma language, a language of West Africa
- Jerma (Libya), an archaeological site in Libya
- Jerma985 (born 1985), American livestreamer and voice actor
- Jerma Palace Hotel, an abandoned hotel in Malta

== See also ==
- Yerma (disambiguation)
- Germa (disambiguation)
- Djerma (disambiguation)
- Jarma (disambiguation)
