= Pallas (daughter of Triton) =

Mythical Greek deity, daughter of Triton

In Greek mythology, Pallas (/ˈpæləs/; Ancient Greek: Παλλάς, romanized: Pallás) was a warrior and childhood friend of the goddess Athena.

== Mythology ==
Pallas was the daughter of Triton, a son of Poseidon and the messenger of the seas. After Athena was born fully armed from Zeus' forehead, Triton became foster parent to the goddess and raised her alongside Pallas. After he taught both girls the arts of war, the two became very close friends.

During an athletics festival, Pallas and Athena fought with spears in a friendly mock battle in which the victor would be whoever managed to disarm her opponent. At the beginning of the fight, Athena got the upper hand, until Pallas took over. Before she could win, Zeus, who was in attendance, fearing to see his own daughter lose, distracted Pallas with the Aegis, which she had once shown interest in. Pallas, stunned in awe, stood still as Athena, expecting her to dodge, fatally impaled her accidentally.

Out of sadness and regret, Athena created the palladium, a statue in the likeness of Pallas, and wrapped the aegis, which she had feared, about the breast of it, and set it up beside Zeus and honored it. Later, Athena took on the title Pallas as tribute to her late friend.

According to Herodotus, this story about Athena and Pallas appears to have given rise to an annual festival in ancient Libya that was dedicated to the goddess. A passage in his work describes this custom:

Next to these Machlyes are the Auseans; these and the Machlyes, separated by the Triton, live on the shores of the Tritonian lake. The Machlyes wear their hair long behind, the Auseans in front.

They celebrate a yearly festival of Athena, where their maidens are separated into two bands and fight each other with stones and sticks, thus (they say) honoring in the way of their ancestors that native goddess whom we call Athena. Maidens who die of their wounds are called false virgins.

Before the girls are set fighting, the whole people choose the fairest maid, and arm her with a Corinthian helmet and Greek panoply, to be then mounted on a chariot and drawn all along the lake shore.

With what armor they equipped their maidens before Greeks came to live near them, I cannot say; but I suppose the armor was Egyptian; for I maintain that the Greeks took their shield and helmet from Egypt.
