= Djerma =

Djerma may refer to:

- Djerma people, an ethnic group of Niger and neighbouring countries
- Djerma language, a Songhai language of West Africa
- Djerma, Algeria, a town in Algeria
- Djerma (Libya), an archaeological site in Libya
- Djerma (horse), a horse breed

== See also ==
- Jerma (disambiguation)
- Germa (disambiguation)
