= Chalcidian pottery =

Style of Greek black-figure vase painting

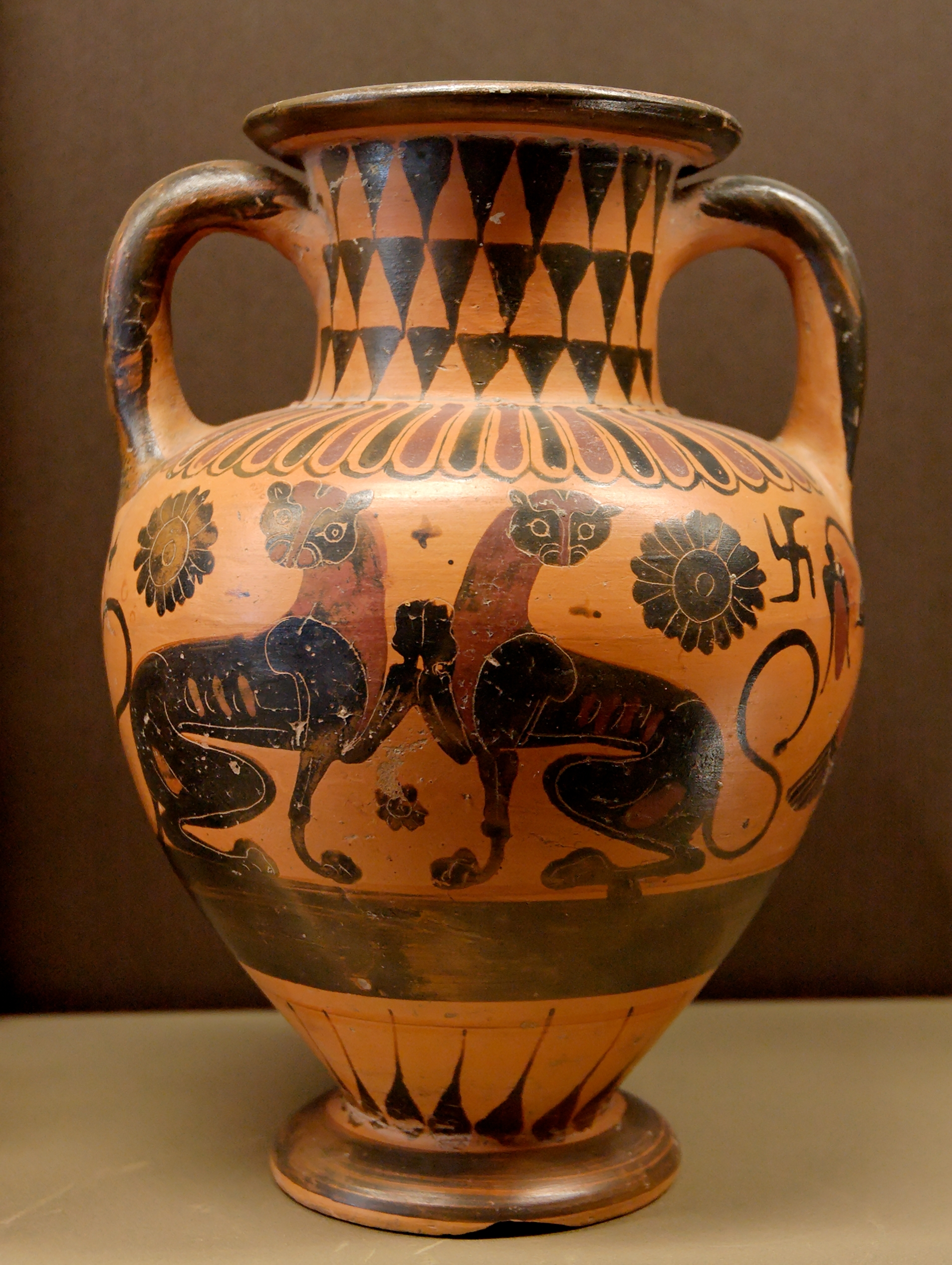
Animal on the back of a neck amphora by the Group of the Phineus Cup, c. 530 BC. Paris: Louvre.

Chalcidian pottery is a style of Western Greek black-figure vase painting.

The style's name is derived from the occasional presence of mythological inscriptions on the vases, which are executed in the Chalcidian alphabet. Andreas Rumpf and Adolf Kirchhoff, who coined the term, as well as other archaeologists initially assumed the pottery to originate from Euboea. Nowadays, it is believed to have been produced in Rhegion. The question has not yet been conclusively resolved. An argument against a South Italian origin is the fact that some vases bear trade marks not otherwise used in that part of Magna Graecia. The Chalkidian alphabet was not only used in Chalkis, but also elsewhere in Euboea and in Etruria. The possibility of an Etrurian origin is contradicted by the fact that Etruscan pottery was not usually exported to the South of Italy. The painting style has no recognisable Euboean characteristics and is thus unlikely to originate from there. Chalcidian vase painting shows influences from Attic, Corinthian and Ionian vase painting. The vases were found mainly in Italian sites such as Caere, Vulci and Rhegion, but also in Empúries (Spain), İzmir, Marseille. The style includes Pseudo-Chalkidian vase painting.

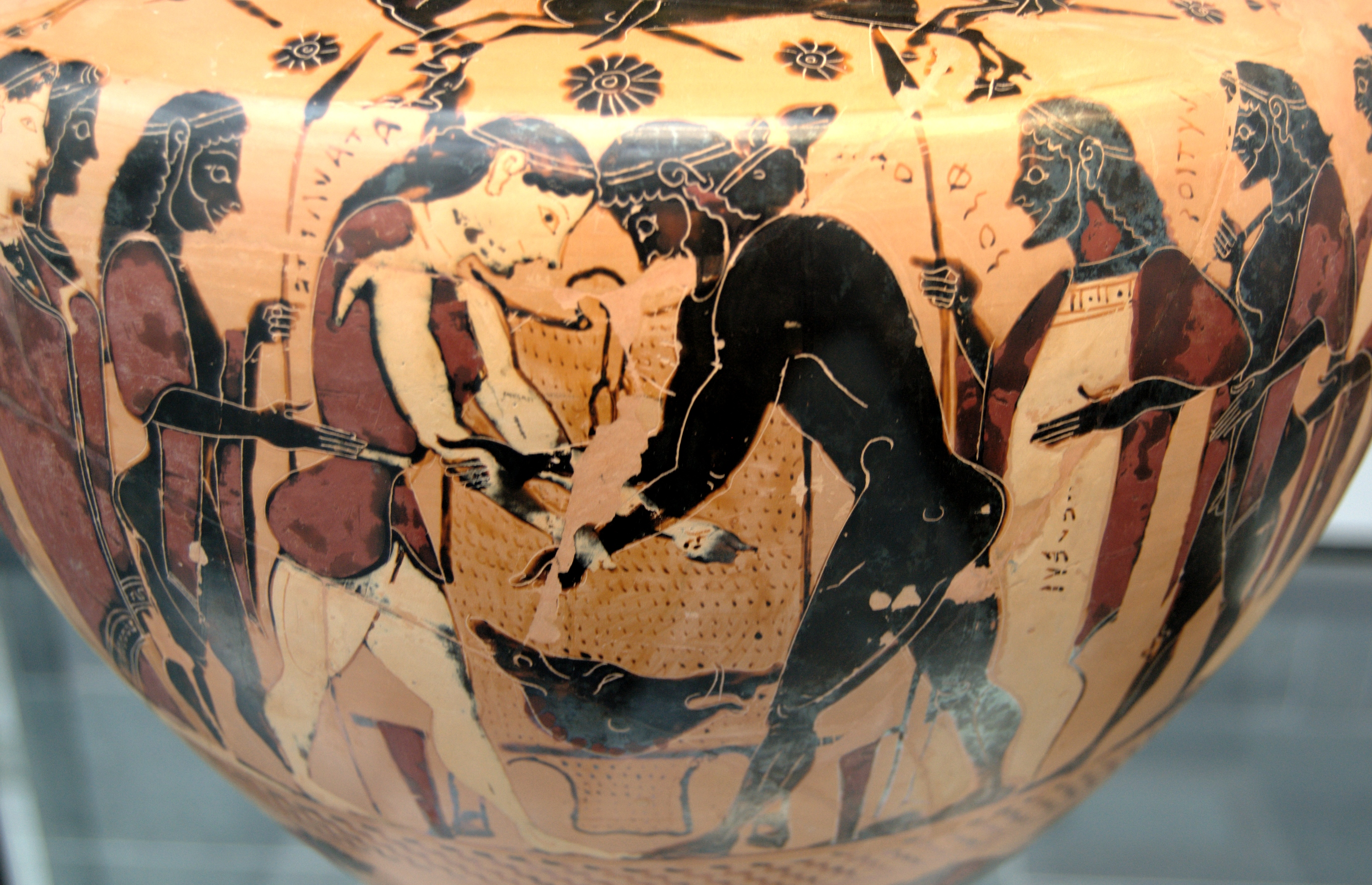
Peleus and Atalanta wrestling at the funeral games of king Pelias; hydria by the Inscription Painter, c. 550 BC. Munich: Staatliche Antikensammlungen.

The production of Chalcidian vases started suddenly around 560 BC. No predecessors have been recognised so far. It ended after about 50 years, around 510 BC. Today, about 600 vases are known; 15 painters or groups of painters can be recognised. Key characteristic of the vases the high quality of the pottery. The shiny slip that usually covers turned deep black after firing. The base clay was orange. Their painters made generous use of red and white paints, as well as incision for internal detail. The leading shape is the neck amphora, providing about a quarter of all known Chalcidian vases, followed by eye-cups, oinochoai and hydriai; rarer shapes include kraters, skyphoi and pyxides. Lekanes and Etruscan-style cups occur exceptionally. The construction of the vases is straightforward and simple. A typical feature is the Chalcidian cup foot, sometimes imitated in Attic black-figure and (rarely) red-figure vases.

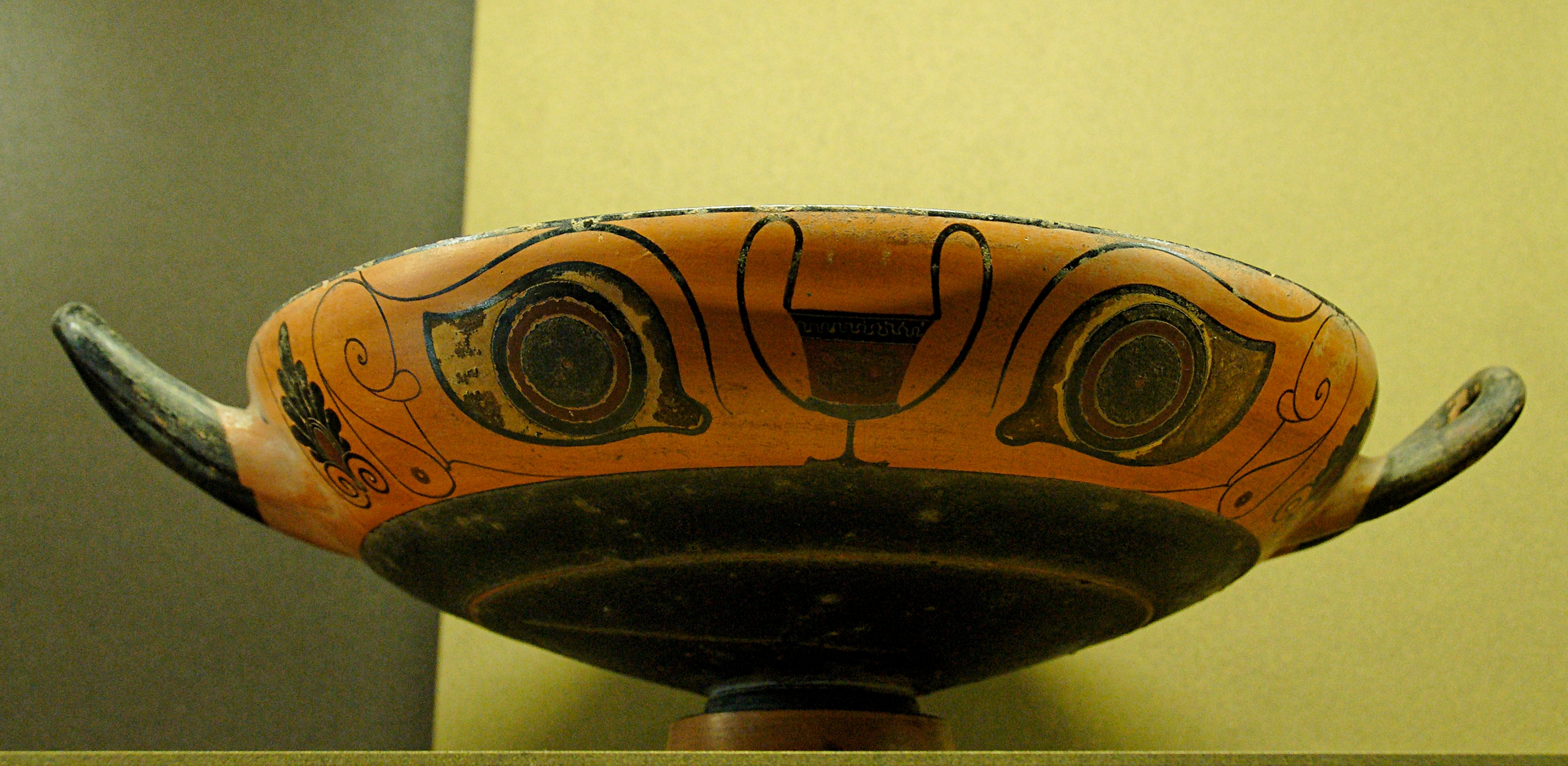
Eye-cup by the Group of the Phineus Cup, c. 530 BC Paris: Louvre.

The most important among the recognised artists of the older generation is the Inscription Painter, among the later ones the Phineus Painter. The Inscription Painter had probably invented the style, whereas the Phineus Painter ran one of the most productive workshops, responsible for at least 170 of the known pieces. He may also have been the last representative of the style. The images are usually decorative, rather than narrative, in character. Horsemen, animal friezes, heraldic images or groups of humans occur. A large lotus-palmette cross is also often included. Mythological imagery is rare, but of outstanding quality when it occurs. Only 30 vases with mythological motifs are known. They depict the deeds of Herakles, scenes from the Trojan War, or the voyage of the Argo. Depictions of gods are rare, limited to two images of the return of Hephaistos to Mount Olympus. More common are nymphs, silenus or running gorgons. The figures appear elastic and lively. The most common ornaments are chains of buds and rosettes.

== Bibliography ==
- A. Rumpf, Chalkidische Vasen, Berlin – Leipzig 1927
- L. Banti, Calcidesi, vasi in Enciclopedia dell'arte antica classica e orientale, vol. 2, Rome, Istituto della enciclopedia italiana, 1959.
- M. Iozzo, "Ceramica «calcidese» inedita da Reggio Calabria", in Xenia 6, 1983, pp. 3-24
- F. Canciani, Calcidesi, vasi in Enciclopedia dell'arte antica classica e orientale (Secondo supplemento), Rome, Istituto della enciclopedia italiana, 1994.
- M. Iozzo, Ceramica «calcidese». Nuovi documenti e problemi riproposti, "Atti e Memorie della Società Magna Grecia" S. III, vol. II (1993), Rome 1994
- M. Iozzo, Catalogo dei vasi «calcidesi» del Museo Archeologico Nazionale di Firenze, Pontedera 1996
- M. Denoyelle-M. Iozzo, La céramique grecque d'Italie méridionale et de Sicile, Paris 2009
- M. Iozzo, "Ceramica «calcidese» inedita da Reggio Calabria", in Xenia 6, 1983, pp. 3–24
- M. Iozzo, "Un'anfora del Pittore di Phineus", in Xenia 11, 1986, pp. 5–18
- M. Iozzo, "A «Chalcidian» Cup Restored: a Rectification", in Xenia 18, 1989, pp. 5–8
- M. Iozzo, "La ceramica «calcidese». Temperie artistica e produzione artigianale a Rhegion in età arcaica", in E. Lippolis (ed.), I Greci in Occidente. Arte e artigianato in Magna Grecia, Catalogo Mostra Taranto 1996, pp. 313–321
- M. Iozzo, "Articolazione e struttura dell'officina «calcidese»: un tentativo di analisi attraverso l'esame stilistico", in Céramique et peinture grecques: modes d'emploi, Rencontres de l'École du Louvre 26-28.4.1995, Paris 1999, pp. 289-303
- M. Iozzo, "Novità calcidesi", in A. J. Clark-J. Gaunt (edd.), Essays in Honor of Dietrich von Bothmer, «Allard Pierson Series» 14, Amsterdam 2002, pp. 147-151
- M. Iozzo, "Un'anfora a New York: osservazioni sui vasi "calcidesi" e "pseudocalcidesi"", in Mediterranea VII, 2010, pp. 169–183
- M. Iozzo, "Un coperchio «calcidese» riguadagnato e il duello fra xiphephoroi e doryphoroi", in ASAtene 98, 2020, pp. 50–55
