= Yerma (disambiguation) =

Yerma is a 1934 play by García Lorca

Yerma may also refer to:

- Yerma (1984 film)
- Yerma (1998 film)
- Yerma (opera)

== See also ==
- Jerma (disambiguation)
