= Lake Tritonis =

Lake in North Africa

- Location: Ancient Libya (North Africa)
- Type: Ancient freshwater lake
- Basin countries: Tunisia
- Islands: Phla, Mene
- References: Herodotus; Diodorus Siculus; Periplus of Pseudo-Scylax

Lake Tritonis (Ancient Greek: Τριτωνίς λίμνη, romanized: Tritōnis limnē) was a large body of fresh water in North Africa or that was described in many ancient texts. Classical-era Greek writers placed the lake in Ancient Libya. In details of the late myths and personal observations related by these historians, the lake was said to be named after Triton. The element trit may be a Pre-Greek word for the sea, as seen in the names of Amphitrite and Triton.

According to Herodotus, it contained two islands, Phla, which the Lacedaemonians were to have colonized, according to an oracle, and Mene.

== Location ==
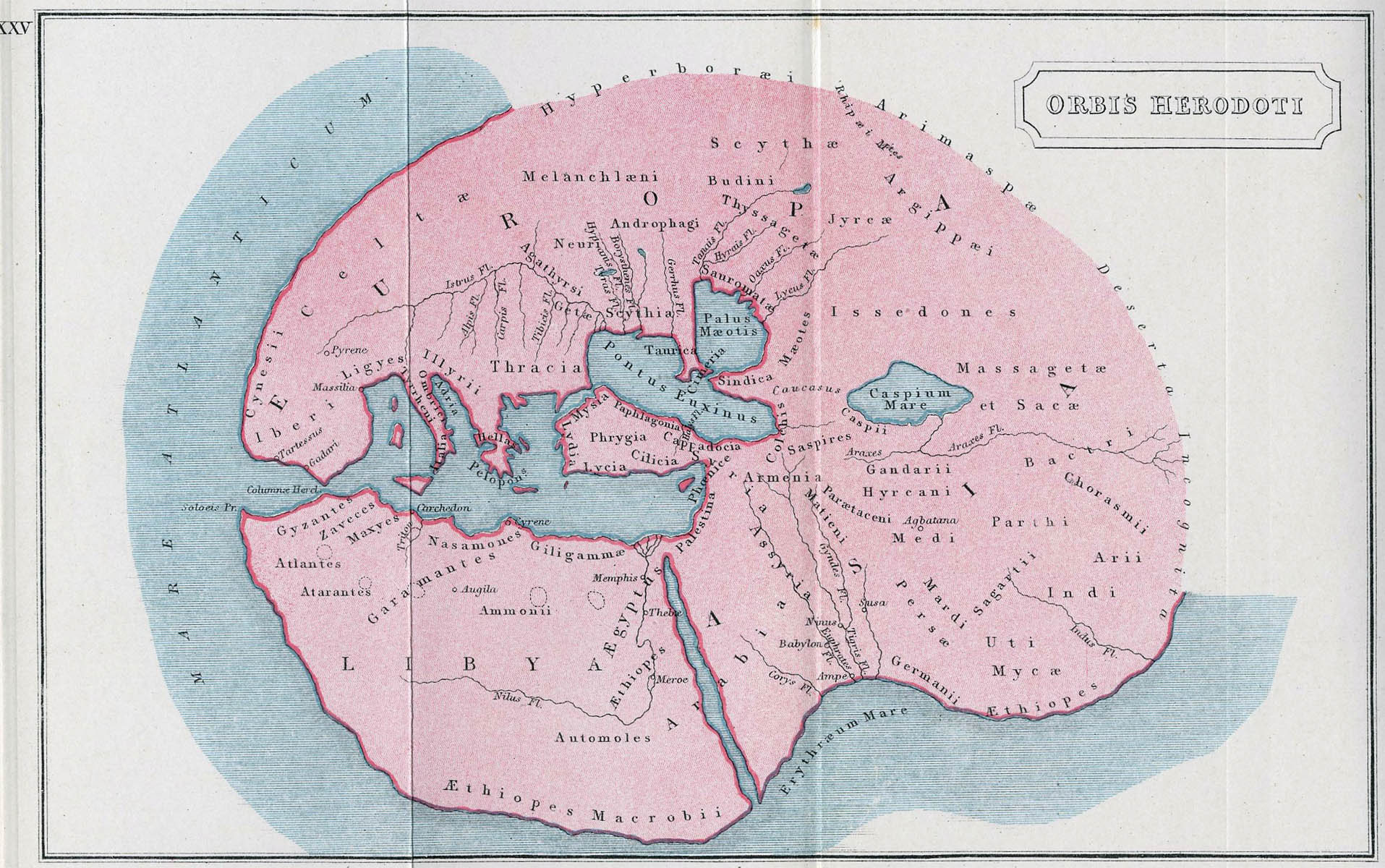
Map of the world based on Herodotus' Histories; Lake Tritonis (in red circle) is positioned south of Carthage, suggesting Boughrara.

The location is unclear. The lake is mentioned as being in Libya, a land the ancient Greeks believed encircled their world, "washed on all sides by the sea", Herodotus said, "except where it is attached to Asia". "In their knowledge, Libya extended from Ancient Egypt, the Nile Valley and its basin, Algeria and along the south of Ancient Egypt."

Both Herodotus in the fifth century B.C. and Diodorus in the first century A.D. described the lake. In the Periplus of Pseudo-Scylax, which is thought to date from the mid-4th century B.C., it is said to have a circumference of 1000 stadia, suggesting an area of about 2,300 km^{2} (890 sq mi; 570,000 acres), similar to Lake Kivu. Herodotus assumed that there would have to be a large river flowing into it, which he called the Triton.

Modern scholars have connected Tritonis to the lagoon of the Gulf of Boughrara, which feeds into the Gulf of Gabès in modern Tunisia, or to the Golfo di Cagliari in Sardinia.

== History ==
The name of the lake appears in discussion of the geography related in Greek mythology.

When Athena is addressed as Athena Tritogeneia ("born of Trito"), the archaic epithet is explained by the episode where, having sprung fully formed from the head—or thigh—of Zeus—who had swallowed her pregnant mother Metis to prevent his own downfall from the rule over the current Greek pantheon by her progeny, as predicted and later spat her out after Athena's birth—the goddess was escorted to Lake Tritonis and attended to by the nymphs of that lake. A different interpretation, taking into consideration much earlier Greek and Minoan myths, leads translator Robert Graves to suggest that the reverse direction of religious influence occurred, with Neith being the deity who influenced development of the Greek concept for the goddess Athena. Neith was an ancient deity when first appearing in the earliest Egyptian pantheon.

The story of the Argonauts places Triton's home on the Mediterranean coast of Libya. Before the epic Argonautica of Apollonius, Herodotus knew this tradition of Jason, in which winds:

"Carried him out of his course to the coast of Libya; where, before he discovered the land, he got among the shallows of Lake Tritonis. As he was turning it in his mind how he should find his way out, Triton (they say) appeared to him, and offered to show him the channel, and secure him a safe retreat, if he would give him the tripod. Jason complying, was shown by Triton the passage through the shallows; after which the god took the tripod, and, carrying it to his own temple, seated himself upon it, and, filled with prophetic fury, delivered to Jason and his companions a long prediction. "When a descendant", he said, "of one of the Argo's crew should seize and carry off the brazen tripod, then by inevitable fate would a hundred Grecian cities be built around Lake Tritonis". The Libyans of that region, when they heard the words of this prophecy, took away the tripod and hid it."

As Apollonius of Rhodes narrates it, when the Argo was driven ashore on the Lesser Syrtes by a fierce storm while returning from Colchis, the Argonauts found themselves in "an area surrounded by sands". They portaged their ship twelve days to Lake Tritonis, but the lake water was salty and undrinkable. Since they could find no outlet from Lake Tritonis to the sea, they could do nothing. Then they propitiated the deities with a golden tripod on the shore and Triton, the local deity, appeared to them in the form of a youthful man, to show them a hidden channel to the sea.

This late myth related that a lake nymph named Tritonis made the lake her home and, according to an ancient tradition, was the mother of Athena by Poseidon. (Herodotus, iv. 180; Pindar. Pytli. iv. 20.) By Amphithemis, she became the mother of Nasamon and Cephalion.

== Sources ==
- A support for the existence of paleolakes and paleorivers buried under Saharan sand by means of Bgravitational signal from EIGEN 6C4
- Dictionary of Greek and Roman Biography and Mythology, p. 1175
- Mapping Argo (archived)
- Cyrene
- Libya
- Amazon.com: Phrase: "Lake Tritonis"
- Southern Tunisia - research campaign 2005
- Chott El Djerd: A dry salt lake
- Liddell-Scott-Jones Lexicon of Classical Greek
- Geology of Wessex Coast
- Chapter 28
- Chapter 27
