= Pompholyge =

Mother in Greek mythology

In Greek mythology, Pompholyge (Ancient Greek: Πομφολύγη, romanized: Pompholúgē) was the mother of Asia and Libye by Oceanus, the Titan god of the sea. Asia is often counted as one of the Oceanids, so Pompholyge might be a different name for Tethys, often depicted as the mother of these ocean deities.
