= Gnaeus Suellius Flaccus =

Gnaeus Suellius Flaccus was a Roman Praetor of Creta et Cyrenaica. He is known for defeating the Nasamones, a nomadic Berber tribe that rose against Roman rule.

== Career ==
Responding to alleged acts of extortion, the Nasamones resisted Roman rule in Cyrenaica around 85 AD. They began raiding in the region, marauding the coastal settlements in eastern Libya. Flaccus was sent in by the emperor Domitian to deal with the threat. Flaccus was initially unsuccessful; his army was defeated and the tax collectors accompanying him were killed. However, when the raiders began looting Flaccus' camp, they discovered copious amounts of wine as well as other provisions. They drank the wine, feasted on the provisions, and fell asleep in the camp. Shortly thereafter, Flaccus returned with his army and massacred the sleeping tribesmen. Domitian was thrilled with his success, proclaiming: "I have forbidden the Nasamones to exist."
