= Jarma, Pakistan =

Jarma
- Union Council
- Location in Khyber Pakhtunkhwa
- Coordinates: 33.4856°N 71.3385°E
- Country: Pakistan
- Province: Khyber Pakhtunkhwa
- District: Kohat
- Time zone: UTC+5 (PST)

Jarma (Urdu: جرما) is an administrative unit known as union council of Kohat District in the Khyber Pakhtunkhwa province of Pakistan.

District Kohat has 2 Tehsils: Kohat and Lachi. Each Tehsil comprises certain number of union councils. There are 32 union councils in district Kohat.
