= Cephalion (mythology) =

Son of Amphithemis in Greek mythology

In Greek mythology, Cephalion (Ancient Greek: Κεφαλίων), also called Caphaurus (Κάφαυρον), was the son of Amphithemis/Garamas and the nymph Tritonis and the brother of Nasamon, this marks his direct descendance from the sun god Apollo and Libya.

== Etymology ==
Caphaurus, also known as Cephalion, Caphaura means 'camphor', and presumably this was meant to indicate his somewhat exotic African origin

== Mythology ==
Cephalion's family lived in Libya and he was a shepherd of whose flocks were plundered by the Argonauts Canthus and Eurybates (Eribotes). These two were later killed by Cephalion in revenge. Then Cephalion was murdered by the hands of the tribal chiefs of the argaunots, whom had buried his body in earth and took his flock.

== More bibliography ==
- Apollonius Rhodius, Argonautica translated by Robert Cooper Seaton (1853-1915), R. C. Loeb Classical Library Volume 001. London, William Heinemann Ltd, 1912. Online version at the Topos Text Project.
- Apollonius Rhodius, Argonautica. George W. Mooney. London. Longmans, Green. 1912. Greek text available at the Perseus Digital Library.
- Hyginus, Fabulae from The Myths of Hyginus translated and edited by Mary Grant. University of Kansas Publications in Humanistic Studies. Online version at the Topos Text Project.
