= Teleon =

In Greek mythology, Teleon (Ancient Greek: Τελέων, gen. Τελέοντος) may refer to the following two distinct characters:

- Teleon, also called Geleon (Γελέων), the Athenian son of Ion, eponym of the Ionians, and brother of Aegicoreus, Argades and Hoples. The earlier four tribes of Athens: Teleontes (Teleonites)/ Geleontes, Aegicoreis, Argadeis (Ergadeis) and Hopletes (Hoplites) were named after him and his siblings. Later on, Teleon fathered Butes, one of the Argonauts, by his naiad-wife Zeuxippe, daughter of the river god Eridanos.
- Teleon, the Locrian father of Eribotes, another Argonaut. Apollonius describes Teleon as "virtuous" (ἀγαθός), but beyond that, no information on this figure is available.
