= Germa (disambiguation) =

Germa is an ancient town now in Libya.

Germa may also refer to:

- Germa (Galatia), a town of ancient Galatia, now in Turkey
- Germa (Mysia), a town of ancient Mysia, now in Turkey
- Germa 66, a pirate group in One Piece.

== See also ==
- Jerma (disambiguation)
