= Nasamones =

Ancient Libyan Tribe

The Nasamones (Ancient Greek: Νασαμῶνες) mentioned by Herodotus (c. 484–425 BCE) were a Libyan tribe inhabiting the coastal region of the Gulf of Sirte and traveling inland to the oasis of Augila where men lived around a spring of water and migrated at fixed seasons each year. During the summer, they left their flocks by the sea and journeyed to Augila to gather dates from the palm trees where they grew in great abundance. They also hunted locusts, which they dried in the sun, ground into powder, and sprinkled into milk to drink. They were one of the Native libyan peoples.

== History ==
They took their name from Nasamon (Νασάμων), the son of Amphithemis and the nymph Tritonis. They practiced polygamy. However, according to W. F. G. Lacroix, the Nasamones were sheep herders. Ptolemy later located them around Samah, a town between Zillah and Awjilah in Libya, and Lacroix suggested that their name derived from this place, as Na-Samah-nes. Pliny the Elder recorded the name Nasamones, explaining that it derived from a term meaning "in the middle of the sands".

According to Lacroix, the Nasamones were shepherds wandering about between the south-eastern coast of the Gulf of Sirte in the north, Zillah in the west, and Awilah in the east. There is no explicit mention that the Nasamones used war chariots drawn by four horses; however, according to Herodotus, the Hellenes (Greeks) learned the use of chariots from the Libyans, suggesting that the Nasamones may have also employed such vehicles. Moreover, archaeological and historical sources suggest that Libyan chariots—apart from those used by the Garamantes—appear to have been of primitive simplicity, showing little improvement in design or function compared to those of neighboring civilizations. They were known to attack and be defeated and killed by the Greek colonies in Cyrenaica. During the Peloponnesian War, the citizens of Euesperides received aid from the Spartan general Gylippus, who helped defend the town and defended it by defeating and killing the Nasomones from the Nasamone attack on his way to Sicily. Later, Pliny the Elder recounts that the Nasamones defeated the Psylli tribe in war, expelling them from the area and they lived with them in the same area later. They had been known to attack and burn ships although on a small scale.

The Roman emperor Augustus worked to pacify the Cyrenaican tribes and sent proconsul Publius Sulpicius Quirinus to govern Creta et Cyrenaica in 15 BCE and the Romans ruled the Nasamones. The Nasamones were ruled over by the Romans and remained autonomous in the Roman Empire. According to Cassius Dio, they rose up a century later in 85 CE when the Romans tried to extort money from them. They began trying to raid the coastal settlements again until they were pushed back to the interior by Gnaeus Suellius Flaccus and his forces when they defeated and killed them.

Later during Late Antiquity and the Early Middle Ages, the Nasamones became vassals of the Eastern Roman Empire. Procopius writes that the Nasamones remained pagan even after the 6th century when the emperor Justinian built a church for the Byzantines in Awjila.

It is unknown what became of the Nasamones after that period.

== See also ==
- Awjila
- Cyrenaica
- Garamantes
