= Amphithemis =

Multiple figures from Greek mythology

In Greek mythology, Amphithemis (Ancient Greek: Ἀμφίθεμις), was the name of the following figures:

- Amphithemis, son of Acacallis (the daughter of Minos) and Apollo. He was born in Libya, to which Minos had banished Acacallis in retribution for her having an illicit relationship. By the Libyan lake nymph Tritonis, he fathered two sons: Nasamon and Caphaurus (also known as Cephalion). The latter was a shepherd who slew the Argonauts Eurybate and Canthus after they plundered his flocks. According to Apollonius of Rhodes, Amphithemis was also named Garamas (the eponym of the Garamantes).
- In the Dionysiaca of Nonnus (5th century AD), Amphithemis is a centaur.
