= Andreas Rumpf =

German classical archaeologist (1890-1966)

Andreas Rumpf (3 December 1890 – 22 June 1966) was a German classical archaeologist born in Potsdam. He was a specialist of ancient Greek and Roman art, in particular, vase painting and Greek wall painting. He was the son of painter Fritz Rumpf (1856–1927).

He studied classical archaeology at the University of Leipzig under Franz Studniczka (1860-1929), earning his doctorate with a dissertation on the murals in Veii, titled "Die Wandmalereien in Veji." In 1923 he received his habilitation at Leipzig with a thesis on Chalkidiki vases. From 1928 to 1960 he was a professor of classical archaeology at the University of Cologne.

He was editor of the "Griechische und römische Kunst" (1932, part of the Einleitung in der Altertumswissenschaft series).

== Selected publications ==
- Chalkidische Vasen (Chalkidiki vases) (Berlin 1927).
- Katalog der etruskischen Skulpturen (Catalog of Etruscan sculptures) (1928).
- Antike Sarkophagreliefs: die Meerwesen (1939).
- Malerei und Zeichnung der klassischen Antike (Paintings and drawings of classical antiquity), "Handbuch der Archäologie" IV 1 (Munich 1953).
- Archäologie. 1 Einleitung. Historischer Überblick (Archaeology, 1. Introduction, historical overview), two volumes (Berlin 1953).
- Archäologie. 2 Die Archäologensprache. Die antiken Reproduktionen (Archaeology, 2. The archaeologists' language, the antique reproductions) (Berlin 1956).
- Stilphasen der spätantiken Kunst (Köln 1957).
