= Canthus (mythology) =

Set of mythological Greek characters

In Greek mythology, the name Canthus (Ancient Greek: Κάνθος) may refer to:

- Canthus, one of the Argonauts, son of Canethus and grandson of Abas (alternately, son of Abas). He was killed by Caphaurus (or Cephalion), son of Amphithemis and Tritonis, in Libya. However, in some accounts, he was killed by Gesander during the Colchian war.
- Canthus, one of the sons of Aegyptus, who, according to Hyginus, married and was killed by Eurydice, daughter of Danaus.
