= Germa =

Germa جرمة
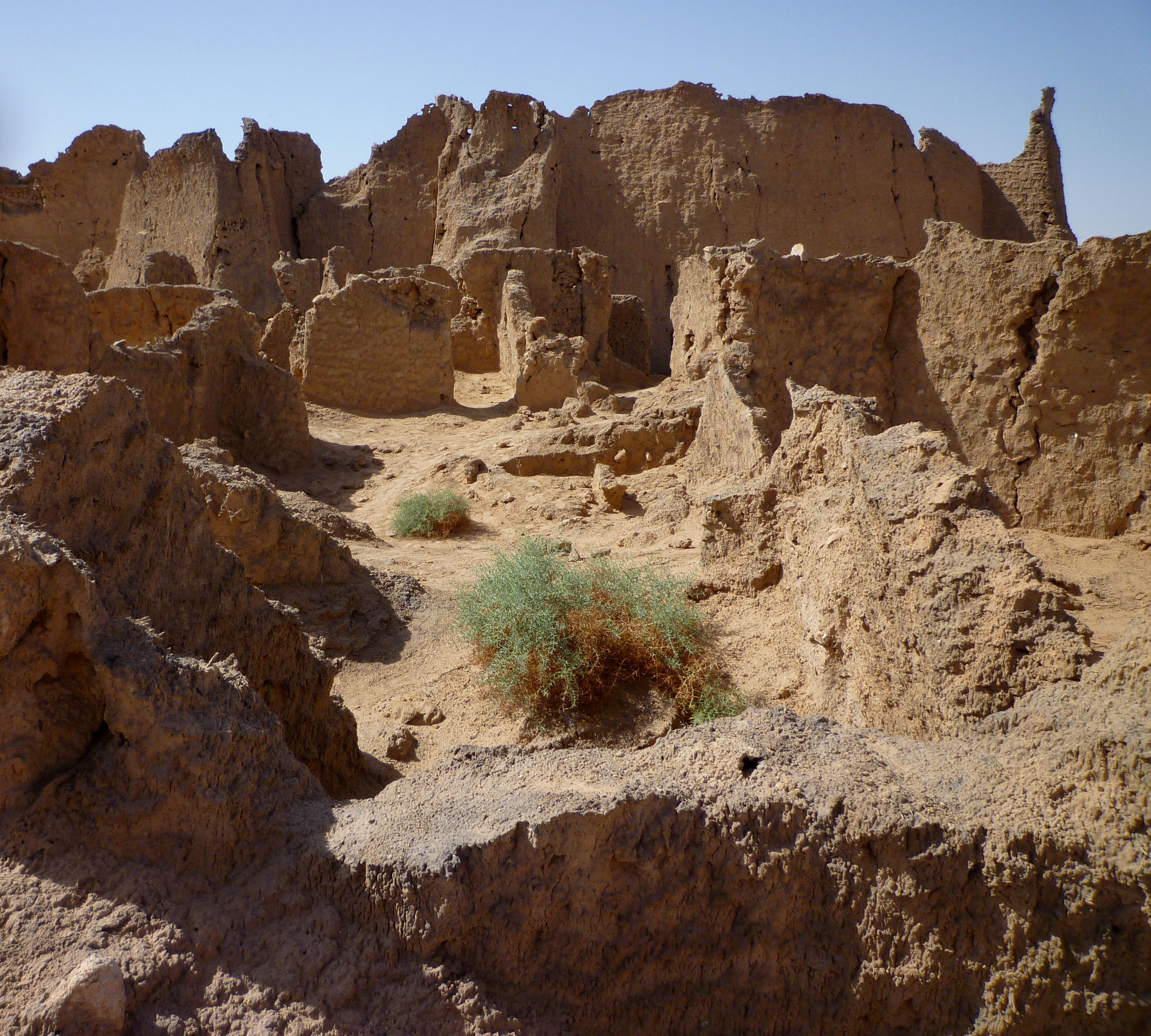
- Ruins of Germa

- Location in Libya
- Coordinates: 26.544°N 13.064°E
- Country: Libya
- Region: Fezzan
- District: Wadi al Hayaa

Population (2006)
  - Total: 4,839
- Time zone: UTC + 2

Germa, Jerma, Jarma, Djourma, Djerma, Djarma (Arabic: جرمة), known in ancient times as Garama, is an archaeological site in Libya. It was the capital of the Garamantian Kingdom.

== Etymology ==
Germa and the Garamantes tribe are named after their mythical founder Garamas.

== History ==
The Garamantes were a Saharan people living in the Fezzan in the northeastern Sahara Desert. Garamantian power climaxed during the second and the third centuries AD, often in conflict with the Roman Empire to the north. Garama had a population of some four thousand and another six thousand living in villages within a 5 km radius.

The Garamantes often conducted raids across Rome's African frontier, the Limes Tripolitanus, and retreated to the safety of the desert. In 203, Roman Emperor Septimius Severus launched a campaign deep into the Sahara and captured Garama, but he soon abandoned it.

While some sources assert that the city was conquered by Uqba ibn Nafi in 669 AD, other sources negate the claim that the city was conquered by Uqba ibn Nafi, suggesting instead that a peace treaty was concluded following a conflict between him and the Kanem Empire.

Archaeological work at Germa has most recently been conducted by Prof. David Mattingly's Fazzan Project, which has continued the work of Charles Daniels and Mohammed Ayoub. The Fazzan Project has published a volume based on its work, titled The Archaeology of Fazzan: Synthesis. A digital version of this book has been made freely available under a policy of open access by the British Institute for Libyan and Northern African Studies.

== See also ==
- Garamantes
- Tuareg
