= Garamantes =

Ancient North African population

Map of the Roman Empire under Hadrian (ruled 117 – 138 AD), showing the location of the Garamantes kingdom, in the desert regions south of the Roman province of Africa proconsularis (Tunisia, Libya).

The Garamantes (Ancient Greek: Γαράμαντες, romanized: Garámantes; Latin: Garamantes) were ancient peoples, who may have descended from Berber tribes, Toubou tribes, and Saharan pastoralists and who had settled, at least as early as 1000 BC, in the Fezzan region, where they established a civilization that flourished until its end in the late 7th century AD. The Garamantes first emerged as a major regional power in the mid-2nd century AD and established a kingdom that spanned roughly 180,000 km^{2} (70,000 sq mi) in the Fezzan region of southern Libya. Their growth and expansion was based on a complex and extensive qanat irrigation system (Berber: foggaras), which supported a strong agricultural economy and a large population. They subsequently developed the first urban society in a major desert that was not centered on a river system; their largest town, Garama, had a population of around four thousand, with an additional six thousand living in surrounding suburban areas. At its pinnacle, the Garamantian kingdom established and maintained a "standard of living far superior to that of any other ancient Saharan society" and was composed of "brilliant farmers, resourceful engineers, and enterprising merchants who produced a remarkable civilization."

== Origin and prehistory ==
The Garamantes may have descended from Libyco-Berber tribes, Toubou tribes, and Saharan pastoralists, who settled in an area of the Fezzan region at least 1000 BC. At Takarkori rockshelter, Final Pastoral peoples restructured their society and created burial sites for several hundred individuals that contained non-local, luxury goods and drum-type architecture in 3000 BP, which made way for the development of the Garamantian kingdom. Final Pastoral peoples were also in contact with the Garamantes, who later acquired a monopoly on the oasis-based economy of the southern region of Libya. People of the Tichitt culture in southeastern Mauritania may have also made domestic architectural and ceramic contributions to the Garamantian culture, possibly due to the presence of Sahelian women in Garamantian society as a result of intermarriage. From the 6th century BCE, the Garamantes formed a powerful polity in northern Libya, controlling the trade routes between the Niger Bend and the Mediterranean.

The Garamantes may have been involved in slave raids against the Tichitt culture, possibly using captives as labourers in the Fezzan. In the last millennium BCE, agropastoralists living in Dhar Tichitt in southeastern Mauritania were continuously raided by people, who archaeologists think to be “Lybico-Berbers” or the “Garamantes” coming from the north (Munson 1980, 459). Rock art across the Sahara until southern Mauritania is likely testimony to the Garamantes’ mobility throughout the region, some of which depicts a chariot of war chasing a man.(Gautier 1935; Mauny 1947) Although chariots could not be used in the desert, they could easily be dismantled and reassembled for raiding purposes in specific locations (Fentress 2011, 69). It is therefore possible that the Garamantes raided the Tichitt site in the mid last millennium BCE. In addition, further material and written evidence from across the Mediterranean corroborates the hypothesis that enslaved individuals from sub-Saharan Africa were sold to the Mediterranean world from the turn of the last millennium BCE, well before the expansion of the trade after the Muslim conquest of the Maghreb in the 7th century CE. Ostraca from Bu Djem, a Roman fort south of Lepcis along a major trans-Saharan route, document Garamantian traders and black slaves. A third-century inscription from coastal Hadrumetum preserves a vicious invective against both Garamantes and the black slaves that they brought.

Archaeological evidence, a lip plug found at one excavated tomb, suggests that the Garamantes had sub-Saharan African individuals in their cities in the Fezzan Basin (a region in today’s Libya), possibly as slaves (Fentress 2011, 69). The practice of stealing women from the south has also been attributed to the Garamantes, as well as to later populations such as the Tuareg and Tebu.

== History ==
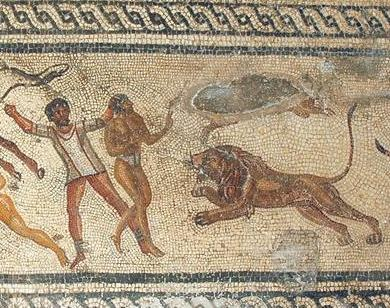
Portion from the Zliten mosaic found in the Villa of Dar Buc Ammera depicting the execution of Garamantian prisoners through damnatio ad bestias in the Amphitheatre of Leptis Magna, c. 70 CE.

The earliest known written record to document the Garamantes dates to the 5th century BC. Herodotus includes the Garamantes in his description of the ancient Libyan tribes, describing them as "a very great nation" who herded cattle and farmed dates. According to Herodotus the Garamantes used four-horse chariots to hunt "Troglodyte Ethiopians" in their quest for slaves. Herodotus states that "the Libyans in the north and the Ethiopians in the south of Libya are aboriginal, the Phoenicians and Greeks are later settlers”; Libya being the Greek name for Africa west of the Nile.

Besides Herodotus, historic references to the Garamantes also appear in several other Greco-Roman sources. After conducting a comprehensive review of quotes on the Garamantes from various sources, including Strabo, Arnobius Adv. Gentes, Ptolemy, and Solinus, David Mattingly et al. (2003) concluded:

Clearly, the perception of some of the Roman writers was that some Garamantians were negroid or very dark-skinned, whilst others saw them as essentially aligned with the Berber peoples. This mixed picture most likely reflects the ancient reality ... On the evidence of the sources alone, the likelihood is that the Garamantes encompassed a mixture of racial types: Berber, negro and various levels of miscegenation.

Roman depictions describe the Garamantes as bearing ritual scars and tattoos. Tacitus wrote that they assisted the rebel Tacfarinas and raided Roman coastal settlements. According to Pliny the Elder, in response to continuous Garamantian raiding, Lucius Cornelius Balbus and other Romans captured fifteen of their settlements in 19 BC. In 202 AD, Septimius Severus captured the capital city of Garama.

The Roman traveller Julius Maternus travelled with the king of the Garamantes during an expedition into inner Africa, reaching Agisymba after a journey of approximately four months from Garama.The Garamantian king is said to have claimed sovereignty over Agisymba and its inhabitants, presenting them as subject peoples during campaigns south of the Sahara.

The decline of the Garamantian culture may have been connected to worsening climatic conditions, or overuse of water resources. Present-day desert in the Sahara was once agricultural land of fairly good quality that was further enhanced through the Garamantian irrigation system. As fossil water is a non-renewable resource, over several centuries of the Garamantian kingdom, the ground water level fell, thereby, contributing to its end in the late 7th century AD.

== Society and culture ==
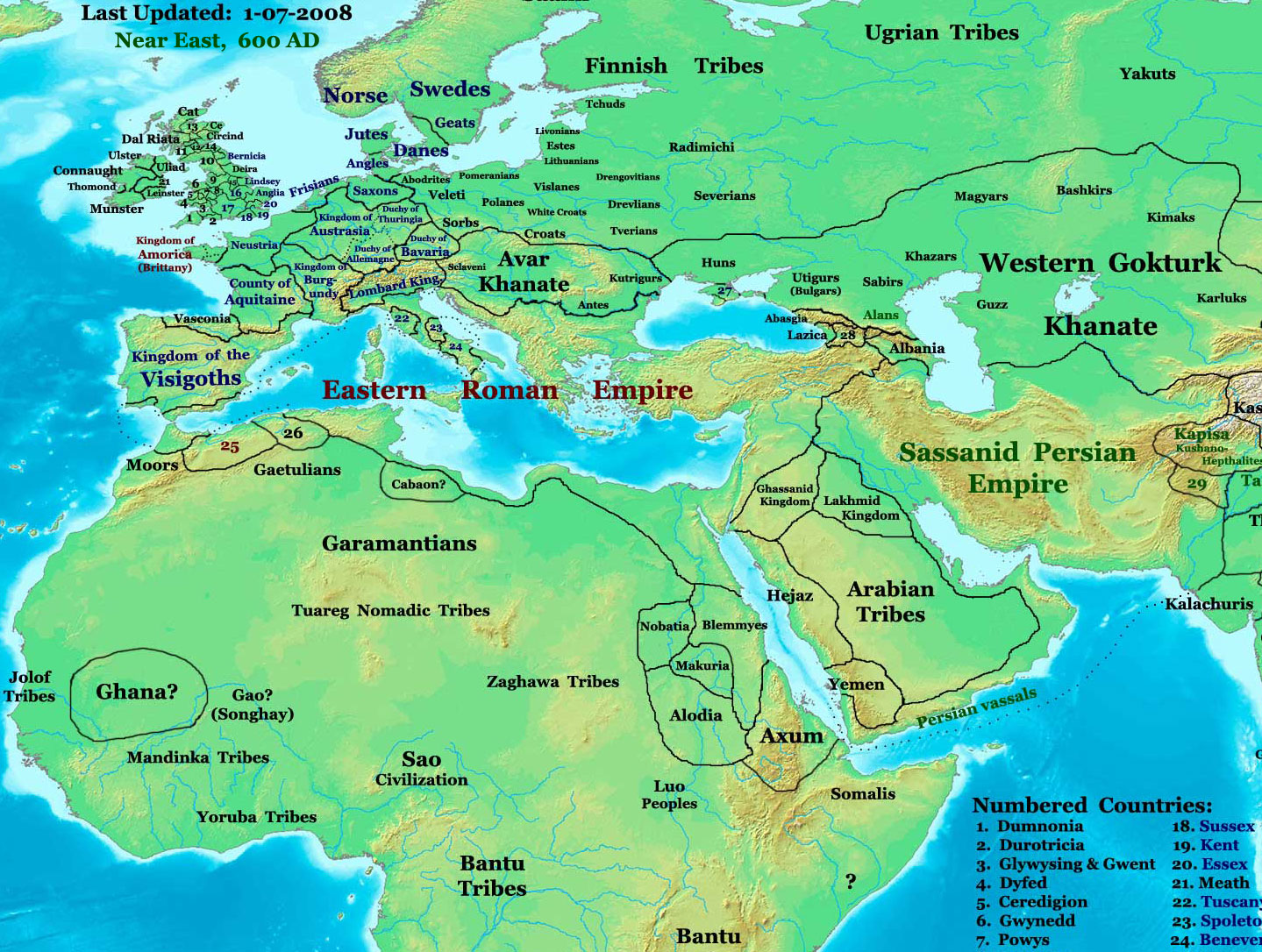
Location of the Garamantes in the Fezzan c. 600 AD, before the Islamic conquest.

In the 1960s, archaeologists excavated part of the Garamantes' capital at modern Germa (situated around 150 km west of modern-day Sabha) and named it Garama (an earlier capital, Zinkekara, was located not far from the later Garama). Current research indicates that the Garamantes had about eight major towns, three of which have been examined as of 2004. In addition they had a large number of other settlements. Garama had a population of around four thousand and another six thousand living in villages within a 5 km radius. Up to 50,000 people could have lived in the whole wadi. The king of the Garamantes controlled major trade routes that stretched deep into the interior of sub-Saharan Africa, reaching regions between the Niger Bend and Lake Chad. Key oases in the southern part of the Garamantian kingdom, especially Ghat and Barkat, served as important bases from which traders traveled into tropical Africa.

Nikita et al. (2011) indicated that the skeletons of the Garamantes do not suggest regular warfare or strenuous activities. Nikita et al. (2011) states: "The Garamantes exhibited low sexual dimorphism in the upper limbs, which is consistent to the pattern found in agricultural populations and implies that the engagement of males in warfare and construction works was not particularly intense. [...] the Garamantes did not appear systematically more robust than other North African populations occupying less harsh environments, indicating that life in the Sahara did not require particularly strenuous daily activities."

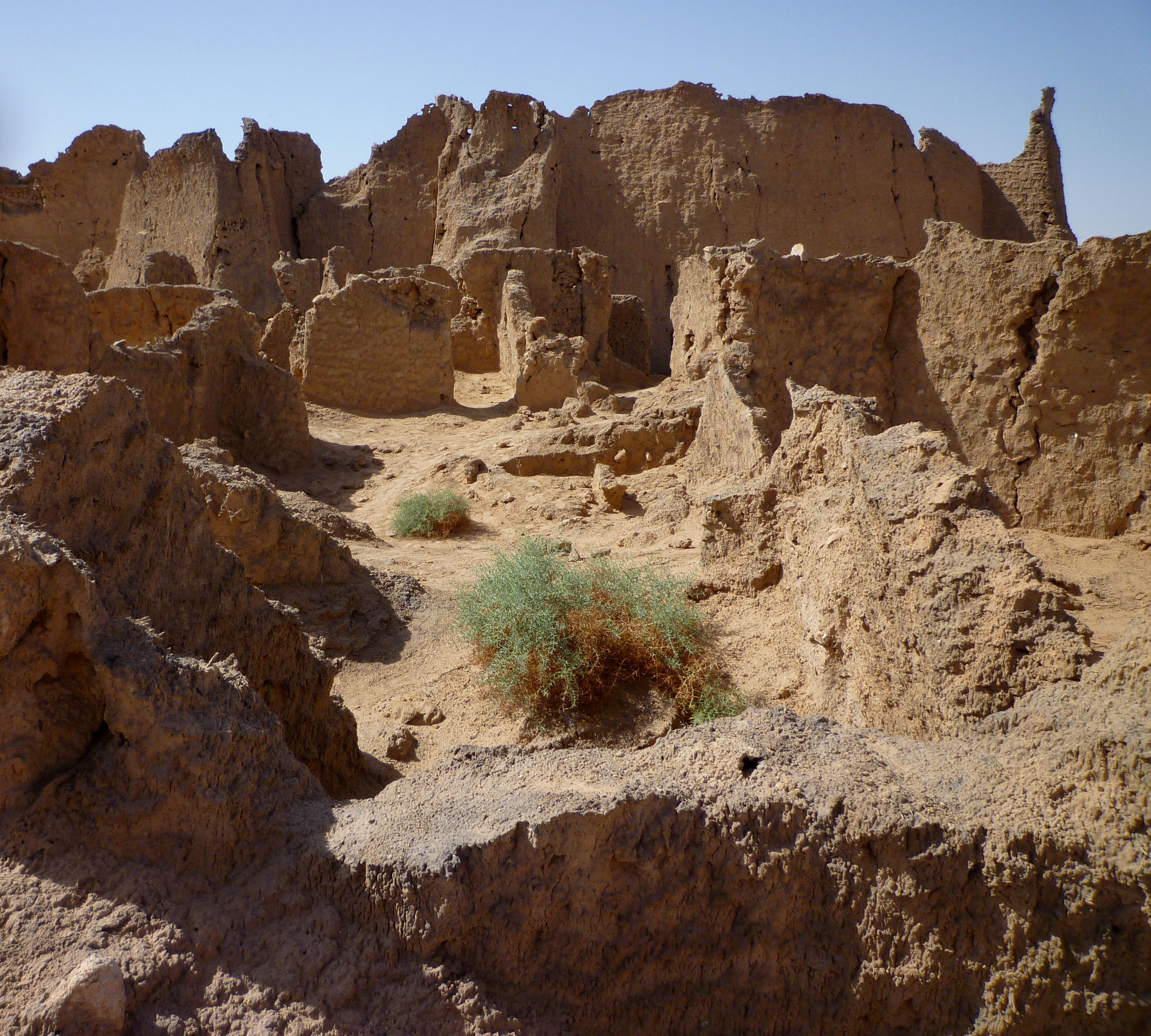
The ruins of Garama, one of the major settlements

Archaeological ruins associated with the Garamantian kingdom include numerous tombs, forts, and cemeteries. The Garamantes constructed a network of tunnels, and shafts to mine the fossil water from under the limestone layer under the desert sand. The dating of these foggara is disputed, they appear between 200 BC to 200 CE but continued to be in use until at least the 7th century and perhaps later. The network of tunnels is known to Berbers as Foggaras. The network allowed agriculture to flourish, and used a system of slave labor to keep it maintained.

In 2011, new satellite imagery showed more of the buildings and structures constructed by the Garamantes.

=== Slave raiding and trading ===
Based on Herodotus' account of Garamantes pursuing "Troglodyte Ethiopians", Sonja and Carlos Magnavita (2018) say that "Saharan slave raids against Black Africans in classical times" might be a speculative tale, though they admit that "hunting people for other purposes than for enslaving them is admittedly hard to imagine". Nonetheless, five centuries after Herodotus, Roman merchants established themselves in Leptis Magna (Libya) and Lixus (Morocco) to purchase the slaves the Berbers brought from Subsaharan Africa.

== Biological anthropology ==
In 1951, S. Sergi analysed human skeletal remains from the Fezzan dating from the end of the Pastoral period up to the Roman period in the first centuries AD. Sergi concluded that the Garamantes were mostly of 'Mediterranean' type, similar to modern Berbers, which he termed 'Euroafrican'. He also found an influx of 'Negroid' types and an increase of 'mixed' types dating mostly from the Roman period. In a review of the skeletal evidence analysed by Sergi, M.C. Chamla (1968) found that 46.6% of the individuals were of 'Eurafrican' type (closely related to Berbers), 26.6% were of mixed Eurafrican-Negroid type, and 26.6% were of 'a more predominantly Negroid' type.

According to David Mattingly et al. (2003):

The Garamantes contained a significant component of light-skinned Libyans and some at least of these people were buried in monumental graves. This picture differs from the situation in the Sahara in the late Neolithic, as Chamla's work suggests a higher proportion of negroid types at that date, which might suggest that the creation of Garamantian civilisation involved the in-migration of at least some part of the population from regions to the north or northeast. The cemeteries contain a substantial number (over 50 percent) of individuals of either mixed blood or full negro physionomy [sic]. Some of these individuals may have been in poorer graves, but not all of them, suggesting that some individuals of mixed race or black skin were prominent within Garamantian society. Given the literary testimony of Garamantian raids against their 'Ethiopian' neighbours, it is likely that some of the negroes present were slaves or descendants of slaves. The maintenance of strong non-negroid traits into late and post-Garamantian contexts would seem to indicate that intermixing of the races was not completely open and may have been structured within Garamantian society.

Francesca Ricci et al. (2013) analysed skeletal samples from two necropolises at the Garamantian site of Fewet in the Fezzan and found that they were similar to the Mediterranean 'Euroafrican' type identified by Sergi, but with some evidence for gene flow from (probably) sub-Saharan populations, "similarly to what Sergi (1951) suggested discussing the possible hybridization between the “Mediterranean” Group I and the “Negroid” Group IV." This gene flow was more evident in the female skeletons, suggesting an influx of non-local females possibly from the Sahel region. According to the study authors, these findings "support the hypothesis that there was a significant and progressive morphological change (at least for the horizontal cephalic index) across the time span covered by the two necropolises, in possible relationship with a constant occurrence of gene flow with other (tentatively sub-Saharan) populations."

Marta Mirazón Lahr et al. (2010) conducted research on skeletons from Fezzan dating from the Roman era and found that the skeletons clustered most closely with Neolithic Sahelian samples from Chad, Mali, and Niger, and secondarily to Roman Egyptians from Alexandria and Nubians from Soleb. 1st millennium BC samples from Algeria and Tunisia were somewhat more distant but still rather close to the Fezzan skeletons. Lahr et al. concluded that the Garamantes had connections with both the Sahel and northern Africa.

Efthymia Nikita et al. (2011) examined the biological affinities of the Garamantes using cranial nonmetric traits and the Mean Measure of Divergence and Mahalanobis D(2). They were compared to other North African populations, including the Egyptian, Algerian, Tunisian and Sudanese, roughly contemporary to them. Overall, three clusters were identified: (1) the Garamantes, (2) Gizeh and Kerma, and (3) Soleb, Alexandrians, Algerians and Carthaginians. The analysis concluded that the Garamantes were isolated, with the Sahara playing a role as a barrier to geneflow. The distance between the Garamantes and their neighbors was high and the population appeared to be an outlier.

The remains of a young sub-Saharan African woman, which has been dated to the 1st millennium BC and possessed a lip plug that is associated with Sahelian African groups, was buried among other Sub-Saharan Africans that were part of the heterogenous Garamantian population. Power et al. (2019) states: "This ornament demonstrates that some Garamantes individuals shared aspects of their material culture with Sahelian societies more broadly, either through migration or contact, while their burial within Garamantes cemeteries shows their integration into the normative funerary rituals of contemporary Garamantian society. The combination of morphometric and isotopic work further reinforces the view that Garamantian society included individuals of diverse geographical origin, some of whom may have been first generation Trans-Saharan migrants." The craniometric results also identified another sub-group within the Garamantes buried in the Wadi al-Ajjal, with a morphology that is widely observed among Mediterranean people.

== Language ==
Linguist Roger Blench (2006) stated: "The Garamantes, whose empire in the Libyan Fezzan was overthrown by the Romans, wrote in a Libyan script, although we have no evidence they spoke Berber. What they did speak is open to conjecture; the most likely hypothesis is a Nilo-Saharan language, related either to Songhay or to Teda—the present-day language of the Tibesti."

=== Script ===
The Garamantes may have used a nearly indecipherable form of proto-Tifinagh. Blench (2019) states:

One of the most problematic aspects is the language and inscriptions attributed to the Garamantes...Sites in the vicinity of Jarma, the Garamantian capital of what is now known as Fazzan, have abundant inscriptions (Fig. 14.7). 67 They are found cut or painted on dark grey amphorae, in the tombs of Garamantian cemeteries, such as those of Saniat bin Huwaydi.68 A recent project under the auspices of the British Library has digitised most of the known inscriptions and these are described in Biagetti et al.69 Although the inscriptions are in Berber characters, only some are decipherable. Various reasons for this have been suggested; either the messages were deliberately coded, so that only specific readers could understand them. Alternatively, they may have had a ‘ludic’ nature. The most exciting possibility is that they were in a non-Berber language, perhaps Nilo-Saharan or something unknown.
