= Women in ancient warfare =

Aspect of women's history

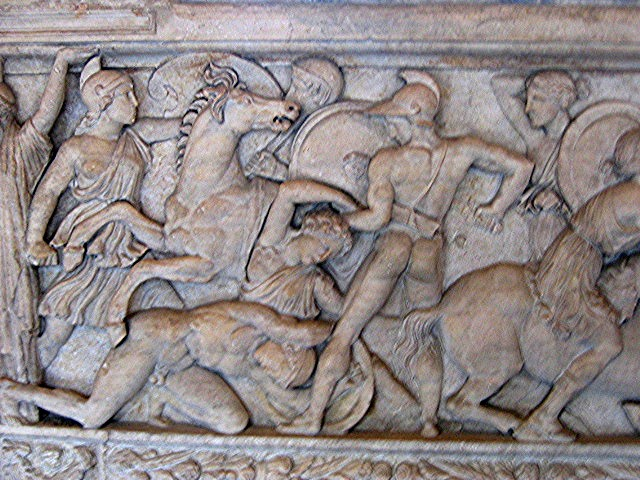
Amazonomachy battle between Greeks and Amazons, relief of a sarcophagus – c. 180 BCE, found in Thessaloniki, 1836, now in the Louvre, Department of Greek Antiquities

The role of women in ancient warfare differed from culture to culture. There have been various historical accounts of females participating in battle.

This article lists instances of women recorded as participating in ancient warfare, from the beginning of written records to approximately 500 CE. Contemporary archaeological research regularly provides better insight into the accuracy of ancient historical accounts.

Women active in direct warfare, such as warriors and spies, are included in this list. Also included are women who commanded armies, but did not fight.

== Timeline of women in ancient warfare worldwide ==
=== 16th century BC ===
- 16th century BC – Ahhotep I is credited with a stela at Karnak for "having pulled Egypt together, having cared for its army, having guarded it, having brought back those who fled, gathering up its deserters, having quieted the South, subduing those who defy her".
- Ahhotep II is buried with a dagger and axe, as well as three golden fly pendants, which were given as rewards for military valor. However, it is debated as to whether or not they actually belong to her.

=== 15th century BC ===
- 1479–1458 BC – Reign of Hatshepsut. It is possible that she led military campaigns against Nubia and Canaan.

=== 13th century BC ===
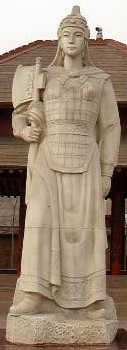
Statue of Fu Hao at Yinxu

- 13th century BC – Estimated time of the Trojan War. According to ancient sources, several women participate in battle (see Category:Women of the Trojan war). Epipole of Carystus is one of the first women who are reported to have fought in a war.
- 13th century BC – Lady Fu Hao, consort of the Chinese emperor Wu Ding, led 3,000 troops into battle during the Shang dynasty. Fu Hao had entered the royal household by marriage and took advantage of the semi-matriarchal slave society to rise through the ranks. Fu Hao is known to modern scholars mainly from inscriptions on Shang dynasty oracle bone artifacts unearthed at Yinxu. In these inscriptions she is shown to have led numerous military campaigns. The Tu fought against the Shang for generations until they finally were defeated by Fu Hao in a single decisive battle. Further campaigns against the neighbouring Yi, Qiang, and Ba followed, the latter is particularly remembered as the earliest recorded large-scale ambush in Chinese history. With up to 13,000 troops and the important generals Zhi and Hou Gao serving under her, she was the most powerful military leader of her time. This highly unusual status is confirmed by the many weapons, including great battle-axes, unearthed from her tomb. One of Wu Ding's other wives, Fu Jing, also participated in military expeditions.
- Vedic period (1200–1000 BC) roughly – The Rigveda (RV 1 and RV 10) hymns mention a female warrior named Vishpala, who lost a leg in battle, had an iron prosthesis made, and returned to warfare.

=== 12th century BC ===
- Mid-12th century BC – Deborah believed to have been appointed judge and defeated the army of King Jabin of Canaan, according to the Book of Judges.

=== 11th century BC ===
- 11th century BC – According to Geoffrey of Monmouth, Queen Gwendolen fought her husband, Locrinus, in battle for the throne of Britain. She defeated him and became the monarch. However, Geoffrey of Monmouth is not considered a reliable historical source.
- 11th century BC – 4th century CE – Approximate time for the burial of a Kangju woman in modern Kazakhstan who was buried with a sword and a dagger.

=== 10th century BC ===
- 10th century BC – According to Greek legendary history, Messene conquered a territory and founded a city at roughly this time.

=== 9th century BC ===
- Late 9th century–8th century BC – Shammuramat (Semiramis) ruled the Neo-Assyrian Empire. She was the first woman to rule an empire without a man ruling with her. She is believed to have been the inspiration for the legendary warrior queen Semiramis.
- Late 9th– 8th century BC – According to Geoffrey of Monmouth, Queen Cordelia, on whom the character in Shakespeare's King Lear is based, battled her nephews for control of her kingdom. However, Geoffrey of Monmouth is not considered a reliable historical source.

=== 8th century BCE ===
- 8th to 6th centuries BCE – Early Armenian period. A woman is buried in the Armenian highlands at this time. Her skeleton indicates strong muscles and a healed wound to her skeleton contained an iron arrowhead. Other injuries suggest that she was a warrior.
- 732 BCE – Approximate time of the reign of Samsi, an Arabian queen who may have been the successor of Zabibe. She revolted against the Assyrian king Tiglath-Pileser III.

=== 7th century BCE ===
- 660 BCE – Lady Xu Mu is credited with saving the state of Wey from military invasion with her appeals for aid. The Wey people remembered her for bringing supplies, getting military aid and rebuilding the state. She is also the first recorded female poet in Chinese history.
- 654 BCE – Lampsacus is founded by the Greeks. According to Greek legendary history, written centuries later, a Bebryces woman named Lampsace informed the Greeks of a plot against them by the Bebryces, and thus enabled them to conquer the area and found the city, which was named in her honor. She was deified and worshipped as a goddess.
- A Scythian warrior girl, aged approximately 13, is buried Saryg-Bulun in Central Tuva, Russia. The remains, discovered in 1988, were originally assumed to be male, but DNA sequencing in 2020 determines the mummy to be female.

=== 6th century BCE ===
- 6th through 4th centuries BCE – Women are buried with weapons as well as jewelry on the Kazakhstan-Russia border at roughly this time.
- 6th century BCE – Pheretima (Cyrenaean queen) leads a military force.

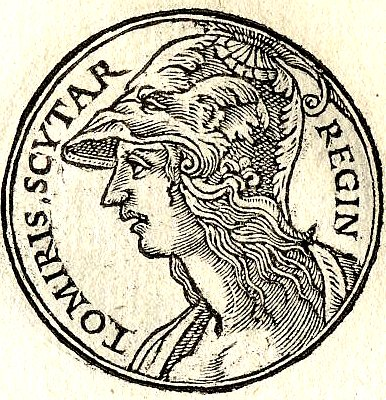
Tomyris from Promptuarii Iconum Insigniorum

- 580 BCE – Massagetae Queen Tomyris led an army that defeated a Persian army under Cyrus the Great. Tomyris would be known forever after as "the killer of Cyrus", although the actual soldier who slew Cyrus is unknown.
- 539 BCE – Pantea Arteshbod participate in the Battle of Opis as a Lieutenant Commander in the army of Cyrus the Great.
- 514–496 BCE – During the Warring States period of China, Sun Tzu wrote a contemporary report of how Ho Lu, King of Wu (ruled in 514–496) tested his skill by ordering him to train an army of 180 women.
- 510 BCE – Greek poet Telesilla defended the city of Argos from the Spartans.

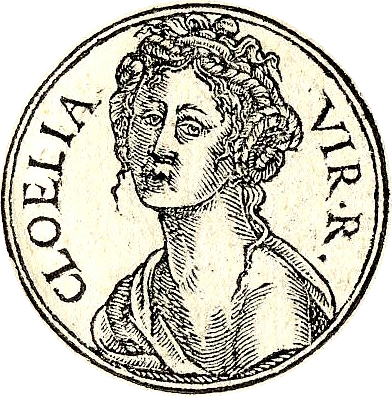
Cloelia from Promptuarii Iconum Insigniorum

- 506 BCE – Cloelia, a Roman girl who was given as a hostage to the Etruscans, escaped her captors and led several others to safety.

=== 5th century BCE ===
- 5th century BCE – The Lady of Yue trained the soldiers of the army of King Goujian of Yue.

Artemisia I of Caria from Promptuarii Iconum Insigniorum

- 480 BCE – Artemisia I of Caria, Queen of Halicarnassus, was a naval commander and advisor to Xerxes at the Battle of Salamis.
- 480 BCE – Greek diver Hydna and her father sabotaged enemy ships before a critical battle, thus causing the Greeks to win.
- 460–425 BCE – Greek historian Herodotus described Scythian Amazons. Herodotus' in The Histories recorded that queen Tomyris of the Massagetae fought and defeated Cyrus the Great. He also records the Zaueces people of Ancient Libya, whom he describes as having their women drive their chariots to war, as well as the festival of Athena Tritogenia among the Ausean people, whose young women are divided into two groups and fight each other with stones and sticks. This festival, taking place in Ancient Libya, describes the girls from the Machlyans and Auseans tribes fighting each other, and those who died were labeled false virgins.
- 460–370 BCE – Approximate lifetime of Hippocrates, who wrote of the Sauromatae, Scythian women fighting battles.
- Late 400s: Ctesias records the story of Zarinaea, a Sacae woman who participated in battle.

=== 4th century BCE ===
- 4th century BCE – Onomaris is estimated to have lived around this time period. According to Tractatus De Mulieribus, she led her people in migration to a new land and conquered the local inhabitants.
- 4th century BCE – Cynane, a half-sister to Alexander the Great, accompanied her father on a military campaign and killed an Illyrian leader named Caeria in hand-to-hand combat, and defeated the Illyrian army.
- 4th century BCE – Pythagorean philosopher, Timycha, was captured by Sicilian soldiers during a battle. She and her husband were the only survivors. She is admired for her defiance after capture, because while being questioned by the Sicilian tyrant, she bit off her tongue and spat it at his feet.
- 4th century BCE – Chinese statesman Shang Yang wrote The Book of Lord Shang, in which he recommended dividing the members of an army into three categories; strong men, strong women, and the weak and old of both sexes. He recommended that the strong men serve as the first line of defence, that the strong women defend the forts and build traps, and that the weak and elderly of both sexes control the supply chain. He also recommended that these three groups not be intermingled, on the basis that doing so would be detrimental to morale.
- 4th century BCE – Artemisia II of Caria led a fleet and played a role in the military-political affairs of the Aegean after the decline in Athenian naval superiority.
- 350 BCE – According to Heracleides of Cyme, Achaemenid kings employed a 300-woman entourage of concubines who served also as bodyguards.
- 339 BCE – Mania became satrap of Dardanus. Polyaenus described her as going into battle riding in a chariot, and as being such an excellent general that she was never defeated.
- 335 BCE – Timoclea, after being raped by one of Alexander the Great's soldiers during his attack on Thebes, pushed her rapist down a well and killed him. Alexander was so impressed with her cunning in luring him to the well that he ordered her to be released and that she not be punished for killing his soldier.
- 333 BCE – Stateira I accompanied her husband Darius III while he went to war. It was because of this that she was captured by Alexander the Great after the Battle of Issus at the town of Issus. Other female family members, including Drypetis, Stateira II, and Sisygambis were present and were captured as well.
- 332 BCE – The Nubian queen, Candace of Meroe, intimidated Alexander the Great with her armies and her strategy while confronting him, causing him to avoid Nubia, instead heading to Egypt, according to Pseudo-Callisthenes. However, Pseudo-Callisthenes is not considered a reliable source, and it is possible that the entire event is fiction. More reliable historical accounts indicate that Alexander never attacked Nubia and never attempted to move farther south than the oasis of Siwa in Egypt.
- 331 BCE – Alexander the Great and his troops burned down Persepolis several months after its capture; traditionally Thaïs (a hetaera who accompanied Alexander on campaigns) suggested it when they were drunk, but others record that it had been discussed previously.
- January 330 BCE – Youtab fights against Greek Macedonian King Alexander the Great at the Battle of the Persian Gate.
- 320s BCE – Cleophis surrendered to Alexander the Great after he laid siege to her city. In the same battle, the wives of Indian mercenaries took up the weapons and armors of their fallen husbands and fought against the Macedonians.
- 320s BCE – Reign of Chandragupta Maurya, who started the custom of kings of the ancient India to employ armed women as bodyguards. They rode war chariots, horses and elephants, and would also partake in military campaigns. This custom apparently was still in force until the Gupta period (320 to 550 AD).
- 324 BCE – The satrap Atropates presented Alexander the Great with 100 horsewomen armed with war axes and light shields. Alexander did not add them to his army, however, believing their presence might incite his troops to molest them. This has been considered related to the myth of Thalestris.
- 318 BCE – Eurydice III of Macedon fought Polyperchon and Olympias.
- 314–308 BCE – Cratesipolis commanded an army and forced cities to submit to her.

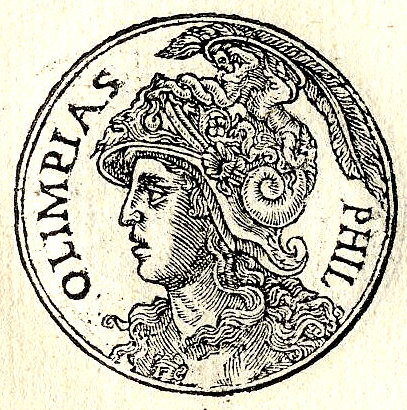
Olympias from Promptuarii Iconum Insigniorum

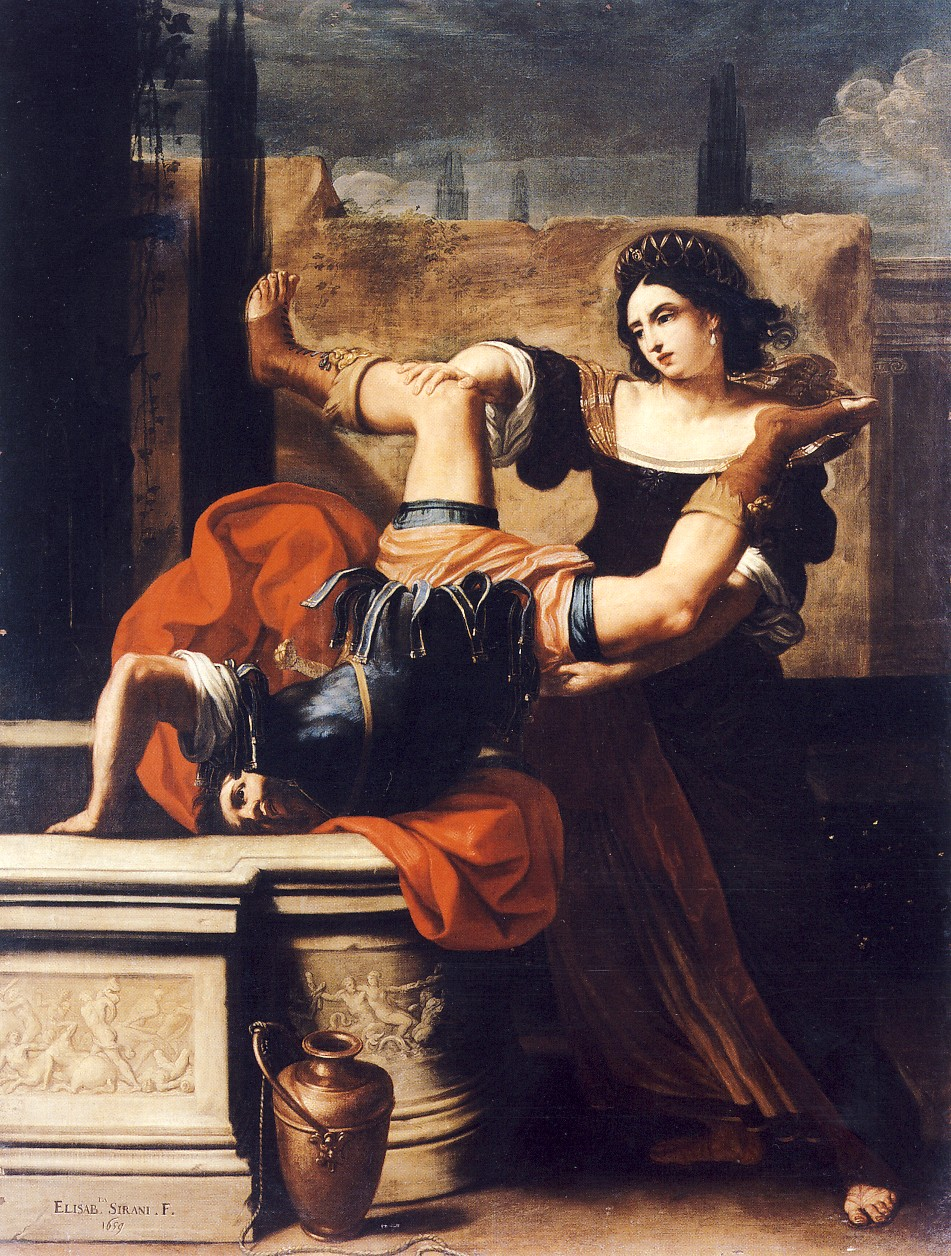
Timoclea

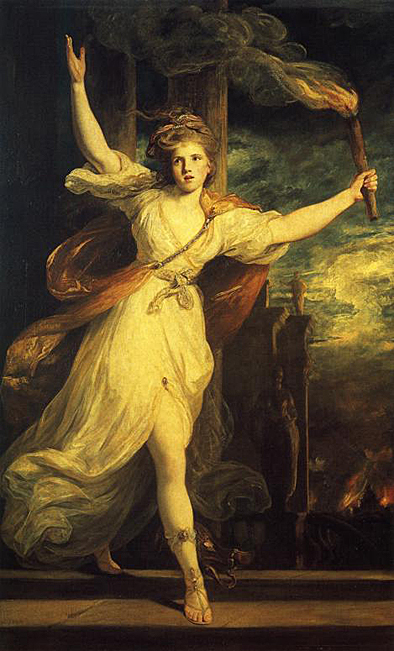
18th century depiction of Thaïs

=== 3rd century BCE ===
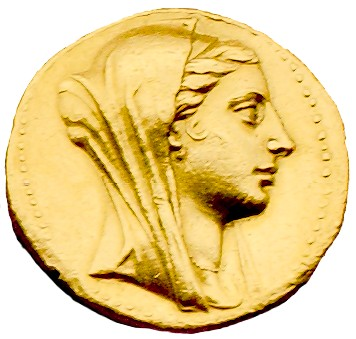
Arsinoe III of Egypt

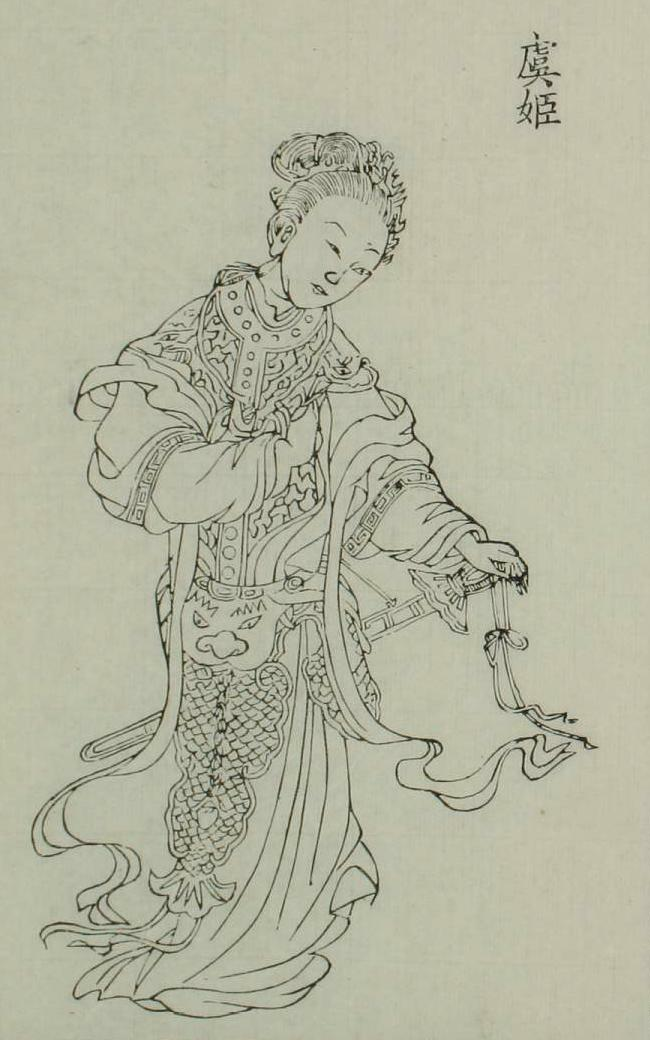
Consort Yu

- Early 3rd century BCE – Legendary Empress Jingū of Japan may have led an invasion against Korea at this time. However, the story is regarded as semi-fictional by many scholars.
- 3rd century BCE – Graves of women warriors buried at during this period were found near the Sea of Azov.
- 3rd century BCE – Stratonice of Macedon revolts against Seleucus II Callinicus.
- 295 BCE – Phila (daughter of Antipater) was besieged in Salamis, Cyprus by the king of Egypt Ptolemy I, and ultimately compelled to surrender, but was treated by him in the most honourable manner and sent together with her children in safety to Macedonia.
- 279 BCE – During the Gallic Invasion of Greece a large Gallic force entered Aetolia. Women and the elderly joined in its defense.
- 272 BCE – When Pyrrhus attacked Sparta, the women of the city assisted in the defense, assisted by Chilonis.
- 272 BCE – Spartan princess Archidamia leads Spartan women in the construction of a defensive trench and in the aiding of the wounded in battle during the siege of Pyrrhus.
- 272 BCE – Pyrrhus of Epirus, the conqueror and source of the term pyrrhic victory, according to Plutarch died while fighting an urban battle in Argos when an old woman threw a roof tile at him, stunning him and allowing an Argive soldier to kill him.
- 231 BCE – Teuta (Illyrian: *Teutana, 'mistress of the people, queen'; Ancient Greek: Τεύτα; Latin: Teuta) was the queen regent of the Ardiaei tribe in Illyria. Following the death of her spouse Agron in 231 BC, she assumed the regency of the Ardiaean Kingdom for her stepson Pinnes, continuing Agron's policy of expansion in the Adriatic Sea, in the context of an ongoing conflict with the Roman Republic regarding the effects of Illyrian piracy on regional trade.
- 220 BCE – Vaccaei and Vetton women fought in the siege of Salmantica against Hannibal. The inhabitants pretended to give up the city, but the women carried hidden weapons in their clothing while they exited, and once outside they armed themselves and the men and attacked the Carthaginians. One of the women disarmed the Carthaginian interpreter, Banno, and attacked him with his own spear. Many of the Salmantines managed to reach the mountains, from where they negotiated with Hannibal. The latter was so impressed that he gave them back their city.
- 220 BCE – Cisalpine Gaul women served as judges in their people's disputes with Hannibal.
- 219 BCE – A possibly fictitious Libyan princess named Asbyte fights for Hannibal at the Siege of Saguntum along with an entourage of horsewomen and war charioteers.
- 217 BCE – Arsinoe III of Egypt accompanied Ptolemy IV at the Battle of Raphia. When the battle went poorly, she appeared before the troops and exhorted them to fight to defend their families. She also promised two minas of gold to each of them if they won the battle, which they did.
- 216 BCE – During the siege of Petelia, women accompanied their husbands in sorties against Hannibal.
- 216 BCE – Busa of Canosa di Puglia is recorded as aiding soldiers fleeing Hannibal.
- 206 BCE – Iberian women assisted in the siege of Illiturgis against Scipio Africanus.
- 206–202 BCE – Consort Yu accompanies Xiang Yu on all battles during the Chu–Han Contention.

=== 2nd century BCE ===
- 2nd century BCE – Queen Stratonice convinced Docimus to leave his stronghold, and her forces took him captive.
- 2nd century BCE – The Book of Judith was probably written at this time. It describes Judith as assassinating Holofernes, an enemy general. However, this incident is regarded by historians fictional due to the historical anachronisms within the text.
- Late 2nd century BCE – Amage, a Sarmatian queen, attacked a Scythian prince who was making incursions onto her protectorates. She rode to Scythia with 120 warriors, where she killed his guards, his friends, his family, and ultimately, killed the prince himself. She allowed his son to live on the condition that he obey her.
- 186 BCE – Chiomara, a Galatian princess, was captured in a battle between Rome and the Galatians and was raped by a centurion. After a reversal she ordered him killed by her companions, and she had him beheaded after he was dead. She then delivered his head to her husband.
- 2nd century BCE – Queen Rhodogune of Parthia was informed of a rebellion while preparing for her bath. She vowed not to brush her hair until the rebellion was ended. She waged a long war to suppress the rebellion, and won it without breaking her vow.
- 138 BCE – The Roman Decimus Junius Brutus found that in Lusitania the women were "fighting and perishing in company with the men with such bravery that they uttered no cry even in the midst of slaughter". He also noted that the Bracari women were "bearing arms with the men, who fought never turning, never showing their backs, or uttering a cry."
- 131 BCE – Cleopatra II led a rebellion against Ptolemy VIII in 131 BCE, and drove him and Cleopatra III out of Egypt.
- 102 BCE – A battle between Romans and the Teutonic Ambrones at Aquae Sextiae took place during this time. Plutarch described that "the fight had been no less fierce with the women than with the men themselves... the women charged with swords and axes and fell upon their opponents uttering a hideous outcry." The women attacked both the Romans and the Ambrones who tried to desert.
- 102/101 BCE – General Marius of the Romans fought the Teutonic Cimbrians. Cimbrian women accompanied their men into war, created a line in battle with their wagons and fought with poles and lances, as well as staves, stones, and swords. When the Cimbrian women saw that defeat was imminent, they killed their children and committed suicide rather than be taken as captives.
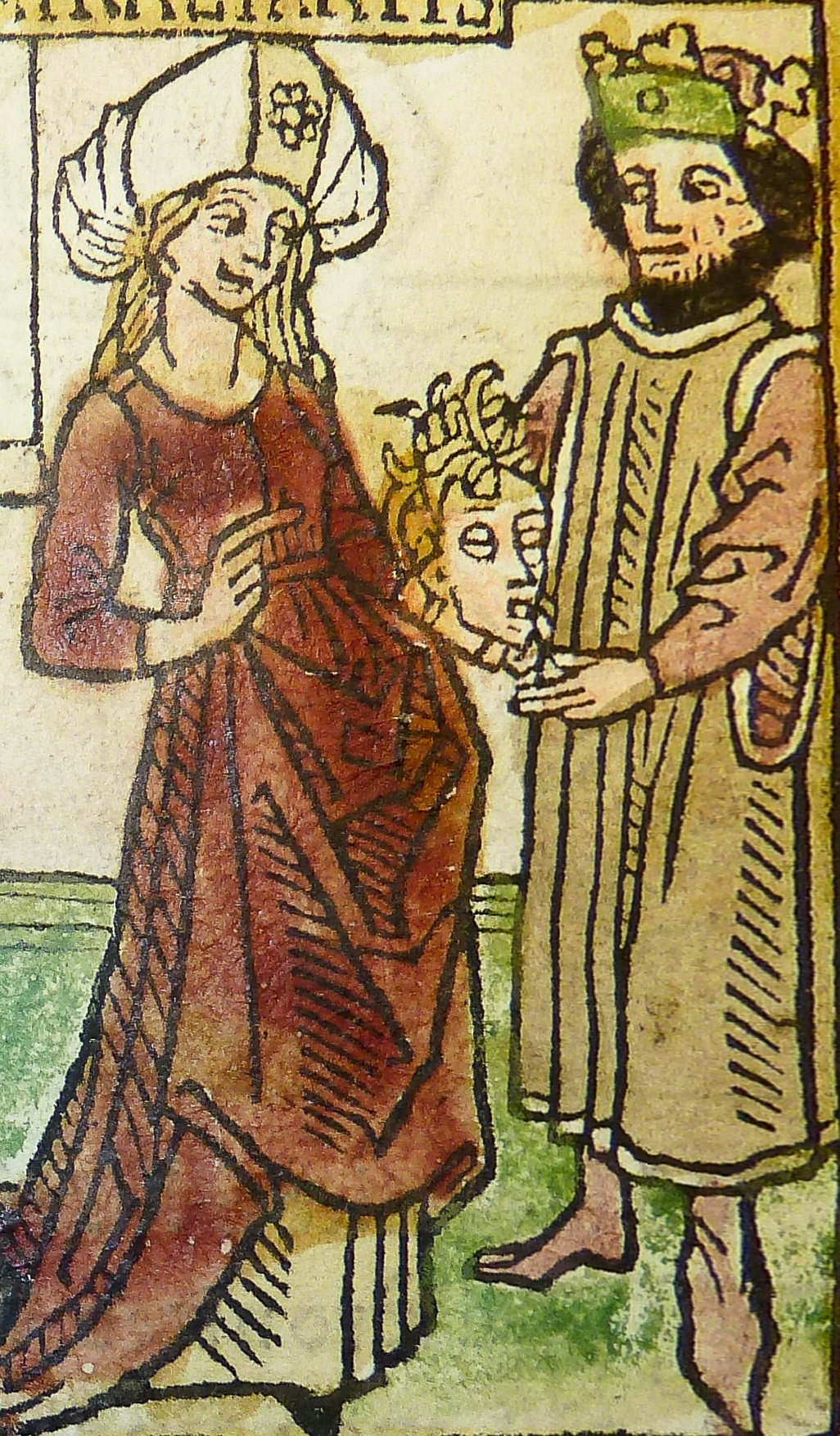
Chiomara

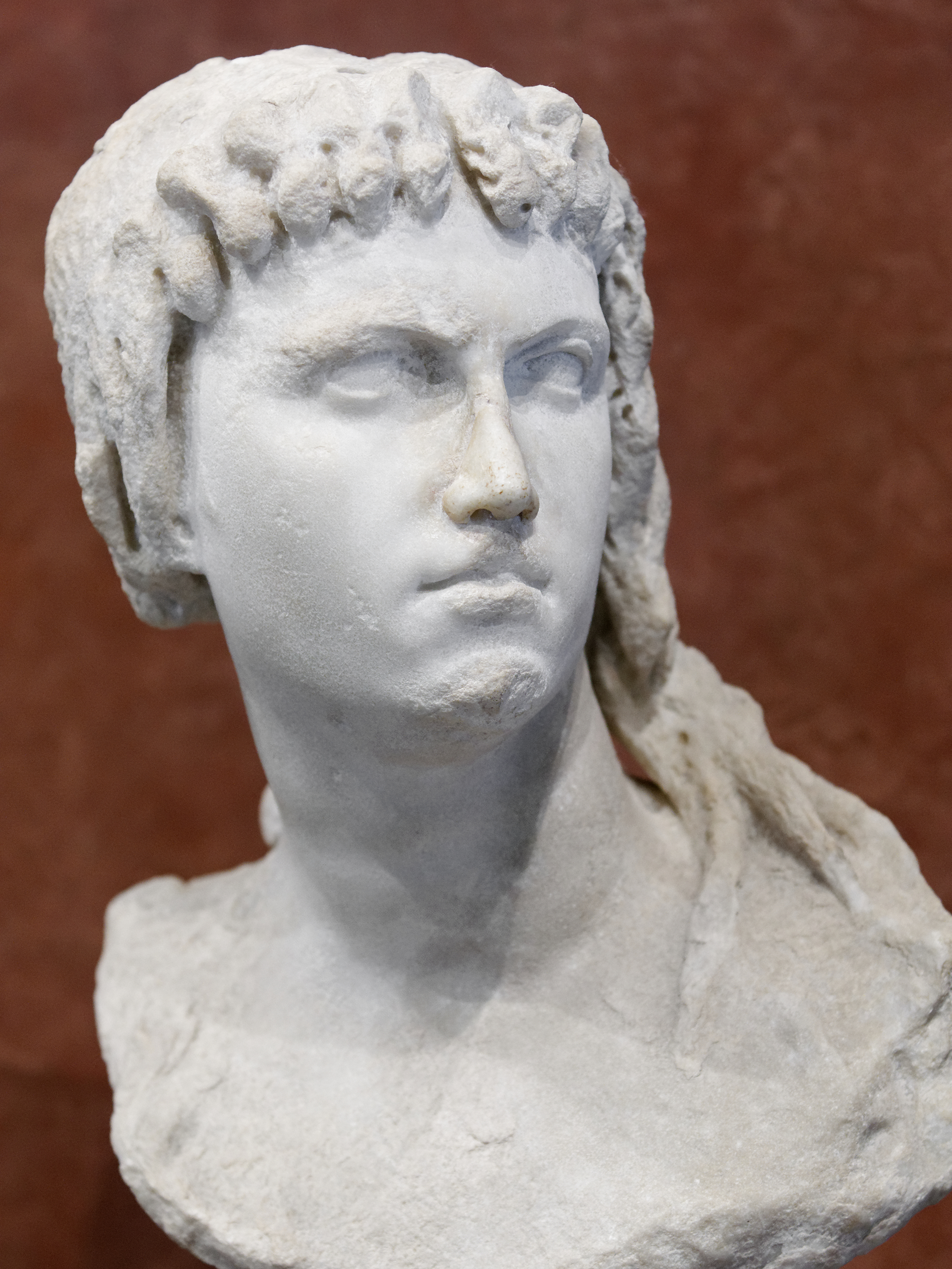
Cleopatra II

=== 1st century BCE ===
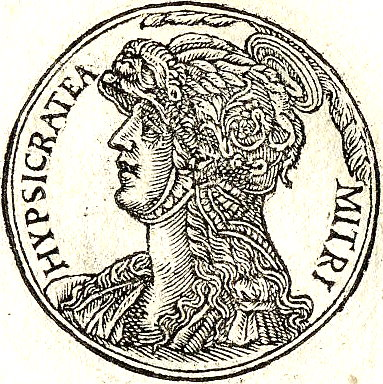
Hypsicratea from Promptuarii Iconum Insigniorum

- 1st century BCE – Hypsicratea fights in battles.
- 41–40 BCE – Fulvia becomes involved in the Perusine War. The extent of her involvement is not agreed upon by scholars.
- 27–21 BCE – Amanirenas led the Kushite armies against the Romans.
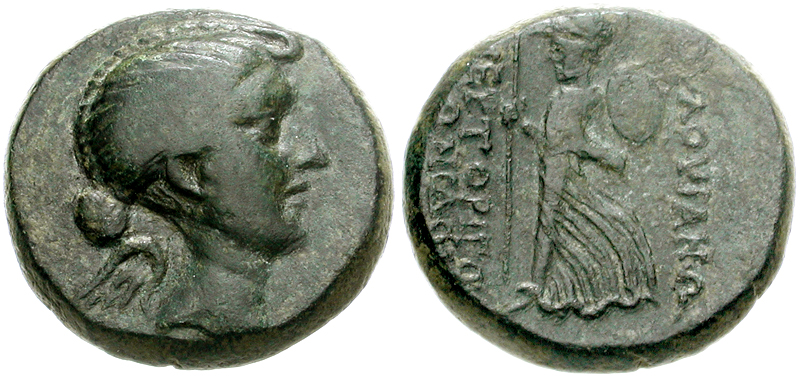
Fulvia of Roman Empire

=== 1st century CE ===
- 1st century – There were detailed reports of women accompanying their men on Germanic battlefields to provide morale support. Tacitus mentions them twice; in his Germania and again in his Annals, specifically at the battle near modern Nijmegen when the XV Primigenia and V Alaudae legions were sent packing back to Castra Vetera where they were later besieged during the Revolt of the Batavi. He writes in detail how the women would gather behind the warhost, and show their breasts to flagging warriors while screaming that their loss that day would mean the enemy gaining these as slaves. Women held an honored position in German tribes, and were seen as holy spirits as shown by their adoration of such as Aurinia and Veleda. Slavery was the fate of cowards and the unlucky – and letting one's women fall into that fate was a hideous deed. Thus the men were encouraged to fight harder.
- 1st century – A Sarmatian woman was buried with weapons in what is now modern Russia.
- 1st century – A woman was entombed with a sword in Tabriz, Iran. The tomb was discovered in 2004.
- 1st century – Cartimandua, queen of the Brigantes, allied with the Roman Empire against other Britons.
- 1st century: The historian Tacitus wrote that Triaria, wife of Lucius Vitellius the younger, was accused of having armed herself with a sword and behaved with arrogance and cruelty while at Tarracina, a captured city.
- 1st century: There are several historical Roman references to female gladiators from this time period.
- 1st century – 5th century: Four women were buried in Phum Snay, Cambodia with metal swords. The graves date approximately from this time period, and were discovered in 2007.
- 14–18 – Lu Mu, a Chinese peasant also known as Mother Lu, led a rebellion against Wang Mang.
- 15 – Agrippina the Elder defends a bridge upon the Rhine.
- 21 – Debate erupted as to whether or not the wives of Roman governors should accompany their husbands in the provinces. Caecina Severus said that they should not, because they "paraded among the soldiers" and that "a woman had presided at the exercises of the cohorts and the manoeuvres of the legions".
- 40 – The Trung Sisters revolt against the Chinese in Vietnam. Phung Thi Chinh joins them.
- 60 – According to Tacitus, druidesses among the Britannian lines waged psychological warfare against the Roman forces in the island of Mona.
- 60–61 – Boudica, a Celtic queen of the Iceni in Britannia, led a massive uprising against the occupying Roman forces. According to Suetonius, her enemy Gaius Suetonius Paulinus encouraged his soldiers by joking that her army contained more women than men, implying the presence of warrior women.
- 69–70 – Veleda of the Germanic Bructeri tribe wielded a great deal of influence in the Batavian rebellion. She was acknowledged as a strategic leader, a priestess, a prophet, and as a living deity.
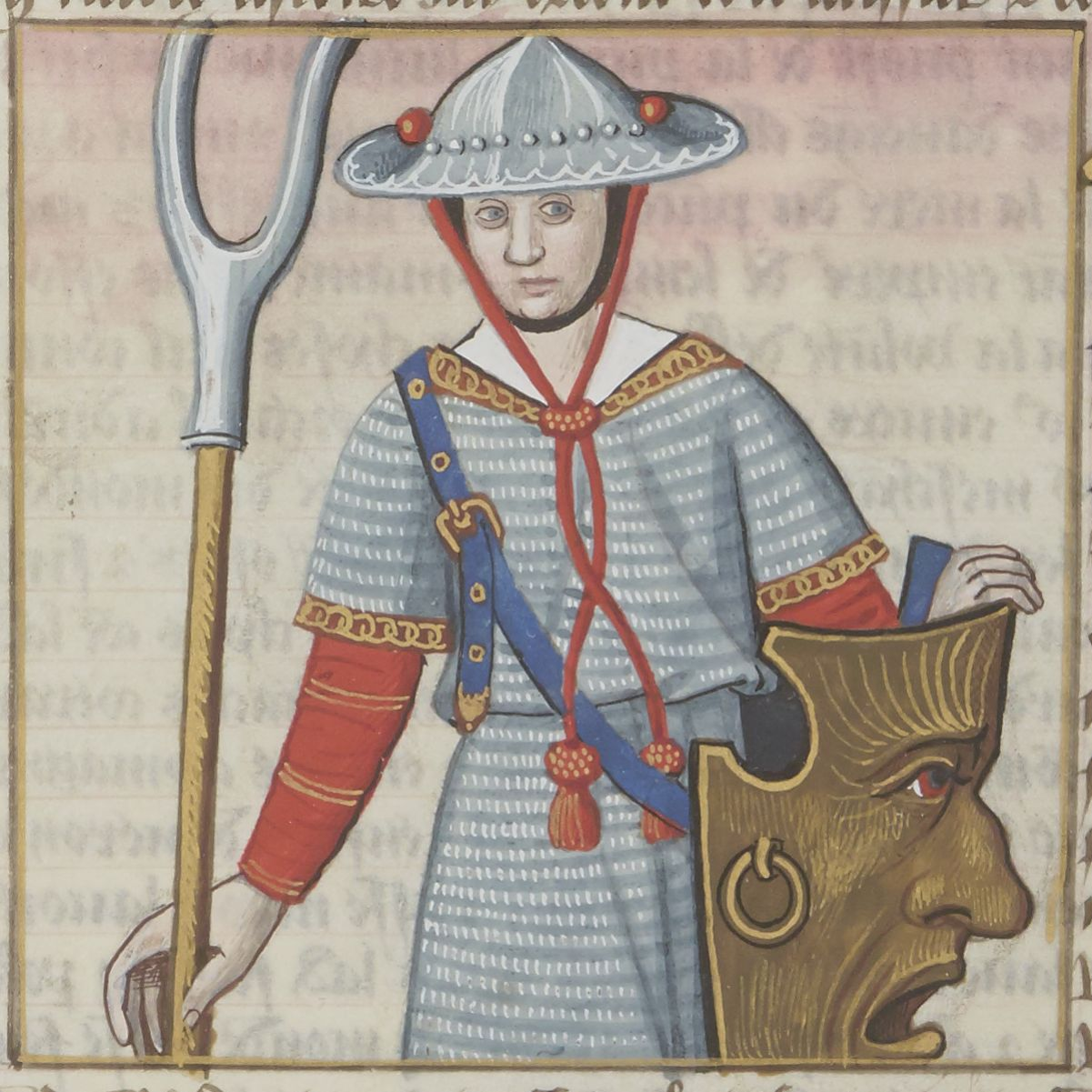
Medieval depiction of Triaria

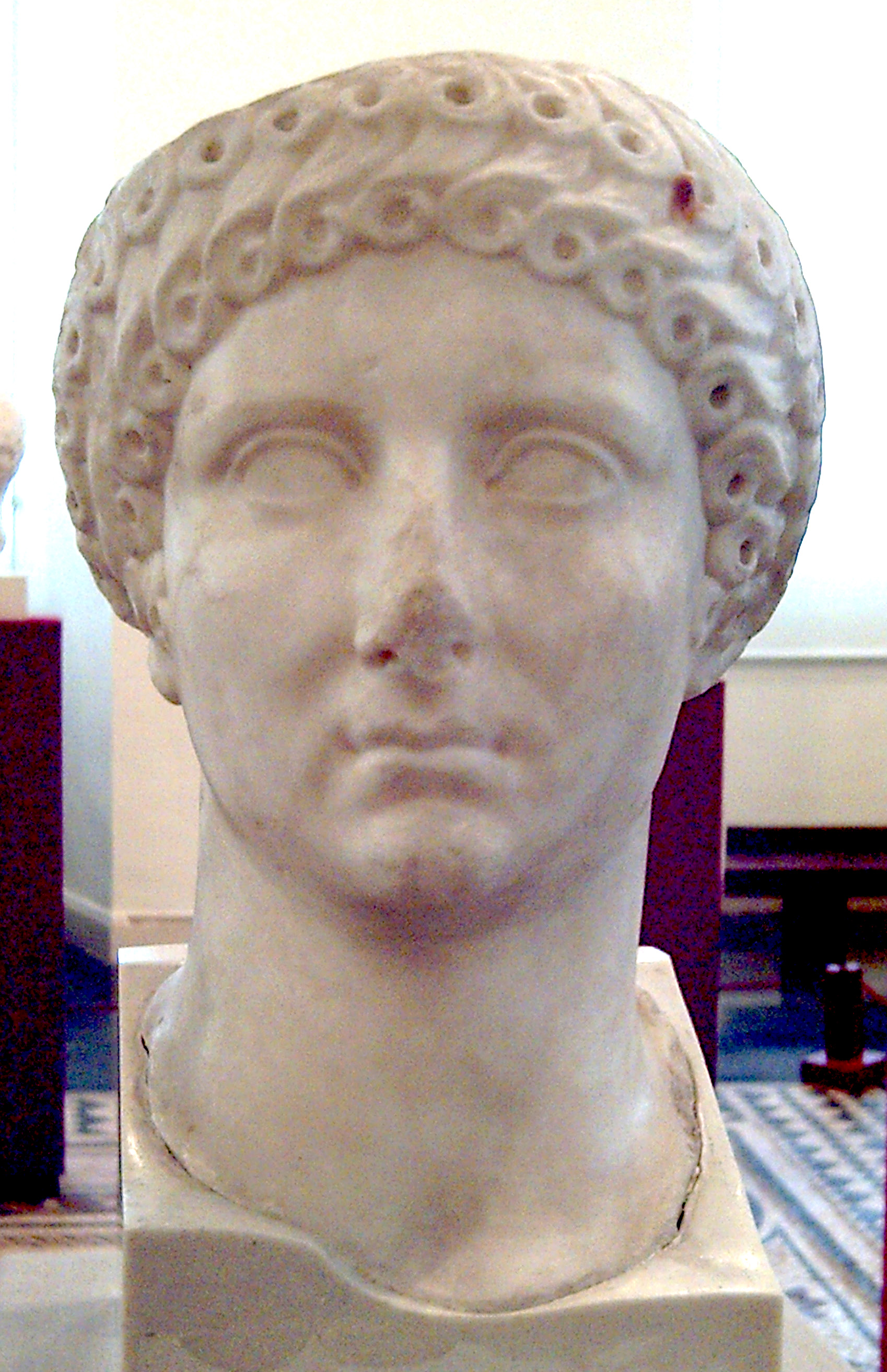
Agrippina the Elder

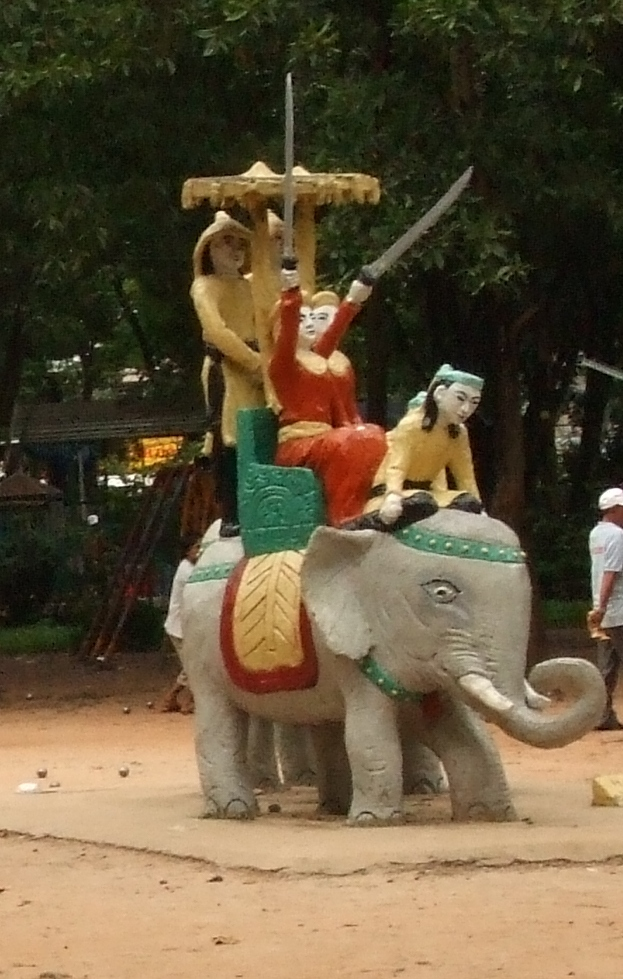
Statue of the Trung sisters in Ho Chi Minh City

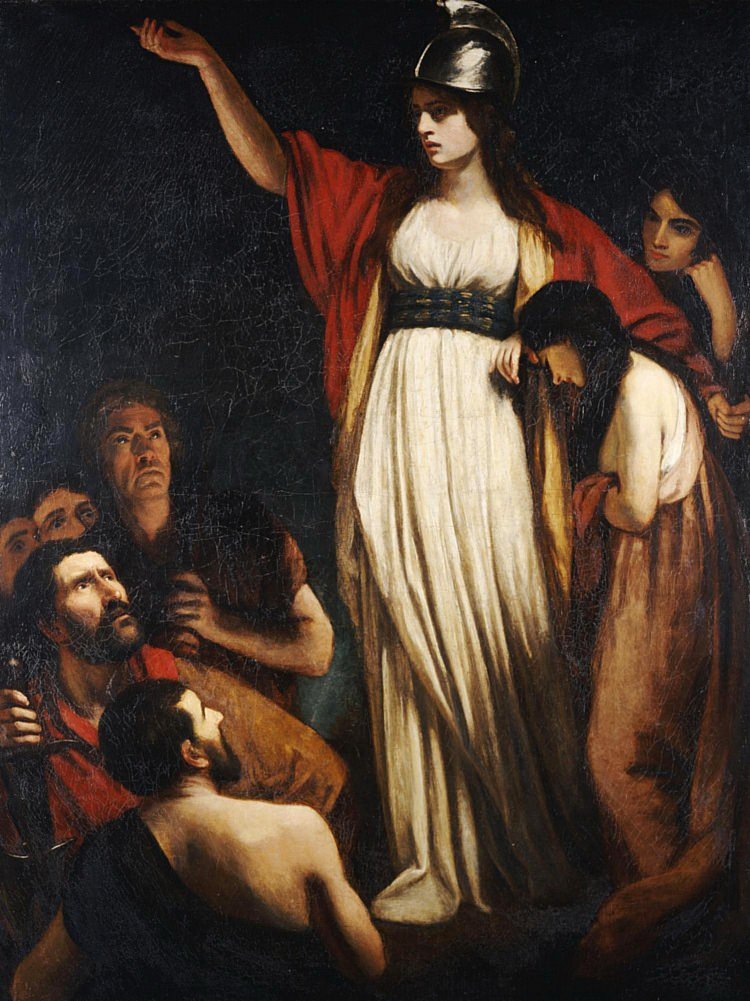
John Opie's Boadicea Haranguing the Britons

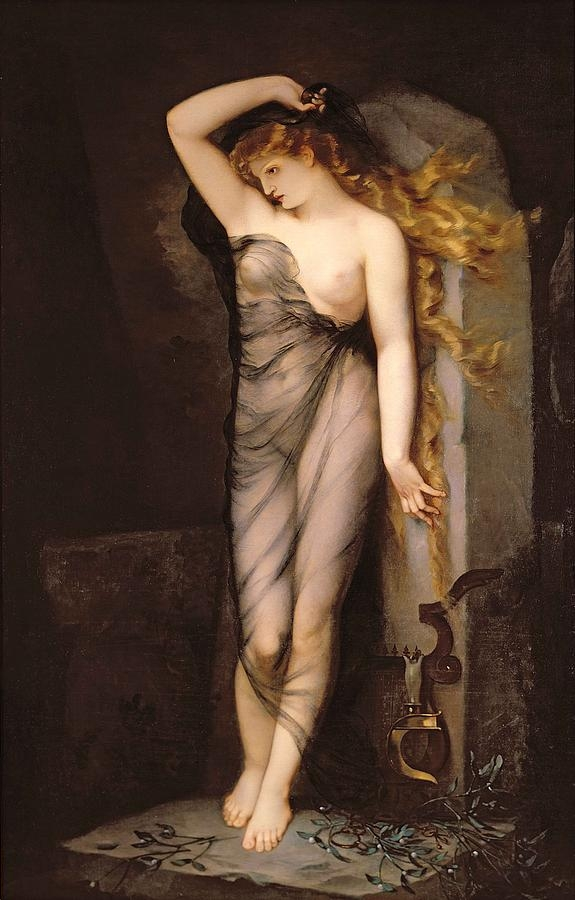
Veleda

=== 2nd century CE ===
- In this time period, Pausanias describes a sacrificial feast to Ares Gynaecothoenas in Tegea in which only women are allowed to participate, due to them having defeated Lacedaemonians without male help.
- 170–174: Faustina the Younger accompanies her husband to war in Germany, and is hailed as "Mother of the Army" after one of his victories.
- 195 – Julia Domna accompanied her husband, Emperor Septimius Severus, in his campaigns in Mesopotamia.
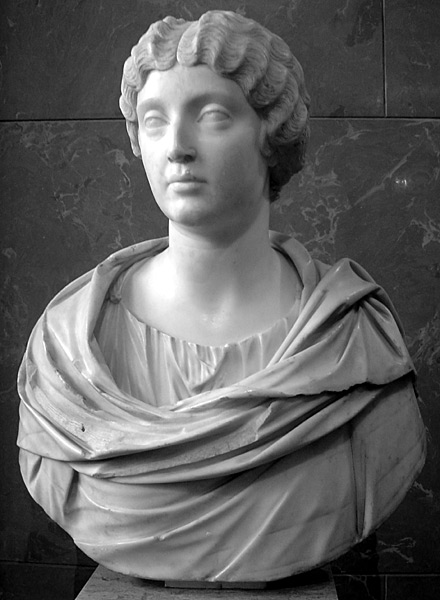
Faustina the Younger

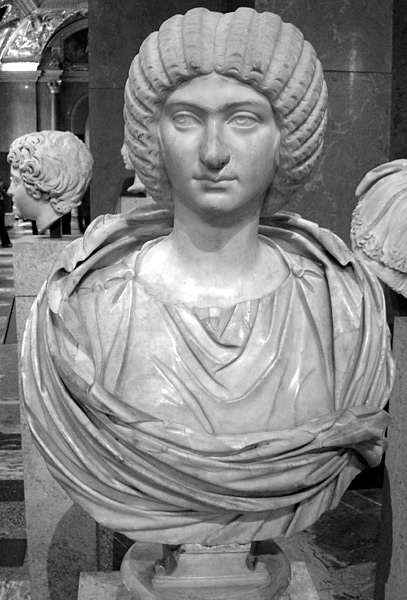
Julia Domna

=== 3rd century CE ===
- 210s – Wang Yi (wife of Zhao Ang) participated in multiple battles alongside her husband against the warlord Ma Chao.
- 240s – Women are described as fighting amongst the cavalry ranks of the Sasanian Empire under Shapur I, dressed and armed like men.
- 248 – Trieu Thi Trinh led a rebellion against the Chinese in Vietnam.
- 270–272 – Zenobia, the queen of Palmyra, led armies into battle against the Roman Empire.
- 274 – A group of Gothic women, who were captured by Romans while fighting in the same garb as their male peers, were paraded in a Roman triumph wearing signs that said, "Amazons".
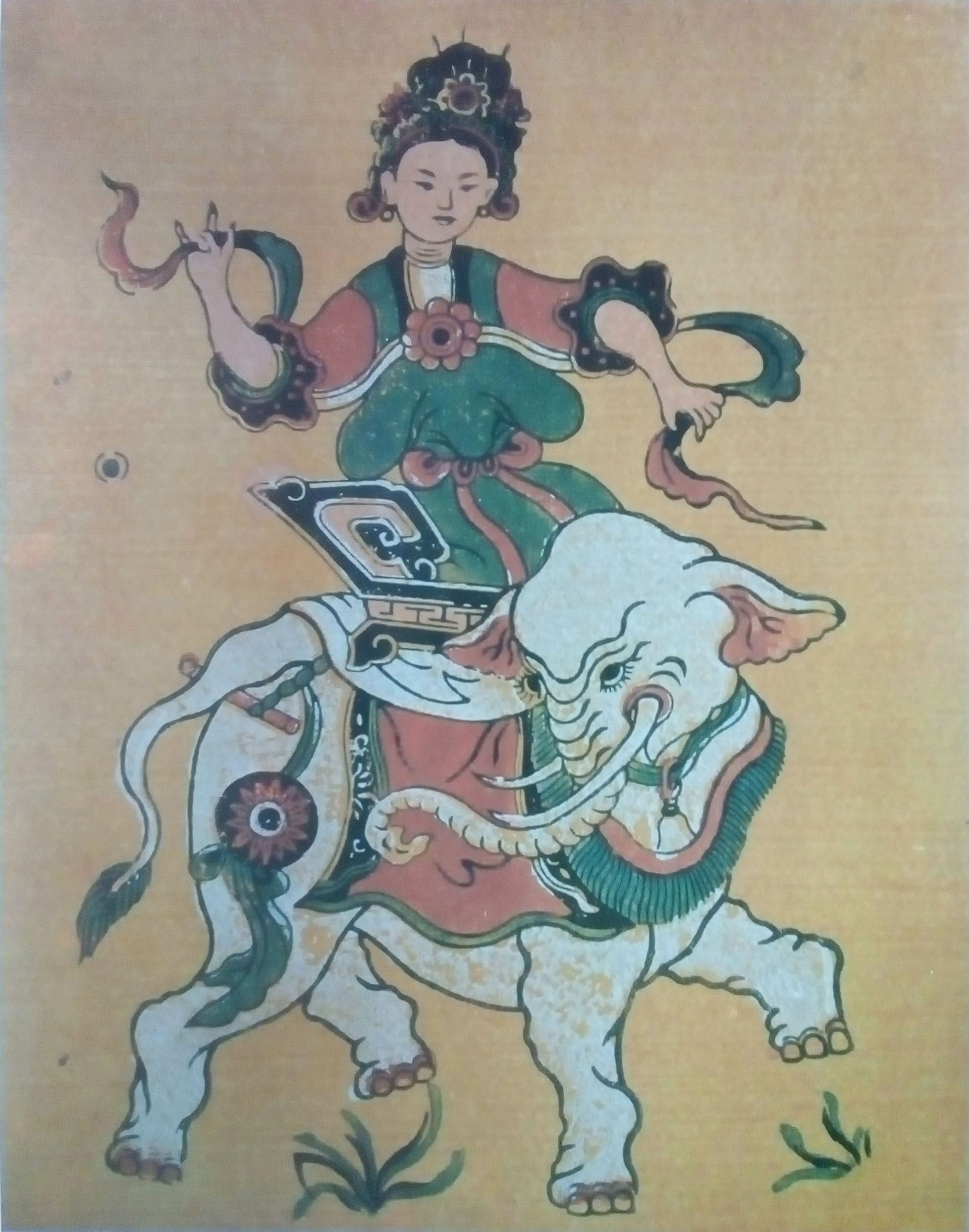
Folk art depiction of Lady Triệu

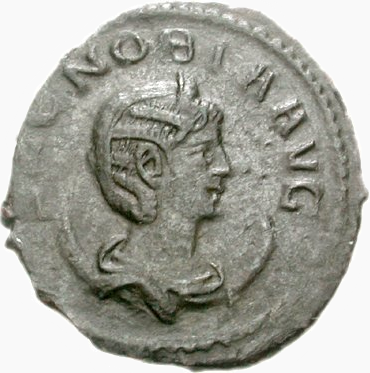
Coin depicting Zenobia

=== 4th century CE ===
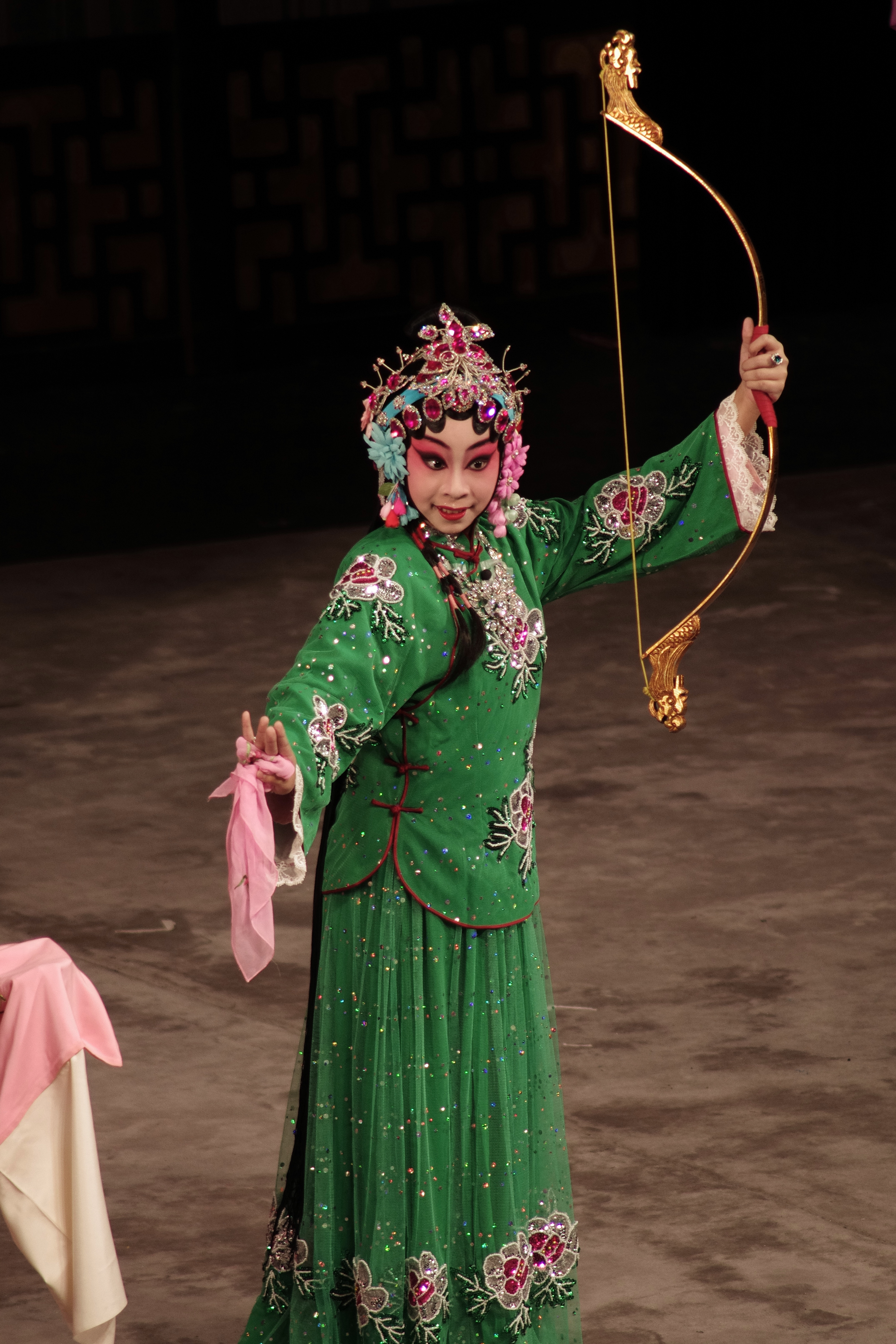
Xun Guan portrayed by a Peking opera actress during a 2015 performance in Tianchan Theatre, Shanghai, China.

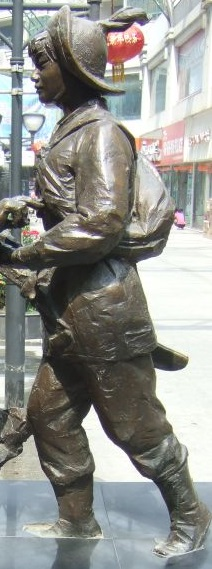
Hua Mulan

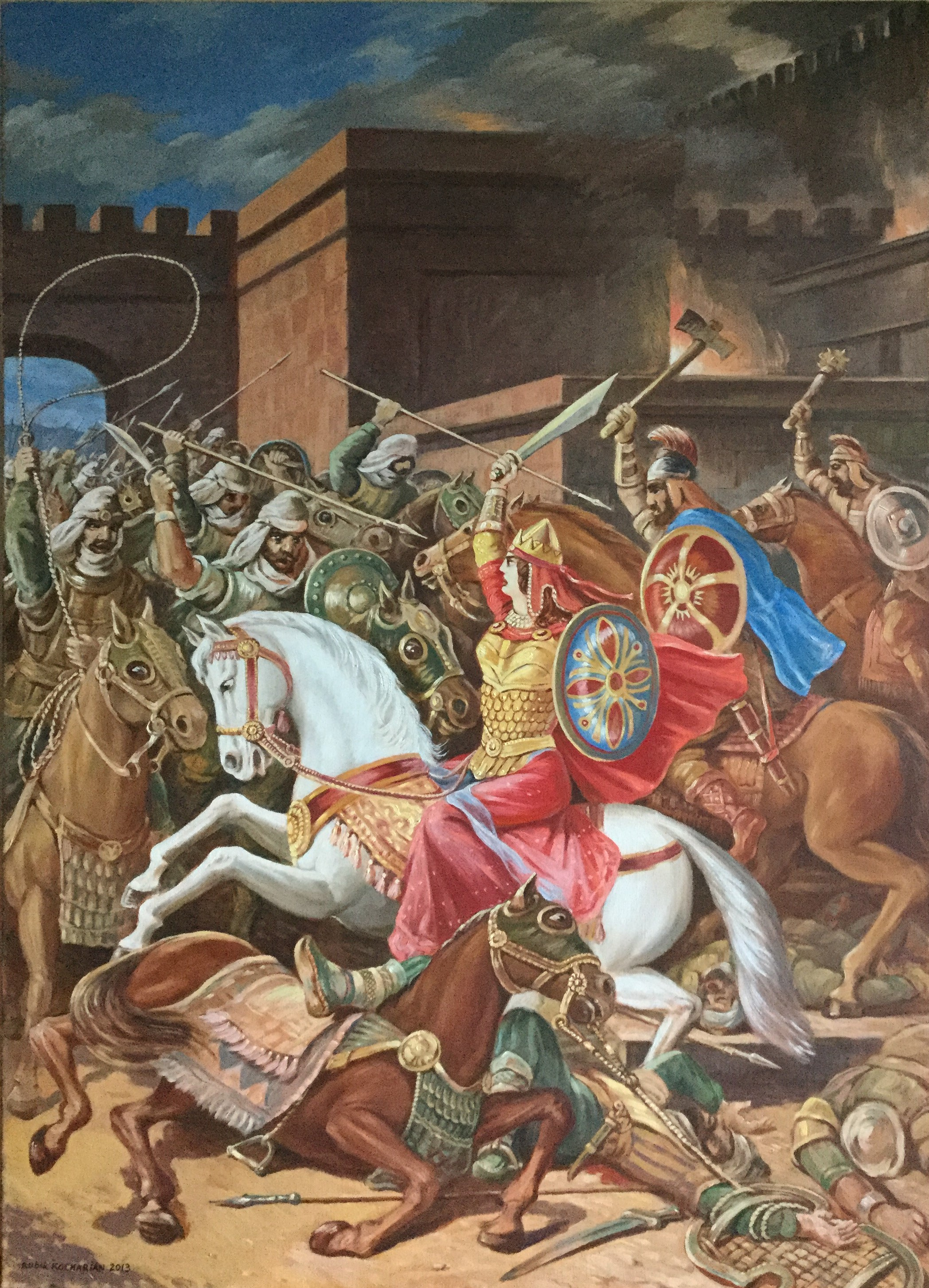
Pharandzem
- 306–307 – As military commander for the Emperor of China, Li Xiu took her father's place and defeated a rebellion.
- 315 – Xun Guan famously led a group of soldiers into battle at the age of thirteen. As daughter of the governor of Xiangyang she is said to have broken through enemy lines to assemble reinforcements and prevent the city of Wancheng from being invaded.
- 368–370 – Queen Pharandzem defended the fort Artogeressa against the Persian army of Shapur II.
- 375 – The Arab Queen Mavia led troops against the Romans.
- 378 – Roman Empress Albia Dominica organized her people in defense against the invading Goths after her husband had died in battle.
- 4th–6th centuries: Possible time period that the legendary woman warrior Hua Mulan may have lived.

=== 5th century ===
- 5th century: Princess Sela acts as a pirate. The Danish historian Saxo Grammaticus described Sela as a "skilled warrior and experienced in roving."
- 450 – A Moche woman was buried with two ceremonial war clubs and twenty-eight spear throwers. The South American grave is discovered in 2006, and is the first known grave of a Moche woman to contain weapons.
- 451: Saint Genevieve is credited with averting Attila from Paris by rallying the people in prayer.

== See also ==
- Women in post-classical warfare
- Women in warfare (1500–1699)
- Women in 18th-century warfare
- Timeline of women in 19th century warfare
- Women warriors in literature and culture

Nonfiction Books

- Penelope's Bones by Emily Hauser
