= Siege of Saguntum =

219 BC Carthaginian victory starting the Second Punic War

- Part of the Second Punic War
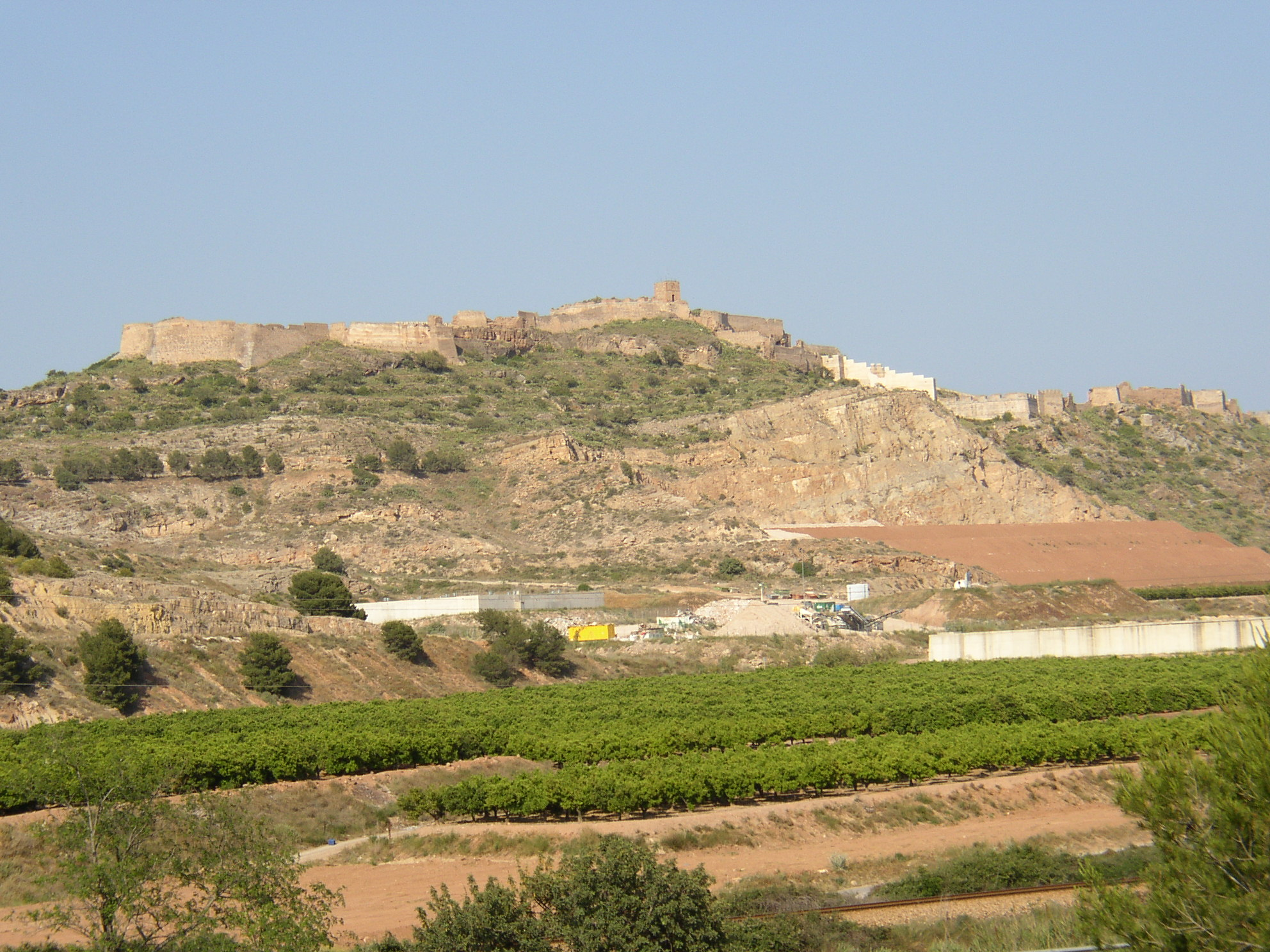
- Medieval castle of Saguntum
Date	219 BC (8 months)
Location	Saguntum, present-day Spain 39°40′33″N 0°16′39″W
Result	Carthaginian victory: Beginning of the Second Punic War

Belligerents
Carthage	Saguntines

Commanders and leaders
Hannibal (WIA); Maharbal	Unknown

Strength
Unknown	Unknown

Casualties and losses
Heavy	Nearly the whole fighting force was killed A number of civilian casualties

The siege of Saguntum took place in 219 BC between the Carthaginians and the Saguntines at the town of Saguntum, near the modern town of Sagunto in the province of Valencia, Spain. The battle is mainly remembered today because it triggered one of the most important wars of antiquity, the Second Punic War.

== Hannibal's plans ==
After Hannibal was made supreme commander of Iberia (221 BC) at the age of 26, he spent two years refining his plans and completing his preparations to secure power in the Mediterranean area. The Romans did nothing against him though they received ample warning of Hannibal's preparations. The Romans even went so far as turning their attention to the Illyrians who had begun to revolt. Because of this, the Romans did not react when news reached them that Hannibal was besieging Saguntum. The capture of Saguntum was essential to Hannibal's plan. The city was one of the most fortified in the area and it would have been a poor move to leave such a stronghold in the hands of the enemy. Hannibal was also looking for plunder to pay his mercenaries, who were mostly from Africa and the Iberian Peninsula. Finally, the money could be spent on dealing with his political opponents in Carthage.

== Siege ==
Hannibal Captures Saguntum, 219 BC

During Hannibal's assault on Saguntum, he suffered some losses due to the extensive fortifications and the tenacity of the defending Saguntines, but his troops stormed and destroyed the city's defenses one at a time. Hannibal was even severely wounded in the thigh by a javelin, and fighting was stopped for a few weeks while he recovered.

The Saguntines sent word to Rome for aid, but none was sent. In 218 BC, after enduring eight months of siege, which is said to have included a harsh famine, with cannibalism rampant as the inhabitants grew desperate. A large funeral pyre was erected into which many threw themselves, fearing what Hannibal's troops might do. Starving soldiers increasingly resorted to suicide with their swords. The Saguntines' last defenses were finally overrun. Hannibal offered to spare the population on condition that they were "willing to depart from Saguntum, unarmed, each with two garments". The offer was refused, and the Saguntines began torching their homes and properties to deny Hannibal their use; for that, he put every single one of them to death.

This marked the beginning of the Second Punic War. Hannibal now had a base of operations from which he could supply his forces with food and extra troops.

== Aftermath ==
Second Punic War:
Selected battles of Hannibal
current battle

After the siege, Hannibal attempted to gain the support of the Carthaginian Senate. The Senate (controlled by a relatively pro-Roman faction led by Hanno the Great) often did not agree with Hannibal's aggressive means of warfare, and never gave complete and unconditional support to him, even when he was on the verge of absolute victory only five miles from Rome. In this episode, however, Hannibal was able to gain limited support which permitted him to move to New Carthage where he gathered his men and informed them of his ambitious intentions. Hannibal briefly undertook a religious pilgrimage before beginning his march toward the Pyrenees, the Alps, and Rome itself. The next phase of the war was marked by extraordinary Carthaginian victories at Trebia, Lake Trasimene, and the Battle of Cannae.

== Legacy ==
At the end of the 1st century AD the siege of Saguntum was described in much detail by the Latin author Silius Italicus in his epic poem Punica. In his verses several Saguntine leaders and heroes stand out (Sicoris, Murrus, Theron), as well as a Libyan warrior princess fighting for Carthage (Asbyte), but very few historians give the tale any credit as a historical source.

In 1727 the English dramatist Philip Frowde wrote a tragedy entitled The Fall of Saguntum which was based on Silius' poem.

The death metal band Ex Deo has a song called "Hispania (The Siege of Saguntum)" on their album The Immortal Wars.

== See also ==
- Alorcus
