= Epipole =

Epipole may refer to:

- Epipole of Carystus, a woman participant in the Trojan War
- In Greek mythology, an epithet of Demeter at Lacedaemon. (Hesychius s. v. Epipolla)
- The image points in epipolar geometry
