= Asbyte =

Libyan princess

- Asbyte, Asbite
- Born: Garamantes
- Died: Saguntum
- Military career
- Allegiance: Carthage
- Service years: 219 BC
- Conflicts: Second Punic War

Asbyte (died 219 BC) was a Libyan princess in the Carthaginian army before the Second Punic War, according to Silius Italicus's poem Punica.

The existence of Asbyte is doubted of, considering Silius's evident interest in embellishing his tale with epic heroes and duels, and has been thought instead as a reference to the Amazon Penthesilea and the Roman heroine Camilla. However, her character is rooted on a real tradition of warrior women in North Africa held by several ancient chroniclers, lending her a degree of veracity. Herodotus spoke about the Ausean and Machlye tribes of Libya, which hosted martial tournaments between young girls and loathed those who died at them, and the Zaueces, whose war chariots were driven by women. Diodorus also believed the mythical Amazons had lived in Libya before moving to the Black Sea. Finally, Asbyte's very name seems to be a reference to the Asbytheans, known as great charioteers according to Herodotus and Pliny.

Asbyte is introduced in the poem as a princess of the Marmarica and an ally to Hannibal during the Siege of Saguntum. She is described as a follower of the goddess Diana who enjoyed hunting, riding horses and warring with rival Libyan tribes, who led an entire contingent of Libyan horsewomen and female war charioteers, though not all virgins like her. She is a daughter of the Garamantian Hiarbas. According to the poem, Asbyte's forces were deployed against a sally of the Saguntines, during which they scored multiple deaths with their javelins. A Cretan mercenary archer named Mopsus tried to kill her from the city, but only hit her Nasamonic lieutenant Harpe, which provoked a response in which Mopsus's sons were killed in the walls, driving him to suicide. Afterwards, the priest of Heracles of the city, Theron, gave Asbyte chase, and eventually killed her when she tried to attack him. Theron was then killed by Hannibal's forces, who recovered Asbyte's beheaded corpse and looted chariot.

Asbyte's brother Aquerras is later mentioned among Hannibal's forces in route to Italy, leading his Getuli vassals. He later helps Hannibal to escape from Quintus Fabius Maximus and is finally felled in the Battle of Cannae.

== See also ==
- Berenice II of Egypt
- Hannibal
- Larus
- Pheretima
