= 219th =

219th may refer to:

- 219th Battlefield Surveillance Brigade, a brigade in the US Army National Guard
- 219th Electronics Engineering and Radar Installation Squadron (219th EIS) an Air National Guard squadron in Tulsa, Oklahoma
- 219th Highland Battalion (Nova Scotia), CEF, a unit in the Canadian Expeditionary Force during the First World War
- 219th Street station, a local station on the IRT White Plains Road Line of the New York City Subway
- 219th (Wessex) Field Hospital, a hospital unit of the British Army 1967–1996

== See also ==
- 219 (number)
- 219, the year 219 (CCXIX) of the Julian calendar
- 219 BC
