= 219 (disambiguation) =

219 may refer to:

- 219 (year)
- 219 (number)
- 219 BC
- UFC 219
- 219 Thusnelda
- Area code 219

== See also ==
- 219th (disambiguation)
