= Iarbas =

Mythical African king

- Progenitor of the Numidians; King of Gaetulia
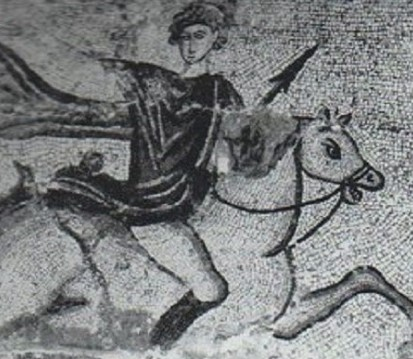
- Mosaic found in North Africa depicting the legendary king of the Getulian Iarbas.
- Reign: c. 9th century BC
- Born: c. 9th century BC
- House: Numidian
- Father: Jupiter-Hammon
- Mother: Garamantian nymph

Iarbas (or Hiarbas) was a legendary Libyan/Berber figure, who was mentioned by the Greek philosopher and historian Plutarch as well as in works by various Roman authors including Ovid and Virgil. The character is possibly based on a real historical king of Numidia.

== Classical tradition ==
In Roman mythology and Libyan mythology, Iarbas was the son of Jupiter-Hammon (Hammon was a North African god associated by the Romans with Jupiter, and known for his oracle) and a Garamantian nymph. Iarbas was said to have led an army across the Libyan desert, however he and his army began suffering from severe thirst. Iarbas implored for the assistance of his father Ammon for aid, the god sent him a ram (the animal of the god) and Iarbas and his army followed the ram to a location, where, the ram struck his hooves to the ground and up sprang a water source, and this is how the Libyans began attributing the animal to Amun (Libyans origin of the cult of ram worship).

Hiarbas is sometimes placed at the origin of the genealogy of the kings of the Kingdom of Numidia.

Iarbas became the king of Getulia.

Later geographical accounts associated Iarbas with Vescerita (Vescera), identified with modern Biskra in Algeria. An 1885 Italian account described Vescerita as a capital and as the residence of King Iarbas. A later historical and geographical study of the Ziban described Vescera (Biskra) as the capital of ancient Gaetulia.

According to Virgil's Aeneid, he was the prince suitor for the Carthaginian queen Dido, Iarbas comments that Carthage is a city of pitiful size and tells Dido how glorious the city could rise from an important marriage with him an infinitely powerful king and a son of Ammon, she however rejected his advances, he then completely drops out of the story after the rejection.

Variations of the story were referred to by Ovid. In Ovid's Heroides, Dido describes Iarbas as one of her suitors, her own people arranged a forced marriage between her and king Iarbas so that Carthage may rise to glory Aeneas would be handing her over as a captive if he should leave her she told him, however Aeneas leaves her bitterly to found Rome and she takes her own life from grief of separation. In Ovid's Fasti, Iarbas and the Numidians take over Dido's land after her suicide, resulting in his capturing her palace.

Macrobius, and Pompeius Trogus also tell versions of the myth; in Justin's epitome of Pompeius he is king of the Muxitani.

Silius Italicus, in his epic poem Punica borrows the name of Hiarbas for one of his characters. Hiarbas is the Gately leader of the Gaetuli, Nasamones and Macae and the father of Asbyte, one of the Carthaginian leaders in the Second Punic War. He traces his ancestry back to Jupiter. He is killed by the Saguntine hero Murrus.

=== First man ===
A Greek poetic fragment preserved in the Refutation of All Heresies records several traditions saying humankind sprang from the earth. According to one of these traditions, the Libyans believed that the first man born this way was called Tarbas (Τάρβαντα). Friedrich Wilhelm Schneidewin, and later scholars such as M. David Litwa think that this refers to Iarbas, though others, such as Theodor Bergk, suggest Garamas is more likely. The Loeb Classical Library translates this part of the poem as:

Libyans say that Iarbas was the first-born, rising from the dry plains to offer first-fruits of the sweet nut of Zeus.

The poem was attributed to Pindar by Schneidewin, and identified as his "Hymn to Zeus Ámmon" by Bergk. In Pauly–Wissowa, Otto Barkowski notes that the phrase "to offer first-fruits of the sweet nut of Zeus" might suggest Iarbas was also the founder of the cult of the gods, echoing his description in the Aeneid, which says he "set up to Jupiter in his broad realms a hundred vast temples, a hundred altars, and had hallowed the wakeful fire, the eternal sentry of the gods. The ground was fat with the blood of beasts and the portals bloomed with varied garlands."

A few translations do not interpret him as making an offering, such as John Henry MacMahon (1868) where he "on emerging from arid plains, commenced eating the sweet acorn of Jupiter", Francis Legge (1921) where he "crept forth from the parched field to pluck Zeus' sweet acorn", and Werner Foerster and R. McL. Wilson (1972) where he "arose from the desert lands, and began upon the sweet acorn of Zeus".

== Later literature ==
Iarbas is briefly referenced in Dante's Purgatorio as owning part of the land south of Italy. Iarbas is also a character in Christopher Marlowe's play Dido, Queen of Carthage.

Silius Italicus, in his epic poem Punica, borrows the name Hiarbas for one of his characters. Hiarbas is the Garamante leader of the Gaetuli, Nasamones, and Macae and the father of Asbytus, one of the Carthaginian leaders of the Second Punic War. He also traces his ancestry back to Jupiter and ends up getting killed by the hero of Saguntum Murrus.

== Archeology ==
An inscription in Lybic found in the region of Guelma, in Algeria, would evoke the name of this king. The inscription is seemingly older than the reign of the king of the same name Hiarbas, hence the attribution
