= C219 =

C219 may refer to:

- Mercedes-Benz CLS-Class (C219), a car
- New York City Subway car C219; a crane car, see List of New York City Subway R-type contracts
- Namco C219; see List of sound chips
- C219, Tasmania, Australia; see List of road routes in Tasmania
- Natimuk–Hamilton Road (C219), Victoria, Australia; see List of road routes in Victoria

== See also ==
- 219 (disambiguation)
- C (disambiguation)
