= Punica (poem) =

Latin epic poem by Silius Italicus (c. 80s AD)

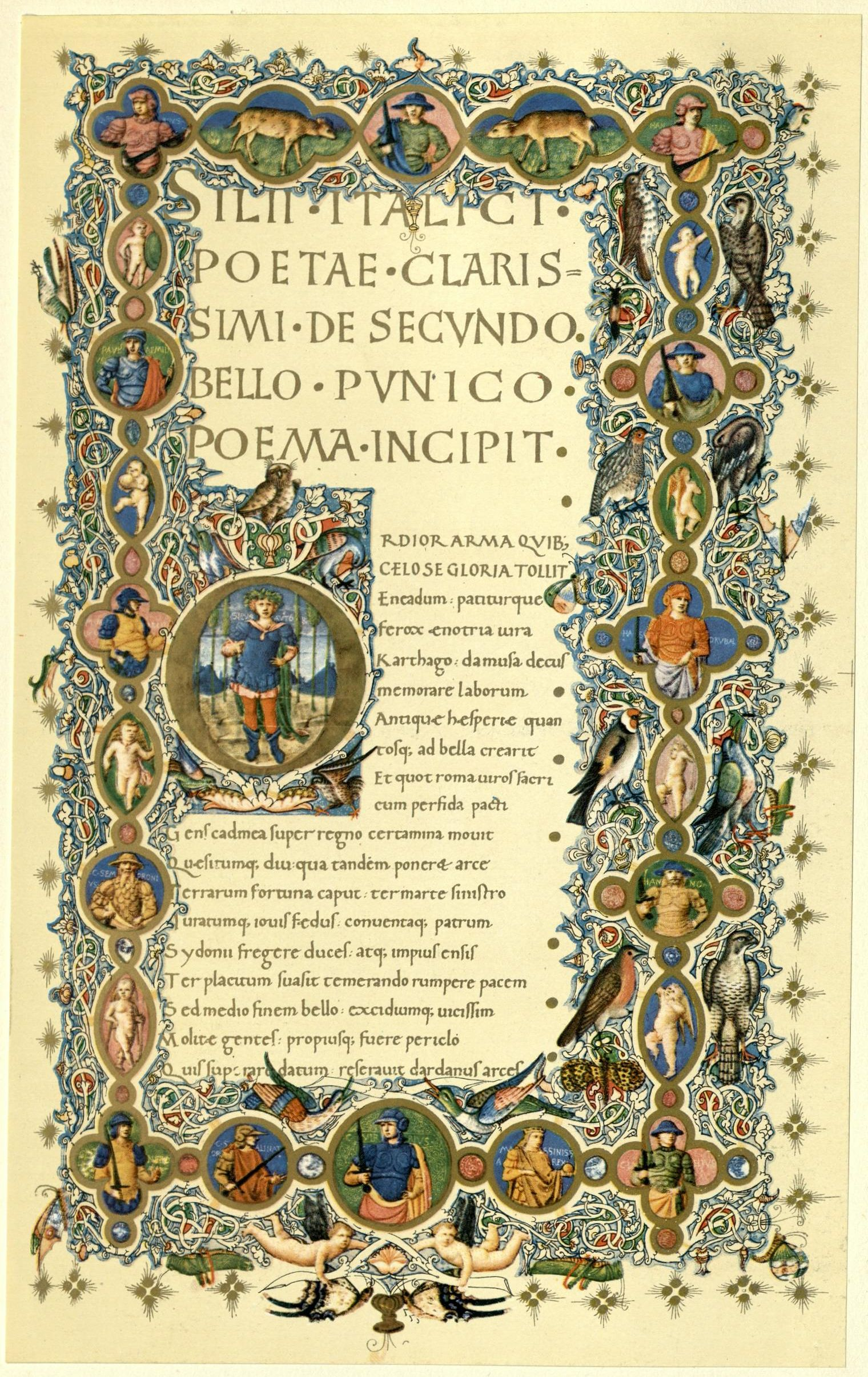
First page of the Punica in the Venice manuscript (15th century)

The Punica is a Latin epic poem in seventeen books in dactylic hexameter written by Silius Italicus (c. 28 – c. 103 AD), comprising some twelve thousand lines (12,202, to be exact, if one includes a probably spurious passage in book 8). It is the longest surviving Latin poem from antiquity. Its theme is the Second Punic War and the conflict between the two great generals Hannibal and Scipio Africanus. The poem was re-discovered in either 1416 or 1417 by the Italian humanist and scholar Poggio Bracciolini.

== Composition ==
The dates of the Punica's composition are not entirely clear. There is external evidence for composition dates from some of the epigrams of Martial. Martial 4.14, a poem dated to 88 AD, describes Silius' work on the Punica, mentioning Scipio and Hannibal as the subjects of the poem. 7.63, dated to 92 AD also describes his work on the poem. Two passages of internal evidence also help date the Punica. At 3.600ff., during Jupiter's prophecy about the future of Rome, significant events are described from the Flavian dynasty and the life of Domitian, such as the death of Vespasian, Titus' destruction of Jerusalem, Domitian's adoption of the title Germanicus (83 AD), and the burning of the Capitoline temple in 69 AD. Thus the passage puts a terminus post quem for Book 3 at 83 AD. At 14.685-88, the mention of a contemporary vir who has brought peace to the world and put a stop to illegal theft has been interpreted as referring to the accession of Nerva in 96 AD, although this reference to Nerva has been disputed. Thus, composition dates for the poem must be set at c. 83 to c. 96 AD, although since those dates do not include the first two or final three books, they must remain approximate. The poem is a work of Silius' old age, and thus his time spent at his Campanian villas collecting antiques and giving recitations, presumably of the Punica. According to the epigrams of Martial cited above, the poem met with some success and was compared with the Aeneid.

== Poetic models and historical sources ==
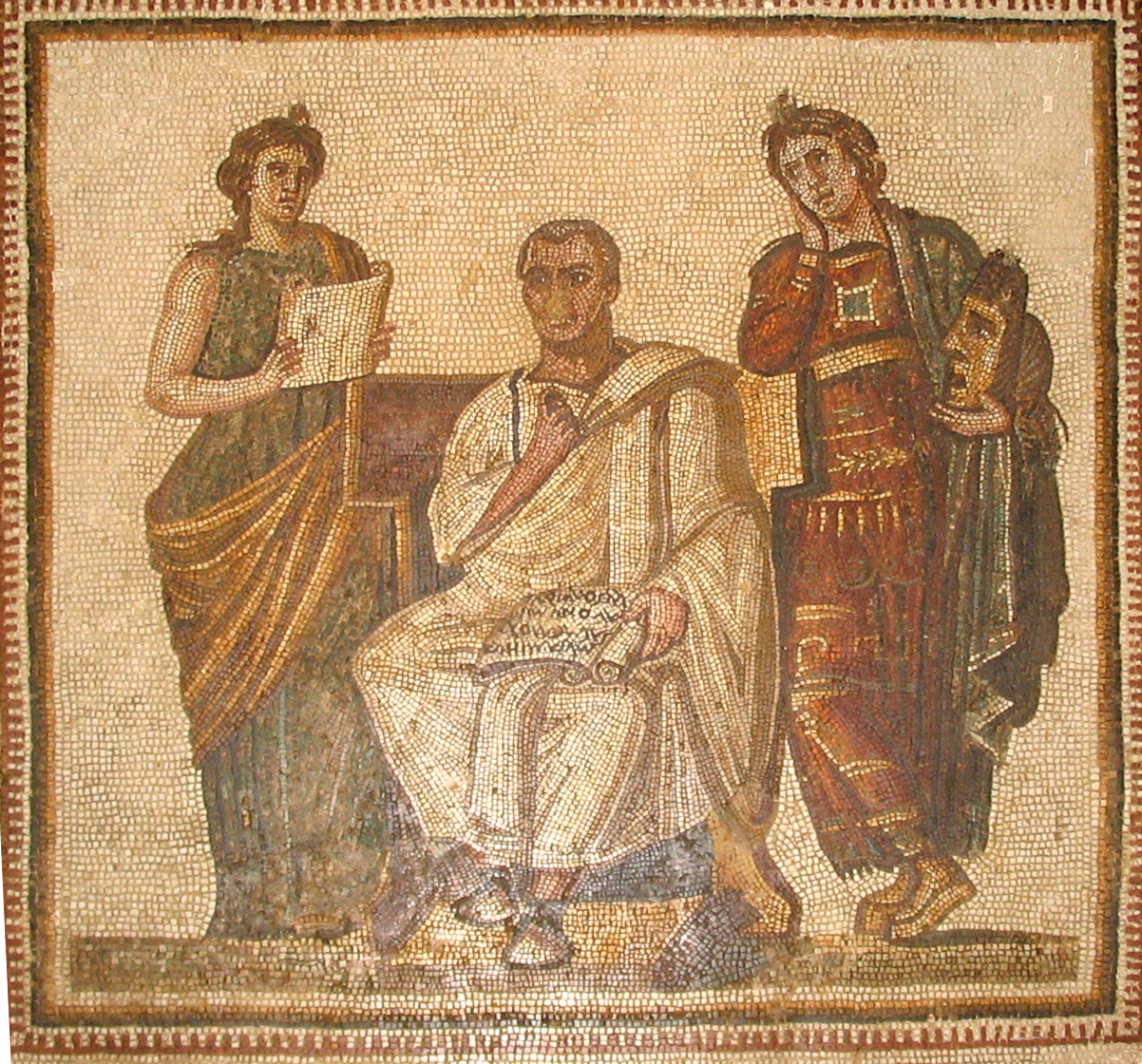
A 3rd century AD depiction of Virgil on a mosaic from Hadrumetum. Virgil was Silius' most important model, and he was personally devoted to Virgil.

Silius, as a poet of historical epic, had to make use of both historical sources and poetic models. Livy is considered his single most important historical source; however, Silius distinguishes his work from Livy's by often embellishing themes which are only briefly treated in Livy and altering the focus of his narrative. It is known that Silius also used other historians as sources. Silius should not be viewed as a simple transmitter of his historical sources, as "Livy in verse", but should be viewed as a poet who, while making use of historians, is not bound by the rules of historiography but rather of poetry.

In choosing a historical subject, the Second Punic War, Silius had many poetic predecessors. From the time of Naevius onwards, every great military struggle in which the Romans had been engaged had found its poet. Naevius' influence cannot be gauged, because of the almost total loss of his poem on the First Punic War. Silius specifically names Virgil, Homer, and Ennius as his epic inspiration. Homer is mentioned at 13.778-797, where Silius has Scipio meet his shade in the underworld. Silius' sybil praises Homer as the preeminent, universal, and divine poet who made Troy, (i.e. Rome) famous in song, saying "his [Homer's] poetry embraced the earth, sea, stars, and shades and he rivaled the Muses in song and Phoebus in glory," to which Scipio replies, "If Fate would allow this poet to sing of Roman deeds, for all the world to hear, how much deeper an impression the same deeds would make upon posterity if Homer sang of them." Ennius is a character in Book 12 of the Punica (12.387-414), where he participates in a battle in Sardinia. Silius says that his account of Ennius' fight is his attempt to "hand down to long ages noble deeds, too little known, of a great man." He describes Ennius' birth, his prowess in war, and has Apollo prophesy his future, saying "he [Ennius] shall be the first to sing of Roman wars in noble verse, exalting their commanders to the skies; he shall teach Helicon to repeat the sound of Roman poetry..."

Virgil is mentioned at 8.593-594, where Silius says of Virgil's hometown Mantua that it was "home of the Muses, raised to the sky by immortal verse, and a match for the lyre of Homer." Indeed, Virgil is considered Silius' most pervasive influence. His contemporaries Pliny and Martial discuss his almost crazed devotion to the spirit of Virgil (whom Silius is known to have worshipped as a god and whose tomb he bought and repaired) and often compare his poetry to the works of Virgil. Silius employs constantly Virgilian images, similes, tropes, and elements (such as his nekyia or the historically themed shield of Hannibal) in the Punica, and hardly a page goes by without some significant allusion to the Aeneid. Finally, Lucan is a significant model for Silius, although Silius differs dramatically from Lucan's historical epic by his use of the divine machinery. Frederick Ahl posits that Silius construed his epic as occupying the historical and poetic midpoint between the Aeneid and the Bellum Civile, forming a trilogy of poems on Roman history. Silius is closest to Lucan in his treatment of historical description, especially geography and battlefields, his focus on the macabre and violence, and his stoic tone.

== Contents ==
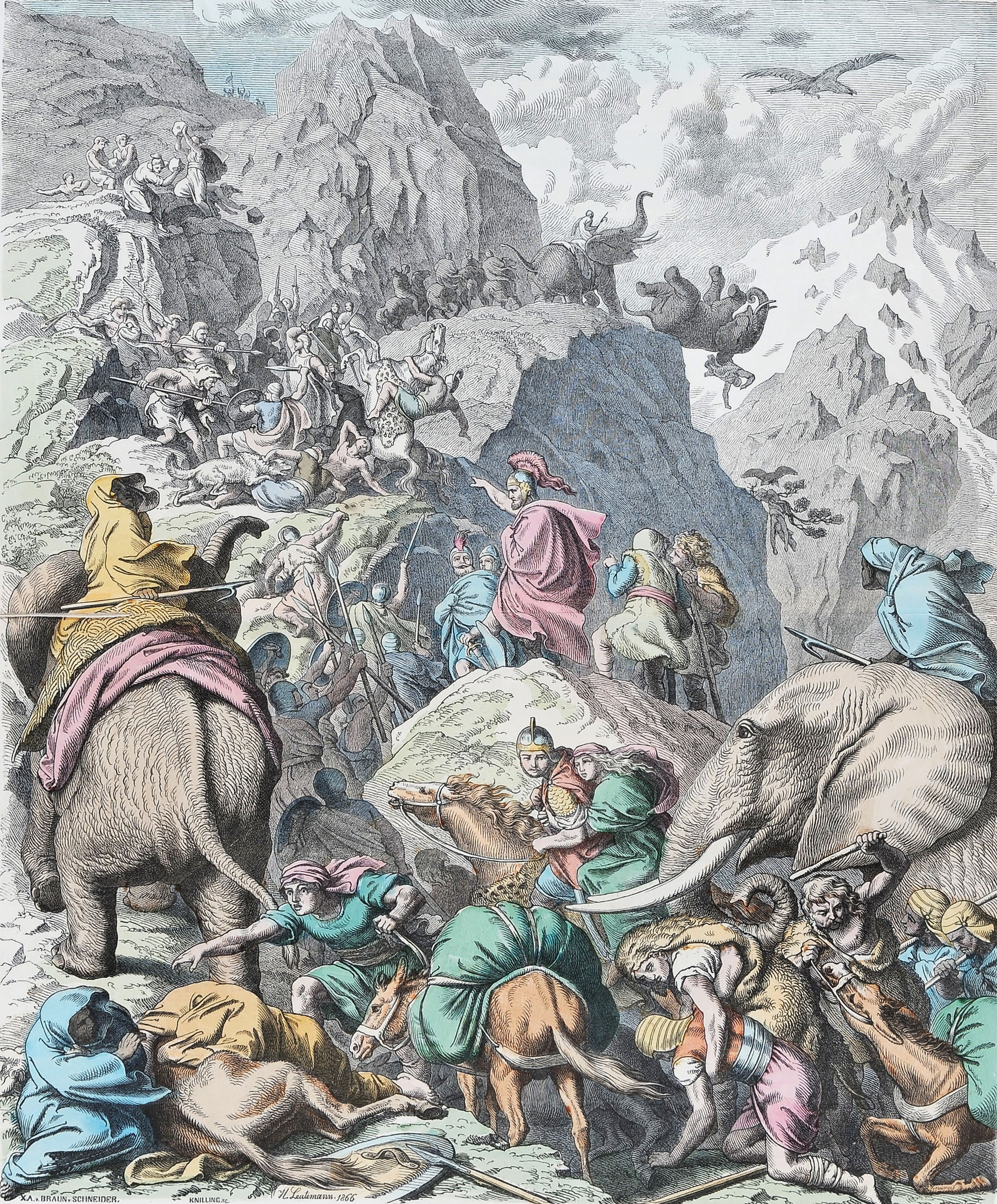
A depiction of Hannibal crossing the Alps, a significant scene in the Punica

Book 1 The poem opens with phrase ordior arma "I set in order the arms", and tells how the poet's theme is the Second Punic War, setting up the conflict as the struggle between the Roman and Carthaginian nations for supremacy. The betrayal of Dido, familiar from the Aeneid, and Juno's anger stir the goddess to prophesy the course of the war and choose Hannibal as her instrument of revenge. The childhood oath of Hannibal to his father Hamilcar at the Dido temple in Carthage is narrated, and his character is described as vicious, cunning, and daring. The priestess of the temple prophesies the war. Hasdrubal is slaughtered by Spanish Gauls in revenge for his crucifixion of their king. Hannibal succeeds him by the army's acclaim and attacks Saguntum, the situation and Rutulian/Zacynthian history of which are described. The siege begins, and Hannibal fights a duel with the Saguntine champion Murrus, who is slain. The Saguntine senate meets, and requests that Rome send envoys to stop the siege.

Book 2 In Book 2, Hannibal dismisses the Roman envoys from Saguntum, and addresses his troops with a threat to Rome. The siege of the city continues and the warrior princess Asbyte is killed by Theron, who is killed by Hannibal and mutilated. At Carthage, Hanno gives a speech calling Hannibal insolent, while Gestar gives a response that suggests Hanno is a Roman sympathizer. While campaigning against Spanish tribes, Hannibal receives a shield as a gift from the Gallaeci that shows Carthaginian history up to the siege of Saguntum. The Saguntines begin to suffer, and a saddened Hercules sends Fides to strengthen and ennoble the Saguntines. Juno sends Tisiphone, who whips the people into a madness that causes them to burn themselves alive. The poet addresses the Saguntines and ensures their immortality.

Book 3 Bostar is sent to consult Jupiter-Ammon about the war. Hannibal visits the shrine of Hercules at Gades, where he admires the doors painted with the god's deeds and the unusual tides of the Atlantic Ocean. He tearfully sends his wife, the brave Imilce, back to Carthage, despite her wish to remain in the camp. Jupiter sends a dream to Hannibal, in which he is led by Mercury into Italy with a destructive snake which symbolizes Hannibal. The poet offers a catalogue of Carthaginian troops. As Hannibal crosses the Pyrenees, their Herculean aetiology is explained. Hannibal crosses the Alps amid hardship, while Venus asks Jupiter whether he plans on destroying Rome. Jupiter says his plan is to test Roman virtus and set the foundations of the Roman empire. He describes the future of Rome, which culminates in the reign of Domitian and a praise of the emperor's poetry. The response from Jupiter Ammon promises glory to Carthage.

Book 4 Fama incites fear and preparation in the Romans, who ready themselves for Hannibal and his vengeance-seeking Gallic troops. Scipio encourages his troops and leads them to the Ticinus river where a bird omen promises that the Carthaginians can rout the Romans for 8 years, but will be overcome eventually by Rome. The Gauls and their hero Crixus stand out in the Battle of Ticinus. Jupiter calls Mars to help the young Scipio after his father is killed, and he withdraws the troops to the river Trebia, where there is a large battle in which the Carthaginians prevail, and the river attacks Scipio until it is burned up by Vulcan. Juno appears as the god of Lake Trasimene and tells Hannibal to march there. Hannibal refuses to allow his son to be sacrificed by lot to the gods, and asks him ever to be an enemy of Rome.

Book 5 The history and mythical aetiology of Lake Trasimene is presented. Hannibal lays a trap for the Romans in a ravine, while an enraged Flamininus goes on a rant against augury, and refuses to heed the terrible sacrificial omens. The poet shudders to describe the battle from which the gods turn their faces away in obedience to fate except for a gleeful Juno. Bellona stirs the Carthaginian lines, while Appius distinguishes himself before dying. Mago is wounded but healed by the snake charmer/physician Synhalus. The Carthaginian hero Sychaeus is slain. The Romans seek refuge in the trees, where they are slaughtered; and there is an earthquake. Ducarius slays Flamininus, who is buried by a heap of Roman dead.

Book 6 The book opens with a description of Bruttius' burial of the legionary eagle to save it from Hannibal. Serranus, a son of Marcus Atilius Regulus, escapes the battle and comes to the humble house of Marus at Perusia. There he is treated by Marus, who tells him the story of Regulus' battle with the Libyan snake at the river Bagradas (Medjerda) which leads the Naiads to demand suffering from Regulus in the future. Marus then tells Serranus about the Spartan Xanthippus in the First Punic War and the use of Regulus as an envoy for Carthage. Marcia, Serranus' mother, asks Regulus not to return, but he, respecting his oath, leaves her and is tortured to death by the Carthaginians. A bloodied Fama reports the battle at Rome, after which Quintus Fabius Maximus Verrucosus Cunctator, whose family history is described, is elected consul. Hannibal sees at Liternum temple doors portraying scenes from the First Punic War; in a rage, he orders the temple burnt.

Book 7 Book 7 opens with an exploration of Fabius' tactics of delay. Hannibal learns from a prisoner the family history of the Fabii and then attempts to incite Fabius to battle as he ravages Campania and the Falernian countryside. The poet, as he says, cannot resist telling the story of Falernus' theoxenia of Bacchus and the gods gift of wine. Hannibal, by sparing Fabius' lands tries to make the dictator suspect but becomes trapped in a defile. By setting a herd of cattle on fire, a diversion is created so the Carthaginians can escape. Fabius called to Rome hands over command to the magister equitum Marcus Minucius Rufus. The Carthaginians land at Cumae, where they frighten the Nereids who go to Phorcys for prophecy. Phorkys tells the story of the Judgment of Paris and the reason for the war. Minucius, given equal powers with Fabius, attacks the Carthaginians and is barely saved by Fabius' force; the armies are reunited at the conclusion.

Book 8 Juno sends the spirit of Anna, the sister of Dido and now the nymph of the river Numicius, to Hannibal who is upset about his forced retreat. Anna tells Juno of Dido's suicide, her flight to Cyrene after Iarbas' invasion, her escape to Italy and Aeneas from Pygmalion's fleet, and her transformation into a river from fear of Lavinia, then hastens to Hannibal and encourages him by prophesying the Battle of Cannae. Varro is elected consul and gives a haughty speech criticizing Fabius, his colleague, Paulus, reluctantly decides to go to battle. There is a catalogue of Italian soldiers and allies. The book ends with an account of bad omens and an anonymous soldier's grim prophecy.

Book 9 Varro and Paulus argue about tactics, and a son, Satricus, accidentally kills his father, Sulmo, in a night skirmish, an omen of disaster for the Romans at the Battle of Cannae. After addressing their troops, Hannibal and Varro array their soldiers at Cannae. Scipio and Scaevola have their aristeiai, but Mars stirs up a storm that beats the Romans back as the other gods retire from battle. The Romans fight Hannibal's elephants, but Varro and Paulus, after discussing the crisis, are forced from the battlefield.

Book 10 Paulus tries to rally the troops after Juno speaks to him in the guise of Metellus. Juno rouses Hannibal to kill Paulus to give him a glorious death; as he dies, Paulus prophesies the future of the war and sends Lentulus to support Fabius' strategy. Hannibal plans to march on Rome, but Juno sends Sleep and he dreams about Jupiter protecting Rome, so he rejects Mago's plan to march on the city. The Romans gather at Canusium and Metellus proposes to abandon Italy and escape Hannibal; Scipio takes an oath that he will allow no one to leave Italy. The horse of Cloelius attends his dead master and Cinna tells the story of Cloelia. Hannibal buries Paulus and his soldiers as an offering to the gods, while Rumor travels to Rome. Fabius creates a plan of action.

Book 11 A catalogue of the Italians who join Hannibal, followed by a description of Capua. Pacuvius persuades the citizens to ask Rome if one of the consuls can be a Campanian, which is refused. Capua joins Hannibal, but Decius opposes the alliance, defying Hannibal's order that he be arrested. Hannibal speaks to Decius who accuses him of tyranny as he is arrested. The Carthaginians feast and Teuthras sings a theogonic poem. Perolla, Pacuvius' son tries to assassinate Hannibal but Pacuvius stops him. Venus sends a mob of Cupids to shoot the Carthaginians and make them lose their discipline, aided by Teuthras' song on Amphion and Orpheus. Mago reports at Carthage on Cannae, but is attacked by Hanno.

Book 12 The Carthaginians, weakened by Venus, cannot take Greek cities in southern Italy. Campanian nobles tell Hannibal about famous landmarks. The Battle of Nola, in which Pedianus kills Cinyps recovering Paulus' armor, and Hannibal is defeated. The Romans revive their hopes with an oracle from Delphi that promises their victory. On Sicily, the epic poet Ennius fights and kills Hostus. Hannibal takes the lower city of Tarentum and returns to Capua and advances on Rome where Fulvius leads out the troops and Jupiter creates a storm and defends the city from him. Hannibal attacks again, but Jupiter sends Juno to stop him. After he leaves, the Romans run to view his deserted campsite.

Book 13 Hannibal criticizes his troops for failing to take Rome, but Dasius responds with a story about the palladium and how Diomedes gave it to Aeneas when he was founding Lavinium, so a dejected Hannibal sacks the temple of Feronia. Fulvius attacks Capua and wolves kill the deer of Capys, which portends the city's fall. The Capuans resist and the goddess Fides praises loyalty. Virrius burns himself alive and the Capuans admit the Romans; Pan saves the city from burning but Taurea kills himself in defiance of the Romans. Scipio learns that his father and uncle have died in battle which spurs him visit the Underworld. He goes to Cumae where the priestess raises Appius Claudius, who asks for burial (an account of funeral customs follows). The Sibyl's ghost prophesies Scipio's success and discusses the ten gates of the underworld, each associated with a type of death, the ghosts of the wicked and allegories, the tree of evil birds, and the palace of judgment. Scipio speaks to Pomponia, his mother, who tells him that his real father is Jupiter. His father tells him about virtue and warns him about Carthaginians. His uncle describes his own death. Paulus calls for vengeance and hears about his burial. He speaks to Hannibal's father who praises his son. In the throng, Scipio speaks to Alexander who advises him to virtue and swift action. Scipio then meets Homer and asks for a poet of his deeds to match Homer; he then views the Greek heroes and comes to a catalog of Roman women. He sees the souls of Sulla, Marius, and Pompey preparing to ascend and then learns from the Sibyl of Hannibal's fate.

Book 14 This book begins with a new invocation and a long description of Sicily's history and the Syracusan monarchy. Marcellus begins his campaign and Silius adds a catalog of Sicilian allies and cities. Archimedes attacks the Romans with his machines and is praised as he burns the Romans' ships with his mirrors. There is an elaborate sea battle, but Silius describes an outbreak of plague that causes the city to fall. Marcellus looks over the riches of Syracuse, decides to spare the city, and is praised for his clementia.

Book 15 The Senate debates whom to send to Spain. Scipio is eager to go and is visited by Virtue and Pleasure who contend for his allegiance. Persuaded by Virtue he asks for and receives command of the army. After receiving good omens, his fleet lands at Tarraco and in a dream his father's ghost encourages him to take New Carthage, which he does. He sacrifices to the gods and distributes the spoils to his soldiers. Silius relates the war against Philip of Macedon and how Fabius captures Tarentum. Then the Romans receive news that the consuls Marcellus and Crispinus were killed in battle against Hannibal. However, Scipio manages to rout Hasdrubal in Spain. Hasdrubal then crosses the Alps to join his brother in Italy. The personification of Italy warns the consul Claudius Nero in a dream of Hasdrubal's invasion. He joins the other consul Livius and they defeat Hasdrubal at the battle of the Metaurus. Claudius Nero returns and displays to Hannibal his brother's dead on a spike.

Book 16 While Hannibal travels around southern Italy, the Carthaginians are driven out of Spain by Scipio and flee to Carthage. Scipio takes Hanno captive and the army of Hasdrubal, son of Gisgo, is destroyed. Scipio travels to Africa and Masinissa, a Numidian prince, joins the Roman side. Scipio makes a treaty with Syphax, a Numidian king, but it is accompanied by evil omens. Scipio returns to Spain and holds funeral games in honor of his father and uncle. Scipio returns to Rome and is elected consul. Despite Fabius' opposition, he receives permission to cross to Africa and attack Carthage.

Book 17 The image of Cybele is brought from Phrygia to Rome and received in Ostia. Meanwhile, Scipio crosses to Africa and takes Syphax prisoner for breaking his oath to support the Romans. Hasdrubal retreats to Carthage and Hannibal is recalled from Italy. Hannibal's sleep is disturbed by nightmares before receiving the summons to return to Carthage. His departure is delayed by a storm but he lands in Africa and encourages his soldiers despite their retreat from Italy. In the heavens, Juno and Jupiter discuss the fates of Carthage and Hannibal. Juno agrees that she cannot change fate but asks Jupiter to spare Hannibal's life and to let Carthage stay standing. Jupiter agrees but warns that soon another Scipio will come who will destroy Carthage. The Carthaginian and Roman armies then join battle at Zama. The battle rages with Hannibal and Scipio both killing many soldiers. As Scipio searches for Hannibal, Juno fashions a phantom Scipio which she tricks Hannibal into chasing so that he might not face Scipio in battle and die. Hannibal chases the phantom and his horse falls down and dies. Juno, disguised as a shepherd, says she will guide him back to the battle but deceives him again. The Carthaginian army, deprived of their leader, falls apart and Hannibal returns just in time to see his army routed. He flees ignominiously to the mountains with some of his soldiers. Scipio returns to Rome victorious and celebrates a triumph through the city with a long train of captives including Syphax and Hanno along with images of the places he conquered. As Scipio, in purple and gold, rides through Rome in a chariot, Silius compares him to Hercules and declares that it is no lie that he is the son of Jupiter.

== Editions ==
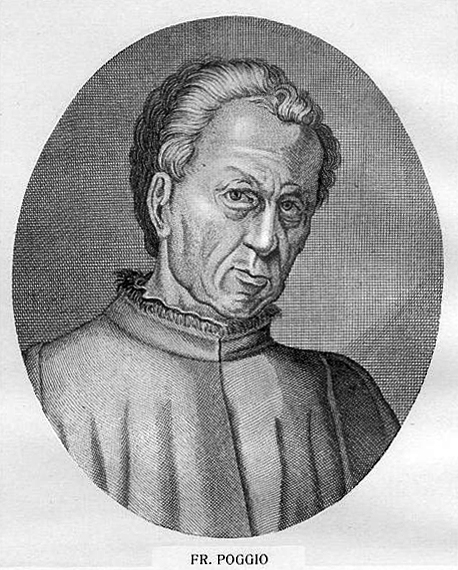
The Punica was rediscovered by Poggio Bracciolini c. 1416–1417.

The poem was discovered in a manuscript, possibly at Constance, by Poggio Bracciolini, in 1416 or 1417; from this now lost manuscript all existing manuscripts, which belong entirely to the 15th century, are derived.

A valuable manuscript of the 8th or 9th century, found at Cologne by L. Carrion in the latter part of the 16th century, disappeared soon after its discovery. Two editiones principes appeared at Rome in 1471; the principal editions since have been those of Heinsius (1600), Drakenborch (1717), Ernesti (Leipzig, 1791) and L. Bauer (1890). The Punica is included in the second edition of the Corpus poetarum Latinorum. A useful variorum edition is that of Lemaître (Paris, 1823). Delz's 1987 edition of the Punica is the current standard text.

In 1927 the Punica was edited, translated, and published in Loeb Classical Editions.

== Commentaries ==
Pietro Marso (1442–1512) published a commentary on the Punica in 1483.

More recent commentaries include Neil Bernstein's commentary on book 2, Uwe Fröhlich's monograph with commentary on book 6, Joy Littlewood's commentaries on books 7 and 10, and Michiel van der Keur's commentary on book 13.

== Monographs ==
Studies of the Punica have flourished with many new monographs published about the poem, for example by Antony Augoustakis, Ray Marks, Claire Stocks and Clara Nüßlein.

== See Also ==
- Africa (Petrarch)
