= Johann Christian Gottlieb Ernesti =

German classical scholar (1756–1802)

Johann Christian Gottlieb Ernesti (1756 in Arnstadt, Thuringia – 5 June 1802 in Kahnsdorf, near Leipzig), was German classical scholar.

From 1774 to 1777 he studied philosophy, philology and theology at the University of Leipzig, where he was a student of his uncle, Johann August Ernesti. In 1782, he was made an associate professor of philosophy at Leipzig; and following the death of his cousin August Wilhelm Ernesti in 1801, was professor of rhetoric for five months. At the university he gave lectures on exegesis of the New Testament and on Greek and Roman writers.

His principal works were:

- Editions of Aesop's Fabulae (1781).
- Edition of the Glossae sacrue of Hesychius (1785).
- Editions of Suda and Favorinus (1786).
- Edition of Silius Italicus' Punica (1791–1792).
- Lexicon Technologiae Graecorum rhetoricae (1795).
- Lexicon technologiae Latinorum rhetoricae (1797).
- Cicero's Geist und Kunst (1799–1802).
