= Alorcus =

3rd-century BC Spanish soldier

Alorcus was a Spaniard who flourished around the 3rd century BC and who served in Hannibal's army, known only from a mention in Livy, followed by other Roman sources. He was a friend of the Saguntines, and went into Saguntum, when the city was reduced to the last extremity, to endeavor to persuade the inhabitants to accept Hannibal's terms.
