= 219th Electronics Engineering and Radar Installation Squadron =

219th EIS
- Active: 1960 – present
- Country: United States
- Branch: Air National Guard
- Role: Electronics Engineering and Radar Installation
- Size: 125
- Part of: Air National Guard/Air Force Space Command
- Garrison/HQ: Tulsa International Airport, Tulsa, Oklahoma
- Motto(s): Carpe Per Diem

The United States Air Force's 219th Electronics Engineering and Radar Installation Squadron (219th EIS) is a communications infrastructure engineering Air National Guard squadron located at Tulsa International Airport in Tulsa, Oklahoma. The mission of the 219th EIS is to support the warfighter by engineering, installing and maintaining global C4 systems. It adds value to the country by responding to national, state and local emergencies. The 219th Radar Section has been crucial during DoD projects involving the Air Force's Over the Horizon Backskatter Radar and Air Force Research Labs projects in New York, Ohio, and Massachusetts.

== Lineage ==
- Constituted as the 11th AACS Installation and Maintenance Squadron and allotted to the Air Force Reserves
- Activated on 18 June 1954
- Redesignated as 11th AACS Engineering and Installation Squadron on 15 July 1958
- Redesignated as 11th GEEIA Squadron on 1 January 1959
- Withdrawn from the Air Force Reserve, allotted to the Air National Guard, and redesignated 219th GEEIA Squadron on 1 October 1960
- Redesignated 219th Electronics Installation Squadron on 1 May 1970
- Redesignated 219th Engineering and Installation Squadron ca. 1 July 1981

=== Assignments ===
- 2472d Air Reserve Flying Center, 18 June 1954
- 2694th Air Reserve Center, 18 July 1958
- Oklahoma Air National Guard, 1 October 1960

=== Gaining Command ===
- Airways and Air Communications Service, 18 June 1954
- Ground Electronics Engineering and Installation Agency, 1 January 1959
- Air Force Communications Service (Later Air Force Communications Command), 1 May 1970
- Air Force Space Command, unknown

=== Stations ===
- Tinker Air Force Base, Oklahoma 18 June 1954
- Will Rogers World Airport, Oklahoma, 1 October 1960
- Tulsa International Airport, Oklahoma, 1982 – Present)
