= Machlyes =

Ancient tribe described by Herodotus

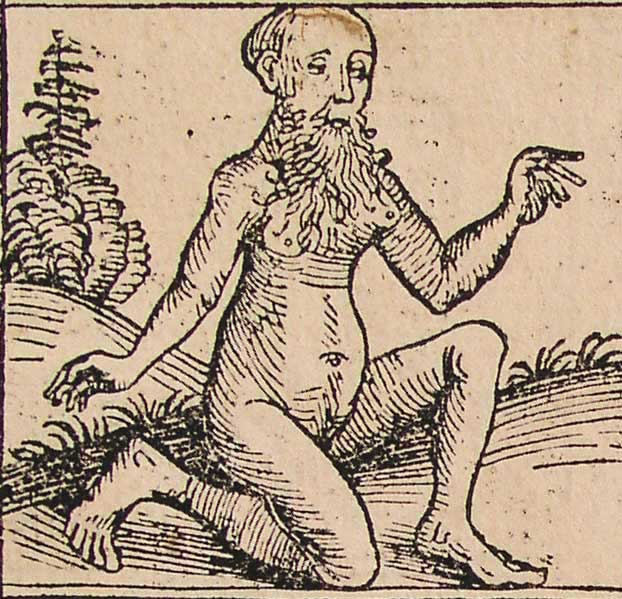
Illustration in the Nuremberg Chronicle (1493)

The Machlyes or Machlyans (Ancient Greek: Μάχλυες) were a legendary ancient Libyan tribe.

== Ancient Sources ==
According to Herodotus, their young women held a ritual battle with sticks and stones annually with neighboring Auseans (Ancient Greek: Αὐσέες). Those who died of their wounds were said to have lied about their virginity.

Pliny the Elder claimed they were hermaphrodites that had a male half and a female half, possibly inspired by the martial practices of the females.

== Later Sources ==
French anthropologist Lucien Bertholon hypothesized that the Maghrawa tribal confederation in North Africa were descendants of the Machlyes.

== In fiction ==
In the book Sweet Shadows by Tera Lynn Childs, the machlyes Achilla saves Gretchen from the merdaemon in the abysses.
