= Epipole (daughter of Trachion) =

Female combatant of the Trojan War

In Greek mythology, Epipole (Ancient Greek: Ἐπιπολή) was a daughter of Trachion, of Carystus in Euboea. In the disguise of a man she went with the Greeks against Troy, but when Palamedes discovered her sex, she was stoned to death by the Greek army.

Her story was related by Ptolemaeus Chennus, as quoted by Photios in his Bibliotheca (cod. 190).
