= 219 BC =

219 BC in various calendars
Gregorian calendar	219 BC; CCXIX BC
Ab urbe condita	535
Ancient Egypt era	XXXIII dynasty, 105
Pharaoh	Ptolemy IV Philopator, 3
Ancient Greek Olympiad (summer)	140th Olympiad, year 2
Assyrian calendar	4532
Balinese saka calendar	N/A
Bengali calendar	−812 – −811
Berber calendar	732
Buddhist calendar	326
Burmese calendar	−856
Byzantine calendar	5290–5291
Chinese calendar	辛巳年 (Metal Snake); 2479 or 2272 — to — 壬午年 (Water Horse); 2480 or 2273
Coptic calendar	−502 – −501
Discordian calendar	948
Ethiopian calendar	−226 – −225
Hebrew calendar	3542–3543
- Hindu calendars
Vikram Samvat	−162 – −161
Shaka Samvat	N/A
Kali Yuga	2882–2883
Holocene calendar	9782
Iranian calendar	840 BP – 839 BP
Islamic calendar	866 BH – 865 BH
Javanese calendar	N/A
Julian calendar	N/A
Korean calendar	2115
Minguo calendar	2130 before ROC 民前2130年
Nanakshahi calendar	−1686
Seleucid era	93/94 AG
Thai solar calendar	324–325
Tibetan calendar	ལྕགས་མོ་སྦྲུལ་ལོ་ (female Iron-Snake) −92 or −473 or −1245 — to — ཆུ་ཕོ་རྟ་ལོ་ (male Water-Horse) −91 or −472 or −1244

Year 219 BC was a year of the pre-Julian Roman calendar. At the time it was known as the Year of the Consulship of Paullus and Salinator (or, less frequently, year 535 Ab urbe condita). The denomination 219 BC for this year has been used since the Early Middle Ages, when the Anno Domini calendar era became the prevalent method in Europe for naming years.

== Events ==
=== By place ===
==== Egypt ====
- Following the defection of one of Ptolemy IV's leading commanders, Egypt's Syrian territories are seriously threatened by Antiochus III, thus initiating the Fourth Syrian War. When the Seleucid ruler captures the important eastern Mediterranean sea ports of Seleucia-in-Pieria, Tyre, and Ptolemais, Ptolemy IV's advisor, Sosibius, and the Ptolemaic court enter into delaying negotiations with the enemy, while the Ptolemaic army is reorganized and intensively drilled.
- The former King of Sparta, Cleomenes III, escapes from his Egyptian prison and, after failing to raise a revolt in Alexandria, takes his own life.

==== Roman Republic ====
- The Romans extend their area of domination around the head of the Adriatic Sea as far as the peninsula of Histria by the conquest of peoples who dwell to the east of the Veneti. Thus, with the exception of Liguria and the upper valley of the Po River, all Italy south of the Alps is brought within the Roman sphere.

==== Iberian Peninsula ====
- Hannibal lays siege to Saguntum thus initiating the Second Punic War between Carthage and Rome. Saguntum is an independent Iberian Peninsula city south of the Ebro River. In the treaty between Rome and Carthage concluded in 226 BC, the Ebro had been set as the northern limit of Carthaginian influence in the Iberian Peninsula. Saguntum is south of the Ebro, but the Romans have "friendship" with the city and regard the Carthaginian attack on it as an act of war. The siege of Saguntum lasts eight months, and in it Hannibal is severely wounded. The Romans, who send envoys to Carthage in protest, demand the surrender of Hannibal.

==== Greece ====
- The Roman Senate sends the consul Lucius Aemilius Paullus to Illyria with an army. On discovering Rome's intent, the Illyrian leader Demetrius of Pharos puts to death those Illyrians who oppose his rule, fortifies Dimale and goes to Pharos. After a seven-day siege by the Roman fleet under Lucius Aemilius Paulus, Dimale is taken by direct assault. From Dimale, the Roman navy heads to Pharos, where the Roman forces rout the Illyrians. Demetrius flees to Macedonia, where he becomes a trusted councilor at the court of King Philip V.
- The Cretan city of Kydonia joins the Aetolian alliance.

==== China ====
- Qin Shi Huang orders his generals to capture present-day Guangdong and Guangxi.

== Deaths ==
- Cleomenes III, Spartan king from 235 BC to 222 BC, who reorganized Sparta's political structure and struggled unsuccessfully to destroy the Achaean League.
