= Silius Italicus =

1st-century AD Roman senator, orator and poet

Tiberius Catius Asconius Silius Italicus (Latin: [ˈsiːlijʊs ɪˈt̪alɪkʊs]; c. 26 – c. 101 AD) was a Roman senator, orator and epic poet of the Silver Age of Latin literature. His surviving work is the 17-book Punica, an epic poem about the Second Punic War and the longest surviving poem in Classical Latin at over 12,000 lines.

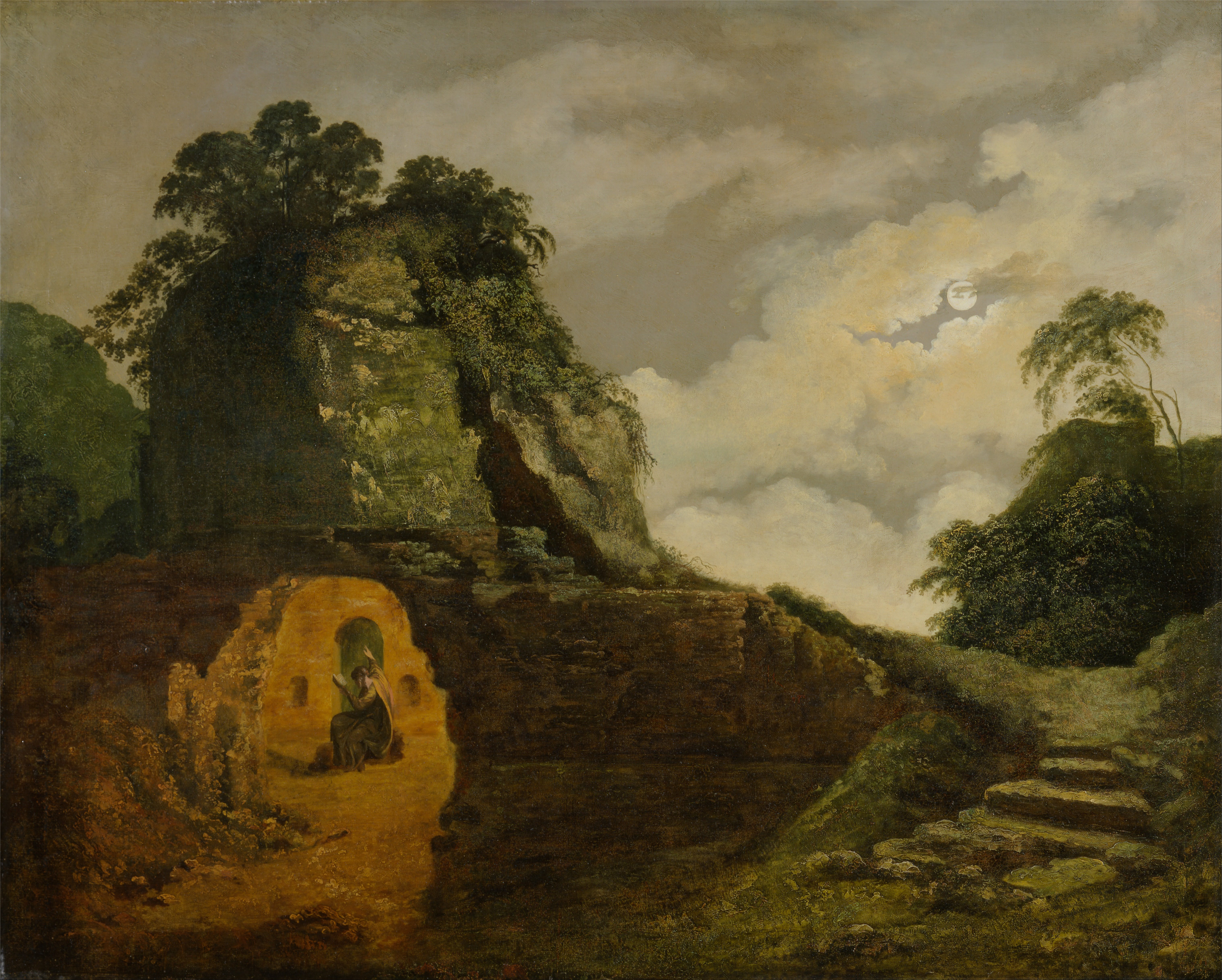
A painting by Joseph Wright of Derby depicting Silius Italicus at the tomb of Virgil.

== Life ==
=== Sources, family and birthplace ===
Silius was the son of a Greek father and a Roman mother; he acknowledges both of them in his writings. The sources for the life of Silius Italicus are primarily Letter 3.7 of Pliny the Younger, which is a description of the poet's life written on the occasion of his suicide, some inscriptions, and several epigrams by the poet Martial. Silius is believed to have been born between AD 23 and 35, but his birthplace has not been securely identified. Italica, in the Roman province of Hispania (modern Spain) was once considered the prime candidate based on his cognomen, Italicus, but if that were the case, Latin usage would have demanded the form Italicensis, and it is highly improbable that Martial would have failed to name him among the literary celebrities of Spain in the latter half of the 1st century. The city of Patavium, Padua in northern Italy has also been suggested by J. D. Campbell, based on both a seeming bias in favor of the region in the Punica and the prevalence of the name Asconius in inscriptions from the region.

=== Political career ===
In early life Silius was a renowned forensic orator, later a safe and cautious politician. Silius was generally believed to have voluntarily and enthusiastically become an informer under Nero, prosecuting in court persons whom the emperor wished condemned. He was consul in the year of Nero's death (AD 68), and afterward became a close friend and ally of the emperor Vitellius, whom he served, according to Pliny, "sapienter et comiter" ("wisely and amicably"). He is mentioned by Tacitus as having been one of two witnesses who were present at the conferences between Vitellius and Flavius Sabinus, the elder brother of Vespasian, when the legions from the East were marching rapidly on the capital. Silius became proconsul of Asia AD 77-78 as attested in an inscription from Aphrodisias which describes his activities in maintaining the institutions of the city. According to Pliny (Ep. 3.7), he performed his duties well and earned himself a place of importance in the empire.

=== Campanian retirement and suicide ===
Despite his wealth and importance in the state, Silius eventually left politics in favor of a leisurely life; after his proconsulship in Asia he seems to have exercised little power and avoided offence. Thus, he outlived the Flavian dynasty without incident.

Pliny depicts him spending time in learned conversation at his villas, writing, passionately collecting books and sculpture, and giving recitations of his works. Silius was evidently writing poems as early as AD 88. It is firmly believed that the Punica was written during this retirement period of Silius' life. Martial 7.63 indicates that some of the Punica had been published by AD 92 and that Silius was no longer making speeches in court. His poem contains several passages relating to the Flavians, and Book 14 has been dated tentatively to after AD 96 based on the poet's treatment of Domitian, who is eulogized both as a warrior and as a singer whose lyre is sweeter than that of Orpheus himself. The poet's attitude to Domitian tends to be laudatory and friendly, employing the full spectrum of Virgilian panegyrical language and imagery. Certain passages towards the end of the poem can be read as referring either to Domitian or to his successor Nerva.

Silius was considered highly educated by contemporaries. The philosopher Epictetus judged him to be the most philosophic spirit among the Romans of his time, and Cornutus, the Stoic, rhetorician and grammarian, dedicated to Silius a commentary upon Virgil. He had two sons, one of whom, Severus, died young. The other, Decianus, went on to become consul. As he aged, he moved permanently to his villas in Campania, not even leaving to attend the accession ceremony of Trajan. Silius idealized and almost worshipped two great Romans of the past, Cicero and Virgil. He purchased Cicero's estate at Tusculum and the tomb of Virgil in Naples, which he restored. Pliny records that Silius especially revered Virgil, celebrating Virgil's birthday more lavishly than his own and treating the poet's tomb as a shrine. His dual interests in composing epic poetry and discussing philosophical questions have been compared to the intellectual efforts of his heroes, Virgil and Cicero, respectively.

Silius was one of the numerous Romans of the early empire who had the courage of their opinions, and carried into perfect practice the theory of suicide developed in Stoicism; Punica 11.186-88 contains a praise of suicide. Stricken by an incurable tumour after the age of 75, he starved himself to death around 101 AD, keeping a cheerful countenance to the end. Pliny remarks that Silius was the last person to die who was consul under Nero.

== Works ==
Whether Silius committed his philosophic dialogues and speeches to writing or not, we cannot say. His only preserved work is his epic poem entitled Punica, about the Second Punic War (218–201 BC) in seventeen books, comprising some twelve thousand lines, making it the longest preserved poem in Latin literature.

=== The Punica ===
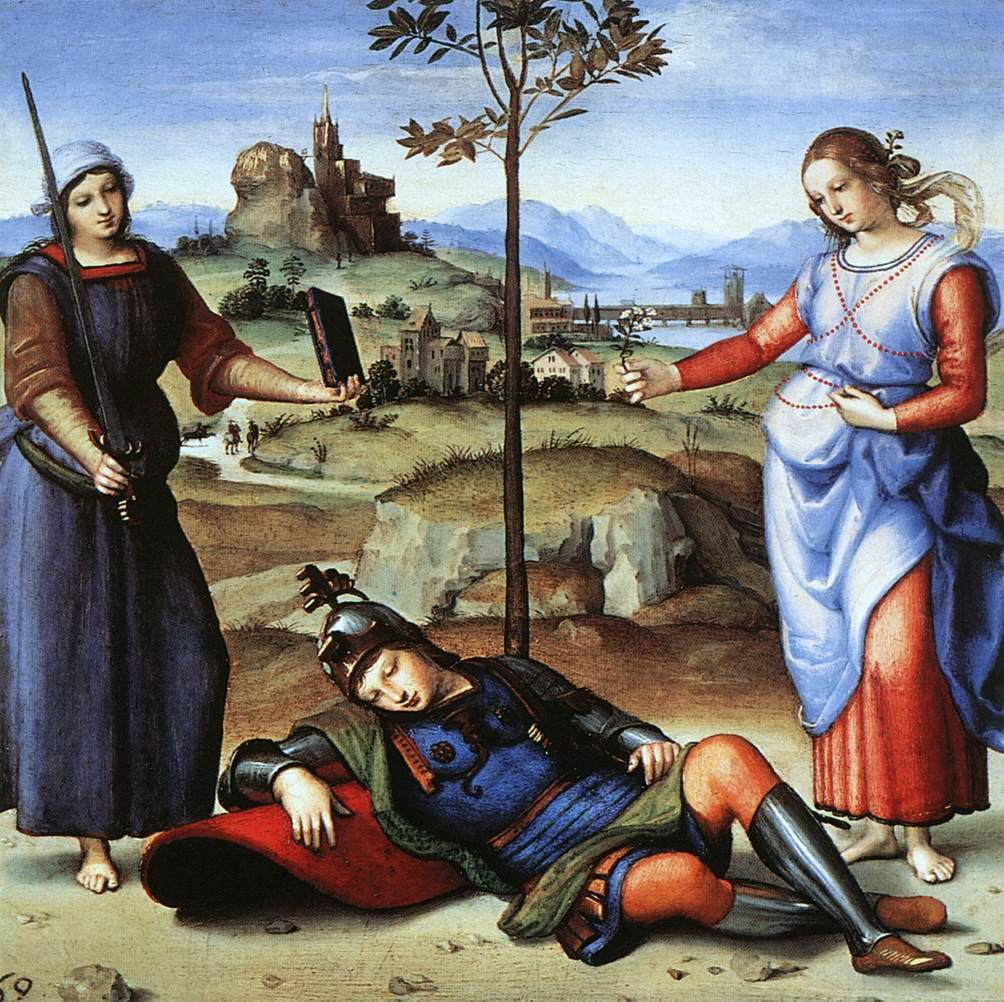
The Vision of a Knight by Raphael is based on an episode in Book 15 of the Punica, the choice of Scipio.

The dating of the Punica has been a difficult issue for classical scholars, but two passages, 3.594 and 14.680ff., along with several poems of Martial cited above, indicate that it was composed sometime between 83 and 101, with Book 3 being dated to AD 84 and Book 14 around AD 96. Other books cannot be dated with any precision. The poem is divided into 17 books and is composed in dactylic hexameter. It has been thought that the poem was initially planned in hexads and that the original intent was to round off the composition in 18 books.

The poem takes Virgil as its primary stylistic and dramatic inspiration throughout; from its opening, the Punica is configured as the continuation of Juno's grudge against Rome developed in the Aeneid. Livy and Ennius are important sources for historical and poetic information, and Homer specifically is declared an important model by Silius who remarks of him at 12.788-9, "his [Homer's] poetry embraced the earth, sea, stars, and shades and he rivalled the Muses in song and Phoebus in glory." Lucan is also an important model for the writing of historical epic, geographical excursus, and Stoic tone, although Silius' approach toward the gods is much more traditional.

The poem opens with a discussion of Juno's wrath against Rome on account of Aeneas' treatment of Dido and of Hannibal's character and upbringing. Hannibal attacks Saguntum and receives a Roman embassy. In Book 2, the Roman legation is heard at Carthage, but Hannibal takes the city after the defenders heroically commit suicide. The Carthaginians are catalogued, Hannibal crosses the Alps, and Jupiter reveals that the Punic War is a test of Roman manliness in Book 3. In 4 and 5 the Romans suffer defeat at Ticinus, Trebia, and Lake Trasimene. Book 6 looks back to the exploits of Marcus Atilius Regulus in the First Punic War, while Book 7 describes Fabius Verrucosus's delaying strategy. Books 8-10 describe in vivid detail the battle of Cannae; Juno prevents Hannibal from marching on Rome. In Book 11, Hannibal's army winters in Capua, where Venus enfeebles them with luxury. Hannibal is defeated at Nola in 12, emboldening the Romans. He makes an attempt on the city, but Juno stops him, revealing that the gods are against him. Book 13 reports the Romans' invasion of Capua and the death of two Scipios, which leads to Scipio Africanus' journey to the underworld (nekyia), his meeting with famous dead heroes, and a prophecy by the Sibyl of Hannibal's defeat. In 14 the Marcellus' successful Sicilian campaign and the siege-craft of Archimedes are described. In 15, Scipio, choosing Virtue over Vice, has a successful campaign in Spain, while at the Battle of the Metaurus, Hannibal's brother is killed. 16 describes the alliance between Rome and Masinissa and Scipio's crossing into Africa, while 17 describes the bringing of the statue of Cybele to Rome, Hannibal's stormy crossing into Africa, Juno's appeal to Jupiter for the life of Hannibal, and the Battle of Zama. The poem ends with Scipio's triumphal return to Rome.

Silius' style is unlike Virgil in that he does not focus on a few central characters but divides his action up between many significant heroes. This encourages him to present important events from the Roman past as a reflection on the characters and their actions in the poem's present, echoing the Roman tradition of using exempla. While many important set pieces of epic are included, such as elaborated similes, ekphrases of objects, such as Hannibal's shield in 2.391-456, a nekyia, and divine participation in and prophecy of events, there are also important elements of historiography such as paired contrasting speeches and detailed geographical description. Allegory is particularly important in Silius, and he includes such figures as Fides, faith, in Book 2, Italia in 15, and Virtus and Voluptas also in Book 15, continuing a trend towards allegory which was significant in Statius, Silius' contemporary. Silius' metrics and language can be closely compared to Virgilian usage, especially his use of spondees. Stoicism and stoic ethical thought are significant themes in the Punica. The war is configured as a trial of Roman virtus which must be overcome with hard work, akin to the Stoic ideal of overcoming adversity with inner courage and trial. The "choice of Hercules", a favorite Stoic parable, is given to Scipio in Book 15, and everywhere the war brings out moral lessons and discussions of Stoic concepts like emotion, reason, and destiny.

== Influence ==
The only ancient authors to refer to Silius are Martial, Pliny, and Sidonius Apollinaris. Pliny's judgment that Silius wrote poetry maiore cura quam ingenio (with more eagerness than genius) has encouraged the view that Silius is a talented but mediocre and uninspired poet. The poem seems to have been mostly unknown in the Middle Ages. Petrarch's Africa was composed independently of the Punica, as the manuscript was discovered by Poggio Bracciolini in 1417 at the Abbey of Saint Gall during the Council of Constance.

Julius Caesar Scaliger's harsh opinion of Silius damaged his reputation. Many authors were familiar with Silius' work, such as Montaigne, Milton, Dryden (who considered him better than Lucan), Gibbon, and Alexander Pope. Joseph Addison particularly includes many quotations of Silius in his Dialogue on Medals as does Thomas Macaulay in his works.

Interest in Silius mostly vanished in the 19th century. As for visual arts, Raphael's Vision of the Knight is a treatment of Silius' choice of Scipio.

Political offices
Preceded by Appius Annius Gallus; Lucius Verulanus Severus as suffect consuls	Roman consul 68; With: Publius Galerius Trachalus	Succeeded by Nero V Gaius Luccius Telesinus as suffect consuls
