= List of archaeologically attested women from the ancient Mediterranean region =

The following list features women from the ancient Mediterranean region and adjacent areas who are attested primarily through archaeological evidence. They are notable either as individuals or because the archaeological data associated with them is considered significant.

== Archaeology and ancient women ==
Archaeological data preserves information about women of different classes and social standings, while also saving details that might not have been preserved in texts. Scholars have noted its importance in revolutionizing our understanding of ancient women and providing new theoretical frameworks for analyzing them, such as gender archaeology. Archaeological projects regularly uncover surprising information about ancient women on subjects as varied as motherhood to the historical inspiration for Amazons.

Archaeological data provides a wide range of information about ancient women. For example, bones reveal aspects of lived experience and family relations. Grave goods and funerary monuments record life histories, social roles, and religious affiliations. Evidence from sanctuaries documents relationships between mortal women and deities. House layouts indicate gendered spatial dynamics and work space. Correspondence and records on papyrus, wood, or clay tablets preserve information about economic histories, social networks, and emotional experience. Poems and hymns showcase women's contribution to ancient literature. Visual culture highlights narratives about women but also the way they are portrayed by male artists. Such archaeological evidence reveals valuable data not just about the individual woman herself, but also about women's history in ancient regions more generally. As many scholars have noted, archaeology provides an important corrective because ancient literary sources often emphasized elite women, were written by male authors, or the women were literary constructs rather than 'real' women.

== Geographical scope and chronology ==
Although ancient women from the wider Mediterranean region have often been analyzed based on their individual cultures, as area-studies has impacted scholarly disciplines, researchers have recognized the wider shared context of the Mediterranean and its adjacent areas. It is now recognized that these various cultures have a connected history in antiquity. This reflects the dynamic cultural interactions resulting from trade and migration, wherein people of various cultures often lived amongst each other or came into contact at ports and emporia, as well as the pressures of warfare and imperialistic projects. As such, it has become common for larger surveys and collections to group together women from the various Mediterranean cultures (including the territories of the Roman empire), Mesopotamia, and the Black Sea, as has been done in this list. For example, Budin & Macintosh Turfa note that dissatisfaction with treatments of the wider region led them to use an area-studies organization in their Women in Antiquity (2016): previous studies of the region's ancient women, they say, "consisted primarily of Greece and Rome, giving exceptionally short shrift to the rest of the ancient world—places like Mesopotamia, Egypt, Israel, Cyprus, Etruria, and the Celts."

The 'ancient' period herein spans the Sumerian and Egyptian periods through Late Antiquity (the pre-Medieval).

== Etruscan ==
Name	Dates	Biography & Archaeological Data
Seianti Hanunia Tlesnasa	2nd century BCE	Seianti Hanunia Tlesnasa was a well-to-do Etruscan woman from near Chiusi, at a time when Chiusi had already come under Roman sway. Seianti's family has been well-documented in the area for multiple generations. She was married to a man named Tlesna ('Tlesnasa'). She also seems to be related to Larthia Seianti, whose sarcophagus is now in the National Archaeological Museum in Florence. Seianti (Hanunia) was buried in a sculpted and painted terracotta sarcophagus, which had been deposited in a rock-cut chamber tomb around 150 BCE. The depiction of the deceased shows her reclining on a couch and wearing elaborate jewelry. She was also buried with silver objects, including a mirror, aryballos (oil vessel), and strigil. Study of Seianti's skeleton has revealed several details about her life experience. She was 5'2", rode frequently, and gave birth at least once. She had several injuries on her right side consistent with a traumatic fall, perhaps from a horse, between the ages of 15–20; she recovered but may have experienced arthritic pain at the site of the injuries. While generally healthy at the time of death, she did have dental problems and halitosis. She died around age 50–60. Seianti's sarcophagus and skeleton are housed in the British Museum. She and her sarcophagus have also been the subject of an Open University video course series.

== Greek ==
Name	Dates	Biography & Archaeological Data
Aristaineta	3rd century BCE	Aristaineta was a Greek woman from Aetolia who lived in the 3rd century BCE. She dedicated a large monument at the sanctuary of Apollo at Delphi which included her mother, father Timolaos, son Timolaos, and herself. It was especially significant that Aristaineta was Aetolian, as the Aetolian League would have reason to display wealth and glory after their victory over the Gauls in 279 BCE. There was Aetolian intent to expand influence in Delphi, for reasons of political and public image, and the temple had been under Aetolian domain since 262 BCE. Aristaineta's place as a woman is also deeply relevant, as it was indicative of her social and economic power to dedicate such a large monument in her own name with no middle-aged male figure involved, it was a symbol of social status mainly reserved for the male head of the family, and therefore reinforced her position as an honorable woman and mother. The inscription names Aristaineta as the dedicator of the monument with four familial statues at the top to Pythian Apollo, and then lists her father, mother, son, and herself. The monument was Hellenistic in style and consisted of an Ionic double column on a stepped base. It had merit based on quality and style of the sculptures, but also the incredibly large height which would have been around 30 ft. tall, commanding the landscape.
Phanagora	5th century BCE	Phanagora was a known Athenian businesswoman who owned and operated a local kapeleion (tavern) in Athens during the late 5th or early 4th century BCE. In a grave pyre cache, archeologists discovered five lead curse tablets, including one which cursed the tavern operated by Phanagora. The epigraph addressed her with business partner Demetrios, who may be related to her (i.e., husband, son, or brother) and dates to around 400-375 BCE. The curse inscription begins with an invocation of "chthonic" Hekate, Artemis, and Hermes, followed by a line targeting Phanagora's property and possessions and seeking to ruin her life. Mentioning of the workplace may suggest that this curse tablet was written out of commercial rivalry or based upon distasteful tavern activities. The writer binds Phanagora "in blood and ashes," which could be a reference to the Homeric epic, The Odyssey, and perhaps show a change from oral to written curse tradition because the old Attic and Ionic alphabets are interchanged. The tablet also includes a line that may relate to festival cycles that usually last 4 years, and suggests the curse wouldn't loosen during that time period. This single binding curse phrase is used in a similar capacity in other tablets found outside the Athenian Long Walls and demonstrates the importance of private cursing in the late 5th century BCE. The curse tablet cache was excavated in-situ outside the Athenian Long Walls, near classical Xypete, slightly northwest of the harbor port, Piraeus. It was excavated in 2003 by former ΚΣΤ’ Ephorate for Prehistoric and Classical Antiquities in rescue excavations and studied by Yale's Department of Classics and American School of Classic Studies at Athens. The assemblage is stored at Piraeus Archeological Museum.
Rich Athenian Lady	9th century BCE	"The Rich Athenian Lady" was a Greek woman who lived around 850 BCE. Her grave is located in Athens near the Agora and Acropolis, where archaeologists discovered the burials of several upper-class people. She acquired this title from the 81 grave goods found buried with her, made from materials such as gold, glass, and ivory. Her grave stands out because of these exotic items made from precious material and her burial amphora, which is an example of an Early to Middle Geometric belly-handled amphora. The amphora contained her cremated remains. From the charred bones, archaeologists identified parts of her skeleton. Her skull was fairly small, but the presence of her wisdom teeth suggests she was older than 20, while parts of her pubic bone and ribs suggest she died around her 30s. Inside the amphora there were several bones which were not the bones of an adult, although they were originally thought to be animal bones. After further examination, Maria Liston identified the remains as that of a human fetus. This established that she died while pregnant or while giving birth. Early childbirth is a factor that could explain the death of the lady and her fetus.The estimated development of the fetus was around 7 to 8 months before death of the mother occurred.
Royal Sister from Mycenae	17-16th century BCE	Skeleton Γ58 at Mycenae was a woman buried at the time of the 17-16th c. BCE in Grave Circle B. The woman's name was unable to be found. Surrounding her body were an ivory comb and jewelry; the other items were dedicated to the two men also in the shaft grave Γ. When deciphering who was wealthy, researchers often look at what was buried in the tomb along with how the site was constructed. Stelai, vases, stones, and gold are just a few things found in the richer tombs at Mycenae. During the excavation of skeleton Γ58, three stelai were found in this grave along with the ivory comb, weapons, and a wooden chest. The woman buried here has been presumed to be of high status just as the men buried with her. Digging deeper to see how the three were related, researchers took samples of bone from the woman's jaw to discover the she and the man next to her were brother and sister. Researchers deciphered what types of bone structures there were to choose from and depending on how close the grave sites were. They discovered this after testing both samples and learning they both had beaky mandibles.

== Roman ==
Name	Dates	Biography & Archaeological
Vesonia	1st century BCE	Vesonia, a woman from Pompeii, lived during the 1st century BCE. She was the daughter of Publius and was possibly the last member of the prominent Vesonii family. Vesonia was a Roman citizen and patroness of freedman Publius Vesonius Phileros; as such, she most likely helped the man navigate society and helped him with financial support. When Vesonia died, her remains were cremated, placed in a cooking vessel to contain them, and was sealed with a libation pipe installed for offerings. Her burial is just outside the burial plot that Phileros had built and dedicated to himself, her, and his friend Marcus Orfellius Faustus. Although she was buried just outside the plot secured by Phileros, the monument depicts three statues representing Vesonia in the middle and Phileros and Faustus on either side of her. Vesonia is dedicated in Phileros' large grave enclosure because he had probably been owned by her father before she helped free him and helped him become a Roman citizen. It wasn't uncommon for women like Vesonia to be dedicated in a monument built by a former slave as the action was seen as a way of honoring their service. Other than being an important woman in Roman society she is also known for the drama that later occurred at her burial between Phileros and his friend Marcus Orfellius Faustus. Something happened between Phileros and his friend, with Phileros going so far as beheading his friend's statue and covering up his tombs libation pipe and urn with mortar and carved his name on. We know it was Phileros who did this because of a subsequent inscription left on the stelae of the monument he built.
Aurelia Nais	3rd century CE	Aurelia Nais, also known as 'Nais', was a Roman piscatrix (fish seller). According to her funerary inscription, Nais was a freedwoman. Also mentioned on Aurelia's tomb monument were two fellow freedmen by the names of Gaius Aurelius Phileros and Lucius Valerius Secundus. Gaius is listed as Aurelia's patron on her epitaph. Lucius, however, may have been Nais' husband as he originates from a different household. Her tomb marker takes the form of an altar and is dated 3rd century CE. The epitaph displays the companionship between a Roman woman and two Roman men. Gaius and Lucius honor Nais by displaying this on the grave. Aurelia worked in a warehouse called the Horrea Galbae. This warehouse was named the Horrea Galbae after becoming imperial property during the reign of emperor Galba, the era in which Nais lived. Before emperor Galba's reign, the warehouse in which Nais worked had been built and owned by the Sulpicii family. Said building was located near the Aventine Hill in Rome. The warehouse in which Nais worked is mentioned on her tomb inscription. This suggests that Nais worked at this establishment for a prolonged time and was not a traveling merchant, as other Roman businesswomen sometimes were.
Caecinia Bassa	1st century CE	Caecinia Bassa (‘Bassa’) was the daughter of the Roman citizen Sextus Caecinius Bassus. She lived in Rome during the 1st century CE. She died at age 10 and was commemorated with an inscribed epitaph.
Julia Balbilla	1st - 2nd century CE	Julia Balbilla was a Roman poet of eastern Mediterranean descent who toured with the court of Emperor Hadrian. She built a large funerary monument in Athens in honor of her brother, the Philopappos Monument. During a visit to the Egyptian Valley of the Kings with Hadrian, she inscribed three Greek poems on the legs of the Colossi of Memnon.
Maxima	6th century CE	Maxima was a Roman woman alive during the 6th century CE. She lived with her husband for 7 years, 6 months. She died at age 25 and she was buried on June 23 in the consulship of Flavius Probus Junior. She was honored with an inscribed epitaph. Dating to 525 CE, the epitaph indicates she practiced the Christian religion. The epitaph describes her as a 'handmaid of Christ' (ancilla christi), uses the phrase "here rests in peace..." (hic requiescit pace), while also containing the abbreviation plus minus, which was commonly used as a Christian phrase. (This can be seen as a replacement for the phrase, "more or less," as the word, "or" is not in use.) The end of the epitaph contains a list of domestica bona (domestic virtues), describing her as friendly, loyal in all respects, good, and prudent. These types of qualities were found in many Roman inscriptions about women of any class, but these inscriptions may be unreliable in describing Roman women in day-to-day real life. The domestica bona tradition portrays her in an incredibly positive and biased light which does not necessarily depict Maxima's own view of herself. The epitaph's reference to Christianity reflects that religious activity was an essential part of social life in the ancient world. Maxima's inscription was found in Rome outside of Porta Maggiore in 1909.
Phryne	1st -2nd century CE	Phryne was an ancient Roman spinning girl ("quasillaria") who worked, likely as a slave, for a woman named Tertulla. She died at the age of 17 and is commemorated by a columbarium from Africa. The original inscription mentions that she was from Africa, describing her as Africana, a fact which—on account of its word order—appears to have been emphasized for whatever reason. The marble slab containing this inscription is itself 0.177 by 0.212 metres (7.0 in × 8.3 in) in size, and it contains a small circular hole about 0.10 metres (3.9 in) in diameter.
Severa Seleuciane	3rd century CE	Severa Seleuciane was a Christian woman who lived in Rome during the 3rd century CE.

== See also ==
- Women in ancient Egypt
- Women in Etruscan society
- Women in ancient Rome
- List of distinguished Roman women
- Women in ancient warfare
- List of prostitutes and courtesans of antiquity
- List of women in the Bible
- Penelope's Bones non-fiction book by Emily Hauser

== Sources ==
- Ancona, Ronnie and Georgia Tsouvala, eds., New Directions in the Study of Women in the Greco-Roman World. New York: Oxford University Press, 2021
- Babcock, Sidney and Erhan Tamur, eds., She Who Wrote: Enheduanna and Women of Mesopotamia, ca. 3400–2000 BC. New York: Morgan Library and Museum, 2022.
- Bell, Sinclair W. (December 8, 2021), Cline, Lea K.; Elkins, Nathan T. (eds.), "Images and Interpretation of Africans in Roman Art and Social Practice", The Oxford Handbook of Roman Imagery and Iconography, Oxford University Press, p. 0, doi:10.1093/oxfordhb/9780190850326.013.25, ISBN 978-0-19-085032-6
- Bobou, Olympia. "Mothers as Dedicators." In Maternal Conceptions in Classical Literature and Philosophy, edited by Alison Sharrock and Alison Keith, 296–320. University of Toronto Press, 2020.
- Bonfante, Larissa; Nagy, Helen; Collins-Clinton, Jacquelyn (2015). "The Collection of Antiquities of the American Academy in Rome". Memoirs of the American Academy in Rome. Supplementary Volumes. 11. [American Academy in Rome and University of Michigan Press, University of Michigan Press, American Academy in Rome]: iii–388. ISSN 1940-0977.
- Bouscaren, Durrie. "Assyrian Women of Letters." Archaeology, November–December 2023: 40–45.
- Bouwman, Abigail S., Keri A. Brown, A. John N.W. Prag, and Terrance A. Brown. "Kinship between Burials from Grave Circle B at Mycenae Revealed by Ancient DNA Typing." Journal of Archaeological Science 35, no. 9. (2008): 2580–2584.
- van Buren, A. W. (1927). "Inscriptions from Rome". The American Journal of Philology. 48 (1). The Johns Hopkins University Press: 18–28. doi:10.2307/290313. ISSN 0002-9475.
- Bruun, Christer. "Slaves and Freed Slaves." In The Oxford Handbook of Roman Epigraphy, Edited by Christer Brunn and Jonathan Edmondson, 605–626. Oxford: Oxford University Press, 2014.
- Budin, Stephanie and Jean MacIntosh Turfa, eds., Women in Antiquity: Real Women Across the Ancient World. London: Routledge, 2016.
- Caldelli, Maria Letizia. "Women in the Roman World." In The Oxford Handbook of Roman Epigraphy, edited by Christer Bruun and Jonathan Edmondson, 582–604. Oxford: Oxford University Press, 2014.
- Carney, Elizabeth Donnelly and Sabine Müller, eds., The Routledge Companion to Women and Monarchy in the Ancient Mediterranean World. Abingdon: Routledge, 2021.
- Cohen, Edward. "The Athenian businesswomen." In Women in Antiquity: Real Women across the Ancient World, edited by Stephanie Lynn Budin and Jean Macintosh Turfa, 714–725. London: Routledge, 2016
- Cooley, Alison E. The Cambridge Manual of Latin Epigraphy. Cambridge: Cambridge University Press, 2012.
- D’ambra, Eve, Shelia Dillon, and Sharon L. James. "Women on the Bay of Naples." In A Companion to Women in the Ancient World, 400–413. Hoboken: Blackwell Publishing, 2012.
- Duday, Henri, and William Van Andringa. "Archaeology of Memory: About the Forms and the Time of Memory in a Necropolis of Pompeii." Memoirs of the American Academy in Rome. Supplementary Volumes 13 (2017): 73–85.
- Dunn, Jackie, and Bob Dunn. "Pompeii Porta Nocera Tombs. South West Side of via Delle Tombe.Tomb 23OS." https://www.pompeiiinpictures.com/pompeiiinpictures/Tombs/tombs%20nocos%20p8.htm, September 27, 2023.
- Dillon, Sheila. "Portrait Honors for Women in Late Classical and Hellenistic Greece." In The Female Portrait Statue in the Greek World, 9–59. New York: Cambridge University Press, 2010.
- French, Elizabeth. "Mycenae". In the Oxford Handbook of The Bronze Age Aegean, edited by Eric H. Cline, 671–679. Oxford: Oxford University Press, 2009.
- Gordon, Arthur E. Illustrated Introduction to Latin Epigraphy. Los Angeles: University of California Press, 1983.
- Graziadio, Giampaolo. "The Process of Social Stratification at Mycenae in the Shaft Grave Period: A Comparative Examination of the Evidence." American Journal of Archeology 95, no. 3. (1991): 403–440.
- Grzesik, Dominika. "The Power of Space and Memory: The Honorific Statuescape of Delphi." Antichthon 52 (2018): 23–42. https://doi.org/10.1017/ann.2018.6.
- Hamilton, Sue, Ruth Whitehouse, and Katherine Wright, eds., Archaeology and Women: Ancient and Modern Issues. Walnut Creek: Left Coast Press, 2007.
- Hemelrijk, Emily and Greg Woolf, eds., Women and the Roman City in the Latin West. Leiden: Brill, 2013.
- James, Sharon and Sheila Dillon, eds., A Companion to Women in the Ancient World. Malden: Wiley-Blackwell, 2012.
- Kellum, Barbara. "Buying Power: The Public Priestess of Pompeii." In Women’s Lives, Women’s Voices: Roman Material Culture and Female Agency in the Bay of Naples, 67–72. Austin: University of Texas Press, 2021.
- Koloski-Ostrow, Ann Olga and Claire L. Lyons, eds. Naked Truths: Women, Sexuality and Gender in Classical Art and Archaeology. London: Routledge, 1997.
- Lamont, Jessica. "A New Commercial Curse Tablet from Classical Athens." Zeitschrift für Papyrologie und Epigraphik 196 (2015): 159–174.
- Lamont, Jessica. "Crafting Curses in Classical Athens: A New Cache of Hexametric Katadesmoi." Classical Antiquity 40, no. 1 (2021): 76–117.
- Lamont, Jessica and Georgia Boundouraki. "Of curses and cults: private and public ritual in Classical Xypete." In Popular Religion and Ritual in Prehistoric and Ancient Greece and the Eastern Mediterranean, edited by Giorgos Vavouranakis, Konstantinos Kopanias, and Chrysanthos Kanellopoulos, 125–136. Archaeopress, 2018
- Lepetz, Sébastien & Andringa, William. (2011). "Publius Vesonius Phileros vivos monumentum fecit: Investigations in a sector of the Porta Nocera cemetery in Roman Pompeii." In Living Through the Dead: Burial and Commemoration in the Classical World, edited by Maureen Carroll and Jane Rempel, 110–33. Oxford: Oxbow Books, 2011.
- Liston, Maria A., Papadopoulos, John K. "The "Rich Athenian Lady" Was Pregnant: The Anthropology of a Geometric Tomb Reconsidered." Hesperia: The Journal of the American School of Classical Studies at Athens 73, no. 1 (2004): 7-38.
- Longfellow, Brenda. "Female Patrons and Honorific Statues in Pompeii." Memoirs of the American Academy in Rome 59/60 (2014): 81–101.
- Michel, Cécile. Women of Assur and Kanesh: Texts from the Archives of Assyrian Merchants. Atlanta: SBL Press, 2020.
- Middleton, Guy. Women in the Ancient Mediterranean World: From the Palaeolithic to the Byzantines. Cambridge: Cambridge University Press, 2023.
- Morris, Sarah P., Papadopoulos, John K. "Of Granaries and Games: Egyptian Stowaways in an Athenian Chest." Hesperia Supplements 33 (2004): 225–242.
- Raia, A. and J. Sebesta, "The Online Companion" to A. Raia, C. Luschnig, and J. Sebesta, The Worlds of Roman Women: A Latin Reader. Newburyport: Hackett Publishing, 2005, https://feminaeromanae.org/caeciniabassa.html and https://feminaeromanae.org/caeciniabassanotes.html
- Smithson, Evelyn Lord. "The Tomb of a Rich Athenian Lady, CA. 850 B.C." Hesperia: The Journal of the American School of Classical Studies at Athens 37, no. 1 (1968): 77–116.
- Whitley, James. "Women in Early Iron Age and Archaic Greece: A View From the Grave." In Women in Antiquity: Real Women Across the Ancient World, edited by Stephanie Lynn Budin, Jean Macintosh Turfa, 660–672. London: Routledge, 2016.
- Harvey, Brian."Roman Lives: Roman Life as Illustrated by Latin Inscriptions.",135-136. Indiana: Hackett Publishing., 2004.
- Caldelli, Maria Letizia."Women in the Roman World" in the Oxford Handbook of Roman Epigraphy, edited by Christer Bruun and Jonathan Edmundson, 582–604.Oxford University,2015.
- Becker, Hilary. "Roman Women in the Urban Economy" in Women in Antiquity: Real Women across the Ancient World, edited by Stephanie Lynn Budin and Jean Macintosh Turfa,915-931.London: Routledge,2016.
