= Salamis Stone =

The Salamis Stone is an Ancient Greek artifact discovered on the Island of Salamis, depicting an arm, hands, and feet. It is believed to be a conversion table for different measuring systems used in Greek architecture, such as Doric, Ionic, and Common.

The stone's significance has been attributed to its influence on the work of Vitruvius, a Roman architect who documented classical architectural principles. Vitruvius's writings later inspired Leonardo da Vinci's famous drawing, the Vitruvian Man, which embodies the blend of art and science in human proportions. The Salamis Stone thus connects ancient Greek architectural knowledge with Renaissance art and science. The stone is currently situated on display in the Historical Museum of Piraeus.

== History ==
The Salamis Stone was discovered during underwater archaeological excavations in 2022 at Ampelaki Bay, on the eastern shore of the island.
