= 279 =

279 in various calendars
- Gregorian calendar: 279; CCLXXIX
- Ab urbe condita: 1032
- Assyrian calendar: 5029
- Balinese saka calendar: 200–201
- Bengali calendar: −315 – −314
- Berber calendar: 1229
- Buddhist calendar: 823
- Burmese calendar: −359
- Byzantine calendar: 5787–5788
- Chinese calendar: 戊戌年 (Earth Dog); 2976 or 2769 — to — 己亥年 (Earth Pig); 2977 or 2770
- Coptic calendar: −5 – −4
- Discordian calendar: 1445
- Ethiopian calendar: 271–272
- Hebrew calendar: 4039–4040
- Hindu calendars
- Vikram Samvat: 335–336
- Shaka Samvat: 200–201
- Kali Yuga: 3379–3380
- Holocene calendar: 10279
- Iranian calendar: 343 BP – 342 BP
- Islamic calendar: 354 BH – 353 BH
- Javanese calendar: 158–159
- Julian calendar: 279; CCLXXIX
- Korean calendar: 2612
- Minguo calendar: 1633 before ROC 民前1633年
- Nanakshahi calendar: −1189
- Seleucid era: 590/591 AG
- Thai solar calendar: 821–822
- Tibetan calendar: ས་ཕོ་ཁྱི་ལོ་ (male Earth-Dog); 405 or 24 or −748 — to — ས་མོ་ཕག་ལོ་ (female Earth-Boar); 406 or 25 or −747

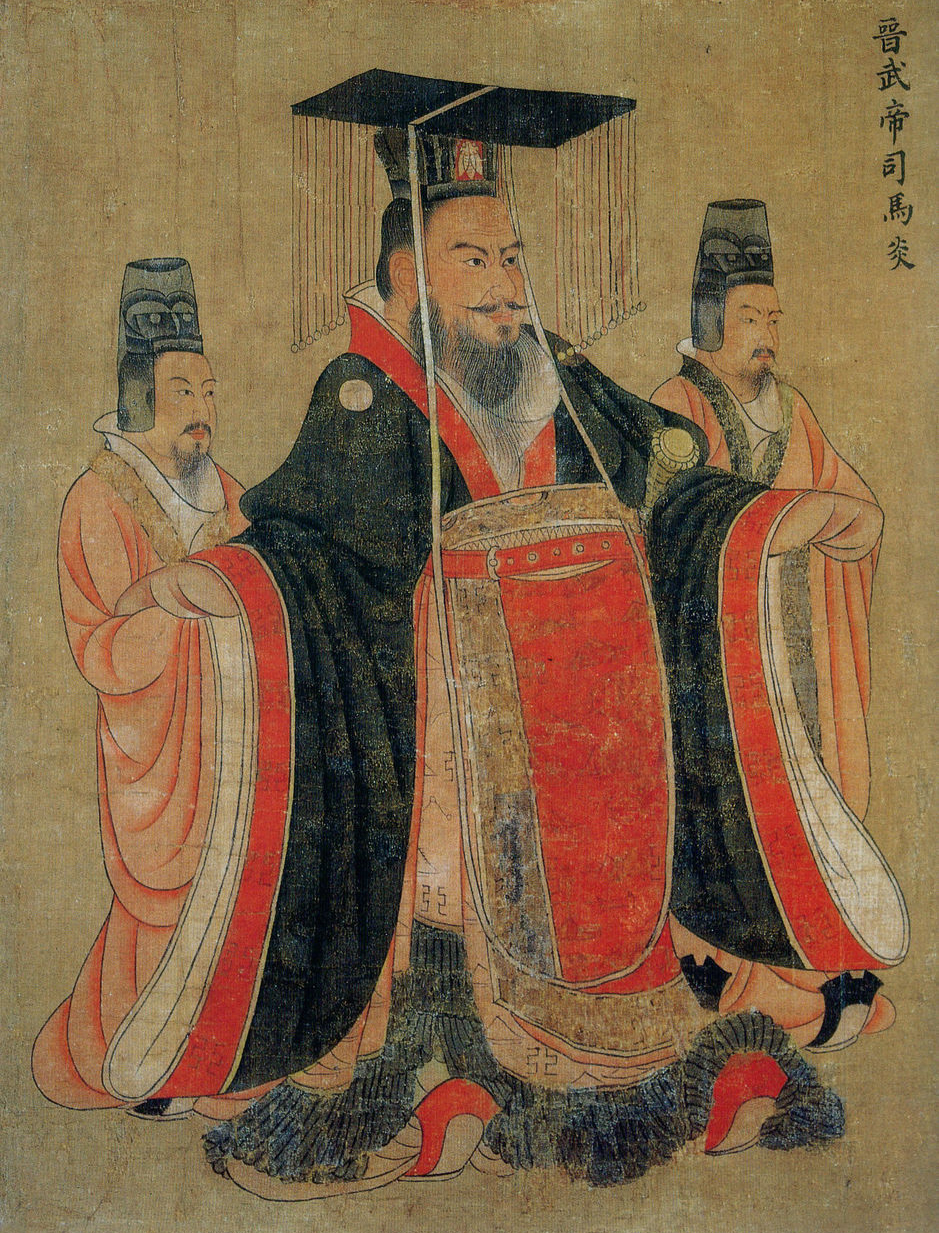
Emperor Sima Yan by Yan Liben

Year 279 (CCLXXIX) was a common year starting on Wednesday of the Julian calendar. At the time, it was known in Rome as the Year of the Consulship of Probus and Paternus (or, less frequently, year 1032 Ab urbe condita). The denomination 279 for this year has been used since the early medieval period, when the Anno Domini calendar era became the prevalent method in Europe for naming years.

== Events ==
=== By place ===
==== Asia ====
- Winter – Conquest of Wu by Jin: The Jin Dynasty conquers Eastern Wu, the last of the three contending powers in China during the Three Kingdoms Period. (Note: The Zizhi Tongjian recorded that the Jin dynasty launched the invasion of Eastern Wu in the 11th month of the 5th year of the Xianning era of Sima Yan's reign. This month corresponds to 21 December 279 to 18 January 280 in the Gregorian calendar.)

== Births ==
- Sima Ying, Chinese prince of the Jin Dynasty (d. 306)

== Deaths ==
- Johanan bar Nappaha, Jewish compiler of the Talmud
- Severa Seleuciane, an ancient Roman woman
- Tiberius Julius Teiranes, Roman prince and client king
- Tufa Shujineng, Chinese chieftain of Jin Dynasty

== Sources ==
- Sima Guang, ed. (1934) [1084]. Zizhi Tongjian. Hong Kong: Zhonghua Shuju.
