= Piraeus Artemis =

Ancient Greek statues

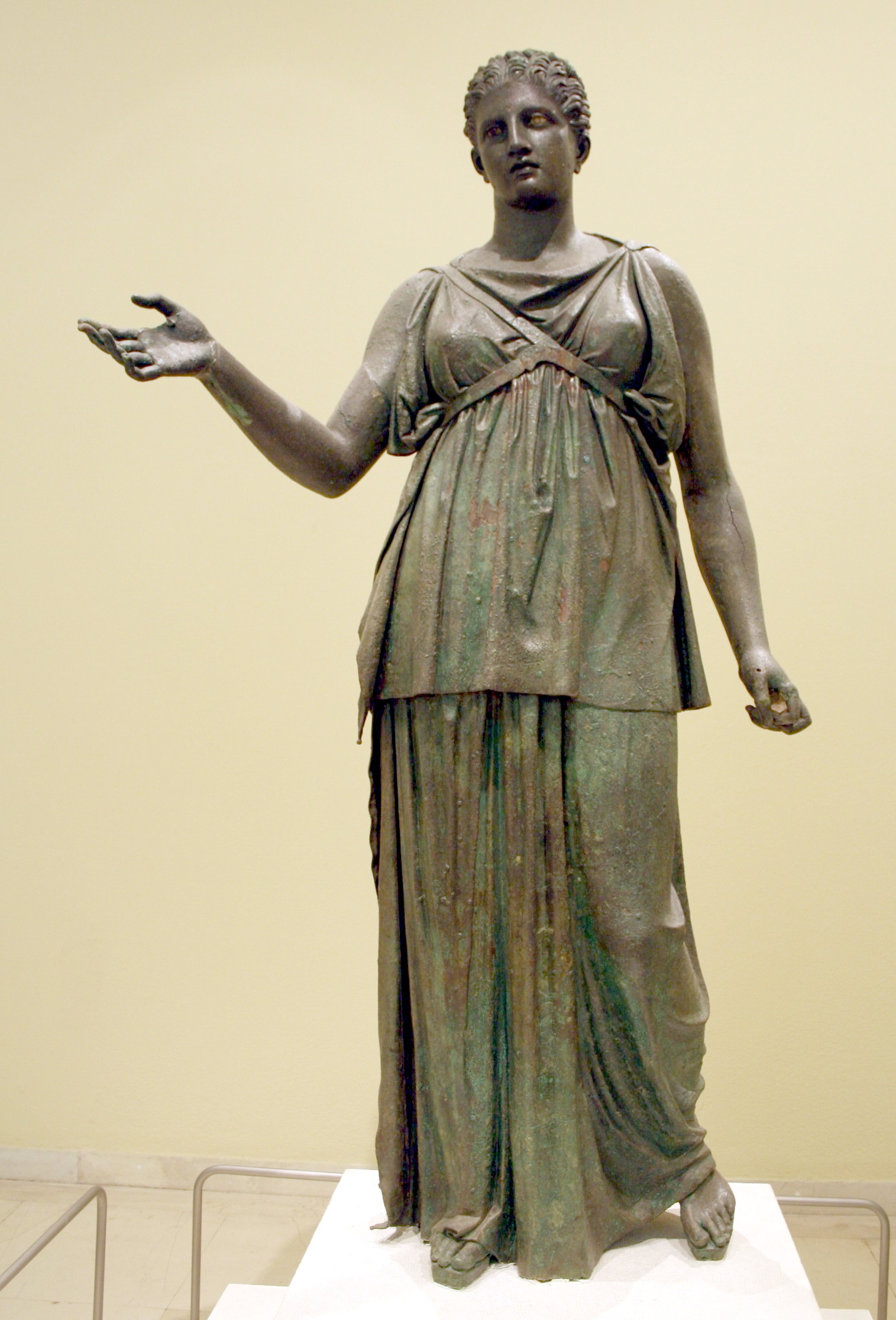
Artemis Piraeus A

Piraeus Artemis refers to two bronze statues of Artemis excavated in Piraeus, Athens in 1959, along with a large theatrical mask (possibly in honor of Dionysus) and three pieces of marble sculptures. Two other statues were found in the buried cache as well: a larger-than-lifesize bronze archaistic Apollo (Piraeus Apollo) ostensibly from late fourth century, and a similarly sized bronze fourth century-style Athena (Piraeus Athena). The second Artemis statue and that of Athena were excavated by John Papadimitriou. All of the statues are now exhibited in the Archaeological Museum of Piraeus in Athens.

Piraeus possessed a primary seaport, Cantharus, and, due to the foreign influence of trade and the mercenary garrison on Munychia hill, the city was also entry point for new cults in Attica. It has been theorized that this cache was a shipment that may have been overtaken when the Roman general, Sulla, sacked Piraeus in 86 BCE. However, since the various statues date from a time span of approximately five centuries, it could not have been shipped on private commission. It is possible that these bronze cult statues all come from one sanctuary that had been dedicated over the centuries before the collection was removed in the first century BCE. The cache could have been transported to Piraeus from almost anywhere, though as there are two representations of Artemis and one of Apollo, it's thought that the cache may be from Delos, the divine twins' birthplace.

Both Artemis statues are thought to be Hellenistic due to the hairstyle and stance, and both show a full-bodied Artemis with a long skirt that covers her legs. While the Artemis A figure is similar to the others in the collection and larger than life, the Artemis B statue is somewhat smaller than life-size.

== Artemis, Goddess of the Hunt ==
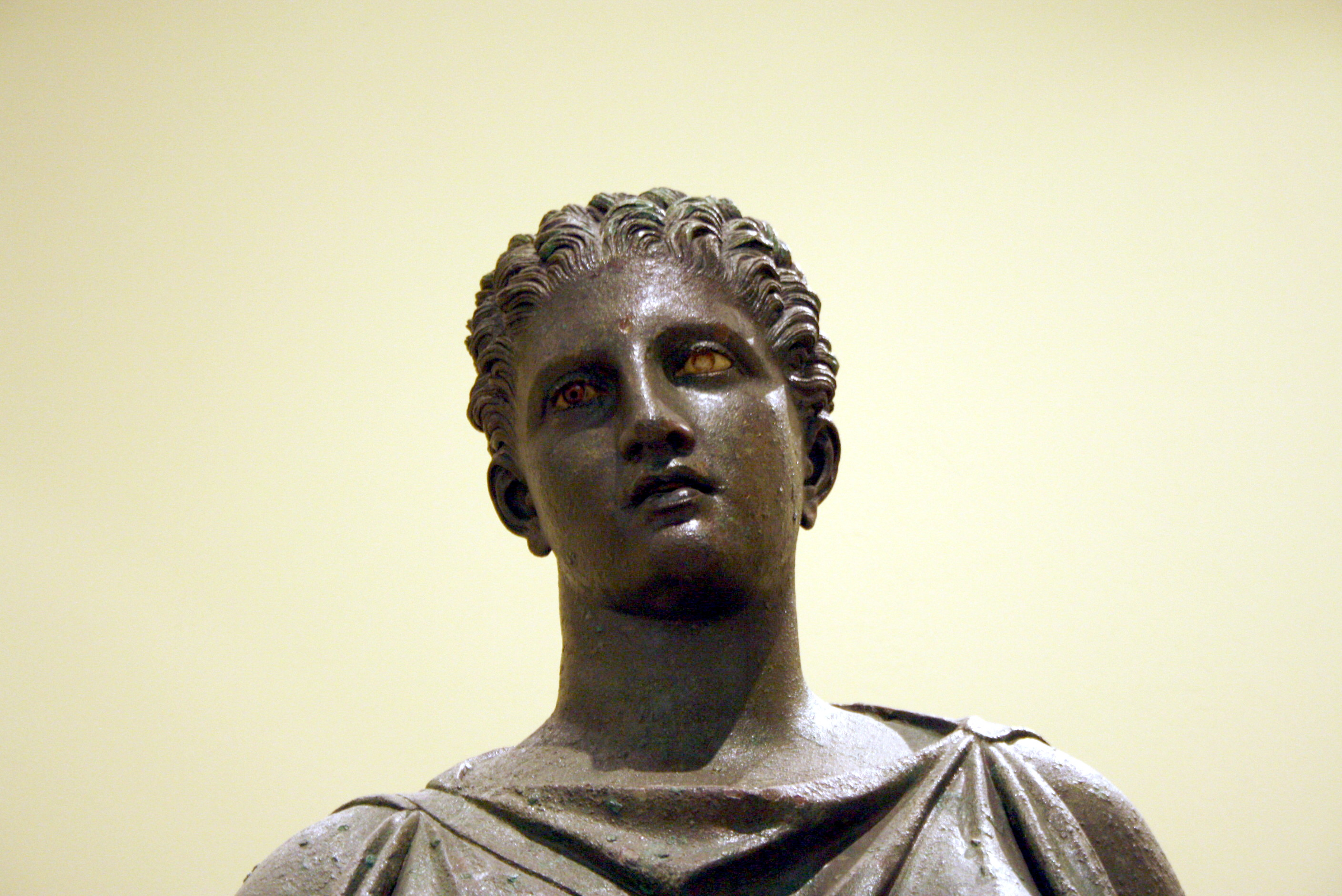
Detail, head of A

Artemis, a virgin goddess who kept away from men and civilization, signifying the wild aspect that was always apparent in Ancient Greek culture, came to be worshipped as a huntress and a sanctifier of solitude.

She was associated with young women and girls and biological maturation, and both Piraeus Artemis statues show the goddess as a curvaceous woman, not a wild young girl. The anger of the goddess was also feared and recounted in legends, and part of the worship consisted of appeasing the goddess. The statues convey this aspect; though in both depictions Artemis's stance is approachable, she carries her weapon, showing her ability to quickly withdraw favor. Often worshipped close to territorial frontiers and a little away from settlements, female worshippers of Artemis were frequently in danger; a necessary aspect that came with worshipping the goddess.

Several theories attempt to explain the placement of Artemis's sanctuaries. M. Jost proposed that the temples on borders are associated with Artemis as a huntress and separating her from the temples in low, marshy areas honoring her as a fertility goddess. However, Frontisi proposed that the location represents the goddess's realm as transitioning between nature and civilization.

The goddess's reputation as not only a protector but a huntress becomes much clearer in fourth-century statuary. Though the two Piraeus Artemises are portrayed in long dresses, it is perfectly clear from her bow and quiver that she is a huntress, while other statues of Artemis depict her in a short or double-belted dress and indicate a more active Artemis.

The goddess was both wild and a peaceful, a key aspect of civilization, and these statues reflect this idea by showing her as strong and womanly, approachable and dangerous, capable of protecting or punishing her worshippers.

== The Piraeus Artemis Statues ==
=== Piraeus Artemis A ===
- Late Classical, second half of the fourth century B.C.E.
- Height: 1.94 meters
- Found: 1959 in Piraeus, currently in the Piraeus museum.

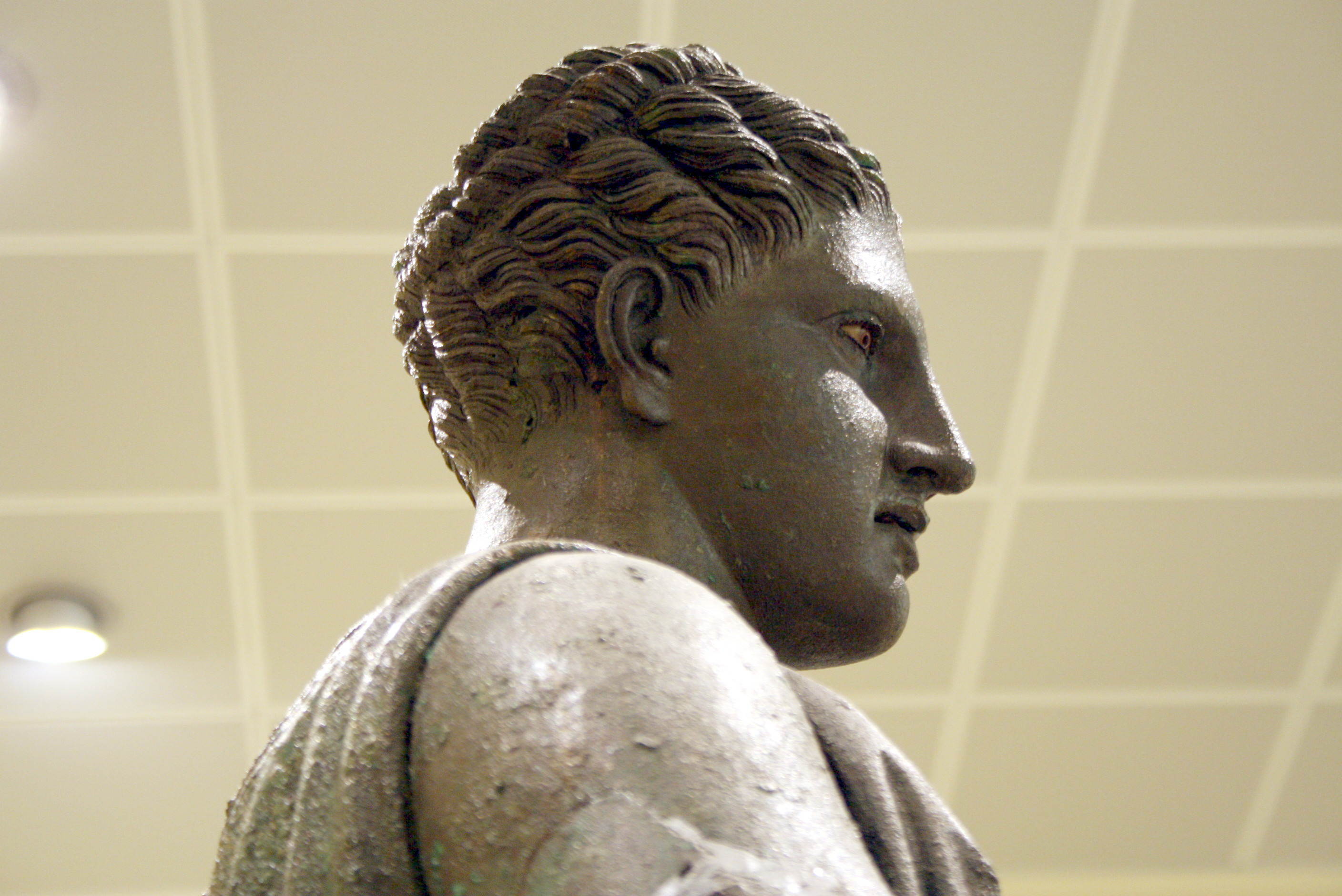
Hellenistic hair style

The taller of the two Artemis statues, a quiver strap runs diagonally over the figure's right shoulder and under her left arm. There is a trace of lead solder on the strap on the statue's back, which shows where the quiver was attached. Her hand still contains a lump of clay that was used to anchor her bow. There are also two small, bronze remnants of a phiale (offering bowl) that she would have held in her upturned right hand. This stance is in fact one of the stances in which Artemis and Apollo were often portrayed in Greek art.

Though the Artemis A's design seems to be derived from an archaic model, there are clear Classical terms with which the artist chose to portray the statue. For example, the figure is shown with a Polyclitan stance, as indicated from most of her weight resting mainly on the right leg, leaving the left leg to bend and step to the side. The arms seem to be able to move independently of the figure's torso, judging by the way her arms are outstretched. Her head tilts to the side as well, leading the Caroline Houser to interpret the stance of the statue as a way of creating an illusion of an animate statue.

The goddess wears a peplos; a dress made of one piece of uncut fabric that drapes around the body, falling in folds. The dress folds at the shoulders, hanging doubled over to her hips and held down by round drapery weights. Most of her left foot and sandal is exposed due to her stance, while only her toes are shown on the right foot. However, the sandal straps have disappeared, as they were cast separately from the rest of the shoe. The statue's features are extremely elaborate as well, and separately cast from the rest of the bronze statue. Her lips are made of copper-rose, and part to reveal teeth made of white marble, while her bronze lashes frame eyes made of marble and chestnut irises. However, due to the condition of the irises the statue looks cross-eyed. Her hair is coiffed in the 'melon' style; the wavy hair has been parted into equal sections, twisted and pulled back, and then combed into two large braids and coiled around the top of her head.

=== Piraeus Artemis B ===
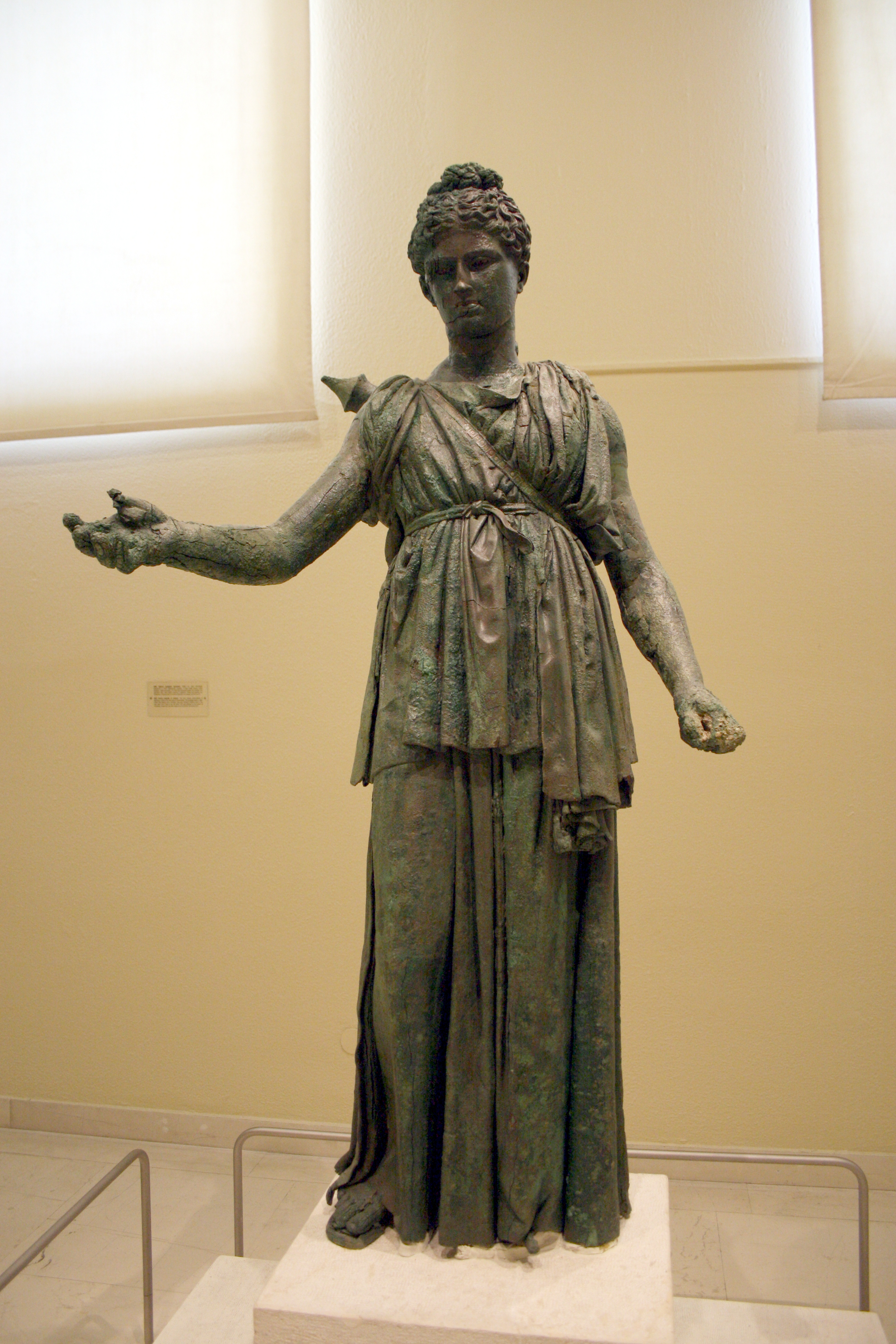
Artemis Piraeus B

- Early Hellenistic (possibly from the 1st part of the 3rd century BCE.)
- Height: 1.55 meters
- Found in Piraeus in 1959, currently in the Piraeus Museum

This is the smaller of the two Artemises and the smallest of the bronze statues found in the Piraeus excavation. In keeping with Greek art, the sculptor took a traditional form and recast it, resulting in a figure with a recognizable but original design. This statue is the least well-preserved of the statues found in the Piraeus cache; the bronze has crumbled slightly, and other sections have separated completely. The right side of her head is also slightly disfigured due to swelling.

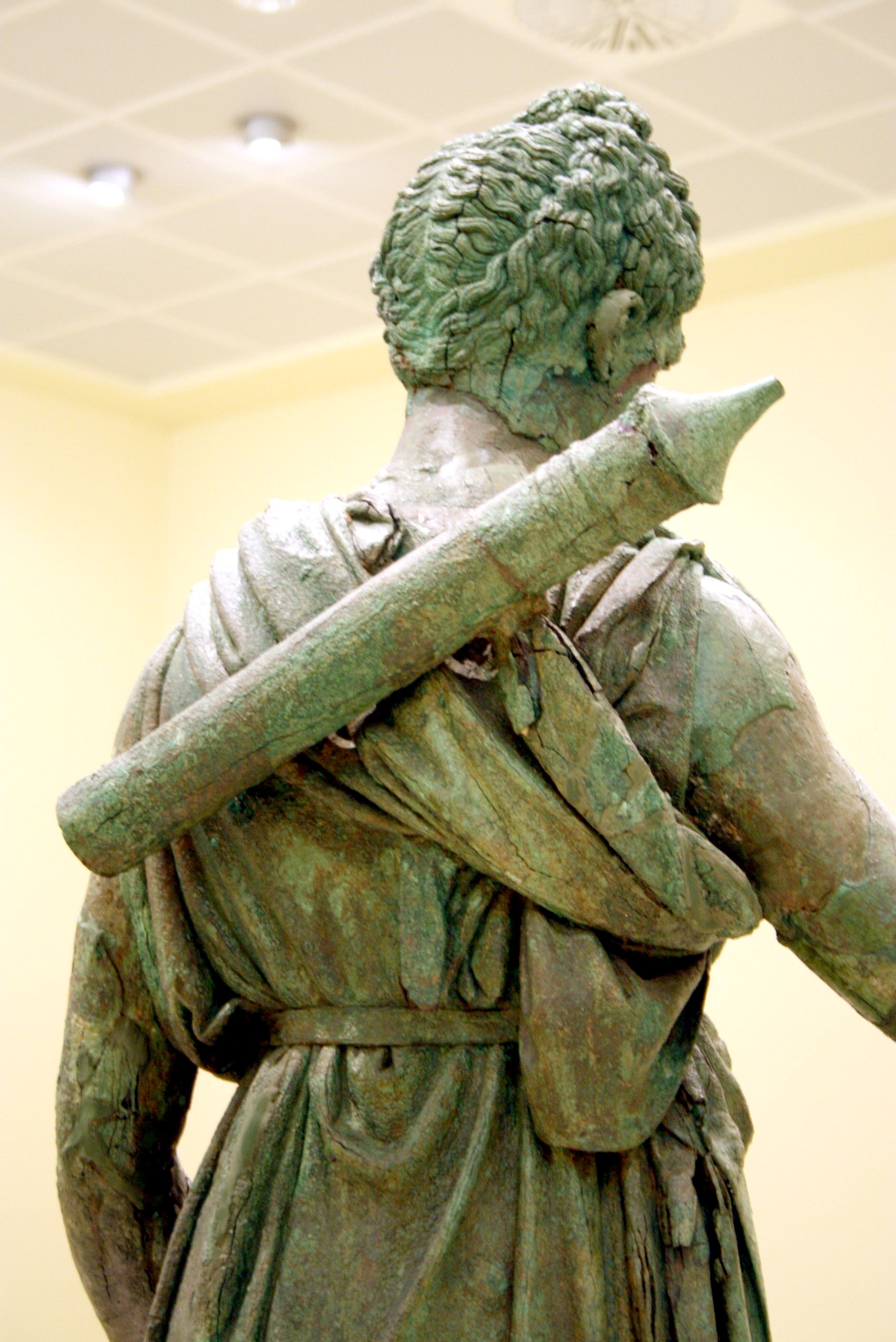
Re-attached quiver

The figure is in a similar stance to that of Artemis A, but rather than taking a Polyclitan stance, Artemis B's stance is clearly Praxitelean. However, unlike the Artemis A, whose gaze is more uniform and slightly to the right, Artemis B turns much more dramatically to the right, her head tilted and focused in the direction of her outstretched right arm. She looks almost fully rotated, creating a real sense of movement to the viewer's eye. Her arms also seem to be positioned farther from her body in comparison to the other statues found in the Piraeus cache. Her left hand is positioned to hold a bow, and, like with Artemis A, evidence of a bronze circle attached to her thumb indicates that she held a phial in her right hand.

Here, rather than the two straps that cross around Artemis A's chest, only one strap crosses over the figure's right shoulder and under her left arm, supporting part of the quiver that is still intact. The quiver itself was cast separately from the rest of the statue and had to be reattached to the statue at some point in antiquity, setting the quiver in a slightly different position than it had been originally. The quiver strap itself is also elaborate; it is decorated with a meander and dot pattern with silver inlay.

The figure wears a belt around her waist that is tied in a knot in the front. The knot was cast separately from the torso, made from cut and hammered bronze. This goddess also wears a peplos that was made separately from the skirt underneath, as well as a cloak that wraps around her right shoulder and across her back, hanging past her left hip.

The Artemis B wears a Hellenistic hairstyle similarly coiled to that of Artemis A, though the coils of hair lie somewhat higher on her head.
