= Piraeus Apollo =

Archaic Greek bronze sculpture

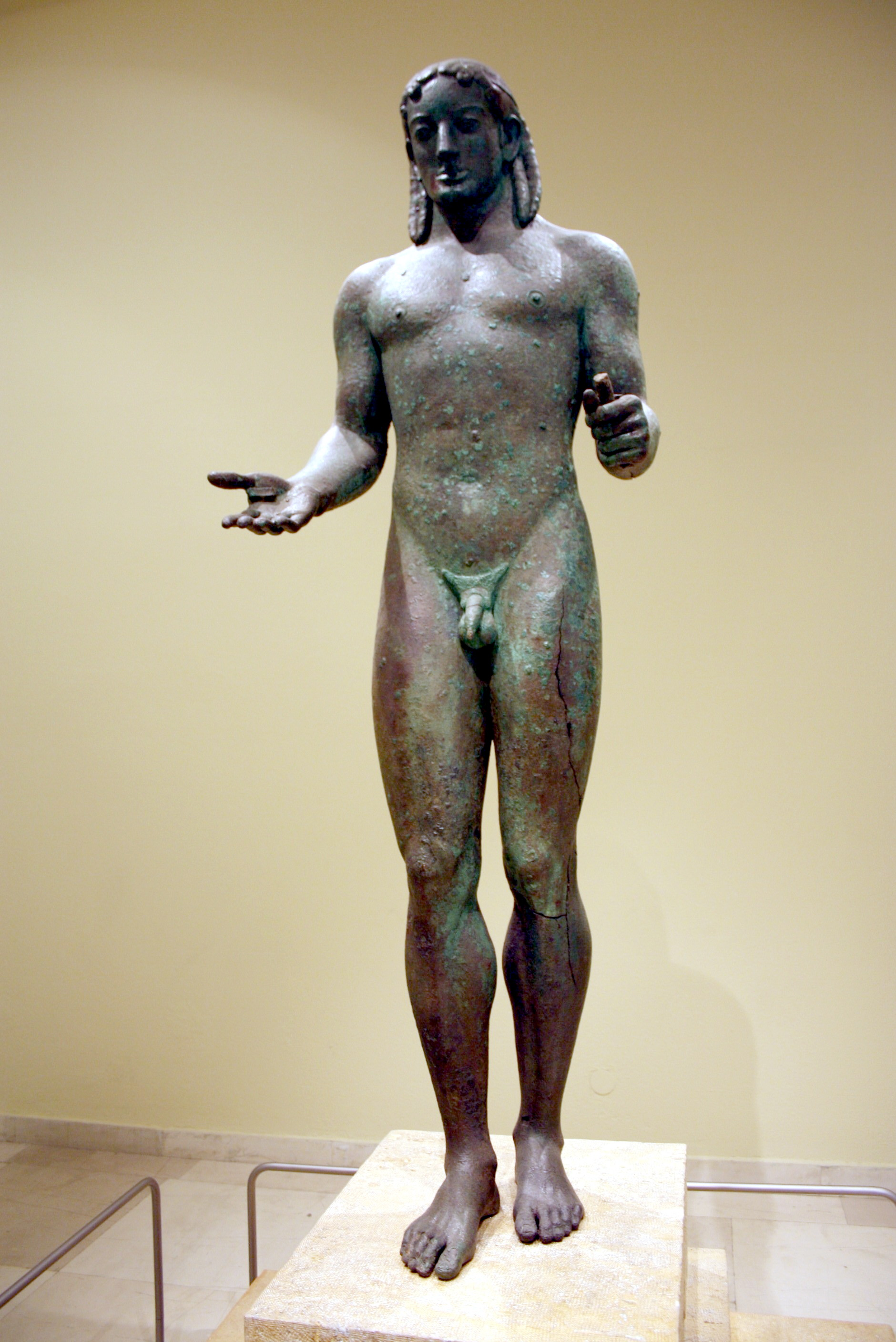
Piraeus Apollo. Archaic-style bronze. Archaeological Museum of Piraeus

The Piraeus Apollo is an ancient Greek bronze sculpture in the archaic style from the 2nd or 1st century BC (or possibly an earlier work dating 4th or 3rd century BC), exhibited now at the Archaeological Museum of Piraeus, Athens.

== Overview ==
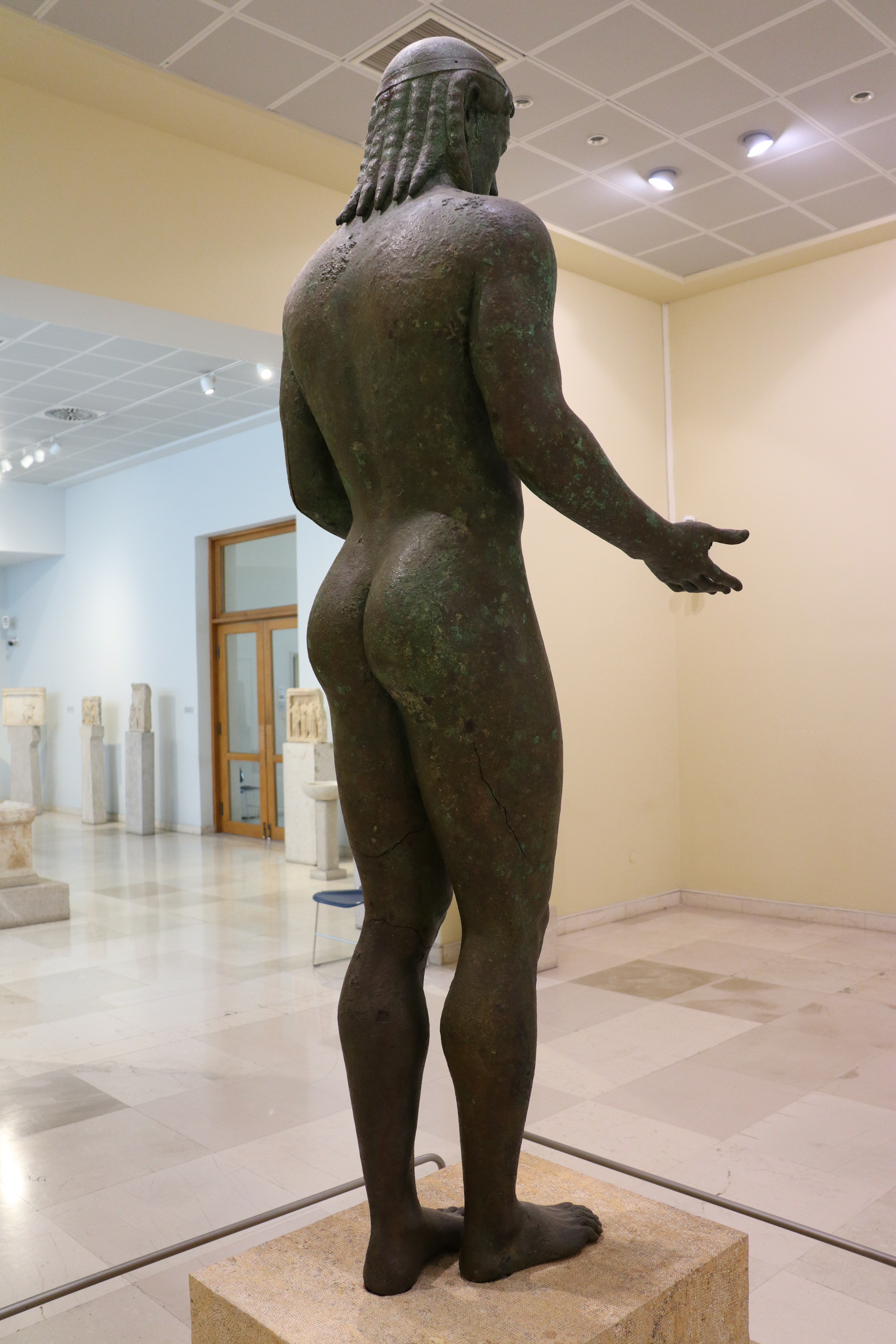
Side-back view of Piraeus Apollo

The sculpture was discovered in the ancient harbor of Piraeus in July 1959, along with the Piraeus Athena and Piraeus Artemis. It was excavated by John Papadimitriou.

The Piraeus Apollo was long thought to be a product of the late archaic period (530–480 BC), and would have been among the few bronzes from that time period to have survived. Newer research view it as a archaizing (mimicking the archaic tradition) sculpture of the Hellenistic period. This is due to its mixing of features from different time periods and its stance, which contrasts other archaic kouroi, such as the Kroisos Kouros, as pointed out by Olga Palagia.

== See also ==
- Artistic canons of body proportions
