= Penelope's Bones =

Nonfiction book by Emily Hause

Penelope's Bones: A New History of Homer's World Through the Women Written Out of It
- 2025 book jacket
- Author: Emily Hauser
- Audio read by: Emily Hauser
- Subject: Women; Epic literature; Segregation; Bronze Age; Slavery; Greek civilization; War.
- Set in: Bronze Age Aegean civilization
- Published: 2025
- Publisher: The University of Chicago Press
- Publication place: United States
- Media type: Print, eBook. Audio
- Pages: 467
- ISBN: 9780226839684
- OCLC: 1456754451

Penelope's Bones: A New History of Homer's World Through the Women Written Out of It is an ancient history and classical history book written by Emily Hauser. It was originally published by the University of Chicago Press in 2025. Based on research from literature and archaeology, Hauser attempts to illustrate what life was like for real women living in Bronze Age Greece, the period alluded to in Homer's Iliad and Odyssey. For United Kingdom readers, this book carries the word "Mythica" in its title, in place of "Penelope's Bones".

== Synopsis ==
According to The Wall Street Journal, in this historical narrative, "[t]he women of Greece’s oldest civilization wove fabrics, carried weapons and wept over their lost children."

Penelope's Bones, is a nonfiction book where the author does provide some analysis of the roles of women in Homer's epics, Iliad and Odyssey. However, unlike the same author's debut novels, where she reinterpreted myths for her fiction, Hauser uses Classics and Ancient History to write this non-fiction book.

She applies her knowledge of the subjects and uses diverse evidence to inquire and show how women were portrayed in Homer's works and what those portrayals inform her readers about the lives of real women in the Bronze Age. Hauser combines multiple disciplines such as history, literary analysis, ancient history, Classical literature, "Greek history, recent archaeological discoveries, along with how the epics came to be, the attitude toward women and gender, as well as modern retellings of myths." Also, she tells the story of Bronze Age history from the perspective of linguistics genetics, biophysics and cell biology.

A major premise in Hauser's book is that women in Homer's narratives and outside the text are ignored or "silenced." So, she demonstrates a central paradox in Homer's epics that she aims to overcome in this book. She says that:

the claim the epics make that women don't matter and the fact that in every case they are essential to the story and the myth. There wouldn't be an epic without a Muse. There wouldn't be a Trojan War without a Helen. The Iliad wouldn't begin without a Briseis. The Odyssey wouldn't end without a Penelope.

=== About the book ===
One method of overcoming this paradox is that, after an introductory chapter entitled "Muse: A New Invocation", Hauser attaches to each chapter-title "a female character from either The Iliad or The Odyssey, using them as a springboard for discussion and as a representative of a role or experience." So, for example, all the chapter titles are like this:

1. Helen (The Face)
2. Briseis (Slave)
3. Chryseis (Daughter)
4. Hecuba (Queen)
5. Andromache (Wife)

of which, there are sixteen chapters named after significant female characters and their roles that occur in these works. However, the book itself is organized into three main parts: an introduction ("Muse: A New Invocation"), a section on women in the Iliad ("Iliad: Women in War"), and a section on women in the Odyssey ("Odyssey: Women at Home and Away"). Following the main sections and commensurate chapters, there are other resources such as a list of characters, a glossary, notes, a bibliography, chapter-opening illustrations, picture acknowledgements, and an index.

== Book title ==
The bones referred to in the title of this book are the remains of a woman, "known to the researchers, somewhat unromantically, as I9033." Her remains were found in a royal burial site in Greece. The bones date back to the 14th century B.C. and were buried with items that indicate she could be a queen, such as gold and semiprecious stones. The author is not claiming that these are the remains of Penelope from The Odyssey. Instead, she is using them to conduct research into the real lives of Bronze Age women who were strongly affected by the actions of men.

== Archaeological research ==
According to Bob Duffy, writing for the Washington Independent Review of Books, by researching archaeological findings, Hauser establishes the narratives of real women who lived and died before 1200 BCE, which is around the time of the supposed destruction of Troy. Scientific analysis demonstrates that these women's lives show close similarities to the portrayal of female characters in the Iliad and the Odyssey. Hauser's research, which combines multiple fields of study, forms the basis of each chapter in her book.

With the intention of researching the idea of Helen of Troy's beauty, Hauser uses a computer to reconstruct the face of a woman who lived during the same era. She also analyzes the DNA of 95 skeletons to understand the family relationships, kinships, and marriage customs of the time, pointing to a parallel to the royal marriage of King Priam and his queen Hecuba of Troy.

=== Warriors ===
Duffy says that Hauser also discusses female warriors. She mentions a Black Sea archaeological site where a Bronze Age warrior buried with honors was discovered to be female. Another find in Asia Minor revealed a male warrior whose tomb contained a comb and a makeshift mirror alongside other prized possessions. According to Duffy, these items suggest the warrior was the type of person who pays close attention to their appearance.

A.E. Stallings, of The New York Times says that some evidence might give credence to ancient Homeric stories of the Amazons. This is based on discoveries in the Thrace and Scythia regions, north of the Black Sea. In these areas, about 20% of the graves with weapons from the fifth and fourth centuries B.C. contained women. Additionally, when a man and woman were buried together, 19th and 20th century archaeologists often assumed they were a husband and wife. However, modern research suggests they could have been a brother and sister, each with their own claim to power.

== Connections ==
Reviewers discuss this book in reference to other works.

In her review for The Wall Street Journal, A. E. Stallings says that fictional works (contemporary novels) inspired by Greek mythology, which underscore the perspective of "silenced" women, have become a trend. She mentions several examples, including Circe by Madeline Miller, A Thousand Ships by Natalie Haynes, and Atalanta by Jennifer Saint. Stallings also says that the author of this book, Emily Hauser, has added to this type of literature.

Emma Greensmith, reviewing this work for The Times Literary Supplement, compares and contrasts this book with several other contemporary works:

Homer's "Iliad" and "Odyssey": A Biography by Alberto Manguel, expanded in 2024;
Epic of the Earth: Reading Homer's "Iliad" in the Fight for a Dying World, 2025, by Edith Hall;
and Hauser's own 2016–2018 Golden Apple Trilogy, consisting of three novels.

== Reception ==
Emma Greensmith, reviewing this work for The Times Literary Supplement, says that "Hauser brings together an astounding array of material, from paintings to pig bones, palatial discoveries to oceanography, and guides us carefully across ancient and modern time." She also says that "Together, these works celebrate the magical mutability of Homer's epics: their ability to distort and to be distorted; their limitless stimuli for imagination and reflection."

Bob Duffy, writing for Washington Independent Review of Books says, "Like the song of the Sirens, Emily Hauser's Penelope's Bones tugs powerfully at its readers, an echoing summons from beyond the horizon. Hauser merges flawless aesthetic intuition about the Homeric epics with a superb command of scientific approaches to Bronze Age history..."

Bill Capossere of the publication Fantasy Literature says that, in contrast to her fictional exploration of myths in her Golden Apple Trilogy, this book is "a highly successful marriage of history and literary criticism, Penelope's Bones will reward those interested in ancient history, Classical literature, or the modern retellings of Classical myths and legends."

Nadya Williams, writing for Fairer Disputations, says that, "Classicist Emily Hauser looks at archaeological revelations to complicate the choppy and incomplete stories of women that we receive from the Homeric epics. This is a quest for the historical women of early Greece, an attempt to discover what their lives and experiences were really like. Hauser brings quiet, two-dimensional characters into three-dimensional reality filled with color and emotion."

A. E. Stallings writes for The Wall Street Journal. She says that the narrative is "[w]ritten with a novelist's flare, Penelope's Bones, with its linked chapters, makes for a surprising page-turner."

== See also ==
- Archaeologically attested ancient Greek women
- Greek Legends of the Amazon women
