= Caecinia Bassa =

Funerary inscription of Caecinia Bassa

Caecinia Bassa was a late 1st-century CE ancient Roman girl recorded in a funerary inscription discovered in a columbarium outside the Porta Salaria in Rome in 1735; formerly in the Kircherian Museum, it is now in Museo Nazionale Romano at the Baths of Diocletian. The text records that Bassa had perished at the age of ten and it commemorates her as a "dutiful daughter" (pia filia) and a "chaste maiden" (virgo pudica) and it states that she surpassed all other girls her age. Furthermore, the inscription states that her parents tried to beseech the gods for help, although they saw little success. Supposedly, Bassa remained captive (obses) to the Parcae for an extended period of time, during which three other house-born slaves (vernae) died before Bassa. This inscription represents a unique type of defixio—that being, a prayer for justice. Unlike standard curse tablets, prayers for justice—including the Bassa inscription—include the name of the suppliant. In this particular case, it is Bassa herself, for the inscription is written in 1st person from her perspective. Ultimately, the inscription invokes Ceres to inflict hunger upon anyone who rejoices at Bassa's unjust death (mors iniqua). Given the food-based nature of the curse, the classicists Ann R. Raia and Judith L. Sebesta suggests that Bassa's ailment was perhaps dietary, though the inscription itself does not provide any specific details regarding her condition. In any case, whereas the act of petitioning Demeter or Ceres to inflict hunger upon the target of a curse is common, there are no other known examples of a defixio that specifically targets individuals for laughing at another's death.

The Bassa inscription also differs from other curse tablets in that it is composed in verse, for which there are only a select few parallels from the rest of attested Latin epigraphy. The first three paragraphs of the inscription all consist of three-line sequences each with the last two indented under the first. Of these paragraphs, the first is an elegiac couplet, whereas the next two were both composed entirely in hexameter. After these three sections, there are two final elegiac couplets, both of which indent the pentameter lines under the hexameter. For an unclear reason, there is an interpunct placed after line 9, whereas no other lines have such punctuation. It could be that the dot is intended to mark a change or subject or a shift in meter, though the scribe did not work any other instances of the same phenomenon in the text. Alternatively, this singular line-final interpunct may be attributed to a mere epigraphic inconsistency on the part of the author.
