= Aurelia Nais =

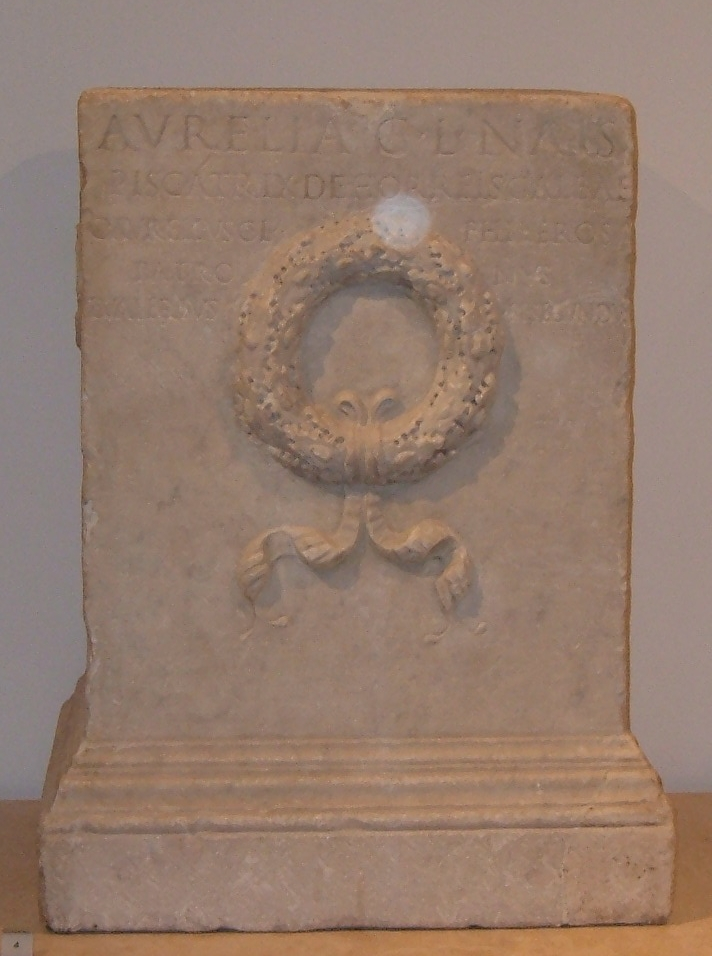
The grave monument commemorating Aurelia Nais. Expanding the traditional abbreviations and inserting a slash where the wreath breaks the lines, it reads: AVRELIA C[ai] L[iberta] NAIS PISCATRIX DE HORREIS GALBAE C[aius] AVRELIVS C[ai] L[ibertus] / PHILEROS PATRO/NVS L[ucius] VALERIVS / L[uci] L[ibertus] SECVNDVS

Aurelia Nais, also known as just Nais, was a Roman piscatrix, or fish-seller, known from a tombstone or cinerary altar dated to the 3rd C. AD. Most Roman epitaphs do not give women's occupations, describing only their familial relationships, so her short inscription provides an unusual amount of information on an ordinary Roman woman.

Aurelia worked in or near the warehouses called the Horrea Galbae (singular would be horreum), selling fish. The fact that this is mentioned on her tombstone has been taken to suggest that Nais worked in the area for a prolonged time, and was not a traveling merchant.

The warehouses were named the Horrea Galbae after becoming imperial property during the reign of emperor Galba, a reign in which Nais lived. They had previously been owned by the Sulpicii family, which built them in the 2nd century BC. They were located near the Aventine Hill in Rome, between its southeast slope and the Monte Testaccio, near the Tiber River. They mostly stored olive oil and wine.

Nais was a freedwoman (liberta), a former slave. Mentioned on Aurelia's grave are two men by the names of Gaius Aurelius Phileros and Lucius Valerius Secundus. The inscription describes Gaius and Lucius as fellow freedmen. It was conventional for a Roman slave to be mononymic, and their owners often called them by exotic Greek names,^{[]} like Nais and Phileros. Gaius is listed as Aurelia's patron (patronus). A slave would take the family name and patronage of their owner when freed, which suggests that Phileros was Aurelia's former owner; the word libertus ("freedman") says he himself the former slave, of a man named Gaius Aurelius or a woman named Gaia Aurelia (these were very common names in the third century; see Gaius (praenomen) and Aurelia gens). Lucius may have been Nais' husband; he originates from a different household than herself and there is little information on his life. The precise relationship between the woman and two men is unclear, but they would all have been Roman citizens. They may have had shared business interests, with Gaius and Lucius honoring Nais by displaying this on the grave. Aurelia may have died first, with the other two putting up the inscription; the lines describing her are better-carved in larger letters, and uninterrupted by the wreath. The stone has three hollows in the top, presumably for holding the cremation urns of the three individuals named on the stone.

== Sources ==
- Harvey, Brian. "Roman Lives: Roman Life as Illustrated by Latin Inscriptions.",135-136. Indiana: Hackett Publishing., 2004.
- Caldelli, Maria Letizia. "Women in the Roman World" in the Oxford Handbook of Roman Epigraphy, edited by Christer Bruun and Jonathan Edmundson, 582–604.Oxford University,2015.
- Becker, Hilary. "Roman Women in the Urban Economy" in Women in Antiquity: Real Women across the Ancient World, edited by Stephanie Lynn Budin and Jean Macintosh Turfa,915-931.London: Routledge, 2016
