= Emily Hauser =

British classicist and novelist

Professor Emily Hauser
- Born: 1987 or 1988 (aged c. 36); Brighton, England, United Kingdom
- Education: University of Cambridge (BA); Yale University (PhD)
- Occupations: Classical scholar and historical novelist
- Employer: University of Exeter

Emily Hauser (born 1987 or 1988) is a British scholar of classics and a historical fiction novelist. She is a lecturer in classics and ancient history at the University of Exeter and has published three novels in her "Golden Apple" trilogy: For the Most Beautiful (2016), For the Winner (2017) and For the Immortal (2018).

== Early life and education ==
Hauser was born in Brighton, United Kingdom and brought up in Suffolk. She attended The Abbey school in Woodbridge and Orwell Park School near Ipswich, where she began learning Greek at the age of 11.

Hauser studied classics at Gonville and Caius College, Cambridge, where she was taught by Mary Beard, graduating with a BA in 2009. She was awarded a Fulbright Scholarship at Harvard University for the 2010–2011 academic year. She completed an MA and MPhil at Yale University in 2015, and her PhD at Yale in 2017, with a thesis titled 'Since Sappho: Women in Classical Literature and Contemporary Women’s Writing' supervised by Emily Greenwood. While at Yale, Hauser twice received the Alice Derby Lang Essay Prize awarded to students attaining "high scholarship" in classical literature or art.

== Academic career ==
After receiving her PhD, she returned to Harvard as a junior fellow in the Society of Fellows for 2017–2018, and joined the University of Exeter as a lecturer in classics and ancient history in July 2018.

In 2011, Hauser translated Philippe Rousseau (helléniste)'s 2001 article "L'Intrigue de Zeus", published in French literary magazine Europe, from French to English for the Harvard University Center of Hellenic Studies.

Hauser's academic work focuses on authorship and gender in antiquity, women in Homeric epic and classical reception in contemporary women's writing. Her first monograph, How Women Became Poets: A Gender History of Greek Literature, was published by Princeton University Press in 2023. In it, Hauser investigates the language of poetic production in classical literature, and its role in suppressing and marginalising female voices from antiquity.

Hauser's novels also reflect her focus on women's narratives and how these can expand contemporary understanding of classical stories by providing new perspectives.

== Novels ==
Hauser's first novel, For the Most Beautiful, was published by Transworld (Penguin Random House) in 2016 and is the first in The Golden Apple Trilogy. It retells the story of the Trojan War from the perspective of Krisayis, daughter of the Trojans' High Priest, and Briseis, a princess of Pedasus enslaved after her husband is killed by the Greeks. The title comes from the inscription upon the Apple of Discord in Greek mythology, which Eris, the goddess of strife, offered as a gift at the wedding of Peleus and Thetis, bringing about the Judgement of Paris and the Trojan War.

Hauser has expressed the importance of women's voices and narratives to her work in a 2016 interview with Ancient History Encyclopedia (AHE). In the interview, Hauser notes that the lack of female perspective in the Iliad often contributes to a dismissal of the tale as a mere war story focused on men.

One of Hauser's main motivations for writing is to make the literature of antiquity accessible to those who have not yet encountered the classical world. Hauser has stated that the background for her character building for Krisayis was supplemented by post-classical receptions of Chryseis, namely the Shakespearean depiction of Cressida. Both Chaucer and Shakespeare's versions contributed to Hauser's interest in the confusion of Briseis and Chryseis in the medieval tradition. Hauser expands the narratives of the two women in her novel, developing the idea that "these are actually two facets of one woman who [is] experiencing the Trojan War from different perspectives."

She has published two further books in The Golden Apple Trilogy: For the Winner (2017), which retells the story of Atalanta and her travels with the Argonauts, and For the Immortal (2018), which follows Admete and her journey along with Heracles to recover the Belt of Hippolyta. Hippolyta, the queen of the Amazons, is also a major character in the narrative.

== Selected publications ==
=== Non-fiction books ===
- Reading Poetry, Writing Genre: English Poetry and Literary Criticism in Dialogue with Classical Scholarship (2018), Oxford, London: Bloomsbury (edited, with Silvio Bär)
- How Women Became Poets: A Gender History of Greek Literature (2023), Princeton University Press.
- Penelope's Bones: A New History of Homer’s World through the Women Written Out of It (2025), Chicago University Press. Published in the UK under the title Mythica: A New History of Homer’s World, through the Women Written Out Of It.

=== Non-fiction book chapters ===
- ''Homer Undone': Homeric Scholarship and the Invention of Female Epic.' (2018) in Bär S, Hauser E (Eds.) Reading Poetry, Writing Genre: English Poetry and Literary Criticism in Dialogue with Classical Scholarship, London, Oxford: Bloomsbury, 151-171.
- 'Making Men: Gender and the Poet in Pindar' (2022), in Cordes L, Fuhrer T (Eds.) The Gendered ‘I’ in Ancient Literature: Modelling Gender in First-Person Discourse, De Gruyter, 129-149.
- 'Women in Homer and Beyond' (2024) in Greensmith, E. (ed.), The Cambridge Companion to Greek Epic, Cambridge University Press, 274-294.

=== Novels ===
The Golden Apple Trilogy, a series by Emily Hauser, consists of the following three novels:

- For the Most Beautiful (2016) London, Transworld
- For the Winner. (2017) London, Transworld
- For the Immortal (2018) London, Transworld

=== Journal articles ===
- 'Erica Jong’s Sappho’s Leap: (Re-)Constructing Gender and Authorship through Sappho' (in press), Synthesis, 12, 55-75.
- 'Putting an end to Song: Penelope, Odysseus and the Teleologies of the Odyssey.' (in press), Helios, 47(1), 39-69.
- 'When Classics Gets Creative: from Research to Practice.' (2019) Transactions of the American Philological Association, 149 (2), 163-177.
- ''There is another story': Writing after the Odyssey in Margaret Atwood’s The Penelopiad.' (2017) Classical Receptions Journal, 10(2), 109-126.
- 'In Her Own Words: the Semantics of Female Authorship in Ancient Greece, from Sappho to Nossis.' (2016) Ramus, 45(2), 133-164.
- 'Optima tu proprii nominis auctor: the Semantics of Female Authorship in Ancient Rome, from Sulpicia to Proba.' (2016) Eugesta, 6, 151-186.
