= Severa Seleuciane =

- Photograph and facsimile drawing of the inscription
- Born: 237
- Died: 279
- Monuments: A funerary epitaph
- Occupation: weaver?
- Era: 3rd century CE
- Spouse: Aurelius Sabutius

Severa Seleuciane (237–279) was an ancient Roman woman who is commemorated by a funerary inscription found in Rome. The epitaph is inscribed on a marble tablet c. 0.73 m long and 0.31 m high. It was found in the 17th century in one of the extramural Christian cemeteries northeast of Rome; a document dated to the pontificate of Alexander VII (1655–1667) implies that it is from either the cemetery of Priscilla on the Via Salaria or the cemetery of Cyriaca on the Via Tiburtina. It is now in the collection of the Musei Capitolini (inv. no. NCE 2799).

The inscription mentions that Severa Seleuciane lived with her husband, Aurelius Sabutius, for 17 years, and that their time together ended—presumably on account of her death—during the third consulship of Emperor Probus and the second of Nonius Paternus, equating to the year 279 CE. The inscription asks, "How many years did she live in the world?" ("Quot vixit in seculo?"), a question it then answers with the number thirty-two, with her time living "in the world" ending during the consulships of Emperor Claudius Augustus and Paternus, meaning the year 269 CE. According to the classicist James H. Oliver, the mention of life "in the world" probably referred to one's time on Earth as opposed to the eternal afterlife that—in Christian theology—awaits adherents of the faith. However, the end of her time living "in the world" was probably not marked by her death, but instead her conversion to Christianity. This statement probably alludes to a motif found in the New Testament, mostly in the Fourth Gospel, that followers of God are in some way foreign to the world, for the world itself is separated from God.

Based on the dates implied by the epitaph, it can be concluded that Seleuciane married Sabutius at age twenty-five, converted to Christianity at age thirty-two—between the time of Decian and Diocletianic persecutions—and then died at age forty-two. Since no children are mentioned on the inscription, it is likely that she had none. According to the classicist G. H. R. Horsley, twenty-five is an unusually high age for a Roman woman to have been married, though Jewish and Christian women tended to get married at older ages than pagan women. On this basis, Horsley proposes, albeit tentatively. that Seleuciane may have been a convert from Judaism. The monument contains an incised image of a two-beam loom, which may indicate that she was a weaver in life.
