= Archaeological Museum of Piraeus =

Museum in Piraeus, Greece

Coordinates: 37°56′14″N 23°38′40″E

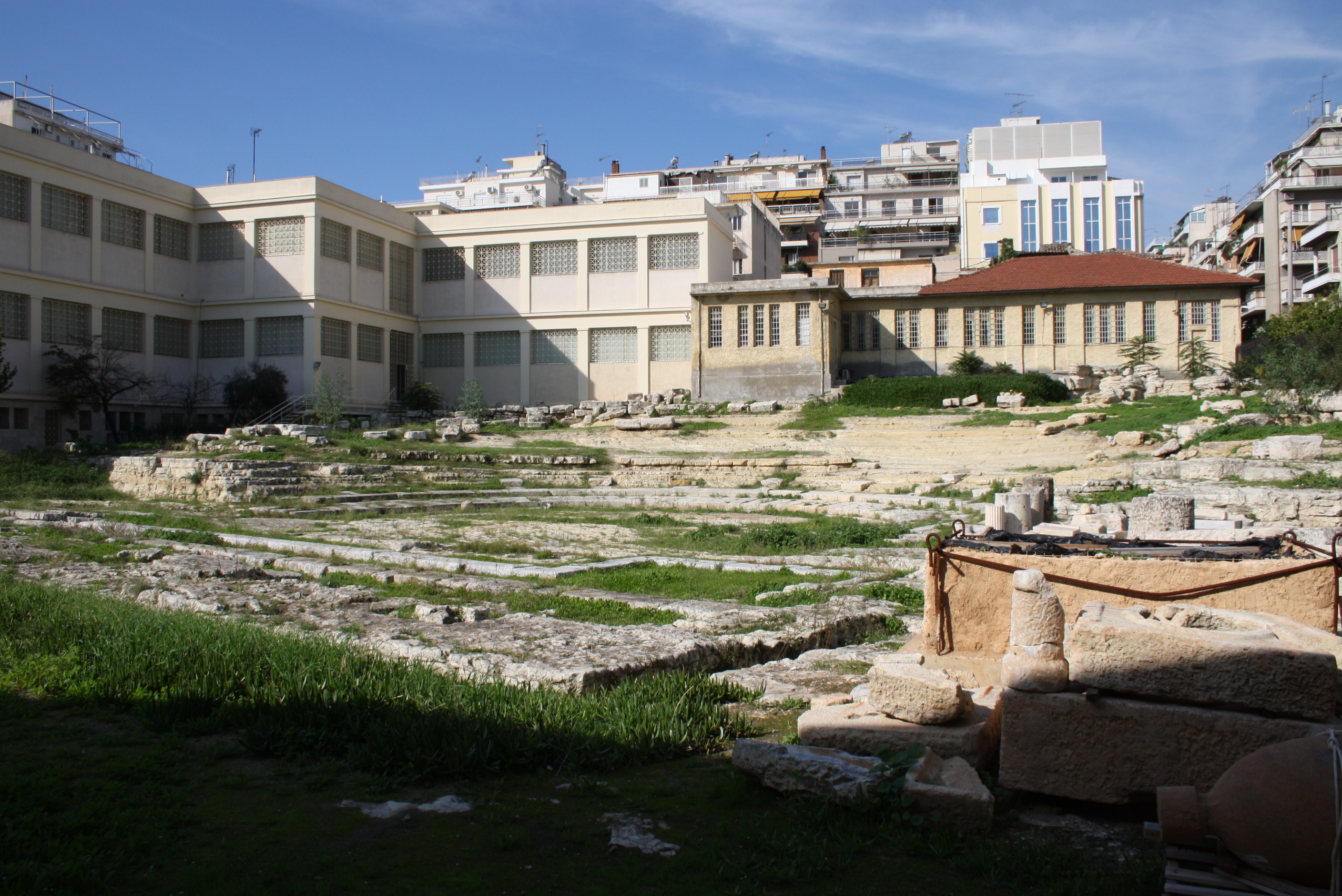
The ruins of the Theatre of Zea, next to the Archaeological Museum of Piraeus

The Archaeological Museum of Piraeus is a museum in Piraeus, a port city within the Athens urban area in Greece. It contains mainly sculptures, discovered in Piraeus and in the area of the Attic coast from Bronze Age to Roman times.

== Collections ==
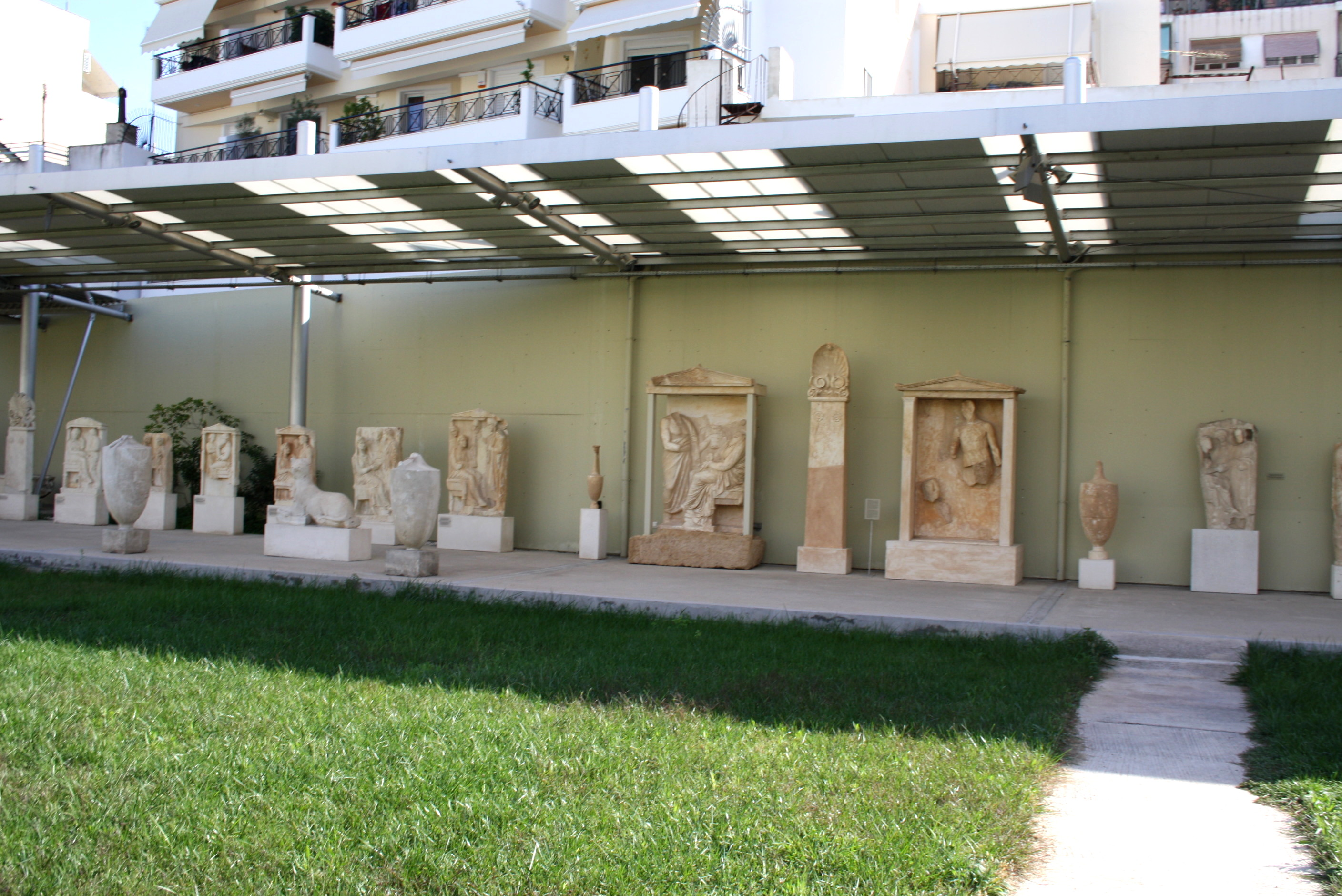
The open-air exhibition along the Ancient Greek theater in the Archaeological Museum of Piraeus.

The museum's displayed objects are divided in sections:

- Prehistoric collection (Mycenaean)
- Pottery collection
- Bronze statues
- A reconstruction of a typical Classical sanctuary (Cybele's)
- Classical gravestones
- Large funerary monuments
- Hellenistic sculptures
- Roman sculptures

== The building ==
The old building of the museum (330 m^{2}), which is currently used as a storage room, was built in 1935. The new two-store building, which was inaugurated in 1981, covers a total area of total 1.394 m^{2}. Both buildings neighbour on the Zeas (Greek: Ζέα) ancient classical theater. In the near future, the theater site is going to be used as an open-air sculpture exhibition.

== Visitors information ==
The museum is accessible with the Athens metro or bus lines. It is 15-minute walk from Piraeus station and a couple minute walk from bus station. Moreover, it is a 5-minute walk from the area for the reception of Cruise ships of the Piraeus port.

== Gallery ==
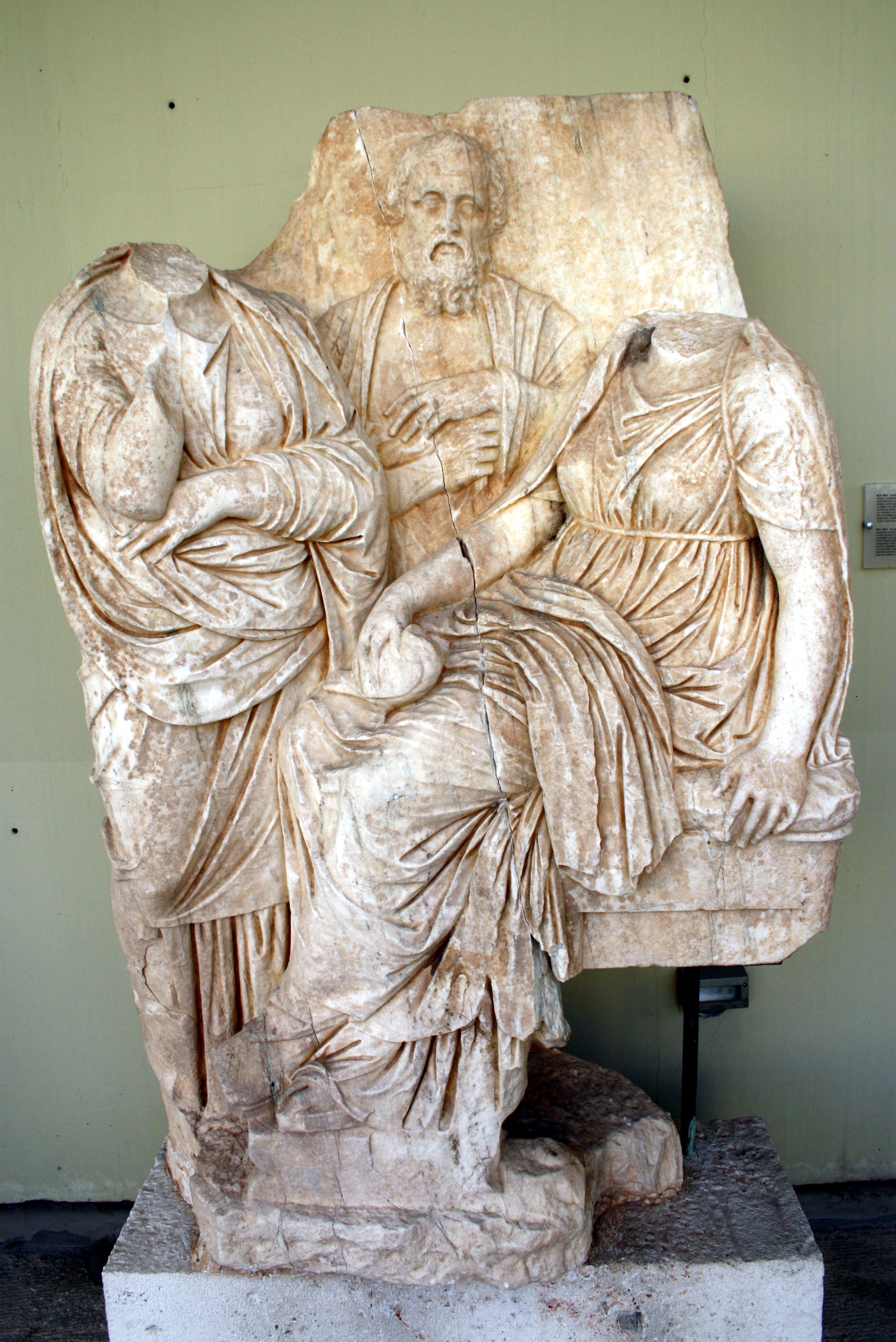
Funerary relief for a girl, flanked by her parents (330/320 BC)

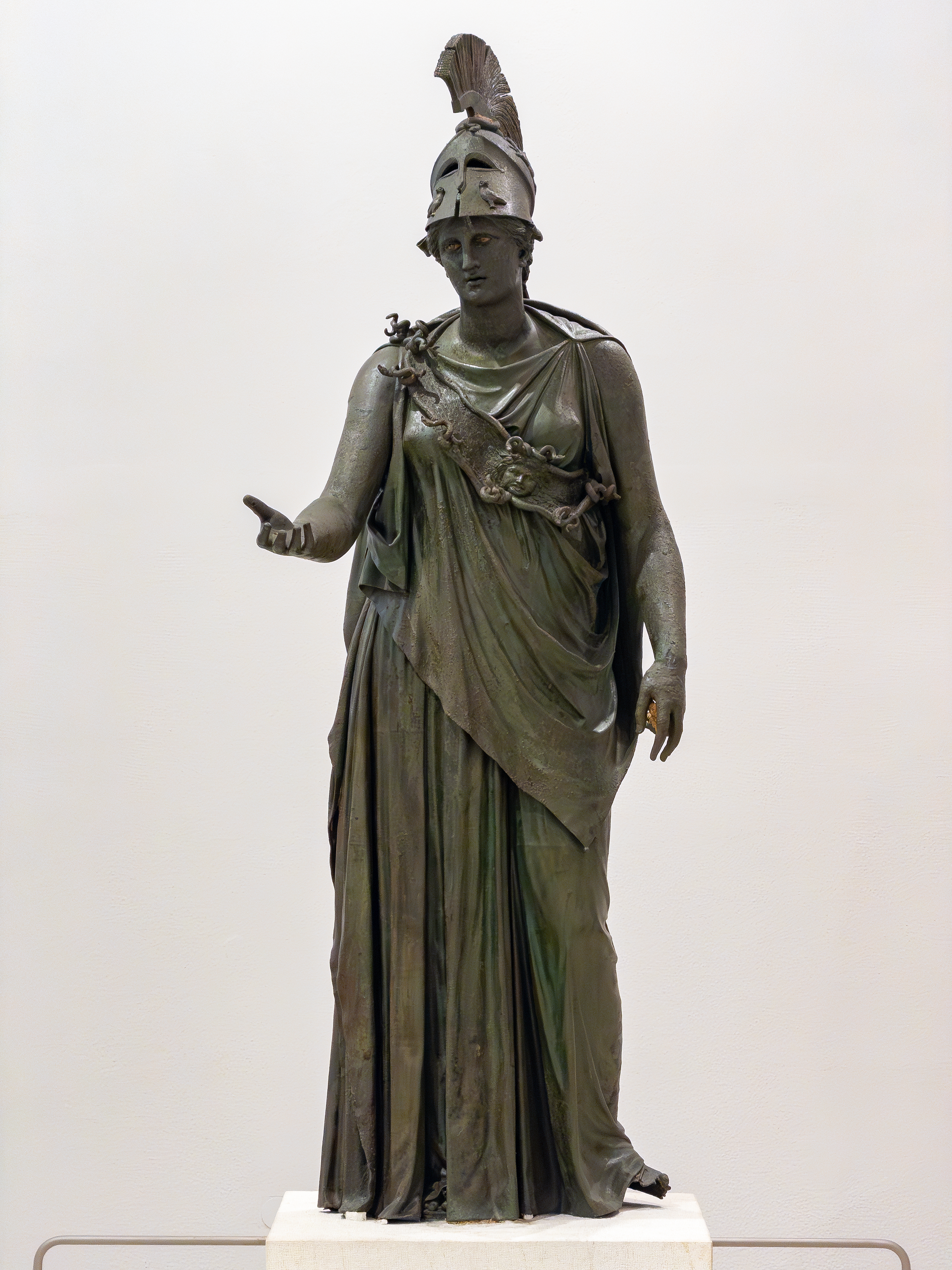
The Piraeus Athena, a classical-age bronze

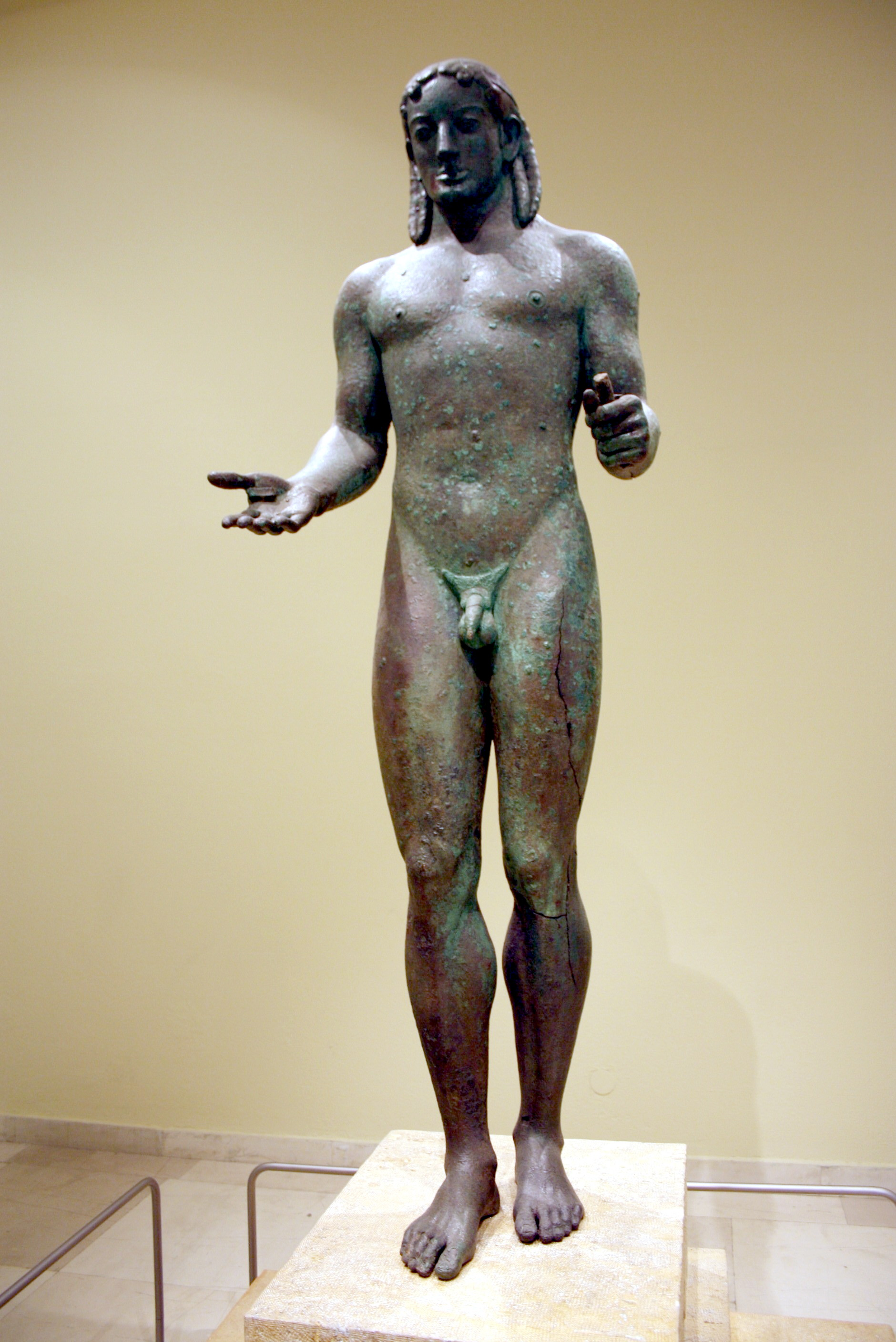
The Piraeus Apollo, an archaic-age bronze

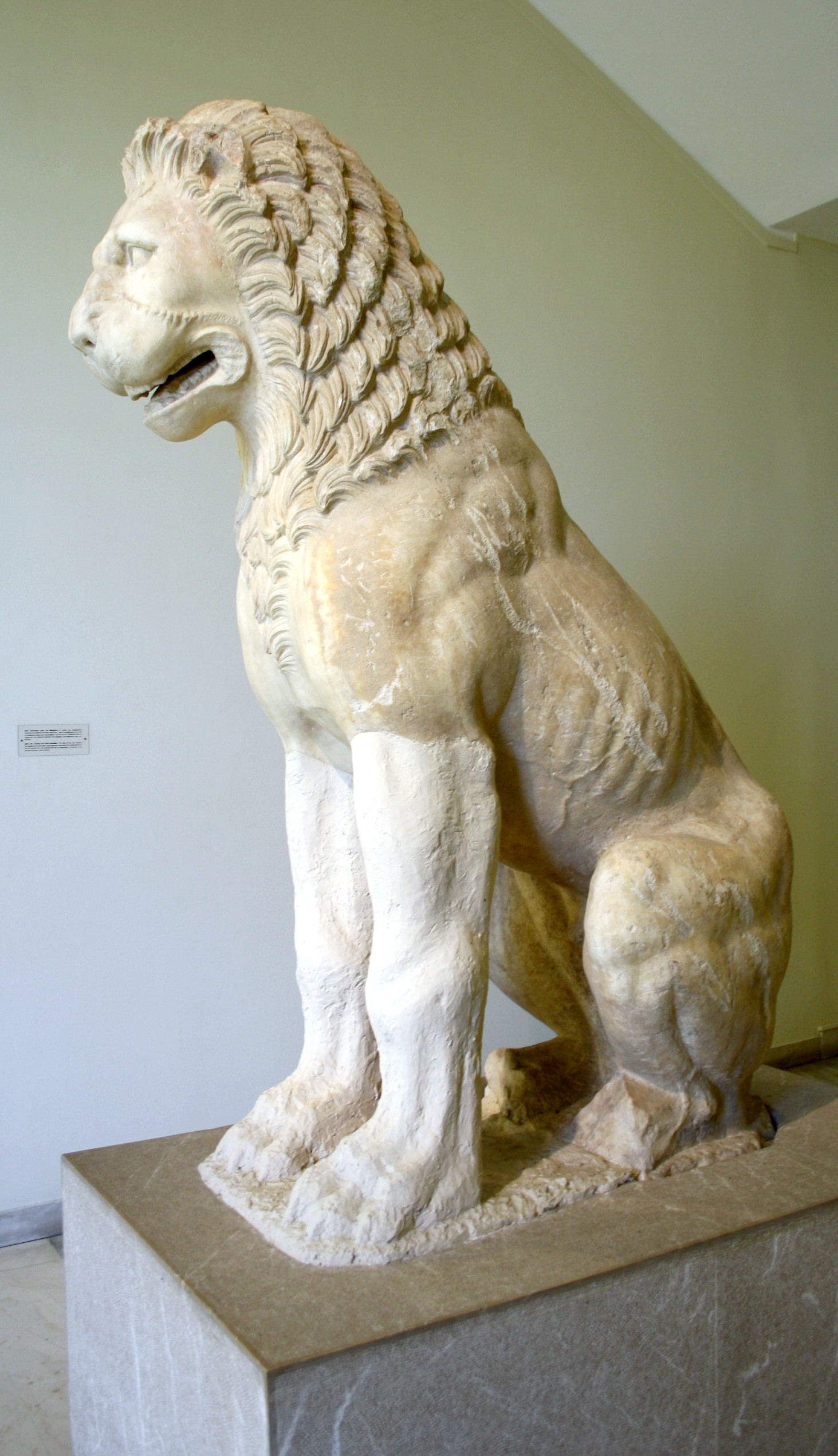
Copy of Piraeus Lion

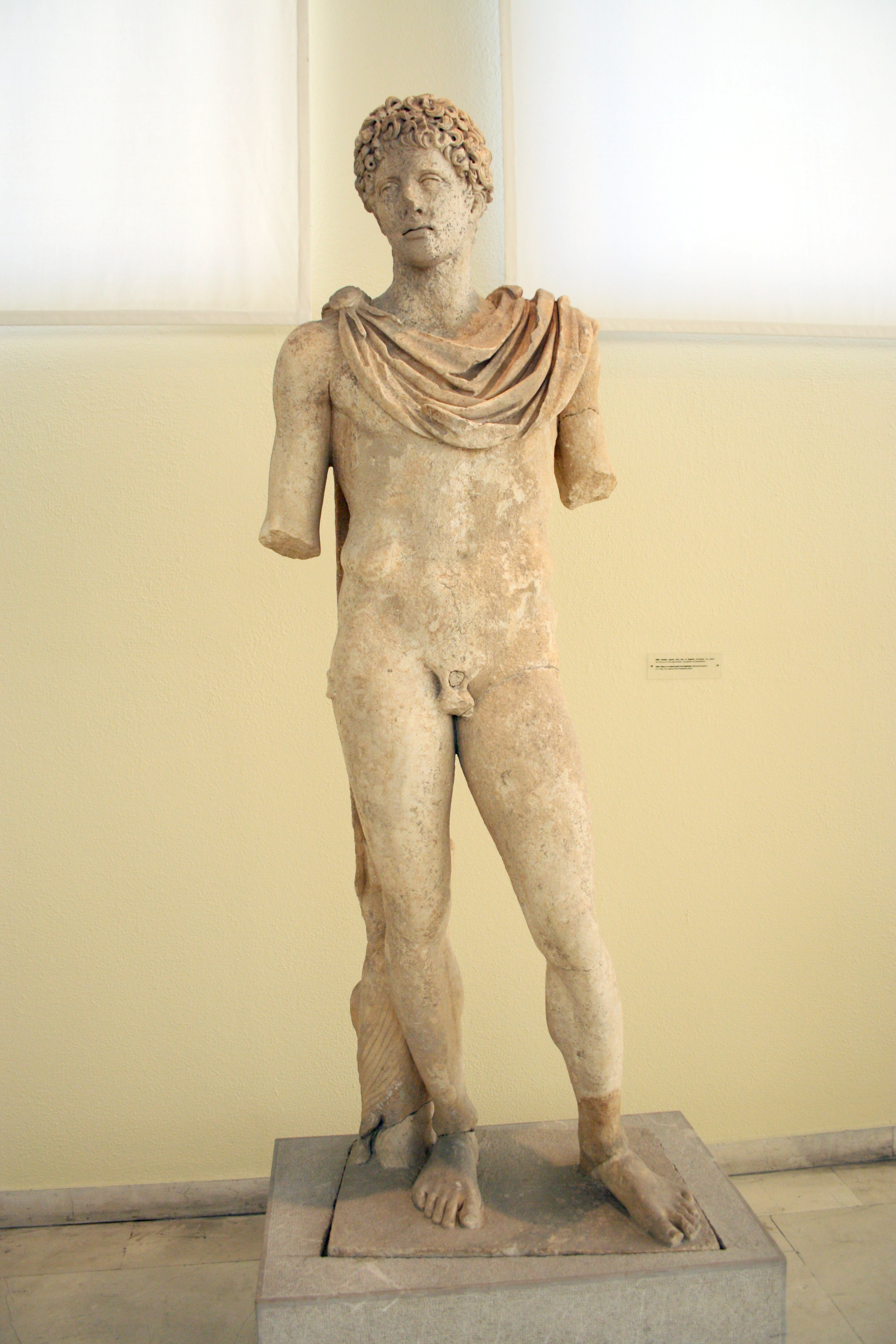
Nude ephebe (2nd century CE), Roman copy after an original of the Polykleitan school

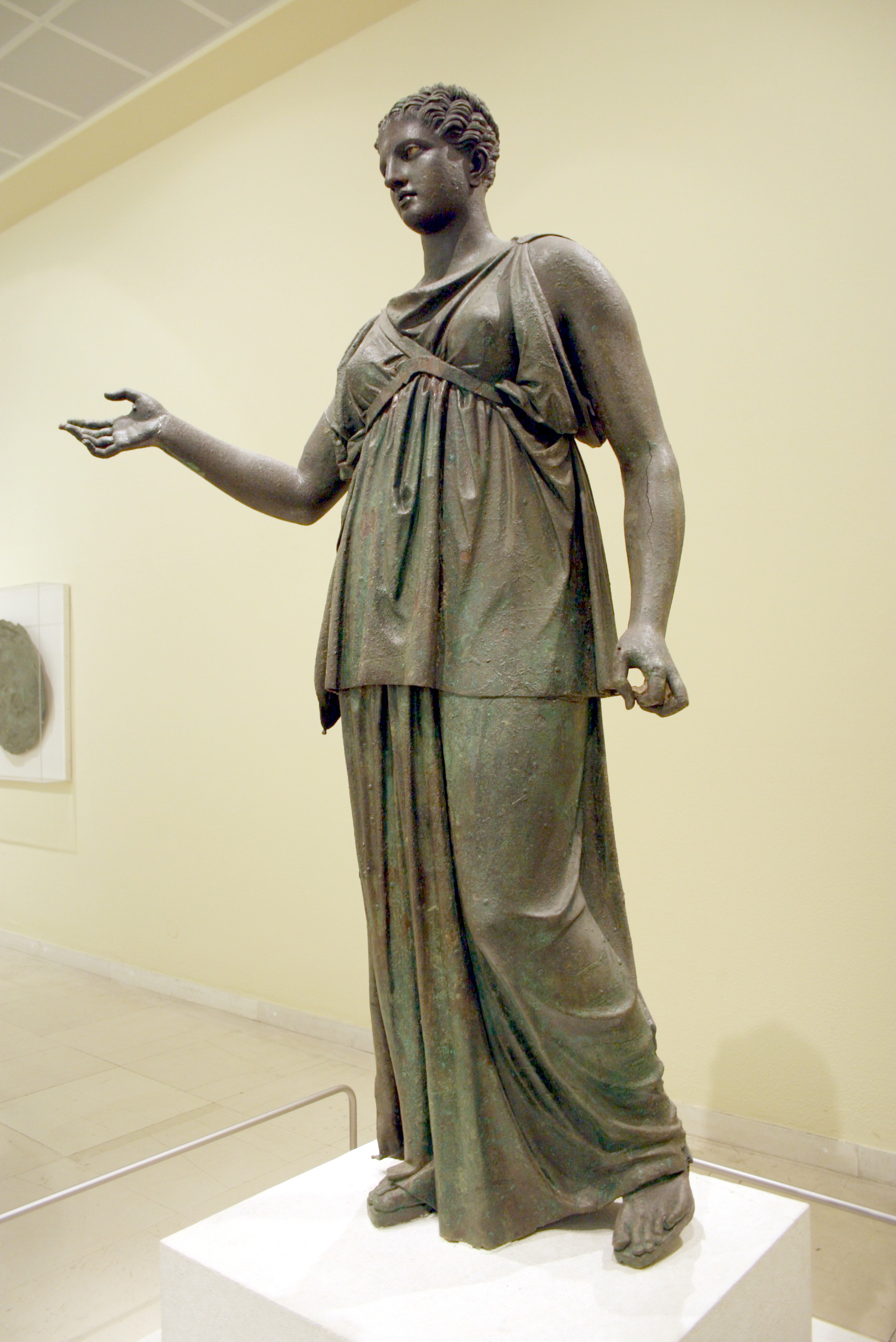
Bronze statue of a Piraeus Artemis. It dates from the mid-4th century and is attributed to the sculptor Euphranor

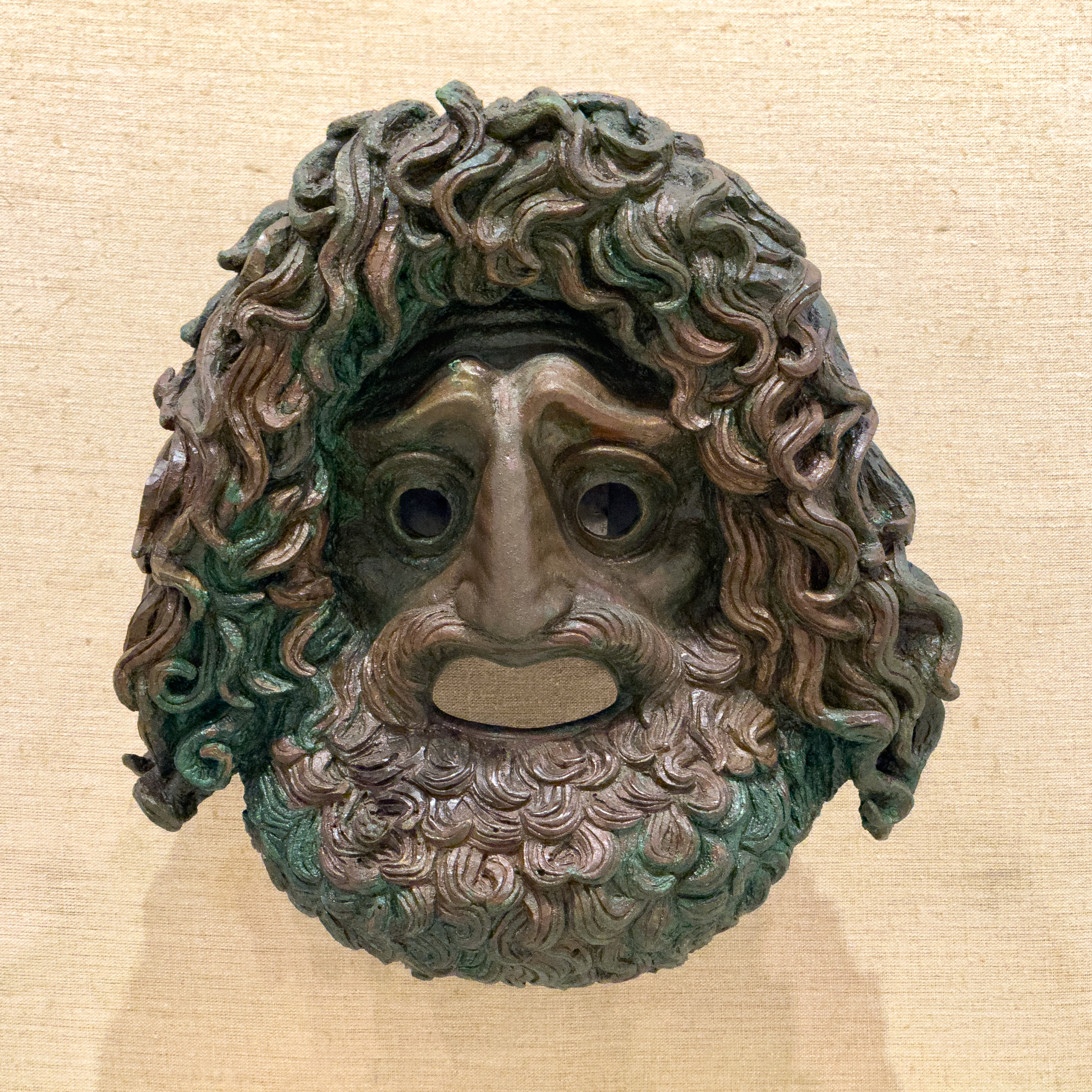
Bronze tragic mask from the mid-4th century and is attributed to the sculptor Silanion

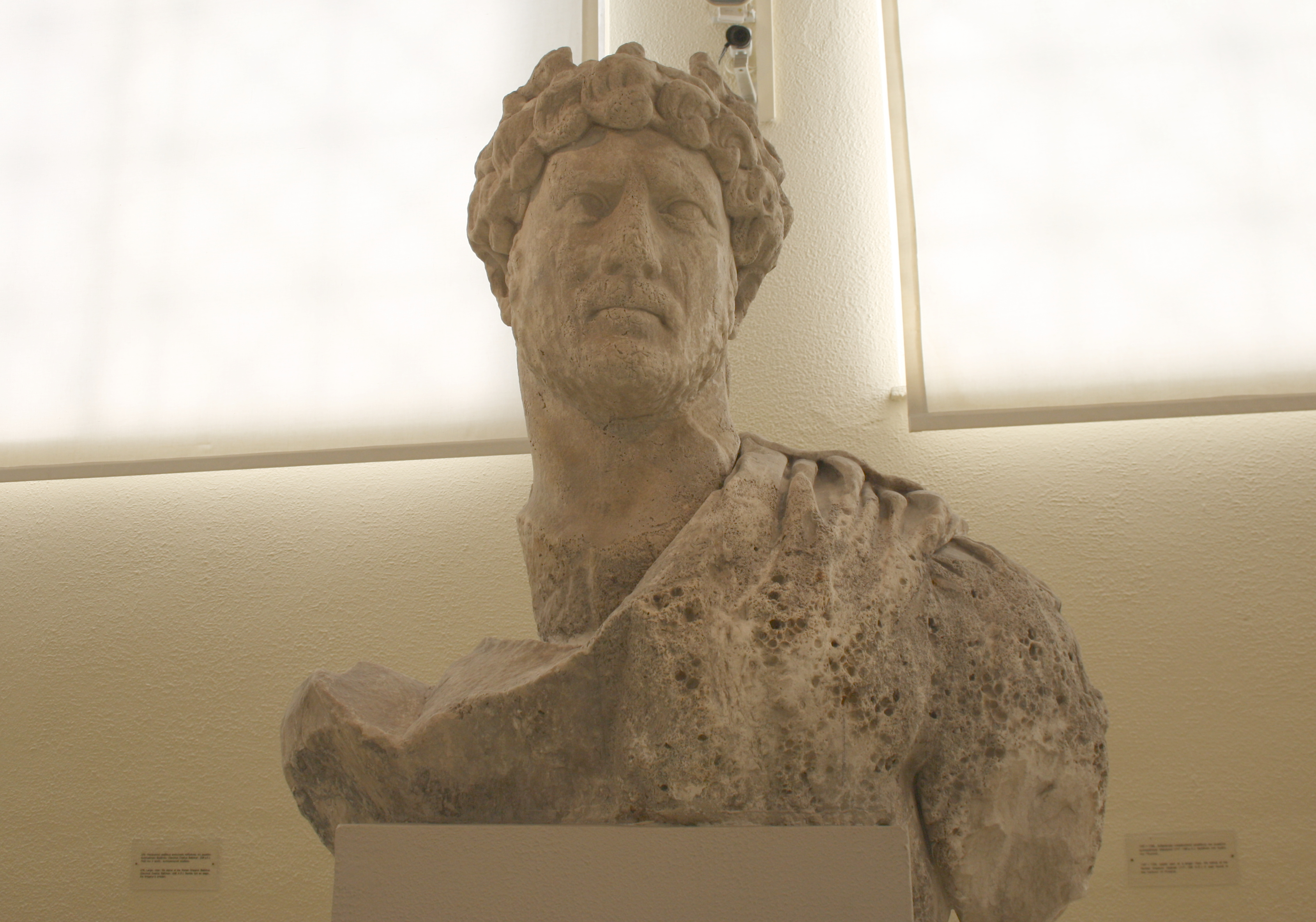
Remains of a colossal statue of Hadrian.

== See also ==
- List of museums in Greece
- Ancient Greek art
- Ancient Greek sculpture
- Pottery of ancient Greece
