= Proselenos =

Belief that the ancient Arcadians were older than the Moon

Proselenos (Ancient Greek: Προσέληνος) is the concept referring to the belief that the ancient Arcadians were a group of people older than the Moon (Selene in Greek) itself. This aspect of the Arcadian identity was in opposition to the other groups inhabiting the Peloponnese, who claimed to be descended from the Dorians. There were some other exceptions, however, such as the Eleans (who were thought to descend from Aetolia), the Cynurians (who adapted Dorian elements into their local identity), and the Achaeans (who were thought to have relocated to the northern Peloponnese following the Dorian invasion of the peninsula).

The antiquity of the Arcadians was also shown in their mythical ancestry, claiming that they descended from the hero Pelasgus, who sprung from the earth to become their ancestor and whose son was Lycaon, the grandfather of the region's eponymous hero, Arcas.

== Concept origin ==
The oldest reference to the story of the Arcadians pre-dating the moon is attested in the Classical period (479 - 323 BCE) of Greek history from the fifth century BCE historian, Hippys of Rhegium. (Note: According to Stephanus of Byzantium Hippys of Rhegium is considered to be the first author to refer to the Arcadians by this epithet.) The fragment from Hippys is preserved in the later (sixth century CE) work of Stephanus of Byzantium. The term is also applied by the fourth century BCE philosopher Aristotle, as well as Eudoxos of Cnidus, a fourth century BCE astronomer and mathematician. An unknown fifth century poet also mentioned proselenaios as an epithet of Pelasgus, the ancestor of the Arcadians; Borgeaud and Nielsen proposes that this may have been the fifth century Theban lyric poet, Pindar.

== Later sources ==
The idea that the Arcadians were older than the moon is also referenced in the work of later writers, such as Apollonius of Rhodes, Statius and Lucian. It is also worth noting that Plutarch mentions that the Arcadians shared a kinship with oak trees, as they were believed to be the first men who sprung from the earth, already when the first oak was planted, further illustrating the great antiquity of the Arcadians as the people who preceded the moon.

== Bibliography ==
- Borgeaud, Philippe (1988). The cult of Pan in ancient Greece. University of Chicago Press. ISBN 978-0-226-06596-0.
- Dueck, Daniela (2020-06-20). "A lunar people: the meaning of an Arcadian epithet, or, who is the most ancient of them all?". Philologus. 164 (1): 133–147. doi:10.1515/phil-2020-0101. ISSN 2196-7008.
- Lassare, François (1966). Die Fragmente des Eudoxos von Knidos: Texte und Kommentare (in German). Berlin: De Gruyter. doi:10.1515/9783110828931. ISBN 978-3-11-005118-6.
- Nielsen, Thomas (2002). Arkadia and its poleis in the archaic and classical periods. Hypomnemata. Vol. 140. Göttingen: Vandenhoeck & Ruprecht.
- Rose, Valentin (1886). Aristotelis qui ferebantur librorum fragmenta (in Ancient Greek). Teubner.
- Smith, David (2013). "Hippys (554)". In Worthington, Ian (ed.). Brill's New Jacoby. Pt 3. Leiden.
