= 387 BC =

387 BC in various calendars
- Gregorian calendar: 387 BC; CCCLXXXVII BC
- Ab urbe condita: 367
- Ancient Egypt era: XXIX dynasty, 12
- Pharaoh: Hakor, 7
- Ancient Greek Olympiad (summer): 98th Olympiad, year 2
- Assyrian calendar: 4364
- Balinese saka calendar: N/A
- Bengali calendar: −980 – −979
- Berber calendar: 564
- Buddhist calendar: 158
- Burmese calendar: −1024
- Byzantine calendar: 5122–5123
- Chinese calendar: 癸巳年 (Water Snake); 2311 or 2104 — to — 甲午年 (Wood Horse); 2312 or 2105
- Coptic calendar: −670 – −669
- Discordian calendar: 780
- Ethiopian calendar: −394 – −393
- Hebrew calendar: 3374–3375
- Hindu calendars
- Vikram Samvat: −330 – −329
- Shaka Samvat: N/A
- Kali Yuga: 2714–2715
- Holocene calendar: 9614
- Iranian calendar: 1008 BP – 1007 BP
- Islamic calendar: 1039 BH – 1038 BH
- Javanese calendar: N/A
- Julian calendar: N/A
- Korean calendar: 1947
- Minguo calendar: 2298 before ROC 民前2298年
- Nanakshahi calendar: −1854
- Thai solar calendar: 156–157
- Tibetan calendar: ཆུ་མོ་སྦྲུལ་ལོ་ (female Water-Snake) −260 or −641 or −1413 — to — ཤིང་ཕོ་རྟ་ལོ་ (male Wood-Horse) −259 or −640 or −1412

Year 387 BC was a year of the pre-Julian Roman calendar. At the time, it was known as the Year of the Tribunate of Papirius, Fidenas, Mamercinus, Lanatus and Poplicola (or, less frequently, year 367 Ab urbe condita). The denomination 387 BC for this year has been used since the early medieval period, when the Anno Domini calendar era became the prevalent method in Europe for naming years.

== Events ==
=== By place ===
==== Greece ====
- End of the Corinthian War:

- Peace of Antalcidas (or "the king's peace") is brokered by Artaxerxes II. Under the Peace, all the Asiatic mainland and Cyprus remain under Persian control, Lemnos, Imbros, and Scyros remain Athenian dependencies, and all the other Greek states are to receive autonomy. By the King's Peace, the Persians become key players in Greek politics.
- Under the threat of Spartan intervention, Thebes disbands its league, and Argos and Corinth end their shared government. Corinth is incorporated back into Sparta's Peloponnesian League.

- Plato founds the Platonic Academy in Athens, where he teaches Aristotle until 347 BC.

==== Sicily and Adriatic ====
- With the aid of the Lucanians, Dionysius I of Syracuse devastates the territories of Thurii, Crotone, and Locri in mainland Italy. When Rhegium falls, Dionysius becomes the chief power in Greek Southern Italy. He then turns his attention to the Adriatic and founds the colonies of Ancona (Ankon) and Adria (Adrìa).
- Plato is forced by Dionysius to leave Syracuse after having exercised the right of free speech too broadly. Plato returns to Athens, outside which he founds a school.

==== Roman Republic ====
- Rome begins to rebuild after being invaded by the Gauls under Brennus.
- Marcus Furius Camillus introduces the Capitoline Games (Ludi Capitolini) in honour of Jupiter Capitolinus, and in commemoration of Rome's Capitol not being captured by the Gauls.

== Deaths ==
- Wen, marquis of the State of Wei, China
- Rhydondis, Greek mercenary (b. c. 386 BC)
