= 383rd Division =

383rd Division may refer to:

- 383rd Infantry Division, Wehrmacht, Germany
- 383rd Rifle Division, Soviet Union

== See also ==
- List of military divisions by number
- 383rd (disambiguation)
