= Macedonian tomb of Elafochori =

Archaeological site in Greece

- Tomb of Elafochori, Thracian tomb of Elafochori
- Type: Macedonian tomb with Thracian features
- Location: Elafochori, Evros, Greece

History
- Built: 4th century BC

Site notes
- Material: Gravel, porphyry

The Macedonian tomb of Elafochori is an archeological monument near the settlement of Elafochori in the prefecture of Evros in Greece. The monument belongs to the Macedonian type of tombs, but has some special morphological features, like the modern built tombs in Thrace. The tomb dates to the end of the 4th century BC.

== Description ==
An accidental excavation brought to light a tomb from the early Hellenistic years (4th century BC), a Thracian underground tomb and is believed to be a family tomb. It is built of gravel and carved cornerstones from the quarry of Metaxades. At the bottom of the chamber there is a bed and on the floor a tomb. In 1976, after the visit of archaeologist G. Bakalakis, fixing and fencing works were carried out. Today it's an attraction of the settlements of Dafni and Elafochori.
