= 383 =

383 most commonly refers to:

- 383 (number), the natural number following 382 and preceding 384.
- AD 383, a year
- 383 BC, a year

383 may also refer to:

== Astronomy ==
- 383 Janina, a Themistian asteroid
- Abell 383, a galaxy cluster
- HOPS 383, a class 0 protostar
- NGC 383, a double radio galaxy

== Buildings ==
- 383 Madison Avenue, an office building in New York City, United States
- Stalag 383, a German WW2 prisoner of war camp

== Manuscripts ==
- Minuscule 383, a Greek manuscript of the New Testament

== Transportation ==
=== Flights and routes ===
- American Airlines Flight 383 (1965), a Boeing 727 which crashed on approach to Cincinnati
- American Airlines Flight 383 (2016), a Boeing 767 which caught fire leaving Chicago O'Hare airport
- List of highways numbered 383

=== Engines ===
- Chrysler 383 B engine

=== Watercraft ===
- BRP Ismael Lomibao (PC-383), a Jose Andrada-class coastal patrol boat
- KRI Imam Bonjol (383), a Parchim-class corvette
- USS City of Lewes (SP-383), an American minesweeper and patrol vessel
- USS Pampanito (SS-383), a Balao-class submarine
- USS Surfbird (AM-383), an Auk-class minesweeper

== Weapons ==
- Bersa Model 383a, an Argentinian small semi-automatic pistol

== See also ==
- 383rd (disambiguation)
