= 456th =

456th may refer to:

- 456th Bombardment Group, air combat unit of the United States Army Air Forces during the Second World War
- 456th Bombardment Squadron, inactive United States Air Force unit
- 456th Bombardment Wing, inactive United States Air Force unit
- 456th Fighter-Interceptor Squadron, inactive United States Air Force unit

== See also ==
- 456 (number)
- 456 (disambiguation)
- 456, the year 456 (CDLVI) of the Julian calendar
- 456 BC
