= 388th Division =

388th Division may refer to:

- 388th Field Training Division, Wehrmacht, Germany
- 388th Rifle Division, Soviet Union

== See also ==
- List of military divisions by number
- 388th (disambiguation)
