= 456 (disambiguation) =

456 may refer to:

- The year 456 AD
- The year 456 BC
- The year 456 AH in the Islamic calendar
- British Rail Class 456, an electric multiple unit passenger train
- Ferrari 456, a grand tourer
- Seong Gi-hun of Squid Game
- The 4, 5, 6 IRT Lexington Avenue Line
- The 456, a race of aliens in the BBC science fiction series Torchwood
- 456 (album), a 1992 album by The Grid
- 4,5,6, a 1995 album by Kool G Rap
- "4, 5, 6", a 1999 song by Solé
- Cee-lo, a dice game also known as Four-Five-Six

== See also ==
- 456th (disambiguation)
