= 360 BC =

360 BC in various calendars
Gregorian calendar	360 BC; CCCLX BC
Ab urbe condita	394
Ancient Egypt era	XXX dynasty, 21
Pharaoh	Nectanebo II, 1
Ancient Greek Olympiad (summer)	105th Olympiad (victor)¹
Assyrian calendar	4391
Balinese saka calendar	N/A
Bengali calendar	−953 – −952
Berber calendar	591
Buddhist calendar	185
Burmese calendar	−997
Byzantine calendar	5149–5150
Chinese calendar	庚申年 (Metal Monkey); 2338 or 2131 — to — 辛酉年 (Metal Rooster); 2339 or 2132
Coptic calendar	−643 – −642
Discordian calendar	807
Ethiopian calendar	−367 – −366
Hebrew calendar	3401–3402
- Hindu calendars
Vikram Samvat	−303 – −302
Shaka Samvat	N/A
Kali Yuga	2741–2742
Holocene calendar	9641
Iranian calendar	981 BP – 980 BP
Islamic calendar	1011 BH – 1010 BH
Javanese calendar	N/A
Julian calendar	N/A
Korean calendar	1974
Minguo calendar	2271 before ROC 民前2271年
Nanakshahi calendar	−1827
Thai solar calendar	183–184
Tibetan calendar	阳金猴年 (male Iron-Monkey) −233 or −614 or −1386 — to — 阴金鸡年 (female Iron-Rooster) −232 or −613 or −1385

Year 360 BC was a year of the pre-Julian Roman calendar. At the time, it was known as the Year of the Consulship of Ambustus and Visolus (or, less frequently, year 394 Ab urbe condita). The denomination 360 BC for this year has been used since the early medieval period, when the Anno Domini calendar era became the prevalent method in Europe for naming years.

== Events ==
=== By place ===
==== Egypt ====
- With the help of King Agesilaus II of Sparta, Nectanebo II deposes Teos and becomes king of Egypt. Teos flees to Susa and makes peace with the Persians. Nectanebo II pays the Spartans 230 talents for their help.

==== Judea ====
- Jerusalem has been rebuilt and the power of Judaism's hereditary priesthood is firmly established.

==== Greece ====
- The King of Sparta, Agesilaus II, dies at Cyrene, Cyrenaica, on his way home to Greece from Egypt. He is succeeded by his son Archidamus III as Eurypontid king of Sparta.
- As the Illyrians attack the Molossians, the Molossian king Arymbas brings his non-combatant people to safety elsewhere. When the Illyrians have finished looting, they are burdened with booty and are thus easily defeated by the Molossians.

==== Roman Republic ====
- The Gauls again reach the gates of Rome, but are beaten back.

=== By topic ===
==== Literature ====
- Plato writes the dialogues Timaeus and Critias, first mentioning Atlantis.

== Births ==
- Callisthenes of Olynthus, Greek historian (d. 327 BC)
- Lysimachus, Macedonian diadochus (d. 281 BC)
- Pyrrho of Elis, Greek skeptic philosopher (d. c. 270 BC)

== Deaths ==
- Agesilaus II, Eurypontid king of Sparta (b. c.444 BC)
