= 385 BC =

385 BC in various calendars
Gregorian calendar	385 BC; CCCLXXXV BC
Ab urbe condita	369
Ancient Egypt era	XXIX dynasty, 14
Pharaoh	Hakor, 9
Ancient Greek Olympiad (summer)	98th Olympiad, year 4
Assyrian calendar	4366
Balinese saka calendar	N/A
Bengali calendar	−978 – −977
Berber calendar	566
Buddhist calendar	160
Burmese calendar	−1022
Byzantine calendar	5124–5125
Chinese calendar	乙未年 (Wood Goat); 2313 or 2106 — to — 丙申年 (Fire Monkey); 2314 or 2107
Coptic calendar	−668 – −667
Discordian calendar	782
Ethiopian calendar	−392 – −391
Hebrew calendar	3376–3377
- Hindu calendars
Vikram Samvat	−328 – −327
Shaka Samvat	N/A
Kali Yuga	2716–2717
Holocene calendar	9616
Iranian calendar	1006 BP – 1005 BP
Islamic calendar	1037 BH – 1036 BH
Javanese calendar	N/A
Julian calendar	N/A
Korean calendar	1949
Minguo calendar	2296 before ROC 民前2296年
Nanakshahi calendar	−1852
Thai solar calendar	158–159
Tibetan calendar	阴木羊年 (female Wood-Goat) −258 or −639 or −1411 — to — 阳火猴年 (male Fire-Monkey) −257 or −638 or −1410

Year 385 BC was a year of the pre-Julian Roman calendar. At the time, it was known as the Year of the Tribunate of Capitolinus, Cornelius, Capitolinus, Papirius, Capitolinus and Fidenas (or, less frequently, year 369 Ab urbe condita). The denomination 385 BC for this year has been used since the early medieval period, when the Anno Domini calendar era became the prevalent method in Europe for naming years.

== Events ==
=== By place ===
==== Greece ====
- Jason of Pherae becomes tyrant of Thessaly.
- Dionysius I of Syracuse attempts to restore Alcetas I of Epirus to the throne.
- Bardyllis becomes king of Illyria and the Dardani and establishes the Bardyllian Dynasty.
- Mantinea gets destroyed by Sparta and their subdued thebans allies.

=== By topic ===
==== Education ====
- Plato forms his Academy, teaching mathematics, astronomy and other sciences as well as philosophy. It is dedicated to the Attic hero Academus. Philanthropists bear all costs; students pay no fees.

==== Astronomy ====
- Democritus announces that the Milky Way is composed of many stars.

== Births ==
- Mentor of Rhodes, Greek mercenary and satrap (approximate date)

== Deaths ==
- Camissares, Persian satrap of Cilicia
- Chuzi II, Chinese ruler of the Zhou Dynasty (approximate date)
