= 397 BC =

397 BC in various calendars
- Gregorian calendar: 397 BC; CCCXCVII BC
- Ab urbe condita: 357
- Ancient Egypt era: XXIX dynasty, 2
- Pharaoh: Nepherites I, 2
- Ancient Greek Olympiad (summer): 95th Olympiad, year 4
- Assyrian calendar: 4354
- Balinese saka calendar: N/A
- Bengali calendar: −990 – −989
- Berber calendar: 554
- Buddhist calendar: 148
- Burmese calendar: −1034
- Byzantine calendar: 5112–5113
- Chinese calendar: 癸未年 (Water Goat); 2301 or 2094 — to — 甲申年 (Wood Monkey); 2302 or 2095
- Coptic calendar: −680 – −679
- Discordian calendar: 770
- Ethiopian calendar: −404 – −403
- Hebrew calendar: 3364–3365
- Hindu calendars
- Vikram Samvat: −340 – −339
- Shaka Samvat: N/A
- Kali Yuga: 2704–2705
- Holocene calendar: 9604
- Iranian calendar: 1018 BP – 1017 BP
- Islamic calendar: 1049 BH – 1048 BH
- Javanese calendar: N/A
- Julian calendar: N/A
- Korean calendar: 1937
- Minguo calendar: 2308 before ROC 民前2308年
- Nanakshahi calendar: −1864
- Thai solar calendar: 146–147
- Tibetan calendar: ཆུ་མོ་ལུག་ལོ་ (female Water-Sheep) −270 or −651 or −1423 — to — ཤིང་ཕོ་སྤྲེ་ལོ་ (male Wood-Monkey) −269 or −650 or −1422

Year 397 BC was a year of the pre-Julian Roman calendar. At the time, it was known as the Year of the Tribunate of Iullus, Albinus, Medullinus, Maluginensis, Fidenas and Capitolinus (or, less frequently, year 357 Ab urbe condita). The denomination 397 BC for this year has been used since the early medieval period, when the Anno Domini calendar era became the prevalent method in Europe for naming years.

== Events ==
=== By place ===
==== Greece ====
- Called on by the Ionians to assist them against the Persian King Artaxerxes II, King Agesilaus II of Sparta launches an ambitious campaign in Asia Minor.

==== Carthage ====
- Siege of Syracuse: A Carthaginian expeditionary army (some 50,000 men) under Himilco crosses to Sicily. They conquer the north coast and put Dionysius I, tyrant of Syracuse, on the defensive and besiege Syracuse. However, the Carthaginian army suffers from the plague. The Syracuse counterattacked and completely defeat Himilco's army. Himilco has to escape back to Carthage.
- The Carthaginians establish the town of Lilybaeum in Sicily to replace Motya.

== Births ==
- Dionysius II, son of Dionysius I, tyrant of Syracuse (d. 343 BC)
