= 324 BC =

324 BC in various calendars
Gregorian calendar	324 BC; CCCXXIV BC
Ab urbe condita	430
Ancient Egypt era	XXXII dynasty, 9
Pharaoh	Alexander the Great, 9
Ancient Greek Olympiad (summer)	114th Olympiad (victor)¹
Assyrian calendar	4427
Balinese saka calendar	N/A
Bengali calendar	−917 – −916
Berber calendar	627
Buddhist calendar	221
Burmese calendar	−961
Byzantine calendar	5185–5186
Chinese calendar	丙申年 (Fire Monkey); 2374 or 2167 — to — 丁酉年 (Fire Rooster); 2375 or 2168
Coptic calendar	−607 – −606
Discordian calendar	843
Ethiopian calendar	−331 – −330
Hebrew calendar	3437–3438
- Hindu calendars
Vikram Samvat	−267 – −266
Shaka Samvat	N/A
Kali Yuga	2777–2778
Holocene calendar	9677
Iranian calendar	945 BP – 944 BP
Islamic calendar	974 BH – 973 BH
Javanese calendar	N/A
Julian calendar	N/A
Korean calendar	2010
Minguo calendar	2235 before ROC 民前2235年
Nanakshahi calendar	−1791
Thai solar calendar	219–220
Tibetan calendar	阳火猴年 (male Fire-Monkey) −197 or −578 or −1350 — to — 阴火鸡年 (female Fire-Rooster) −196 or −577 or −1349

Year 324 BC was a year of the pre-Julian Roman calendar. At the time, it was known as the Year of the Dictatorship of Cursor (or, less frequently, year 430 Ab urbe condita). The denomination 324 BC for this year has been used since the early medieval period, when the Anno Domini calendar era became the prevalent method in Europe for naming years.

== Events ==
=== By place ===
==== Macedonian Empire ====
- On returning to Susa, Persia, Alexander the Great punishes those who he considers to have failed in their duties in his absence in India, particularly those who have plundered tombs and temples. Alexander continues his policy of replacing senior officials and executing defaulting governors. Over a third of his satraps are replaced and six are put to death. Three generals in Media, including Cleander, the brother of Coenus (who died in 326 BC), are accused of extortion and are arrested, tried and executed.
- While at Susa, Alexander holds a feast to celebrate his capture of the Persian Empire.
- To further his policy of integrating the Macedonians and Persians, Alexander and 80 of his officers take Persian wives. He and Hephaestion marry Darius III's daughters Barsine (also called Stateira) and Drypteis, respectively, and 10,000 of his soldiers with native wives are given generous dowries. His determination to incorporate Persians on equal terms into his army and into the administration of the provinces is bitterly resented by the Macedonians.
- Alexander the Great spends the summer and autumn at the Median capital, Ecbatana, where his best friend, Hephaistion, dies during the autumn. Alexander indulges in extravagant mourning for his closest friend.
- Winter – Alexander carries out a savage punitive expedition against the Cossaeans in the hills of Luristan.

==== Greece ====
- Alexander the Great's treasurer, Harpalus, fearing arrest, flees from Susa to Athens. On arriving in Athens, he is imprisoned by the Athenians after a proposal of Demosthenes and Phocion, despite Hypereides' opposition, who wanted an immediate uprising against Alexander. Harpalus brings with him considerable wealth collected from the spoils of Alexander's conquest of Asia. This money is entrusted to a committee led by Demosthenes.
- Dinarchus, a professional speech writer in Athens, comes to prominence in the scandal that follows the flight to Athens of Alexander the Great's treasurer, Harpalus. When Harpalus escapes and flees to Crete, Dinarchus writes the prosecution speeches against Demosthenes, Demades, Aristogiton, Philocles and other well-known politicians accused of misappropriating some of this money.
- Demosthenes is convicted and imprisoned after being found guilty of misappropriating some of the funds that Alexander's treasurer, Harpalus, has brought with him. He escapes into exile, although his sentence is soon repealed. Although Hypereides has supported Demosthenes in his struggle against the Macedonians, that support is withdrawn after the Harpalus affair. After Demosthenes' exile, Hypereides becomes the head of the patriotic party in Athens.
- Greek colonists found the city of Akra Leuka (modern Alicante, Spain) on the Mediterranean coast of the Iberian Peninsula.

== Births ==
- Antiochus I Soter, King of the Seleucid dynasty (d. 261 BC)

== Deaths ==
- October – Hephaestion, son of Amyntor, a Macedonian general, soldier, aristocrat, and possibly lover of Alexander the Great (b. c. 356 BC).
