= 308 BC =

308 BC in various calendars
- Gregorian calendar: 308 BC; CCCVIII BC
- Ab urbe condita: 446
- Ancient Egypt era: XXXIII dynasty, 16
- Pharaoh: Ptolemy I Soter, 16
- Ancient Greek Olympiad (summer): 118th Olympiad (victor)¹
- Assyrian calendar: 4443
- Balinese saka calendar: N/A
- Bengali calendar: −901 – −900
- Berber calendar: 643
- Buddhist calendar: 237
- Burmese calendar: −945
- Byzantine calendar: 5201–5202
- Chinese calendar: 壬子年 (Water Rat); 2390 or 2183 — to — 癸丑年 (Water Ox); 2391 or 2184
- Coptic calendar: −591 – −590
- Discordian calendar: 859
- Ethiopian calendar: −315 – −314
- Hebrew calendar: 3453–3454
- Hindu calendars
- Vikram Samvat: −251 – −250
- Shaka Samvat: N/A
- Kali Yuga: 2793–2794
- Holocene calendar: 9693
- Iranian calendar: 929 BP – 928 BP
- Islamic calendar: 958 BH – 957 BH
- Javanese calendar: N/A
- Julian calendar: N/A
- Korean calendar: 2026
- Minguo calendar: 2219 before ROC 民前2219年
- Nanakshahi calendar: −1775
- Seleucid era: 4/5 AG
- Thai solar calendar: 235–236
- Tibetan calendar: ཆུ་ཕོ་བྱི་བ་ལོ་ (male Water-Rat) −181 or −562 or −1334 — to — ཆུ་མོ་གླང་ལོ་ (female Water-Ox) −180 or −561 or −1333

Year 308 BC was a year of the pre-Julian Roman calendar. At the time, it was known as the Year of the Consulship of Mus and Rullianus (or, less frequently, year 446 Ab urbe condita). The denomination 308 BC for this year has been used since the early medieval period, when the Anno Domini calendar era became the prevalent method in Europe for naming years.

== Events ==
=== By place ===
==== Mesopotamia/Babylonia ====
- Antigonus marches his main army east to confront Seleucus. The Antigonid and Seleucid armies meet somewhere in southern Mesopotamia or northern Babylonia and a battle is fought to a draw. The next morning Seleucus launches a surprise attack on Antigonus' camp and wins a simple victory. After his defeat Antigonus gives up on his ambitions to reconquer the eastern provinces.
- Seleucus marches east and continues his conquest of the eastern provinces of the Macedonian Empire; the so-called Upper Satrapies.

==== Greece ====
- Ptolemy crosses from Asia Minor into Greece, where he takes possession of Corinth, Sicyon and Megara.
- Ptolemy makes peace with Cassander
- Cleopatra of Macedon is assassinated by the order of Antigonus

==== Italy ====
- The Second Samnite War escalates when the tribes of the central Apennines, the Umbrians, Picentes, and Marsians join the war against Rome. However, Rome is able to control the uprising.
- The Etruscans sue for peace with Rome, which is granted by the Romans on severe terms.

==== North Africa ====
- The Carthaginians send out an army to coerce the Zuphones, a Numidian tribe, back into their alliance with Carthage; they are successful in their endeavour.
- Agathocles leaves his main army under the command of his son Archagathus encamped before Tunis while he, with a strikeforce of 8,000 infantry, 800 cavalry and 50 chariots, marches after the Carthaginian army.
- The Carthaginians send the Numidians to harass Agathocles' strike force, the skirmishing draws in more and more troops until it eventually leads to a battle which is won by Agathocles.
- While Agathocles was in pursuit of the defeated Carthaginian army, the Numidians (who had retreated from the battle earlier on) attack his camp and ride off with a part of his army's booty. Agathocles returns to his camp, divides what is left of the booty (so no one can complain) and sets up a victory trophy.
- Agathocles sends Orthon the Syracusan to Cyrene to request aid in subduing Carthage from Ophellas (Ptolemy's governor of Cyrenaica).
- Ophellas recruits an army of 10,000 infantry, 600 cavalry and 100 chariots for his campaign in support of Agathocles.
- After an arduous march from Cyrenaica to Carthaginian Libya Ophellas' forces link up with Agathocles' army.
- Agathocles lures Ophellas into a false sense of security and launches a surprise attack on his camp. Ophellas is killed in the fighting and Agathocles takes over Ophellas' army, adding its numbers to his own.
- While the Carthaginian army is away from the city, Bomilcar tries to make himself tyrant of Carthage. He fails and is executed.

== Births ==
- Hiero II, Greek Sicilian tyrant and king of Syracuse (approximate date)
- Zhao Sheng, Chinese chancellor of the Zhao State (approximate date)

== Deaths ==
- Cleopatra of Macedon, sister of Alexander the Great and daughter of King Philip II of Macedon and Olympias (b. c. 356 BC)
- Ophellas, ruler of Cyrenaica (governor for Ptolemy).
