= 388th =

388th may refer to:

- 388th Electronic Warfare Squadron, United States Air Force unit located at Eglin Air Force Base, Florida
- 388th Fighter Squadron or 132nd Fighter Wing (132d W), United States Air Force unit assigned to the Iowa Air National Guard, located at Des Moines International Airport, Iowa
- 388th Fighter Wing, 4th Fighter Squadron (4 FS), conducts flying operations and equipment maintenance to maintain combat readiness of an 18-aircraft F-16C LANTIRN squadron
- 388th Operations Group, the flying component of the 388th Fighter Wing, assigned to the Air Combat Command Twelfth Air Force

== See also ==
- 388 (number)
- 388, the year 388 (CCCLXXXVIII) of the Julian calendar
- 388 BC
