= 327 BC =

327 BC in various calendars
| Gregorian calendar | 327 BC; CCCXXVII BC |
| Ab urbe condita | 427 |
| Ancient Egypt era | XXXII dynasty, 6 |
| Pharaoh | Alexander the Great, 6 |
| Ancient Greek Olympiad (summer) | 113th Olympiad, year 2 |
| Assyrian calendar | 4424 |
| Balinese saka calendar | N/A |
| Bengali calendar | −920 – −919 |
| Berber calendar | 624 |
| Buddhist calendar | 218 |
| Burmese calendar | −964 |
| Byzantine calendar | 5182–5183 |
| Chinese calendar | 癸巳年 (Water Snake); 2371 or 2164 — to — 甲午年 (Wood Horse); 2372 or 2165 |
| Coptic calendar | −610 – −609 |
| Discordian calendar | 840 |
| Ethiopian calendar | −334 – −333 |
| Hebrew calendar | 3434–3435 |
- Hindu calendars
| Vikram Samvat | −270 – −269 |
| Shaka Samvat | N/A |
| Kali Yuga | 2774–2775 |
| Holocene calendar | 9674 |
| Iranian calendar | 948 BP – 947 BP |
| Islamic calendar | 977 BH – 976 BH |
| Javanese calendar | N/A |
| Julian calendar | N/A |
| Korean calendar | 2007 |
| Minguo calendar | 2238 before ROC 民前2238年 |
| Nanakshahi calendar | −1794 |
| Thai solar calendar | 216–217 |
| Tibetan calendar | 阴水蛇年 (female Water-Snake) −200 or −581 or −1353 — to — 阳木马年 (male Wood-Horse) −199 or −580 or −1352 |

Year 327 BC was a year of the pre-Julian Roman calendar. At the time, it was known as the Year of the Consulship of Lentulus and Philo (or, less frequently, year 427 Ab urbe condita). The denomination 327 BC for this year has been used since the early medieval period, when the Anno Domini calendar era became the prevalent method in Europe for naming years.

== Events ==
=== By place ===
==== Macedonian Empire ====
- Alexander the Great invades northern India. Recrossing the Hindu Kush, Alexander divides his forces. Half the army with the baggage under Hephaestion and Perdiccas, both cavalry commanders, are sent through the Khyber Pass, while Alexander leads the rest, together with his siege train, through the hills to the north. His advance through Swat and Gandhara is marked by the storming of the almost impregnable pinnacle of Aornos, a few miles west of the Indus.
- The relations between Alexander and Aristotle are embittered by the execution of Aristotle's nephew, the historian Callisthenes of Olynthus, who is charged with treason. Callisthenes has been accompanying Alexander to write a chronicle of the campaign.

==== Roman Republic ====
- The Samnite army captures Neapolis (present-day Naples). The Romans, who are meanwhile moving south while the Samnites are occupied with Tarentum, take the opportunity to recover Neapolis and, after a long siege, evict the Samnite garrison from the city and make it an ally of Rome.

== Births ==
- Heracles, illegitimate son of Alexander the Great by his mistress Barsine, daughter of Satrap Artabazus of Phrygia and later claimant to the throne of Macedon (d. 309 BC)
- Moggaliputta-Tissa, Indian Buddhist monk, scholar and philosopher (approximate date)

== Deaths ==
- Callisthenes of Olynthus, Greek historian, great nephew and pupil of Aristotle (b. c. 360 BC)
