= 343 BC =

343 BC in various calendars
- Gregorian calendar: 343 BC; CCCXLIII BC
- Ab urbe condita: 411
- Ancient Egypt era: XXXI dynasty, 1
- Pharaoh: Artaxerxes III of Persia, 1
- Ancient Greek Olympiad (summer): 109th Olympiad, year 2
- Assyrian calendar: 4408
- Balinese saka calendar: N/A
- Bengali calendar: −936 – −935
- Berber calendar: 608
- Buddhist calendar: 202
- Burmese calendar: −980
- Byzantine calendar: 5166–5167
- Chinese calendar: 丁丑年 (Fire Ox); 2355 or 2148 — to — 戊寅年 (Earth Tiger); 2356 or 2149
- Coptic calendar: −626 – −625
- Discordian calendar: 824
- Ethiopian calendar: −350 – −349
- Hebrew calendar: 3418–3419
- Hindu calendars
- Vikram Samvat: −286 – −285
- Shaka Samvat: N/A
- Kali Yuga: 2758–2759
- Holocene calendar: 9658
- Iranian calendar: 964 BP – 963 BP
- Islamic calendar: 994 BH – 993 BH
- Javanese calendar: N/A
- Julian calendar: N/A
- Korean calendar: 1991
- Minguo calendar: 2254 before ROC 民前2254年
- Nanakshahi calendar: −1810
- Thai solar calendar: 200–201
- Tibetan calendar: མེ་མོ་གླང་ལོ་ (female Fire-Ox) −216 or −597 or −1369 — to — ས་ཕོ་སྟག་ལོ་ (male Earth-Tiger) −215 or −596 or −1368

Year 343 BC was a year of the pre-Julian Roman calendar. At the time it was known as the Year of the Consulship of Corvus and Arvina (or, less frequently, year 411 Ab urbe condita). The denomination 343 BC for this year has been used since the early medieval period, when the Anno Domini calendar era became the prevalent method in Europe for naming years.

== Events ==
=== By place ===
==== Persian Empire ====
- The King of Persia, Artaxerxes III, personally leads the Persian forces invading Egypt. The Persians are keen to access Egypt's gold and corn supplies. The town of Pelusium in the Nile Delta puts up resistance, but Pharaoh Nectanebo II is forced to retreat to Memphis. As the situation deteriorates, Nectanebo II leaves for exile in Nubia. His departure marks the end of the 30th Dynasty, the last native house to rule Egypt.
- With Nectanebo II's flight, all organised resistance to the Persians collapses, and Egypt is once again reduced to a satrapy of the Persian Empire. A Persian satrap is put in place in Egypt. The walls of the country's cities are destroyed and its temples are plundered. Artaxerxes and his commander-in-chief, General Bagoas, leave Egypt loaded with treasure.

==== Greece ====
- The Athenian statesman Demosthenes has Aeschines indicted for treason. However, Aeschines drags up the inappropriate past of one of Demosthenes' associates, Timarchus and is acquitted by a narrow margin.
- King Philip II of Macedon again marches against Cersobleptes, King of Thrace, defeats him in several battles, and reduces him to the condition of being a tributary.
- Phalaikos unsuccessfully lays siege to Kydonia on the island of Crete.

==== Italy ====
- The native Italian tribes, the Lucanians and Bruttians, press down upon the Greek colonies of Magna Graecia, including Tarentum. Responding to calls for help from these former Greek colonies, King Archidamus III of Sparta sets sail with a band of mercenaries for Italy.
- After his surrender to the Corinthian general Timoleon, who takes over as ruler of Syracuse, the former tyrant, Dionysius II, is allowed to retire to Corinth to live in exile, although he dies within the year. The Syracusan constitution is changed by Timoleon with the new constitution designed to have safeguards against tyranny. Timoleon invites new settlers from Greece to come to Sicily.

==== Roman Republic ====
- First Samnite War began when Rome fought the confederated Samnites over disputed territory in the Middle Liris Valley.

== Births ==
- Philetaerus, founder of the Attalid dynasty of Pergamum in Anatolia (approximate date) (d. 263 BC)

== Deaths ==
- Dionysius II, tyrant of Syracuse (b. c. 397 BC)
