= 304 BC =

304 BC in various calendars
- Gregorian calendar: 304 BC; CCCIV BC
- Ab urbe condita: 450
- Ancient Egypt era: XXXIII dynasty, 20
- Pharaoh: Ptolemy I Soter, 20
- Ancient Greek Olympiad (summer): 119th Olympiad (victor)¹
- Assyrian calendar: 4447
- Balinese saka calendar: N/A
- Bengali calendar: −897 – −896
- Berber calendar: 647
- Buddhist calendar: 241
- Burmese calendar: −941
- Byzantine calendar: 5205–5206
- Chinese calendar: 丙辰年 (Fire Dragon); 2394 or 2187 — to — 丁巳年 (Fire Snake); 2395 or 2188
- Coptic calendar: −587 – −586
- Discordian calendar: 863
- Ethiopian calendar: −311 – −310
- Hebrew calendar: 3457–3458
- Hindu calendars
- Vikram Samvat: −247 – −246
- Shaka Samvat: N/A
- Kali Yuga: 2797–2798
- Holocene calendar: 9697
- Iranian calendar: 925 BP – 924 BP
- Islamic calendar: 953 BH – 952 BH
- Javanese calendar: N/A
- Julian calendar: N/A
- Korean calendar: 2030
- Minguo calendar: 2215 before ROC 民前2215年
- Nanakshahi calendar: −1771
- Seleucid era: 8/9 AG
- Thai solar calendar: 239–240
- Tibetan calendar: མེ་ཕོ་འབྲུག་ལོ་ (male Fire-Dragon) −177 or −558 or −1330 — to — མེ་མོ་སྦྲུལ་ལོ་ (female Fire-Snake) −176 or −557 or −1329

Year 304 BC was a year of the pre-Julian Roman calendar. At the time, it was known as the Year of the Consulship of Sophus and Saverrio (or, less frequently, year 450 Ab urbe condita). The denomination 304 BC for this year has been used since the early medieval period, when the Anno Domini calendar era became the prevalent method in Europe for naming years.

== Events ==
=== By place ===
==== Greece ====
- Demetrius shows ingenuity in devising a new siege engine: a wheeled siege tower named Helepolis (or "Taker of Cities"), which stands 40 meters tall and 20 meters wide and weighs 180 tons.
- The Siege of Rhodes ends after a year.
- Demetrius Poliorcetes and the Rhodians come to a truce, with the agreement that the city should be autonomous, should keep its own revenue and that the Rhodians should be allies of Antigonus unless he is at war with Ptolemy.
- Antigonus then concludes a peace treaty and an alliance with the island state, guaranteeing it autonomy and neutrality in his conflicts with Ptolemy.
- Cassander invades Attica and besieges Athens. He captures the island of Salamis off the coast of Athens.
- Demetrius Poliorcetes invades mainland Greece for Asia-Minor, drives Cassander out of central Greece and liberates Athens. In return, the Athenians bestow on him a new religious honour, synnaos (meaning "having the same temple") of the temple of the goddess Athena.

==== Roman Republic ====
- The second Samnite war formally ends with a peace agreement in which the Samnites obtain peace on terms that are severe but not as crushing as those agreed by the Romans with the Etruscans four years earlier. Under the peace, Rome gains no territory, but the Samnites renounce their hegemony over Campania. Rome is also successful in ending the revolts amongst the tribes surrounding Roman territory.

==== Sicily ====
- The tyrant Agathocles of Syracuse takes on the title of King of Sicily. He extends his influence into southern Italy and the Adriatic.

==== India ====
- The Mauryan emperor Chandragupta defeats Seleucus I Nicator as he tries to invade India.

== Births ==
- Ashoka, Indian emperor and ruler of the Maurya Empire in present-day Eastern India 268–232 BC (d. 232 BC)
- Erasistratus, Greek anatomist and physician (approximate date)

== In popular culture ==
- 450 Ab urbe condita is the starting year for the Imperator: Rome grand strategy computer game.
