= 383rd =

383rd or 383d may refer to:

- 383d Bombardment Group, inactive United States Air Force unit
- 383d Bombardment Squadron or 133d Air Refueling Squadron, unit of the New Hampshire Air National Guard 157th Air Refueling Wing
- 383d Fighter Squadron, inactive United States Air Force unit
- 383rd Rifle Division (Soviet Union), a formation of the Red Army created during the Second World War

== See also ==
- 383 (disambiguation)
