= 309 BC =

309 BC in various calendars
Gregorian calendar	309 BC; CCCIX BC
Ab urbe condita	445
Ancient Egypt era	XXXIII dynasty, 15
Pharaoh	Ptolemy I Soter, 15
Ancient Greek Olympiad (summer)	117th Olympiad, year 4
Assyrian calendar	4442
Balinese saka calendar	N/A
Bengali calendar	−902 – −901
Berber calendar	642
Buddhist calendar	236
Burmese calendar	−946
Byzantine calendar	5200–5201
Chinese calendar	辛亥年 (Metal Pig); 2389 or 2182 — to — 壬子年 (Water Rat); 2390 or 2183
Coptic calendar	−592 – −591
Discordian calendar	858
Ethiopian calendar	−316 – −315
Hebrew calendar	3452–3453
- Hindu calendars
Vikram Samvat	−252 – −251
Shaka Samvat	N/A
Kali Yuga	2792–2793
Holocene calendar	9692
Iranian calendar	930 BP – 929 BP
Islamic calendar	959 BH – 958 BH
Javanese calendar	N/A
Julian calendar	N/A
Korean calendar	2025
Minguo calendar	2220 before ROC 民前2220年
Nanakshahi calendar	−1776
Seleucid era	3/4 AG
Thai solar calendar	234–235
Tibetan calendar	阴金猪年 (female Iron-Pig) −182 or −563 or −1335 — to — 阳水鼠年 (male Water-Rat) −181 or −562 or −1334

Year 309 BC was a year of the pre-Julian Roman calendar. At the time, it was known as the Year of the Dictatorship of Cursor (or, less frequently, year 445 Ab urbe condita). The denomination 309 BC for this year has been used since the early medieval period, when the Anno Domini calendar era became the prevalent method in Europe for naming years.

== Events ==
=== By place ===
==== Asia Minor ====
- Ptolemy I Soter personally commands a fleet that takes the coastal regions of Lycia and Caria from Antigonus I Monophthalmus, capturing the cities of Phaselis, Xanthos, Kaunos, Iasos and Myndus.

==== Thrace ====
- Lysimachus, the Macedonian ruler of Thrace and one of diadochi, founds the city of Lysimachia on the north-western extremity of the Thracian Chersonese (the modern Gallipoli peninsula) to serve as his capital.

==== Greece ====
- Cassander, who has held Roxana, widow of Alexander the Great, in prison for a number of years, has her put to death along with her young son Alexander, the nominal King Alexander IV of Macedon.
- Antigonus attempts to renew his alliance with the Macedonian general and former regent Polyperchon, who still controls part of the Peloponnesus. He sends Heracles, the illegitimate son of Alexander the Great, to Polyperchon to be treated as a pretender to the throne of Macedonia.
- Polyperchon manages to form an army consisting of 20,000 infantry and 1,000 cavalry and challenges Cassander's army. Instead of fighting, Cassander starts negotiations with Polyperchon. By offering to make him a general of his own army and placing him as governor of Peloponnesus, he convinces Polyperchon to change allegiance to him instead of Heracles. As a result, Polyperchon murders Heracles and his mother Barsine.
- Areus I succeeds his grandfather Cleomenes II as king of Sparta.
- A census is carried out in Athens. 21,000 citizens, 10,000 foreign residents and 400,000 others – women, children and slaves – are living in the city.
- Ptolemy arrives at Kos and sends for Ptolemaeus (the nephew of Antigonus – who has revolted against Antigonus) to join him to discuss strategy. After finding out Ptolemaeus plans to take over his army and fleet, Ptolemy forces him to commit suicide.

==== Carthage ====
- Since 480 BC, an aristocratic Council of Elders has effectively ruled Carthage. The titular king of Carthage, Bomilcar, attempts a coup to restore the monarchy to full power. His attempt fails, which leads to Carthage becoming, in name as well as in fact, a republic.
- Leaving his brother Antander to continue the defence of Syracuse, Agathocles lands in North Africa with the aim of distracting the Carthaginians from their siege of Syracuse. Agathocles concludes a treaty with Ophellas, ruler of Cyrenaica. He then takes advantage of the civil unrest in Carthage and nearly succeeds in conquering the city.

==== Roman Republic ====
- The Samnites again rise against Rome. Lucius Papirius Cursor is appointed dictator for the second time and wins a great victory at Longula over the Samnites.

==== China ====
- Soon after the State of Qin has conquered the State of Shu (in modern-day Sichuan province), they employ the Shu engineer Bi Ling to create the Guanxian irrigation system, which will eventually provide for over five million people in an area of 40 to 50 square miles (130 km^{2}), still in use today.

== Births ==
- Ptolemy II Philadelphus, King of Egypt (d. 246 BC)

== Deaths ==
- King Alexander IV of Macedon (b. 323 BC)
- Cleomenes II, Agiad King of Sparta
- Heracles, illegitimate son of Alexander the Great and claimant to the throne of Macedon (b. 327 BC)
- Ptolemy (general) general of Antigonus I Monophthalmus
- Roxana, wife of Alexander the Great, and mother of Alexander IV of Macedon
- Zhang Yi, strategist of the Chinese state of Qin
