= 331 BC =

331 BC in various calendars
Gregorian calendar	331 BC; CCCXXXI BC
Ab urbe condita	423
Ancient Egypt era	XXXII dynasty, 2
Pharaoh	Alexander the Great, 2
Ancient Greek Olympiad (summer)	112th Olympiad, year 2
Assyrian calendar	4420
Balinese saka calendar	N/A
Bengali calendar	−924 – −923
Berber calendar	620
Buddhist calendar	214
Burmese calendar	−968
Byzantine calendar	5178–5179
Chinese calendar	己丑年 (Earth Ox); 2367 or 2160 — to — 庚寅年 (Metal Tiger); 2368 or 2161
Coptic calendar	−614 – −613
Discordian calendar	836
Ethiopian calendar	−338 – −337
Hebrew calendar	3430–3431
- Hindu calendars
Vikram Samvat	−274 – −273
Shaka Samvat	N/A
Kali Yuga	2770–2771
Holocene calendar	9670
Iranian calendar	952 BP – 951 BP
Islamic calendar	981 BH – 980 BH
Javanese calendar	N/A
Julian calendar	N/A
Korean calendar	2003
Minguo calendar	2242 before ROC 民前2242年
Nanakshahi calendar	−1798
Thai solar calendar	212–213
Tibetan calendar	阴土牛年 (female Earth-Ox) −204 or −585 or −1357 — to — 阳金虎年 (male Iron-Tiger) −203 or −584 or −1356

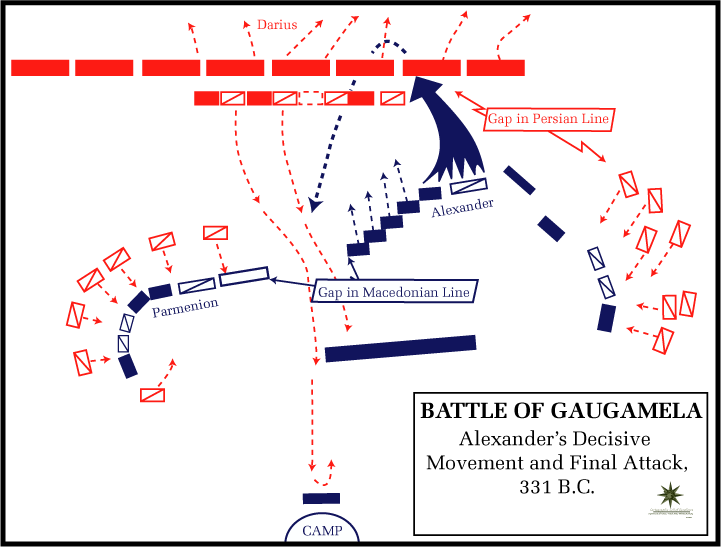
The Battle of Gaugamela

Year 331 BC was a year of the pre-Julian Roman calendar. At the time, it was known as the Year of the Consulship of Potitus and Marcellus (or, less frequently, year 423 Ab urbe condita). The denomination 331 BC for this year has been used since the early medieval period, when the Anno Domini calendar era became the prevalent method in Europe for naming years.

== Events ==
=== By place ===
==== Macedonia ====
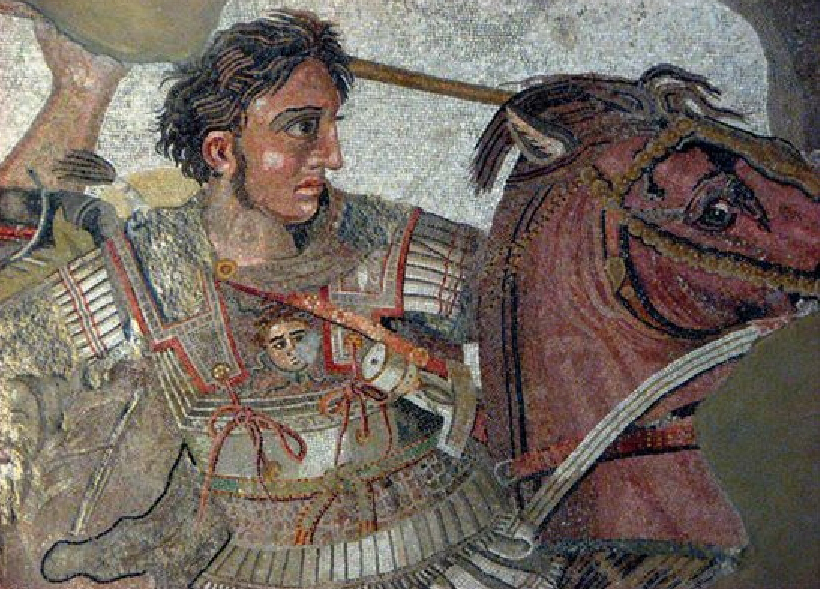
Alexander the Great is portrayed at the Battle of Gaugamela (331 BCE) on a mosaic found on the floor of the House of the Faun in Pompeii. He is astride his famous horse Bucephalos and wears a breastplate decorated with the head of Medusa.

- Late January – Alexander the Great travels with a small bodyguard (among them is the future Egyptian ruler Ptolemy I Soter) along the coastal road of Egypt and reaches the settlement of Paraetonium on the borders of Cyrenaica. There, he receives a delegation of emissaries from Cyrene, who grants him a number of gifts including fine horses and chariots. Alexander concludes a treaty of peace and alliance with them. He turns inland from the Mediterranean and travels through the Libyan Desert to the Siwah Oasis, which he reaches in late February. Alexander consults the famous oracle and is pronounced the son of Zeus-Ammon as his true father.
- Alexander departs from Egypt and leads his forces towards Phoenicia. He leaves Cleomenes of Naucratis as the ruling nomarch to control Egypt.
- October 1 – Alexander is victorious in the Battle of Gaugamela (near ancient Ninevah) over the Persian King Darius III. Alexander pursues the defeated Persian forces to Arbela, Darius moves his Bactrian cavalry and Greek mercenaries into Media.
- For the first time, Alexander encounters war elephants after the battle in Darius' camp. In the capital, Susa, Alexander gains access to huge treasures amounting to 50,000 gold talents (equivalent of today circa 77 billion USD).

==== Greece ====
- From Thapsacus on the Euphrastes River, Alexander led the Greek army toward the Tigris River, leading to a victory over the Persians on October 31 at Gaugamela, after which Darius fled and escaped.
- While Alexander is fighting in Asia, Agis III of Sparta, profiting from the Macedonian king's absence from Greece, leads some of the Greek cities in a revolt. With Persian money and 8,000 Greek mercenaries, he holds Crete against Macedonian forces. In the Peloponnesus he routs a force under the Macedonian general Coragus and, although Athens stays neutral, he is joined by Elis, Achaea (except Pellene) and Arcadia, with the exception of Megalopolis, the staunchly anti-Spartan capital of Arcadia, which Agis III's forces besiege.
- Alexander's regent Antipater leads the Macedonians to victory over King Agis III in the Battle of Megalopolis.

==== Italy ====
- Alexander of Epirus takes Heraclea from the Lucanians, and Terina and Sipontum from the Bruttii.
- Tarentum turns against Alexander of Epirus when they realize that he intends to create a kingdom of his own in southern Italy. Alexander is defeated and killed in the Battle of Pandosia on the banks of the Acheron.

==== Roman Republic ====
- The Gallic tribe of the Senones and the Romans conclude a peace and enter upon a period of friendly relations which lasts the rest of the century.

== Deaths ==
- Alexander I of Epirus, Aeacid dynasty king of Epirus (b. c. 370 BC)
- Vahe, legendary king of Armenia and last of the Hyke dynasty
