= 381 BC =

381 BC in various calendars
Gregorian calendar	381 BC; CCCLXXXI BC
Ab urbe condita	373
Ancient Egypt era	XXIX dynasty, 18
Pharaoh	Hakor, 13
Ancient Greek Olympiad (summer)	99th Olympiad, year 4
Assyrian calendar	4370
Balinese saka calendar	N/A
Bengali calendar	−974 – −973
Berber calendar	570
Buddhist calendar	164
Burmese calendar	−1018
Byzantine calendar	5128–5129
Chinese calendar	己亥年 (Earth Pig); 2317 or 2110 — to — 庚子年 (Metal Rat); 2318 or 2111
Coptic calendar	−664 – −663
Discordian calendar	786
Ethiopian calendar	−388 – −387
Hebrew calendar	3380–3381
- Hindu calendars
Vikram Samvat	−324 – −323
Shaka Samvat	N/A
Kali Yuga	2720–2721
Holocene calendar	9620
Iranian calendar	1002 BP – 1001 BP
Islamic calendar	1033 BH – 1032 BH
Javanese calendar	N/A
Julian calendar	N/A
Korean calendar	1953
Minguo calendar	2292 before ROC 民前2292年
Nanakshahi calendar	−1848
Thai solar calendar	162–163
Tibetan calendar	阴土猪年 (female Earth-Pig) −254 or −635 or −1407 — to — 阳金鼠年 (male Iron-Rat) −253 or −634 or −1406

Year 381 BC was a year of the pre-Julian Roman calendar. At the time, it was known as the Year of the Tribunate of Camillus, Albinus, Albinus, Medullinus, Flavus and Ambustus (or, less frequently, year 373 Ab urbe condita). The denomination 381 BC for this year has been used since the early medieval period, when the Anno Domini calendar era became the prevalent method in Europe for naming years.

== Events ==
=== By place ===
==== Persian Empire ====
- The Persian generals Tiribazus and Orontes I invade Cyprus, with an army far larger than any King Evagoras I of Cyprus could raise. However, Evagoras manages to cut off this force from being resupplied, and the starving troops rebel. However, the war then turns in the Persians' favour when Evagoras' fleet is destroyed at the Battle of Citium (Larnaca, Cyprus). Evagoras flees to Salamis, where he manages to conclude a peace which allows him to remain nominally king of Salamis, though in reality he is a vassal of the Persian king.

==== Greece ====
- Sparta increases its hold on central Greece by reestablishing the city of Plataea, which Sparta formerly destroyed in 427 BC.

==== Roman Republic ====
- The district of Tusculum is pacified after a revolt against Rome, and then conquered. After an expression of complete submission to Rome, Tusculum becomes the first "municipium cum suffragio", and thenceforth the city continues to hold the rank of a municipium.

== Births ==
- Duke Xiao of Qin, Chinese ruler of the Qin state. (died in 338 BC)

== Deaths ==
- Wu Qi, Chinese military general, Prime Minister of the State of Chu, also a servant of the State of Lu (born in Wei, 440 BC)
- King Dao of Chu, Chinese king of the state of Chu (unknown birth)
