= 386 BC =

386 BC in various calendars
- Gregorian calendar: 386 BC; CCCLXXXVI BC
- Ab urbe condita: 368
- Ancient Egypt era: XXIX dynasty, 13
- Pharaoh: Hakor, 8
- Ancient Greek Olympiad (summer): 98th Olympiad, year 3
- Assyrian calendar: 4365
- Balinese saka calendar: N/A
- Bengali calendar: −979 – −978
- Berber calendar: 565
- Buddhist calendar: 159
- Burmese calendar: −1023
- Byzantine calendar: 5123–5124
- Chinese calendar: 甲午年 (Wood Horse); 2312 or 2105 — to — 乙未年 (Wood Goat); 2313 or 2106
- Coptic calendar: −669 – −668
- Discordian calendar: 781
- Ethiopian calendar: −393 – −392
- Hebrew calendar: 3375–3376
- Hindu calendars
- Vikram Samvat: −329 – −328
- Shaka Samvat: N/A
- Kali Yuga: 2715–2716
- Holocene calendar: 9615
- Iranian calendar: 1007 BP – 1006 BP
- Islamic calendar: 1038 BH – 1037 BH
- Javanese calendar: N/A
- Julian calendar: N/A
- Korean calendar: 1948
- Minguo calendar: 2297 before ROC 民前2297年
- Nanakshahi calendar: −1853
- Thai solar calendar: 157–158
- Tibetan calendar: ཤིང་ཕོ་རྟ་ལོ་ (male Wood-Horse) −259 or −640 or −1412 — to — ཤིང་མོ་ལུག་ལོ་ (female Wood-Sheep) −258 or −639 or −1411

Year 386 BC was a year of the pre-Julian Roman calendar. At the time, it was known as the Year of the Tribunate of Camillus, Cornelius, Fidenas, Cincinnatus, Pulvillus and Poplicola (or, less frequently, year 368 Ab urbe condita). The denomination 386 BC for this year has been used since the early medieval period, when the Anno Domini calendar era became the prevalent method in Europe for naming years.

== Events ==
=== By place ===
==== Persian Empire ====
- Freed from Spartan attacks by the Peace of Antalcidas ("King's Peace") of the previous year, Persia turns to quieting Cyprus and Egypt. Owing to the skill of King Evagoras of Cyprus and of Egypt's Greek mercenary general Chabrias, these wars drag on for the rest of the decade.

==== Sicily ====
- Dionysius I of Syracuse extends the influence and trade of Syracuse to the Adriatic, establishing colonies at Adria, Ancona and Issa.

==== China ====
- The Chinese city of Handan is founded by the State of Zhao.

== Births ==
- Mithridates II of Cius, ruler of Cius in Mysia from 337 to 302 BC

== Deaths ==
- Aristophanes, Greek playwright (b. c. 456 BC)
