= Capitoline Games =

Ancient Roman games

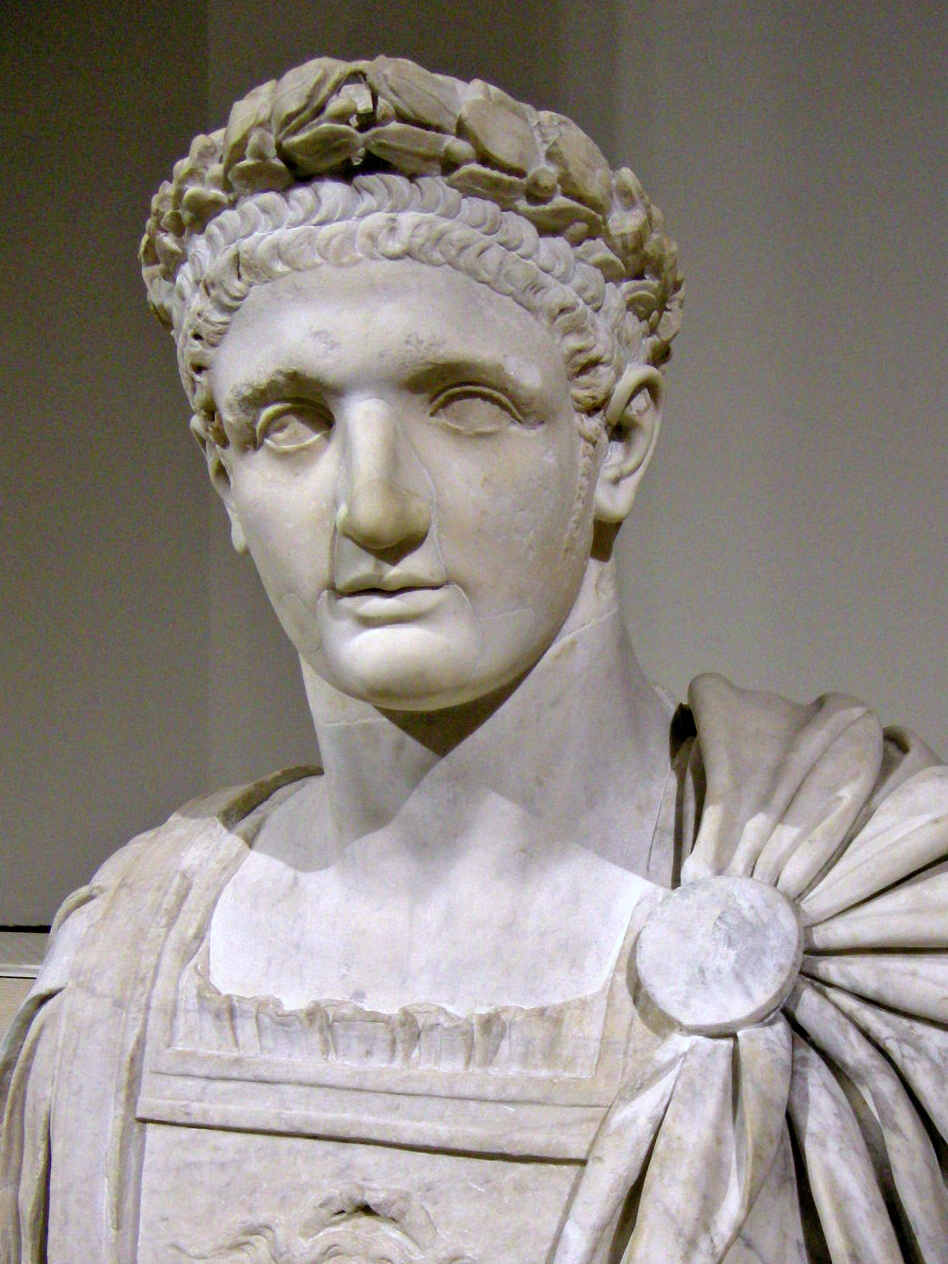
Bust of Emperor Domitian (reigned 81–96)

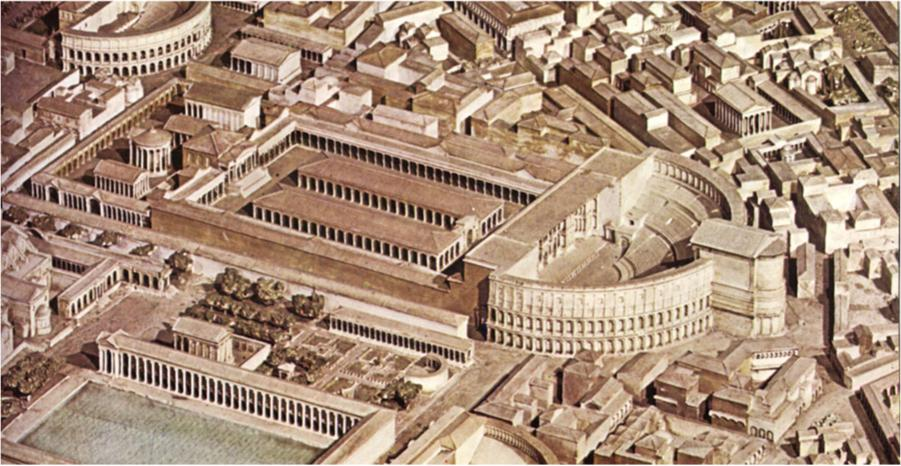
The Campus Martius. This arena held many of the Capitoline Games.

In Ancient Rome, the Capitoline Games (Latin: Ludi Capitolini) were annual games (ludi). They started out as religious holiday celebrations that "called upon divine support to ensure continued prosperity for the state." They were instituted by Camillus, 387 BC, in honor of Jupiter Capitolinus, and in commemoration of the Capitol's not being taken by the Gauls that same year. The games lasted sixteen days, starting on October 15.

According to Plutarch, a part of the ceremony involved the public criers putting up the Etruscans for sale by auction. They also took an old man, tying a golden bulla (amulet) around his neck, such as were worn by children, and submitting him to public derision. Festus said that they dressed him in a praetexta, and hung a bull around his neck, not in the manner of a child, but because this was an ornament of the kings of Etruria.

The original Capitoline Games fell into disuse, but new ones were instituted by Domitian in 86, modeled after the Olympic Games in Greece. Every four years, in the early summer, contestants came from several nations to participate in various events. Rewards and crowns were bestowed on the poets and placed on their heads by the Emperor himself. The feast was not for poets alone, but also for champions, orators, historians, comedians, musicians, etc. These games became so celebrated, that the manner of accounting time by lustres (periods of five years) was changed, and they began to count by Capitoline games, as the Ancient Greeks did by Olympiads.

== Introduction ==
The Capitoline Games were markedly different from other Roman games. For one thing, the Games were specific Greek-styled games instituted by Domitian in 86 AD during a time of remodeling. From then on, these games were held every four years, a tradition held by today's contemporary Olympic Games. He built the first and only permanent building, the Stadium of Domitian in the Campus Martius, to house these Greek games. Previously, Greek games had appeared sporadically since early second century BC but had not been enduring until the first century AD.

The Campus Martius lay just west of the seven hills and outside of the pomerium. which was a hallowed, public space and had its separate grounds away from Rome itself. It had training rooms connected to baths, a concept that beforehand was not conceived due to the pre-existing Roman thought that bathing and physical exercise were separate on the whole (they considered physical training as warfare preparation and therefore had no place near baths). This bath/training room was a uniquely Greek custom.

== History ==
The typical Greek games included events for javelin, long jump, and discus. Other events had wrestling and boxing. Greek styled games had several initial functions. One of them was to celebrate generals’ successes in Greece. Other functions involved power moves exercised by rulers. Roman emperors had considerable decisions over the Campus Martius.

Julius Caesar had temporary stages in the Campus, including ones with an artificial lake designed for mock water fights. The Saepta Julia was a building located in the Campus that was reserved for voting and other such political matters. It was planned by Julius Caesar.

Augustus held his own games at the arena: three sets of his own (two in his name and one for his grandson). Of his games, one was named the Actia (Actian Games) in 28 BC. The Actia had gymnastics shows on a wooden stage. The Augustalia (Augustan Games), were the second in 19 BC. The third Games were held in 12 BC, used to honor his promotion to Pontifex Maximus.

== Rewards and recognition ==
The appreciation that Romans give particularly to the athletes competing in the events was evident in the numerous tokens dedicated to certain athletes. In other occasions, artists such as poets, musicians, and orators were recognized for their skills. Such tokens included lamps decorated with foliage, flowers, and crowns. This was a way to commemorate the games.

== Growing Greek influence ==
The prominence of Greek athletics points towards the prevailing influence Greek culture had on the minds of the Romans. The popularity of the Greek games held in the arenas only attest to the claim. Athletics was in a way a method to preserve and highlight the virility of Greek honor in a physical way, demonstrated through feats of spectacular strengths and finesse, usually naked in order to make a statement about comparing fit Greek bodies to others. This was especially contrastive with Roman morals, which decried public nudity.

The Romans’ adoption of Greek games underlined a certain kind of thought reversal on Rome’s part. Such acceptance became more widely recognized, especially through the influx of Greek immigrants via slavery or other means of displacement. The ever-changing populous of Rome and its varied citizens soon added Greeks into the equations; even the governmental senators were sometimes selected from the Greek-provinces of Rome. In a sense, Rome was a cosmopolitan city, spoken in many languages such as Latin, Greek, and Oscan, this shows a multifaceted empire made up of different parts around the Mediterranean area. Greek arts, luxuries, and ideas were infused into Roman culture, so much so that it was not abnormal to see even Romans enact special sporting events like the ones above. The Romans merely adapted such values to their own lifestyle. In other ways, having Greek-styled games could be a tactic on the part of the Romans enjoying the culture of conquered lands.
