= 323 BC =

323 BC in various calendars
Gregorian calendar	323 BC; CCCXXIII BC
Ab urbe condita	431
Ancient Egypt era	XXXIII dynasty, 1
Pharaoh	Ptolemy I Soter, 1
Ancient Greek Olympiad (summer)	114th Olympiad, year 2
Assyrian calendar	4428
Balinese saka calendar	N/A
Bengali calendar	−916 – −915
Berber calendar	628
Buddhist calendar	222
Burmese calendar	−960
Byzantine calendar	5186–5187
Chinese calendar	丁酉年 (Fire Rooster); 2375 or 2168 — to — 戊戌年 (Earth Dog); 2376 or 2169
Coptic calendar	−606 – −605
Discordian calendar	844
Ethiopian calendar	−330 – −329
Hebrew calendar	3438–3439
- Hindu calendars
Vikram Samvat	−266 – −265
Shaka Samvat	N/A
Kali Yuga	2778–2779
Holocene calendar	9678
Iranian calendar	944 BP – 943 BP
Islamic calendar	973 BH – 972 BH
Javanese calendar	N/A
Julian calendar	N/A
Korean calendar	2011
Minguo calendar	2234 before ROC 民前2234年
Nanakshahi calendar	−1790
Thai solar calendar	220–221
Tibetan calendar	མེ་མོ་བྱ་ལོ་ (female Fire-Bird) −196 or −577 or −1349 — to — ས་ཕོ་ཁྱི་ལོ་ (male Earth-Dog) −195 or −576 or −1348

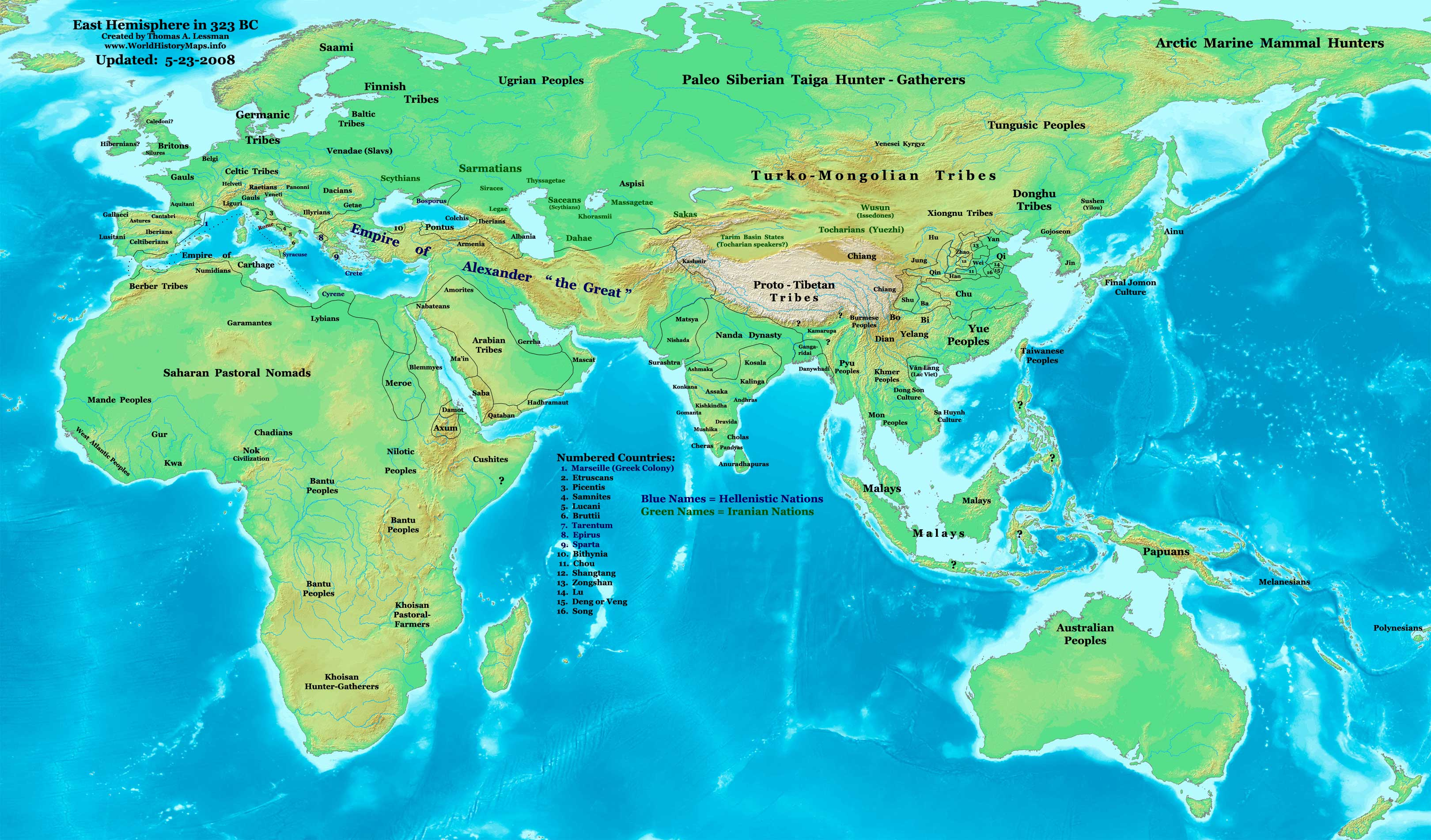
Map of the Eastern Hemisphere in 323 BC.

Year 323 BC was a year of the pre-Julian Roman calendar. At the time, it was known as the Year of the Consulship of Longus and Cerretanus (or, less frequently, year 431 Ab urbe condita). The denomination 323 BC for this year has been used since the early medieval period, when the Anno Domini calendar era became the prevalent method in Europe for naming years.

== Events ==
=== By place ===
==== Macedonian Empire ====
- Alexander orders demolition of the ziggurat at Etemenanki.
- 10 June/11 June – In Babylon, Alexander the Great dies, ten days after being taken ill after a prolonged banquet and drinking bout. Diogenes, the philosopher he met years before, when he was just about to set out on his conquests, allegedly dies on the exact same day.
- The Partition of Babylon sets out the division of the territories conquered by Alexander the Great between his generals. The partition is a result of a compromise, essentially brokered by Eumenes, following a conflict of opinion between the party of Meleager, who wishes to give full power to Philip III (the illegitimate son of King Philip II of Macedon by Philinna of Larissa), and the party of Perdiccas, who wishes to wait for the birth of the heir of Alexander and his wife, Roxana (the future Alexander IV) to give him the throne under the control of a regent.
- Under the agreement, Philip III becomes king, but Perdiccas, as the regent, effectively becomes the ruler of Alexander's empire. Perdiccas manages the partition of the territories between the former generals and saintly with Alexander's chief lieutenant Craterus);
  - Laomedon governing Syria and Phoenicia;
  - Philotas looking after Cilicia;
  - Peithon taking Media;
  - Antigonus gaining the governorship of Pamphylia and Lycia;
  - Leonnatus with Phrygia;
  - Neoptolemus with Armenia;
  - Ptolemy as governor of Egypt;
  - Eumenes of Cardia as governor of Cappadocia and Paphlagonia; and
  - Lysimachus becomes governor of Thrace.
- Perdiccas exercises a wide authority in Asia as "supreme general". Perdiccas largely leaves Alexander's arrangements intact:
  - Taxiles and Porus are to rule over their kingdoms in India;
  - Alexander's father-in-law Oxyartes rules Gandhara;
  - Sibyrtius governs Arachosia and Gedrosia;
  - Stasanor rules in Aria and Drangiana;
  - Philip controls Bactria and Sogdiana;
  - Phrataphernes rules Parthia and Hyrcania;
  - Peucestas governs Persis;
  - Tlepolemus is left in charge of Carmania;
  - Atropates governs northern Media;
  - Archon of Pella controls Babylonia; and
  - Arcesilas rules northern Mesopotamia.
- Meleager and about 300 of his partisans are killed by forces loyal to Perdiccas. The first wife of Alexander, Roxana, arranges for Alexander's second wife, Stateira II (Barsine), to be killed.

==== Greece ====
- Some Greek cities, including Athens, revolt against the Macedonian regent, Antipater, following the news of Alexander's death. Athens' actions are incited by the speeches of the Athenian general Leosthenes and the Athenian orator Hypereides. Joined by cities in central and south Greece, the Athenians defeat Antipater in battle. They force him to take refuge in Lamia, where he is besieged for several months by the Greek allies.
- The Greek philosopher and scientist, Aristotle, faces a strong anti-Macedonian reaction in Athens following the death of Alexander the Great. Aristotle is accused of impiety by the Athenians. However, he escapes to Chalcis in Euboea.
- Theophrastus, who has been studying in Athens under Aristotle, becomes the head of the Lyceum, the academy in Athens founded by Aristotle, when Aristotle is forced to leave Athens.
- Following Alexander the Great's death, the Athenians recall Demosthenes from exile and provide the money to pay his fine.

== Births ==
- Alexander IV of Macedon, son of Alexander the Great and Roxana (d. 309 BC).

== Deaths ==
- June 13 – Alexander the Great, king of Macedonia and conqueror of the Persian Empire died in Babylon (b. 356 BC)
- Diogenes of Sinope, Greek philosopher (b. c. 412 BC)
- Meleager, Macedonian general who has served with Alexander the Great
