= 356 BC =

356 BC in various calendars
Gregorian calendar	356 BC; CCCLVI BC
Ab urbe condita	398
Ancient Egypt era	XXX dynasty, 25
Pharaoh	Nectanebo II, 5
Ancient Greek Olympiad (summer)	106th Olympiad (victor)¹
Assyrian calendar	4395
Balinese saka calendar	N/A
Bengali calendar	−949 – −948
Berber calendar	595
Buddhist calendar	189
Burmese calendar	−993
Byzantine calendar	5153–5154
Chinese calendar	甲子年 (Wood Rat); 2342 or 2135 — to — 乙丑年 (Wood Ox); 2343 or 2136
Coptic calendar	−639 – −638
Discordian calendar	811
Ethiopian calendar	−363 – −362
Hebrew calendar	3405–3406
- Hindu calendars
Vikram Samvat	−299 – −298
Shaka Samvat	N/A
Kali Yuga	2745–2746
Holocene calendar	9645
Iranian calendar	977 BP – 976 BP
Islamic calendar	1007 BH – 1006 BH
Javanese calendar	N/A
Julian calendar	N/A
Korean calendar	1978
Minguo calendar	2267 before ROC 民前2267年
Nanakshahi calendar	−1823
Thai solar calendar	187–188
Tibetan calendar	ཤིང་ཕོ་བྱི་བ་ལོ་ (male Wood-Rat) −229 or −610 or −1382 — to — ཤིང་མོ་གླང་ལོ་ (female Wood-Ox) −228 or −609 or −1381

Year 356 BC was a year of the pre-Julian Roman calendar. At the time, it was known as the Year of the Consulship of Ambustus and Laenas (or, less frequently, year 398 Ab urbe condita). The denomination 356 BC for this year has been used since the early medieval period, when the Anno Domini calendar era became the prevalent method in Europe for naming years.

== Events ==
=== By place ===
==== Persian Empire ====
- Having blamed their defeats to Philip II in Thessaly and Chalcidice on his colleagues (Iphicrates and Timotheus), Chares is left in sole command of the Athenian fleet. Chares, in need of money for his war effort, frowns upon asking it from Athens, so, partly compelled by his mercenaries, he enters the service of the insurgent Achaemenid satrap of Phrygia Artabazus who rewards Chares very generously.
- Artabazus is also supported by the Thebans, who send him 5,000 men under one of their generals Pammenes. With the assistance of these and other allies, Artabazus defeats his Achaemenid enemies in two great battles.
- The Achaemenid King Artaxerxes III orders all the satraps (governors) of his empire to dismiss their mercenaries. The Athenians, who have originally approved their mercenaries' collaboration with Artabazus of Phrygia, order them to leave due to their fear of Achaemenid support for the rebellion of Chios, Rhodes, and Cos. Thebes follows suit and withdraws its mercenaries.
- With King Artaxerxes III succeeding in depriving Artabazus of his Athenian and Theban allies, Artabazus is defeated by the Persian King's general, Autophradates.

==== Greece ====
- Philip II of Macedon secretly offers the city of Amphipolis back to the Athenians in exchange for the valuable port of Pydna. Despite the Athenians being willing to comply, both Pydna and Potidaea are conquered by the Macedonians (along with other Athenian strongholds in Thessaly and Chalcidice) despite being defended by Athenian forces led by general and mercenary commander, Chares, as well as generals Iphicrates and Timotheus.
- With Pydna and Potidaea occupied, Philip II decides to keep Amphipolis anyway. He also takes the city of Crenides from the Odrysae and renames it Philippi.
- The Phocians capture and sack Delphi in whose territory the famous temple and oracle stand. A sacred war is declared against them by the other members of the Great Amphictyonic League. The Phocians, led by two capable generals, Philomelus and Onomarchus, use Delphi's riches to hire a mercenary army to carry the war into Boeotia and Thessaly.
- The Social War begins between the Second Athenian League, led by Athens, and its revolting allies of Chios, Rhodes, and Kos as well as the independent state Byzantium. Mausolus, the tyrant of Caria, instigates the rebellion against the Athenian control of these states. The revolting allies ravage the islands of Lemnos and Imbros which are loyal to Athens.
- The Athenian generals Chares and Chabrias are given command of the Athenian fleet with the aim of defeating the rebellious cities. However, Chabrias' fleet is defeated and he is killed in its attack on the island of Chios, off the coast of Ionia.
- Chares is given sole command of the Athenian fleet and withdraws to the Hellespont to move against Byzantium. The generals Timotheus, Iphicrates and his son Menestheus are sent with 60 ships to help him when the enemy fleet is sighted on the Hellespont. Timotheus and Iphicrates refuse to engage due to a severe gale, but Chares does engage and lose many of his ships. Timotheus and Iphicrates are accused by Chares and put on trial, however only Timotheus is condemned to pay a fine.

==== Roman Republic ====
- Gaius Marcius Rutilus is the first plebeian to be chosen as a dictator in Rome.

==== China ====
- With his reforms initiated in this year, the Chinese prime minister Shang Yang starts to transform the once marginal and frontier State of Qin to become the most dominant military force amongst the Warring States of China by the 3rd century BC.

=== By topic ===
==== Architecture ====
- July 21 (traditional date) – The Temple of Artemis at Ephesus is burned down by a madman named Herostratus, destroying one of the Seven Wonders of the World. The great temple was built by Croesus, king of Lydia, in about 550 BC and was famous not only for its great size (110 metres by 55 metres), but also for the magnificent works of art that adorned it.

== Births ==
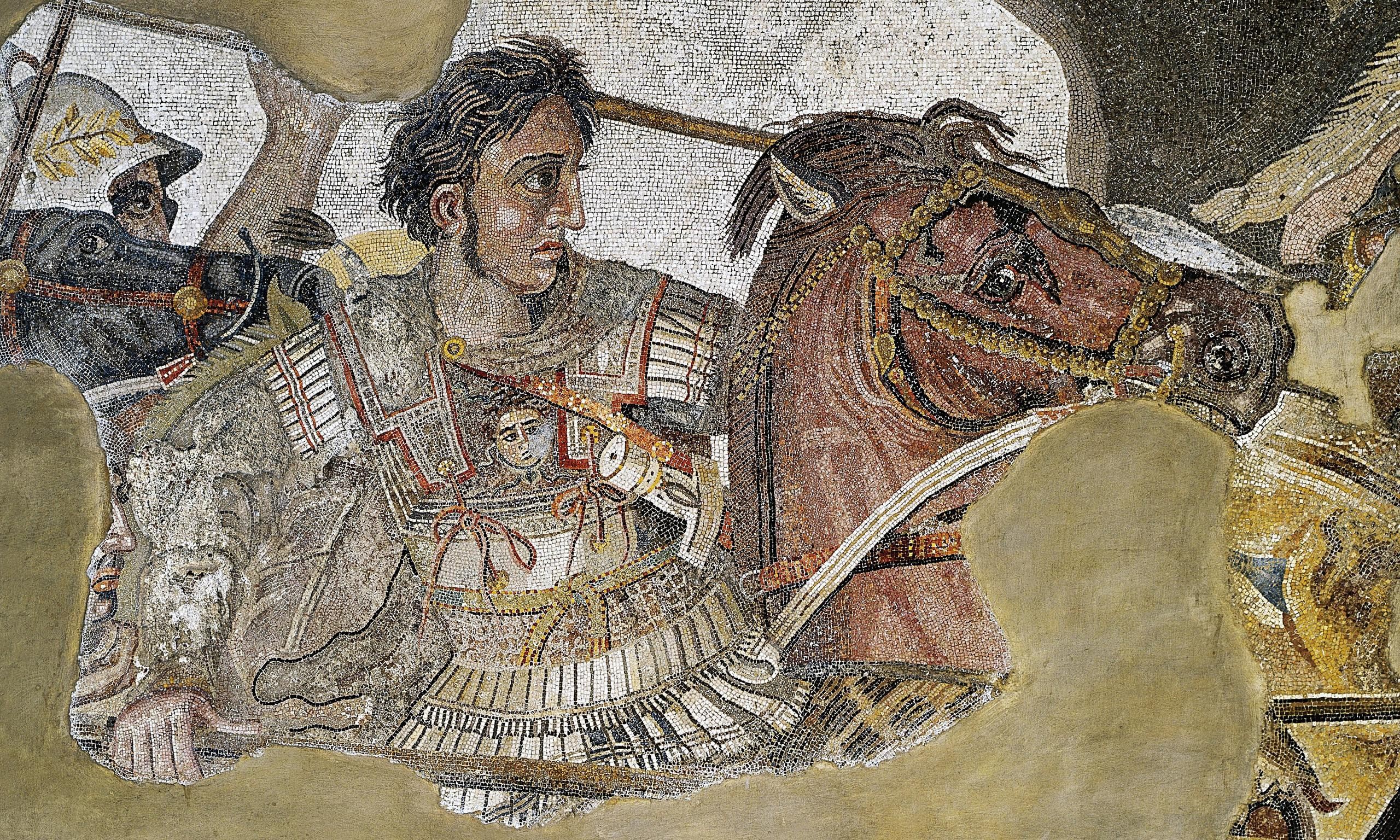
King Alexander the Great

- July 20/21 – Alexander the Great, King of Macedonia (d. 323 BC).
- Hephaestion, Macedonian general, soldier, aristocrat, and companion of Alexander the Great (d. 324 BC).

== Deaths ==
- Chabrias, Athenian general died at Chios
- Herostratus.
- Philistus.
