= 344 BC =

344 BC in various calendars
- Gregorian calendar: 344 BC; CCCXLIV BC
- Ab urbe condita: 410
- Ancient Egypt era: XXX dynasty, 37
- Pharaoh: Nectanebo II, 17
- Ancient Greek Olympiad (summer): 109th Olympiad (victor)¹
- Assyrian calendar: 4407
- Balinese saka calendar: N/A
- Bengali calendar: −937 – −936
- Berber calendar: 607
- Buddhist calendar: 201
- Burmese calendar: −981
- Byzantine calendar: 5165–5166
- Chinese calendar: 丙子年 (Fire Rat); 2354 or 2147 — to — 丁丑年 (Fire Ox); 2355 or 2148
- Coptic calendar: −627 – −626
- Discordian calendar: 823
- Ethiopian calendar: −351 – −350
- Hebrew calendar: 3417–3418
- Hindu calendars
- Vikram Samvat: −287 – −286
- Shaka Samvat: N/A
- Kali Yuga: 2757–2758
- Holocene calendar: 9657
- Iranian calendar: 965 BP – 964 BP
- Islamic calendar: 995 BH – 994 BH
- Javanese calendar: N/A
- Julian calendar: N/A
- Korean calendar: 1990
- Minguo calendar: 2255 before ROC 民前2255年
- Nanakshahi calendar: −1811
- Thai solar calendar: 199–200
- Tibetan calendar: མེ་ཕོ་བྱི་བ་ལོ་ (male Fire-Rat) −217 or −598 or −1370 — to — མེ་མོ་གླང་ལོ་ (female Fire-Ox) −216 or −597 or −1369

Year 344 BC was a year of the pre-Julian Roman calendar. At the time it was known as the Year of the Consulship of Rutilus and Torquatus (or, less frequently, year 410 Ab urbe condita). The denomination 344 BC for this year has been used since the early medieval period, when the Anno Domini calendar era became the prevalent method in Europe for naming years.

== Events ==
=== By place ===
==== Persian Empire ====
- The king of Caria, Idrieus, dies, leaving the Persian satrapy, by his will, to his sister Ada, to whom he was married.

==== Greece ====
- Philip II of Macedon besieges Perinthus, which had defied him and was inclining towards his opponents the Athenians, the Perinthian's allies Byzantium and the Achaemenid Empire support Perinthus in their defence of the city.
- Philip divides his army, leaving one part to besiege Perinthus and taking the other to besiege Byzantium.
- The Athenian statesman, Demosthenes, travels to Peloponnesus, in order to detach as many cities as possible from Macedon's influence, but his efforts are generally unsuccessful. Most of the Peloponnesians see Philip II as the guarantor of their freedom, so they send a joint embassy to Athens to express their grievances against Demosthenes' activities. In response to these complaints, Demosthenes delivers the Second Philippic, which is a vehement attack against Philip II.

==== Sicily ====
- The aristocracy of Syracuse appeal to their mother city of Corinth against their tyrant Dionysius II. The Corinthian general Timoleon is chosen to lead a liberation force to Sicily. Landing at Tauromenium (Taormina) on March 21st, Timoleon faces two armies, one under Dionysius and the other under Hicetas (tyrant of nearby Leontini), who has also called in Carthaginian forces. By shrewd tactics Timoleon defeats his enemies and occupies Syracuse.
- Dionysius II goes into exile once more after the successful invasion by Timoleon of Corinth.

=== By topic ===
==== Science ====
- The Greek philosopher and scientist, Aristotle, travels from Assus to Lesbos to study natural history, especially marine biology.

== Deaths ==
- Idrieus, king of Caria
