= 326 BC =

326 BC in various calendars
Gregorian calendar	326 BC; CCCXXVI BC
Ab urbe condita	428
Ancient Egypt era	XXXII dynasty, 7
Pharaoh	Alexander the Great, 7
Ancient Greek Olympiad (summer)	113th Olympiad, year 3
Assyrian calendar	4425
Balinese saka calendar	N/A
Bengali calendar	−919 – −918
Berber calendar	625
Buddhist calendar	219
Burmese calendar	−963
Byzantine calendar	5183–5184
Chinese calendar	甲午年 (Wood Horse); 2372 or 2165 — to — 乙未年 (Wood Goat); 2373 or 2166
Coptic calendar	−609 – −608
Discordian calendar	841
Ethiopian calendar	−333 – −332
Hebrew calendar	3435–3436
- Hindu calendars
Vikram Samvat	−269 – −268
Shaka Samvat	N/A
Kali Yuga	2775–2776
Holocene calendar	9675
Iranian calendar	947 BP – 946 BP
Islamic calendar	976 BH – 975 BH
Javanese calendar	N/A
Julian calendar	N/A
Korean calendar	2008
Minguo calendar	2237 before ROC 民前2237年
Nanakshahi calendar	−1793
Thai solar calendar	217–218
Tibetan calendar	阳木马年 (male Wood-Horse) −199 or −580 or −1352 — to — 阴木羊年 (female Wood-Goat) −198 or −579 or −1351

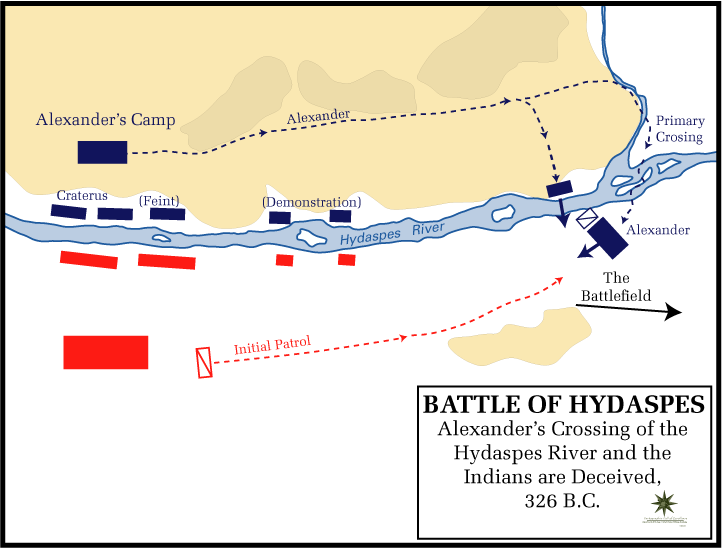
The Battle of Hydaspes

Year 326 BC was a year of the pre-Julian Roman calendar. At the time, it was known as the Year of the Consulship of Visolus and Cursor (or, less frequently, year 428 Ab urbe condita). The denomination 326 BC for this year has been used since the early medieval period, when the Anno Domini calendar era became the prevalent method in Europe for naming years.

== Events ==
=== By place ===
==== Macedonian Empire ====
- Spring – Alexander the Great crosses the Indus near Attock and enters ancient Taxila, whose ruler, Taxiles (or Ambhi), furnishes 130 war elephants and troops in return for aid against his rival Porus, who rules the lands between the Hydaspes (modern Jhelum River) and the Acesines (modern Chenab River).
- On the left bank of the Hydaspes, Alexander fights his last great battle, the Battle of the Hydaspes River. He and his general Craterus defeat the Indian King Porus. Alexander founds two cities there, Alexandria on the Indus or Alexandria Nicaea (to celebrate his victory) and Alexandria Bucephalous or Bucephala (named after his horse Bucephalus, which dies there); and Porus becomes his friend and ally.
- Philip, an officer in the service of Alexander the Great, is appointed satrap of India, including the provinces to the west of the Hydaspes, as far south as the junction of the Indus with the Acesines. Philip is put in charge by Alexander of building the city of Alexandria on the Indus.
- Alexander continues on to conquer all the headwaters of the Indus River. East of Porus' kingdom, near the Ganges River, Alexander faces the powerful empire of Magadha ruled by the Nanda dynasty. Fearing the prospects of facing another powerful Indian army and exhausted by years of campaigning, his army mutinies at the Hyphasis River (the modern Beas River) and refuses to march further east, thus making this river mark the easternmost extent of Alexander's conquests.
- Following the mutiny of his army at the Hyphasis River, Alexander is persuaded by his army leaders to abandon his plans for invading the Ganges Valley. Alexander appoints Nearchus, a Cretan with naval experience, as admiral and places under his command all in the ranks of his army with any knowledge of seafaring. Nearchus has Indian shipwrights build 800 vessels, some as large as 300 tons, to take the army through Persian Gulf waters to Babylon. Alexander the Great begins the return march down the Indus to the sea.
- After the departure of Alexander from India, Philip is assassinated by some of the mercenary troops under his command. Alexander names Eudamus and Taxilas as replacement rulers of Philip's territories.

==== Roman Republic ====
- Following their defeat by the Roman forces in Naples, the Samnites declare war on Rome starting the Second Samnite War. To help defeat the Samnites, the Romans make alliances with the peoples of Central Italy to the north of Samnium and with the Apulians to the southeast.

== Births ==
- Pharnavaz I of Iberia, later King of Iberia

== Deaths ==
- Coenus, son of Polemocrates and son-in-law of Parmenion and one of Alexander the Great's generals in his Persian and Indian expeditions
