= 383 BC =

383 BC in various calendars
- Gregorian calendar: 383 BC; CCCLXXXIII BC
- Ab urbe condita: 371
- Ancient Egypt era: XXIX dynasty, 16
- Pharaoh: Hakor, 11
- Ancient Greek Olympiad (summer): 99th Olympiad, year 2
- Assyrian calendar: 4368
- Balinese saka calendar: N/A
- Bengali calendar: −976 – −975
- Berber calendar: 568
- Buddhist calendar: 162
- Burmese calendar: −1020
- Byzantine calendar: 5126–5127
- Chinese calendar: 丁酉年 (Fire Rooster); 2315 or 2108 — to — 戊戌年 (Earth Dog); 2316 or 2109
- Coptic calendar: −666 – −665
- Discordian calendar: 784
- Ethiopian calendar: −390 – −389
- Hebrew calendar: 3378–3379
- Hindu calendars
- Vikram Samvat: −326 – −325
- Shaka Samvat: N/A
- Kali Yuga: 2718–2719
- Holocene calendar: 9618
- Iranian calendar: 1004 BP – 1003 BP
- Islamic calendar: 1035 BH – 1034 BH
- Javanese calendar: N/A
- Julian calendar: N/A
- Korean calendar: 1951
- Minguo calendar: 2294 before ROC 民前2294年
- Nanakshahi calendar: −1850
- Thai solar calendar: 160–161
- Tibetan calendar: མེ་མོ་བྱ་ལོ་ (female Fire-Bird) −256 or −637 or −1409 — to — ས་ཕོ་ཁྱི་ལོ་ (male Earth-Dog) −255 or −636 or −1408

Year 383 BC was of the pre-Julian Roman calendar. At the time, it was known as the Year of the Tribunate of Poplicola, Capitolinus, Rufus, Flavus, Mamercinus and Trebonius (or, less frequently, year 371 Ab urbe condita). The denomination 383 BC for this year has been used since the early medieval period, when the Anno Domini calendar era became the prevalent method in Europe for naming years.

== Events ==
=== By place ===
==== Greece ====
- King Amyntas III of Macedon, forms a temporary alliance with the Chalcidian League, a confederation of cities of the Chalcidice peninsula, east of Macedonia. Sparta, whose policy is to keep Greeks disunited, sends an expedition northwards to disrupt the Chalcidian League.

=== By topic ===
==== Astronomy ====
- The 19 year lunar cycle is introduced into the Babylonian calendar.

==== Religion ====
- The second Buddhist council is convened by king Kalasoka and held at Vaisali.
