= 456 BC =

456 BC in various calendars
| Gregorian calendar | 456 BC; CDLVI BC |
| Ab urbe condita | 298 |
| Ancient Egypt era | XXVII dynasty, 70 |
| Pharaoh | Artaxerxes I of Persia, 10 |
| Ancient Greek Olympiad (summer) | 81st Olympiad (victor)¹ |
| Assyrian calendar | 4295 |
| Balinese saka calendar | N/A |
| Bengali calendar | −1049 – −1048 |
| Berber calendar | 495 |
| Buddhist calendar | 89 |
| Burmese calendar | −1093 |
| Byzantine calendar | 5053–5054 |
| Chinese calendar | 甲申年 (Wood Monkey); 2242 or 2035 — to — 乙酉年 (Wood Rooster); 2243 or 2036 |
| Coptic calendar | −739 – −738 |
| Discordian calendar | 711 |
| Ethiopian calendar | −463 – −462 |
| Hebrew calendar | 3305–3306 |
- Hindu calendars
| Vikram Samvat | −399 – −398 |
| Shaka Samvat | N/A |
| Kali Yuga | 2645–2646 |
| Holocene calendar | 9545 |
| Iranian calendar | 1077 BP – 1076 BP |
| Islamic calendar | 1110 BH – 1109 BH |
| Javanese calendar | N/A |
| Julian calendar | N/A |
| Korean calendar | 1878 |
| Minguo calendar | 2367 before ROC 民前2367年 |
| Nanakshahi calendar | −1923 |
| Thai solar calendar | 87–88 |
| Tibetan calendar | 阳木猴年 (male Wood-Monkey) −329 or −710 or −1482 — to — 阴木鸡年 (female Wood-Rooster) −328 or −709 or −1481 |

Year 456 BC was a year of the pre-Julian Roman calendar. At the time, it was known as the Year of the Consulship of Lactuca and Caeliomontanus (or, less frequently, year 298 Ab urbe condita). The denomination 456 BC for this year has been used since the early medieval period, when the Anno Domini calendar era became the prevalent method in Europe for naming years.

== Events ==
=== By place ===
==== Greece ====
- The first of the Athenian sculptor Phidias' monuments to Athena, the bronze Athena Promachos, is placed on the Athenian Acropolis, measuring about 9 metres high.
- The temple of Zeus in Olympia is finished.

== Births ==
- Aristophanes, Greek playwright (d. c. 386 BC)

== Deaths ==
- Aeschylus, Greek playwright (b. 525 BC)
