= 388 BC =

388 BC in various calendars
- Gregorian calendar: 388 BC; CCCLXXXVIII BC
- Ab urbe condita: 366
- Ancient Egypt era: XXIX dynasty, 11
- Pharaoh: Hakor, 6
- Ancient Greek Olympiad (summer): 98th Olympiad (victor)¹
- Assyrian calendar: 4363
- Balinese saka calendar: N/A
- Bengali calendar: −981 – −980
- Berber calendar: 563
- Buddhist calendar: 157
- Burmese calendar: −1025
- Byzantine calendar: 5121–5122
- Chinese calendar: 壬辰年 (Water Dragon); 2310 or 2103 — to — 癸巳年 (Water Snake); 2311 or 2104
- Coptic calendar: −671 – −670
- Discordian calendar: 779
- Ethiopian calendar: −395 – −394
- Hebrew calendar: 3373–3374
- Hindu calendars
- Vikram Samvat: −331 – −330
- Shaka Samvat: N/A
- Kali Yuga: 2713–2714
- Holocene calendar: 9613
- Iranian calendar: 1009 BP – 1008 BP
- Islamic calendar: 1040 BH – 1039 BH
- Javanese calendar: N/A
- Julian calendar: N/A
- Korean calendar: 1946
- Minguo calendar: 2299 before ROC 民前2299年
- Nanakshahi calendar: −1855
- Thai solar calendar: 155–156
- Tibetan calendar: ཆུ་ཕོ་འབྲུག་ལོ་ (male Water-Dragon) −261 or −642 or −1414 — to — ཆུ་མོ་སྦྲུལ་ལོ་ (female Water-Snake) −260 or −641 or −1413

Year 388 BC was a year of the pre-Julian Roman calendar. At the time, it was known as the Year of the Tribunate of Capitolinus, Fidenas, Iullus, Corvus, Flavus and Rufus (or, less frequently, year 366 Ab urbe condita). The denomination 388 BC for this year has been used since the early medieval period, when the Anno Domini calendar era became the prevalent method in Europe for naming years.

== Events ==
=== By place ===
==== Greece ====
- King Agesipolis I leads a Spartan army against Argos. Since no Argive army challenges him, he plunders the countryside for a time, and then, after receiving several unfavorable omens, returns to Sparta.
- The Athenian general, Thrasybulus, sails to Lesbos, where, with the support of the Mytileneans, he defeats the Spartan forces on the island and wins over a number of cities. While still on Lesbos, however, Thrasybulus is killed by raiders from the city of Aspendus where his financial exactions have made him unpopular.
- Concerned about the revival of Athenian imperialist ambitions, the Persian King Artaxerxes II and King Agesilaus II of Sparta enter into an alliance. Sparta also seeks and gains the support of Dionysius I of Syracuse.
- Athens defeats Sparta

=== By topic ===
==== Art ====
- Plato, having left Athens on Socrates' death to visit Megara and possibly Egypt, travels to Syracuse at the invitation of Dionysius I's brother-in-law Dion.
- Aristophanes' play Plutus is performed.

== Deaths ==
- Thrasybulus, Athenian general who helped overthrow the Thirty Tyrants
- Aristophanes, Greek playwright (approximate year)
