= Treaties between Rome and Carthage =

Four treaties, signed between 509 and 279 BCE

The treaties between Rome and Carthage are the four treaties between the two states that were signed between 509 BC and 279 BC. The treaties influenced the course of history in the Mediterranean and are important for understanding the relationship between the two most important cities of the region during that era. They reveal changes in how Rome perceived itself and how Carthage perceived Rome, and the differences between the perception of the cities and their actual characteristics.

As city-states that became empires, Rome and Carthage eventually found it necessary to formalize their reciprocal interests and zones of influence. For centuries, the two operated side by side, even as allies. Their economic interests and methods of expansion were different. Rome did not look to the sea but engaged first in defending itself against the neighbouring Samnites, Etruscans, Gauls, and Greeks and then in conquering them. Carthage, lacking a real civic army and repelled in Sicily by the Greeks, appeared indecisive regarding its expansion strategy: the aristocratic party was inclined to extend the power of the city into surrounding lands, but the commercial party was more interested in exploiting trade routes and markets.

By stipulating and observing four main treaties, the relationship between Rome and Carthage was one of tolerance for centuries. Carthage and Rome also concluded two treaties to end the First and the Second Punic Wars in 241 BC and 201 BC, when the relationship between the powers had changed considerably.

== Background ==
=== Carthage ===
Carthage was founded in 814 BC by Phoenician colonists from Tyre, and by the 6th century BC, the sailors and merchants of Carthage were known throughout the western Mediterranean. In the 4th century BC, after a series of military conquests, Carthage controlled many territories west of the gulf of Sirte, in present-day Libya, and much of the coasts of Numidia and Iberia. The coasts of Sardinia and Corsica were already under Carthaginian control when the city-state attempted, in three wars between 480 and 307 BC to conquer Sicily. Those attempts were stopped by the Greeks, who had by then heavily colonized the island. Primarily interested in commerce, Carthage had no standing army and used mostly mercenary forces composed of Numidian cavalry, Libyans and Iberians.

=== Rome ===
Rome was founded only 70 years after Carthage (in 753 BC, following Varronian chronology). For the first several centuries of its history, Rome was involved in a lengthy series of wars with its neighbours, which resulted in the Roman Army's specialization in land warfare. The Roman economy and social structure began to incorporate the results of those wars by taking loot or tribute, redistributing conquered land and in all cases requiring the subjugated peoples to supply troops in support of Rome (becoming socii, or allies). With respect to maritime commerce, the Romans simply entrusted themselves to the Etruscan and Greek fleets.

=== Commercial control ===
In the 4th century BC, a great line divided the commerce of the Mediterranean. The Aegean, Adriatic and Ionian Seas were largely controlled by the maritime cities of the Greeks (in Greece; Asia Minor; and, after Alexander the Great, Egypt). The western Mediterranean was the commercial zone of the Carthaginians, with the exception of the Tyrrhenian Sea, which Carthage shared with the Etruscans and the Greek colonies of southern Italy.

== First treaty, 509 BC ==
=== Date ===
The first treaty between the two city-states was signed the year the Roman Republic was founded, in 509 BC, as dated by the Varronian method. The calculations of Polybius, a Greek historian whose calculations are based on the years of the Persian expedition against the Greek free cities, produced a slightly different date; he wrote that the events of the treaty took place "twenty-eight years before the passage of Xerxes into Greece". Xerxes, the king of Persia, crossed the Hellespont with his armies in June 480 BC.

=== Background ===
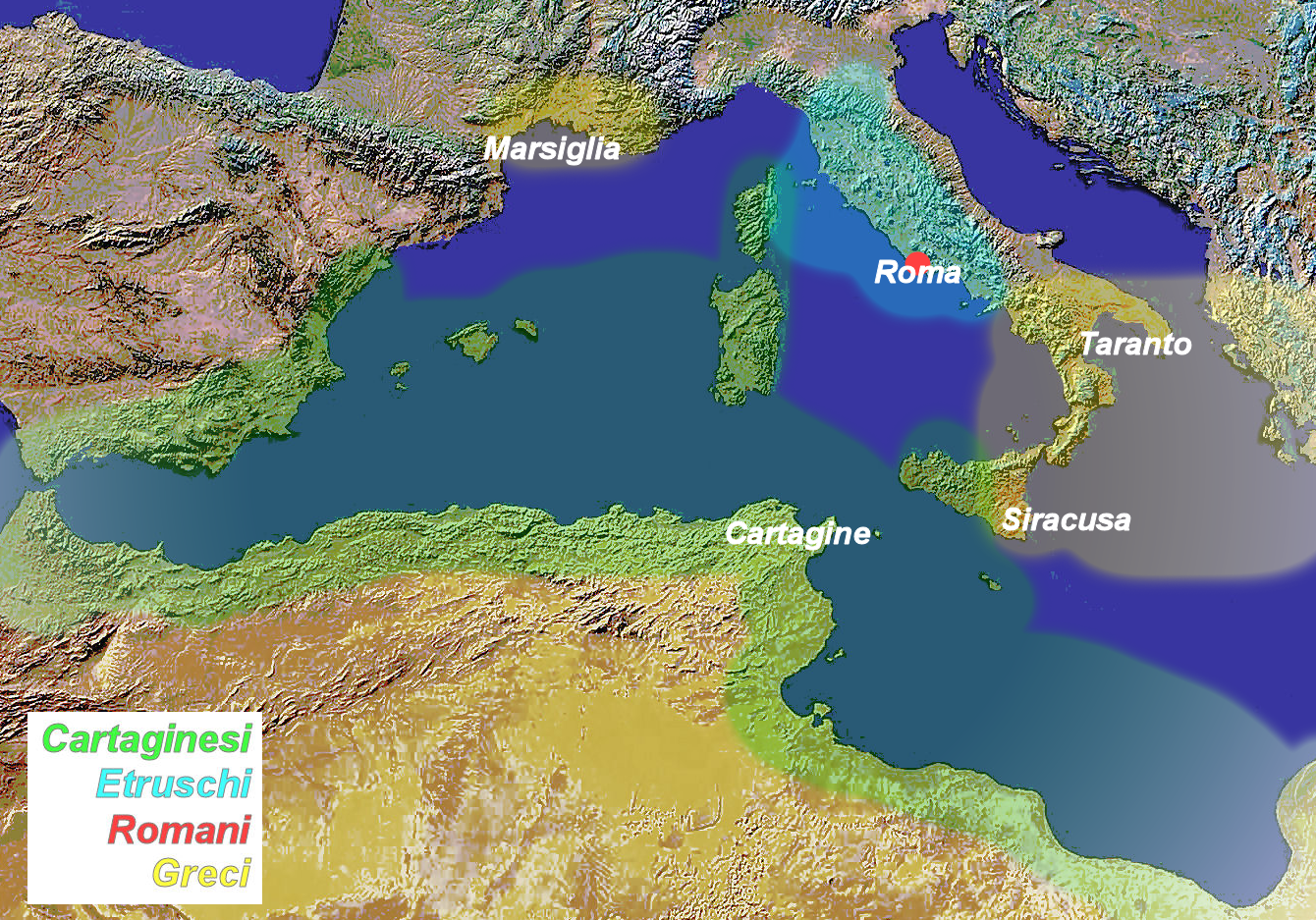
Main areas of influence in west Mediterranean in 509 BC

During the war with Ardea, following the overthrow of Tarquin the Proud, Rome found that it needed to secure itself and its supplies, which were controlled mostly by Greek and Etruscan merchants since the Etruscan Caere and its port of Pyrgi supplied Rome. Rome therefore tried to gain the support of the Carthaginians, who were now already operating in Caere, as evidenced by votive writings found in Etruscan and Phoenician.

At the same time, Carthage was engaged in fighting the Greek colonies that had spread from Greece across the western Mediterranean. The presence of Greek cities along the coasts of southern Italy and the eastern part of Sicily limited Phoenician commerce to the region's interior. In Spain and Provence, Carthage fought to compete with Phocaean colonies, and in Sardinia and Corsica, Carthage was joined by the Etruscans in competition with the Phocaeans. That resulted, subsequently, in the Phocaeans being driven out, Corsica and the Tyrrhenian Sea becoming Etruscan and Sardinia and the western half of Sicily becoming Carthaginian (eastern Sicily would remain Greek for centuries). Additionally, in 510 BC, Carthage had to fight to hold off Spartan incursions into western Sicily.

=== Terms of the treaty ===
The treaty stated that there "shall be friendship between the Romans and their allies, and the Carthaginians and their allies" on the conditions listed below.

==== Conditions on Rome and her allies ====
The conditions imposed by the treaty on Rome and her allies were that

1. They were not to sail past Cape Bello (i.e. into the gulf of Carthage), unless driven there by storm or enemies;
2. If anyone was "driven ashore" he was only to buy or take what was needed for "the repair of his ship and the service of the gods", and had to leave within five days; and
3. Merchants could operate in Sardinia and Libya only in the presence of a herald or town-clerk, and the sale would be secured by the state.

==== Conditions on Carthage and her allies ====
The conditions imposed by the treaty on Carthage and her allies were that

1. They were not to attack certain settlements named in the treaty, that were "subject to the Romans";
2. They were not to attack even townships not subject to Rome, and if they conquered one they were to "deliver it unharmed to the Romans";
3. They were not to build fortresses in Latium;
4. They could not stay the night in Latium if they entered the district armed;
5. In Carthaginian Sicily, Romans were to have the same rights as Carthaginians.

=== Implications ===
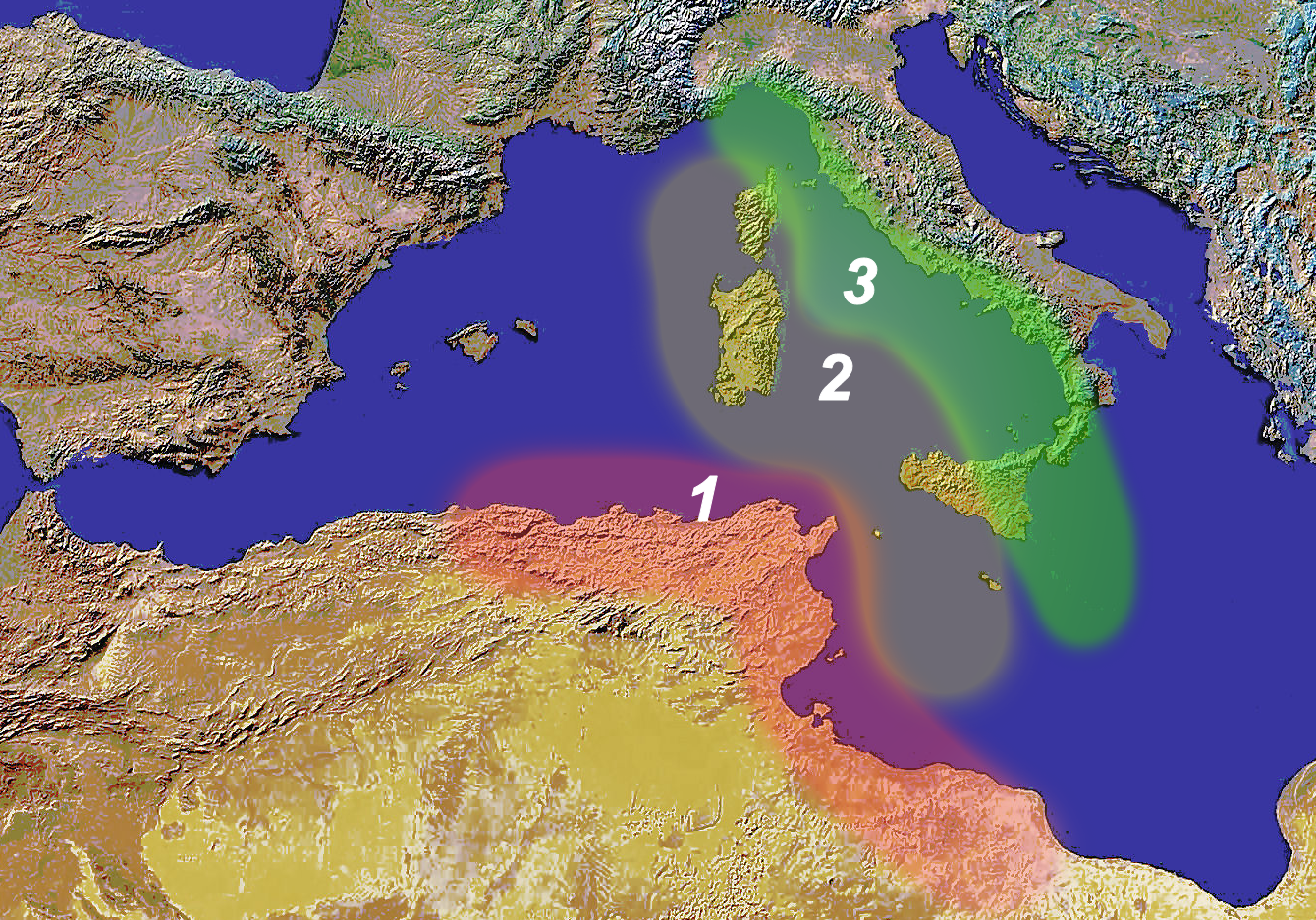
Division of the area: 1: Area prohibited to Rome 2: Area tolerated in emergencies 3: Open waters

Per the treaty, Carthage did not renounce any military action except against a small territory, Latium, and maintained a free hand for action against the Greeks and Etruscans, both of whom were militarily and economically more powerful and dangerous than Rome.

In the graphic at right, the following areas are highlighted and labelled:

1. The area was forbidden to Rome by the treaty. By then, Carthage with its navy had already blocked any competition beyond the channel of Sicily or along the African coast.
2. The area not under direct Carthaginian control. In fact, Greek and Etruscan mariners sailed there freely; Carthage reserved the right to refuse competition but "magnanimously" offered the Romans shelter in case of emergencies or bad weather.
3. The area under Greek and Etruscan control.

Roman expansion before the fall of Tarquin the Proud was directed towards the Tyrrhenian coast to the southwest, and the Roman Republic was proclaimed while Tarquin's army was fighting Ardea. It can be supposed that Rome, with its small size, wanted to formalise the exclusion of competition from Carthage while it began pressuring the Greeks. Otherwise, the contrast of that diplomacy with the war against Ardea would not be so pronounced, and it would not make sense to specifically exclude Carthaginian fortresses.

== Second treaty, 348 BC ==
=== Background ===
After 150 years of campaigning, Rome had conquered a good portion of Etruria, destroyed Veii and repelled the Gallic invasion of 390 BC although it felt threatened by the second Gallic invasion of 360 BC. Rome had been and still was shaken by internal strife, especially between the patricians and the plebeians for access to public office and therefore to political activity and the management of land and spoils of the incessant wars. Rome was also fighting the Ernici, the Volsci, the Tiburtini and the Etruscans and was preparing for battle with the Samnites, who were beginning to raid rich Campania, which Rome also desired.

In Sicily and in southern Italy, where Dionysius the Great had created the beginnings of a unified state, Dionysius the Younger, his son, tried to enlarge his inheritance, but met with resistance from other Greek forces. A flurry of alliances, including some with the Carthaginians, led to the disintegration of Dionysius' power and his deposition in 345 BC. Taranto, which had been left out of the fighting, grew in power, and other forces arrived from Greece. Rome was beginning to assert its influence in these struggles.

Carthage, after ending its war with Cyrenaica, thus stabilizing the eastern boundary of their territory, had been always at war with the Greeks, in particular with Syracuse, for control of Sicily. It was also in conflict with the Etruscans, who, blocked by the Gauls from northern Italy and by the Romans from Latium, applied themselves aggressively to the Tyrrhenian Sea to control traffic there.

=== Terms of the treaty ===
The second treaty was an attempt to copy the first treaty, with the addition of some cities. The Carthaginians added Tyre and Utica and promised not to attack the coastal cities of Latium that had allied themselves with Rome. Similar to the first treaty, the new treaty stated that there "shall be friendship between the Romans and their allies, and the Carthaginians, Tyrians, and [the] township of Utica" on the conditions listed, and that Romans were allowed to trade and do business in the Carthaginian province of Sicily and in Carthage, and Carthaginians were allowed to trade and do business in Rome.

==== Conditions on Rome and her allies ====
1. The Romans were not to maraud, traffic or found a city east of "the Fair Promontory, Mastia, Tarseium."
2. If the Romans took prisoners, "between whom and Carthage a peace has been made in writing, though they be not subject to them", the Romans were not to bring them to any Carthaginian harbor. Additionally, if such a prisoner were brought ashore, and any Carthaginian lay claim to him, he was to be released.
3. If a Roman took water or provisions from any district within the jurisdiction of Carthage, he was not to injure, while so doing, any between whom and Carthage there was peace and friendship. Violation of this rule was to be a public misdemeanor.
4. A Roman was not to traffic or found a city in Sardinia and Libya, and could only take provisions and refit his ship. If a storm had driven him to one of those coasts, he was to depart within five days.

==== Conditions on Carthage, Tyre and Utica ====
1. If the Carthaginians conquered any city in Latium that was not subject to Rome, they may keep the prisoners and the goods but were to deliver the town to Rome.
2. If the Carthaginians took prisoners, "between whom and Rome a peace has been made in writing, though they be not subject to them", the Carthaginians were not to bring them to any Roman harbor. Additionally, if such a prisoner were brought ashore, and any Roman lay claim to him, he was to be released. In like manner shall the Romans be bound towards the Carthaginians.
3. If a Carthaginian took water or provisions from any district within the jurisdiction of Rome, he was not to injure, while so doing, any between whom and Rome there was peace and friendship. Violation of this rule was to be a public misdemeanor.

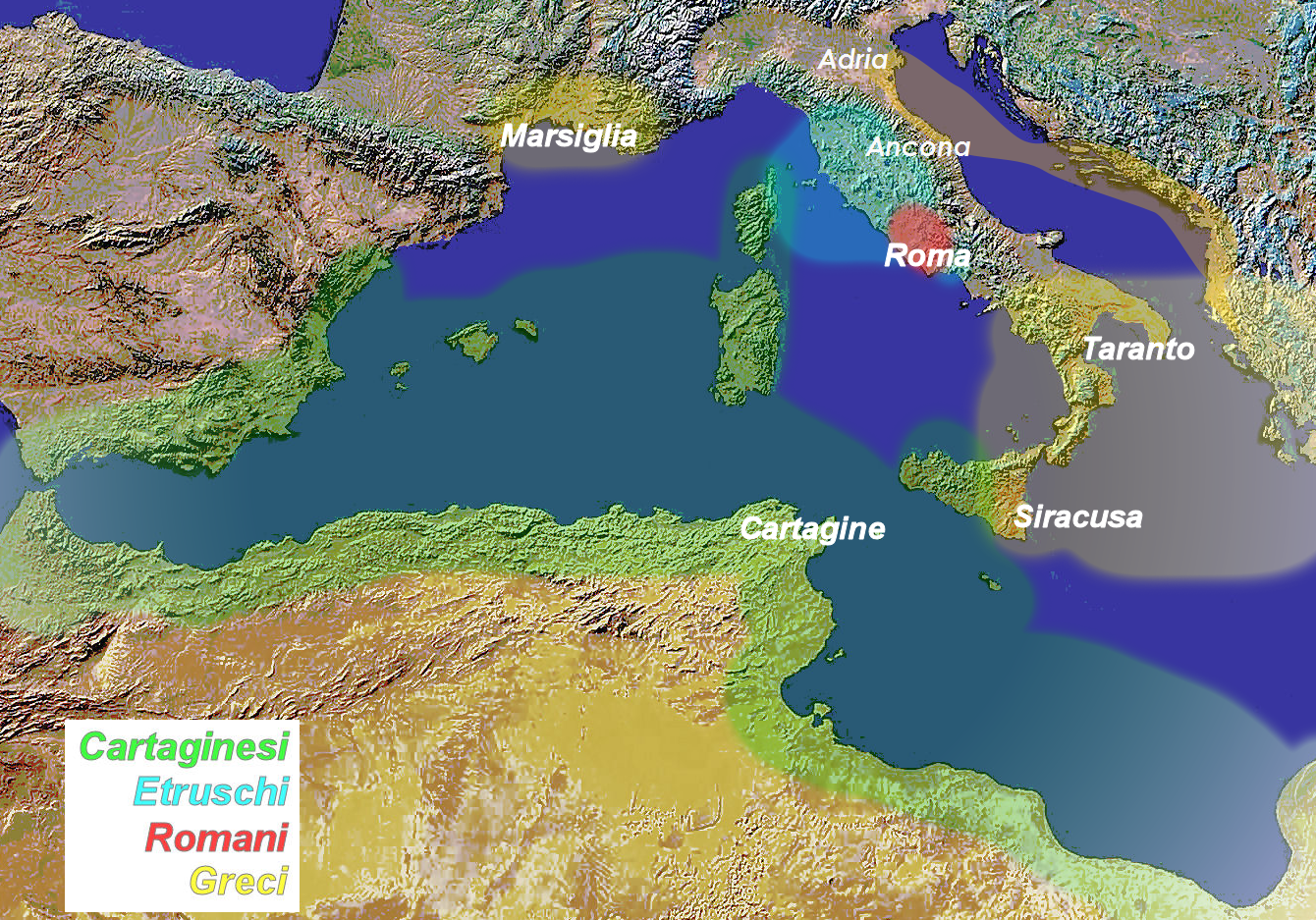
Carthage expands its influence across the Mediterranean; the Etruscans are under attack from Rome and Gauls.

=== Implications ===
Carthage saw Rome as a possible adversary that had resisted invasion and in war was proving itself potentially dangerous. Rome also controlled a large amount of territory that was larger, if not richer, than its perennial rival Syracuse. Moreover, the fact that Carthage allowed Phoenician merchants to operate in Rome shows that Carthage did not fear commercial competition from Rome and that it could operate its own territories and treated Rome as an upcoming potential client that should be put under its political control.

It is therefore to the credit of Carthaginian diplomacy that the revision to the 509 BC treaty imposed additional restrictions on Rome. It was written while Carthage was heavily engaged in military and therefore financial obligations. Additionally, the prohibition against Rome's founding of cities did not appear in the first treaty and shows that Carthage may have caught on to the method of Roman expansion; commerce did not interest Rome as much as the control and the exploitation of its territory. To the Romans, if an area was deserted it would be substantially occupied. If the area was inhabited, it would be conquered and forced to pay in assets and troops and eventually to accept Roman or Latin colonies.

== Third treaty, 306 BC ==
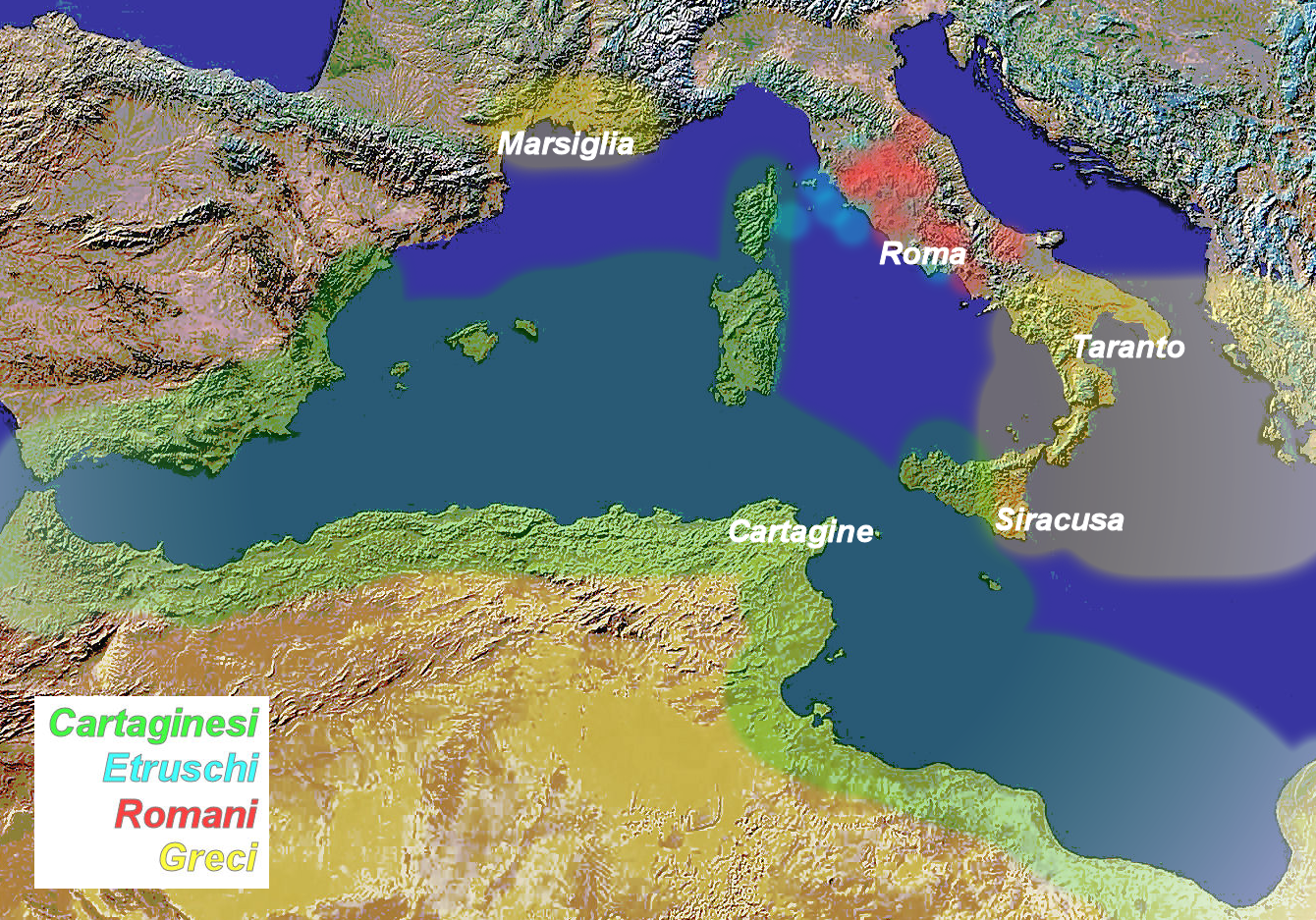
Carthage operates in Sicily without success; Rome is engaged in the Samnite Wars.

=== Background ===
During this period, Rome was in control of most of southern Etruria and the territory of Campania, and in the middle of its wars with the Samnites. Begun in 343 BC, they would not be concluded until 290 BC and had become a regional revolt, with the populations of Latium and Etruria trying to free themselves from Roman rule.

There were other incidents causing unrest, in other parts of the region. Alexander the Great died in June 323 BC, and the territory that he had conquered was being fought over by the Diadochi, the generals of the Macedonian army; Egypt, Greece, Macedonia, Asia Minor, and Syria were involved in incessant wars that threatened peaceful trade; and Agathocles ascended the throne of Syracuse in 316 BC and began a campaign to rid Sicily of the Carthaginians and in 311 BC, having been defeated in Sicily, carried the war to Africa before allying himself with Cyrenaica the following year.

In 303 BC, Rome and Taranto concluded a treaty that fixed the limits of Roman navigation at the Lacine promontory (see Capo Colonna), and by 306 BC, Rome had come to an agreement with Rhodes, another city undergoing strong commercial expansion.

=== Existence and terms of the treaty ===
While Polybius claimed that the treaty never existed but was a forgery of the pro-Carthaginian historian Philinus, modern research suggests that such a treaty did in fact exist. Philinus claimed that the treaty included Rome's agreement not to enter Sicily and Carthage's agreement not to set foot on the peninsula, and the stipulations on Carthage did not change, but Rome now found itself shut out of the Sicilian market.

== Fourth treaty, 279 BC ==
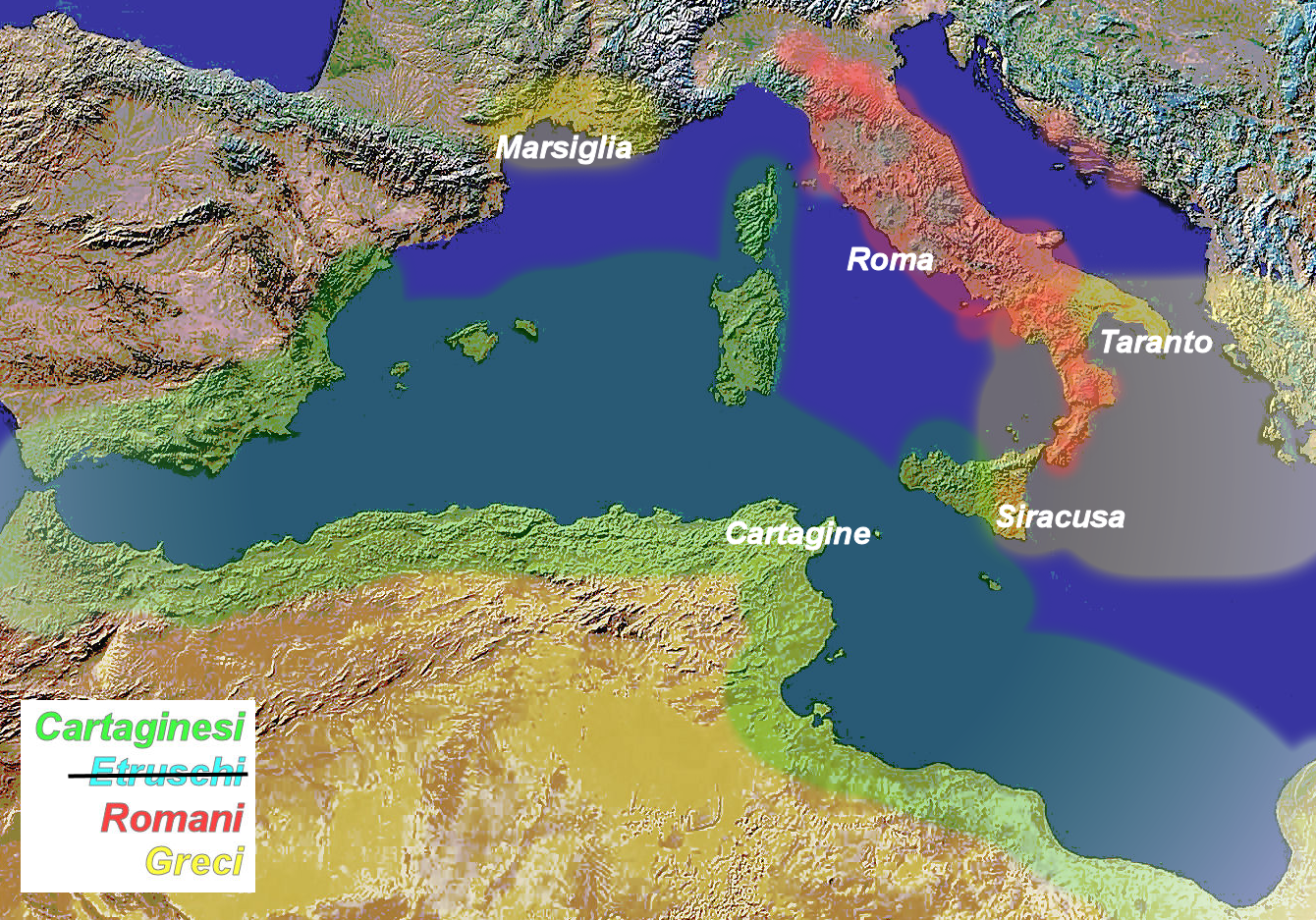
Rome controls almost the whole Italian Peninsula. Rome and Carthage, in direct competition.

=== Background ===
The Samnite Wars officially ended in 290 BC, and the subsequent actions of Rome within its territory had reduced the pressure of the Italian populace on the Greek cities in southern Italy, and particularly Taranto. The Italians themselves were being attacked by the Roman army. Taranto was experiencing a period of wealth and expansion, to the point of securing a treaty that limited Roman navigation (see above). In 282 BC, ten Roman ships appeared in Tarantine waters, violating the treaty, but they were either destroyed or forced to escape. When a Roman delegation was sent to request restitution for the ships and the captured prisoners, it was insulted, and war between the two states began in 281 BC. The Tarantines at first tried to form an anti-Roman league with the Italic populace, but it was considered to be insufficient. Thus, in 280 BC, they requested the assistance of Pyrrhus to lead the war against the Romans.

Pyrrhus arrived with an army of 25,000 men and 20 elephants in Taranto, when it was succumbing to the Roman army, and presented himself as the champion of Greece against the advance of the Italic barbarians. Pyrrhus's attack on Rome was heralded as a success: the Battle of Heraclea in Lucania against the legions under Publius Valerius Laevinus was won thanks to the use of elephants, which the Romans had never seen and called them Lucanian bulls. In 279 BC, a second great battle, the Battle of Asculum, at Ascoli Satriano, was seen as a victory by Pyrrhus over the forces of the consuls Publius Sulpicius Saverrio and Publius Decius Mus. That battle, however, exacted heavy losses on the victor that were so great that it inspired the term "Pyrrhic victory". Pyrrhus subsequently returned to Taranto.

Syracuse remained at war with Carthage and, after the death of Agathocles, was further embroiled in a civil war. The former, trying to change its lot and taking advantage of the fact that Pyrrhus had married Agathocles's daughter, offered him the crown of Sicily in exchange for helping it throw off the Carthaginians. Pyrrhus accepted, partly to leave the peninsula and to avoid the Romans. Pyrrhus landed in Sicily and was successful in pushing the Carthaginians to the Lilybaeum, on the western coast. Those manoeuvres by Syracuse and Pyrrhus prompted Carthage to sign the fourth treaty with Rome.

=== Terms of the treaty ===
The treaty contained the same provisions as the two earlier treaties, with the addition of the following.

- If Rome or Carthage make a treaty of alliance against Pyrrhus, both states were to make it on such terms as not to preclude one giving aid to the other if one's territory is attacked.
- If either the Romans or the Carthaginians stand in need of help, Carthage was to supply the ships, whether for transport or war, but each state was to pay for its own men employed on the ships.
- The Carthaginians were to give aid by sea to the Romans if necessary, but no one was to compel the crews of the ships to disembark against their will.

=== Implications and aftermath ===
While each party to the treaty was not obliged to come to the aid of the other, the treaty was an attempt by Carthage, which felt itself less able to carry out land warfare, to drag Rome into a land war in Sicily. The Carthaginians would supply ships for the transport of troops and pay the cost of supplies and cargo. The treaty also implied that Carthage was offering Rome the help of its navy against Pyrrhus since Roman generals, such as Publius Cornelius Scipio, commonly used the sailors of its transport ships alongside the soldiers in battle.

An improvement in Rome's condition followed soon after the treaty was put in place, which acknowledged Rome's increased military and economic powers. The treaty, on the other hand, betrayed Carthage's relative weakness in conceding that Rome was an equal, which was probably a result of its difficulties in Sicily. It may also have been the treaty that led the Romans to appreciate their growing importance and power of and the limits of Carthaginian power. Rome would subsequently defeat Pyrrhus, who had defeated the Carthaginians. Rome needed only to extend its reach to conquer rich Sicily, with its grain reserves.

In 275 BC, after the defeat of Maleventum (Beneventum), Pyrrhus returned to Epirus, and Rome was left master of the entire Italian peninsula south of the Tusco-Emilian Apennines. The First Punic War began eleven years later, in 264 BC.

== Subsequent treaties ==
The Treaty of Lutatius was the agreement between Carthage and Rome of 241 BC (amended in 237 BC), that ended the First Punic War after 23 years of conflict.

== See also ==
- Rome
- Carthage
- The Punic Wars, specifically, the First Punic War
- Ancient Greece
  - Magna Graecia
  - Pyrrhus of Epirus
  - Alexander the Great
- List of ancient treaties

== Bibliography ==
=== Primary sources ===
- Polybios, Ἱστορίαι (Historiai) (c. 145–120 BCE, in Greek).
  - Polybius (1962) [1889]. "Treaties between Rome and Carthage". Histories, Book 3. Translated by Evelyn S. Shuckburgh. Macmillan / Bloomington / Perseus Digital Library.
- Livius, Ab Urbe Condita. Liber VII. (c. 27–9 BCE, in Latin).
  - Livy (1905). From the Founding of the City. Book 7. Translated by Canon Roberts.

=== Literature ===
- Serrati, John (2006). "Neptune's Altars: The Treaties between Rome and Carthaga (509-226 B.C.)". The Classical Quarterly. 56 (1). Cambridge University Press: 113–134. doi:10.1017/S0009838806000103. ISSN 0009-8388. JSTOR 4493392.
