= List of Roman generals =

Roman generals were general officers of the Roman army, the principal ground force of Ancient Rome. They commanded the army during the numerous military conflicts Rome was involved in during the period of classical antiquity.

== A ==
- Manius Acilius Glabrio (consul 67 BC)
- Manius Acilius Glabrio (consul 191 BC)
- Titus Aebutius Elva
- Aegidius
- Lucius Aemilius Barbula
- Marcus Aemilius Lepidus (triumvir)
- Lucius Aemilius Paulus Macedonicus
- Marcus Aemilius Scaurus (praetor 56 BC)
- Marcus Antonius (orator)
- Gaius Antonius
- Lucius Antonius (brother of Mark Antony)
- Marcus Antonius Creticus
- Mark Antony
- Manius Aquillius (consul 129 BC)
- Arrian
- Lucius Artorius Castus
- Gaius Asinius Pollio (consul 40 BC)
- Aulus Atilius Calatinus
- Marcus Atilius Regulus
- Publius Attius Varus
- Aureolus
- Graltinus Maximus Aurelius

== B ==
- Lucius Cornelius Balbus (minor) – defeated the Garamantes
- Barbatio
- Belisarius
- Lucilius Bassus
- Publius Ventidius Bassus
- Bonifacius
- Bonosus (usurper)
- Decimus Junius Brutus Albinus – commanded Caesar's fleet in the war against the Veneti
- Decimus Junius Brutus Callaicus – led the Roman legions in the conquest of western Iberia
- Marcus Junius Brutus

== C ==
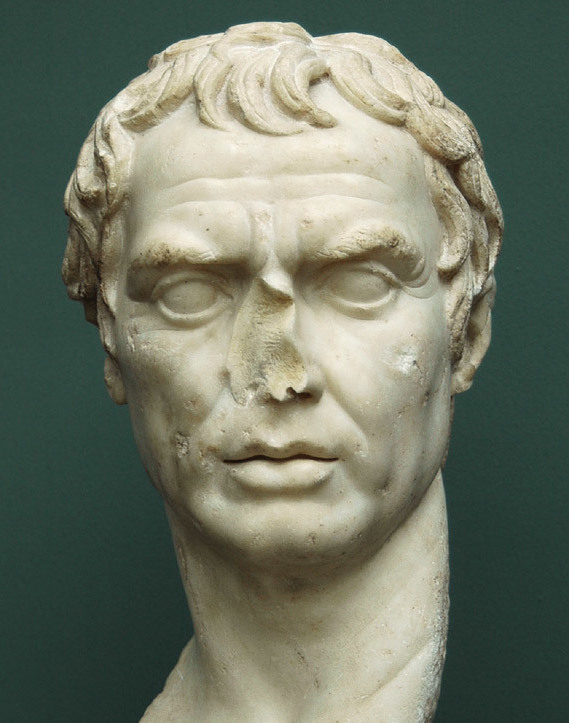
Bust of Scipio Africanus

- Quintus Caecilius Metellus
- Aulus Caecina Alienus
- Marcus Calpurnius Bibulus
- Gaius Calpurnius Piso (consul 67 BC)
- Gaius Carrinas (praetor 82 BC)
- Gaius Carrinas (consul 43 BC)
- Gaius Cassius Longinus
- Quintus Tullius Cicero
- Gaius Julius Civilis
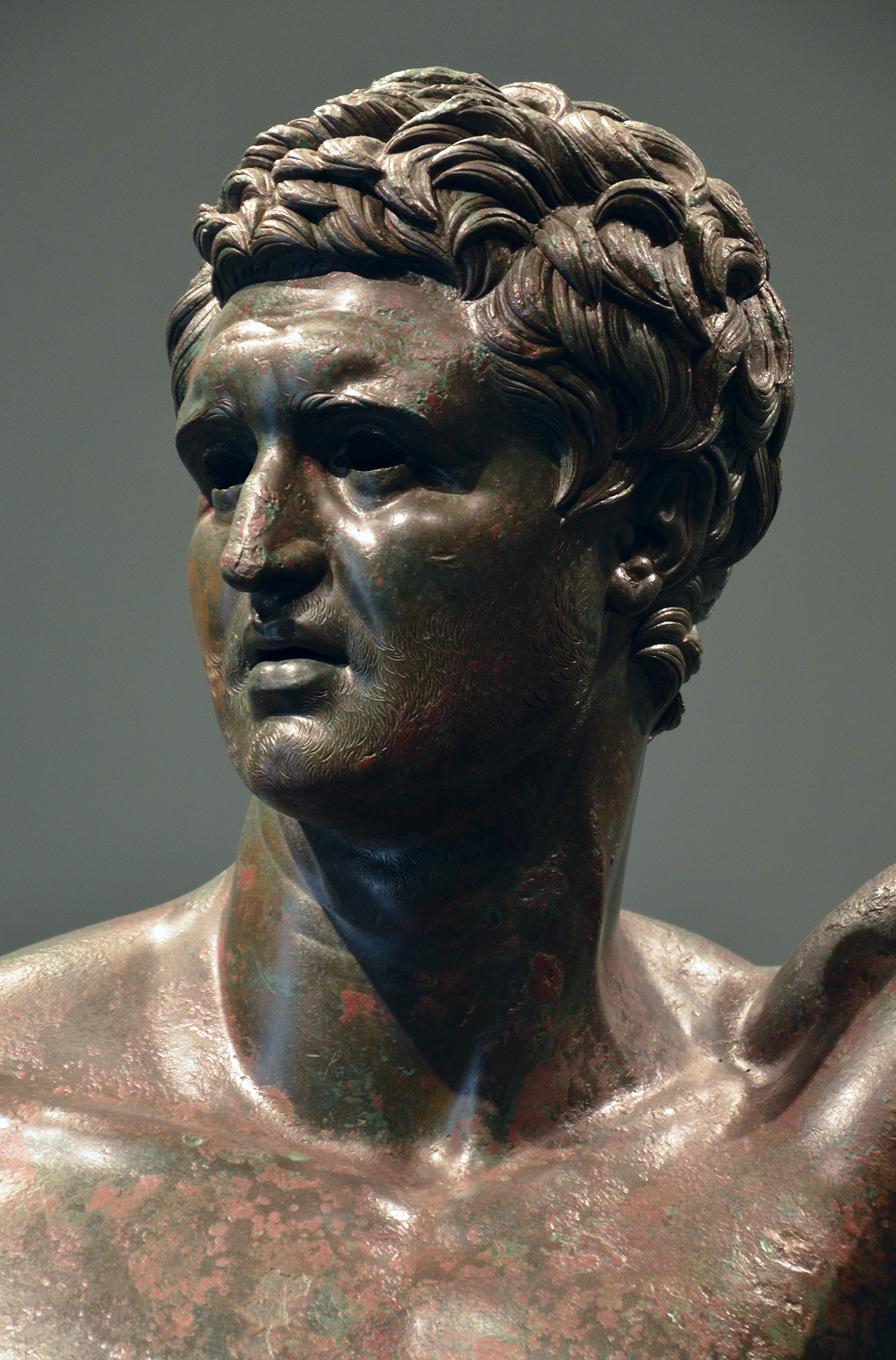
  Statue possibly depicting Scipio Aemilianus
- Appius Claudius Caudex
- Marcus Claudius Marcellus
- Gaius Claudius Nero
- Claudius Pompeianus
- Publius Claudius Pulcher (consul 249 BC)
- Lucius Clodius Macer
- Gnaeus Domitius Corbulo
- Gaius Marcius Coriolanus
- Lucius Cornelius Cinna
- Gnaeus Cornelius Lentulus Clodianus
- Publius Cornelius Lentulus Spinther
- Lucius Cornelius Lentulus Crus
- Scipio Aemilianus
- Scipio Africanus
- Scipio Asiaticus
- Lucius Cornelius Scipio Barbatus
- Publius Cornelius Scipio Nasica

== D ==
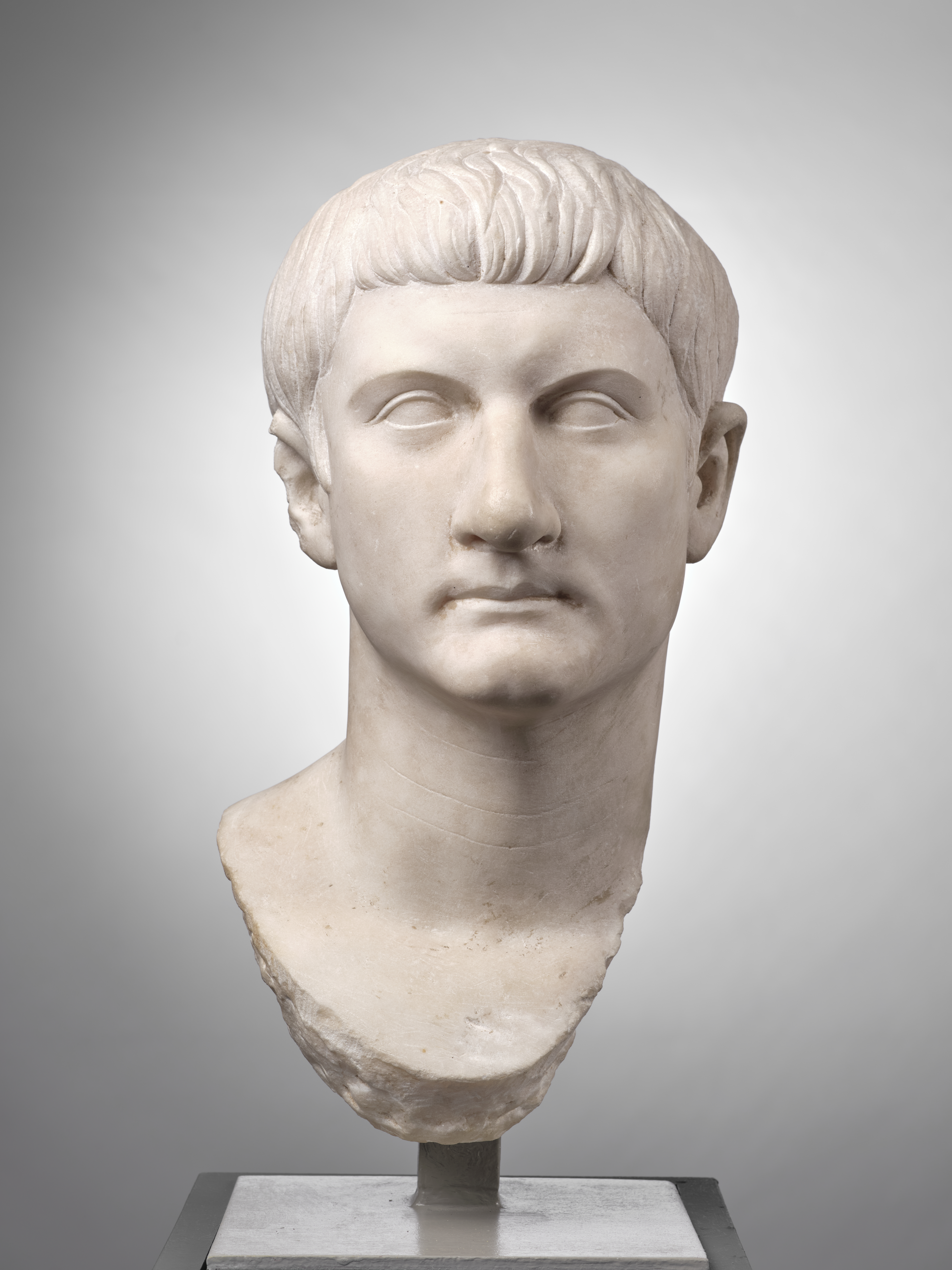
Portrait of Drusus

- Publius Decius Mus (consul 279 BC) – fought Pyrrhus of Epirus at the Battle of Asculum (279 BC)
- Publius Decius Mus (consul 340 BC) – awarded the Grass Crown during First Samnite War
- Publius Decius Mus (consul 312 BC)
- Dexippus
- Aulus Didius Gallus
- Titus Didius
- Gnaeus Domitius Ahenobarbus (consul 32 BC)
- Gnaeus Domitius Ahenobarbus (consul 122 BC)
- Gnaeus Domitius Calvinus
- Nero Claudius Drusus
- Drusus Julius Caesar
- Gaius Duilius

== F ==
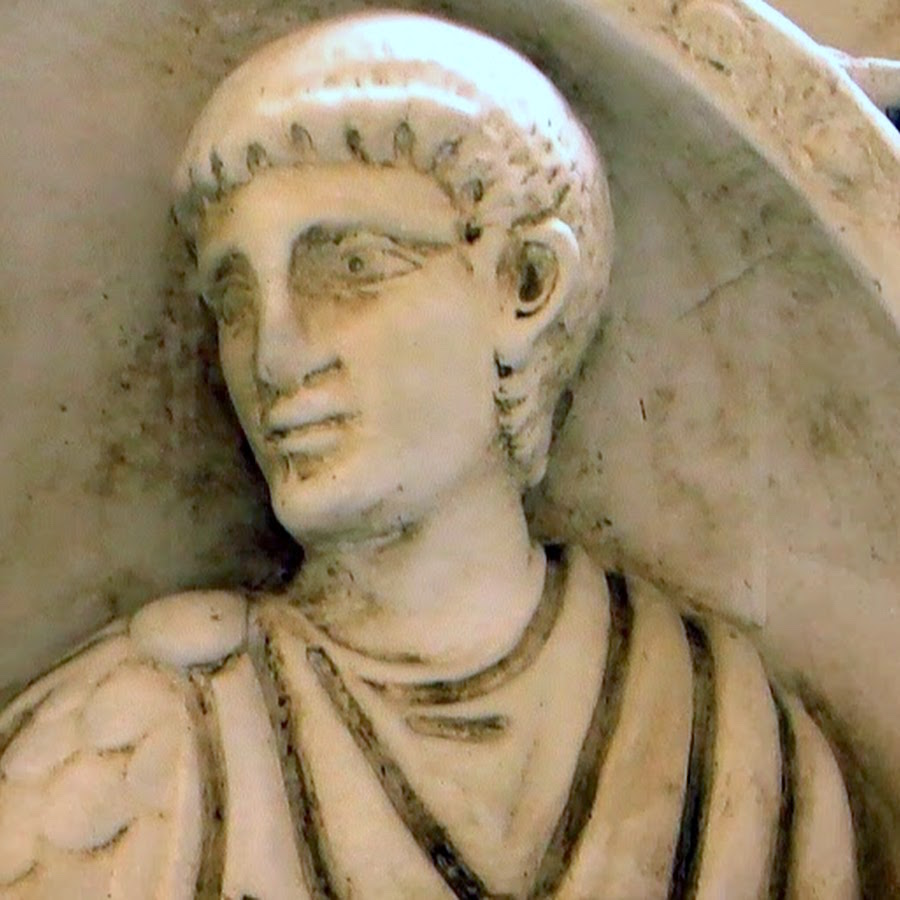
Relief depicting Flavius Aetius

- Quintus Fabius Maximus Rullianus
- Quintus Fabius Maximus Verrucosus
- Fabius Valens
- Gaius Flaminius
- Gaius Flavius Fimbria
- Quintus Fufius Calenus
- Fullofaudes
- Marcus Fulvius Flaccus (consul 125 BC)
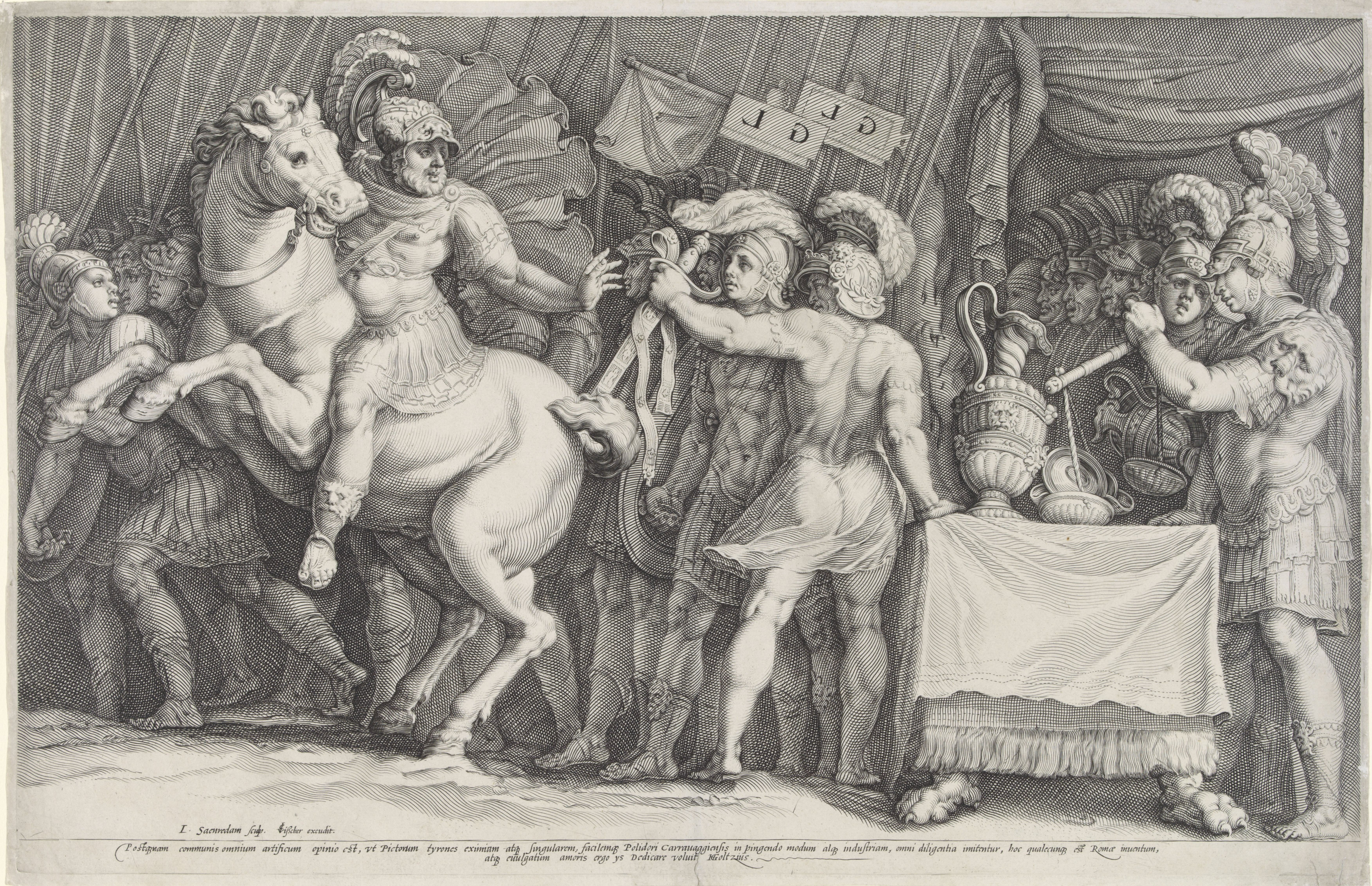
- Image of Marcus Furius Camillus arriving in Rome.
  Marcus Fulvius Flaccus (consul 264 BC)
- Quintus Fulvius Flaccus (consul 237 BC)
- Quintus Fulvius Flaccus (consul 179 BC)
- Marcus Fulvius Nobilior
- Marcus Furius Camillus
- Flavius Aetius
- Cornelius Fuscus

== G ==
Bust depicting Germanicus

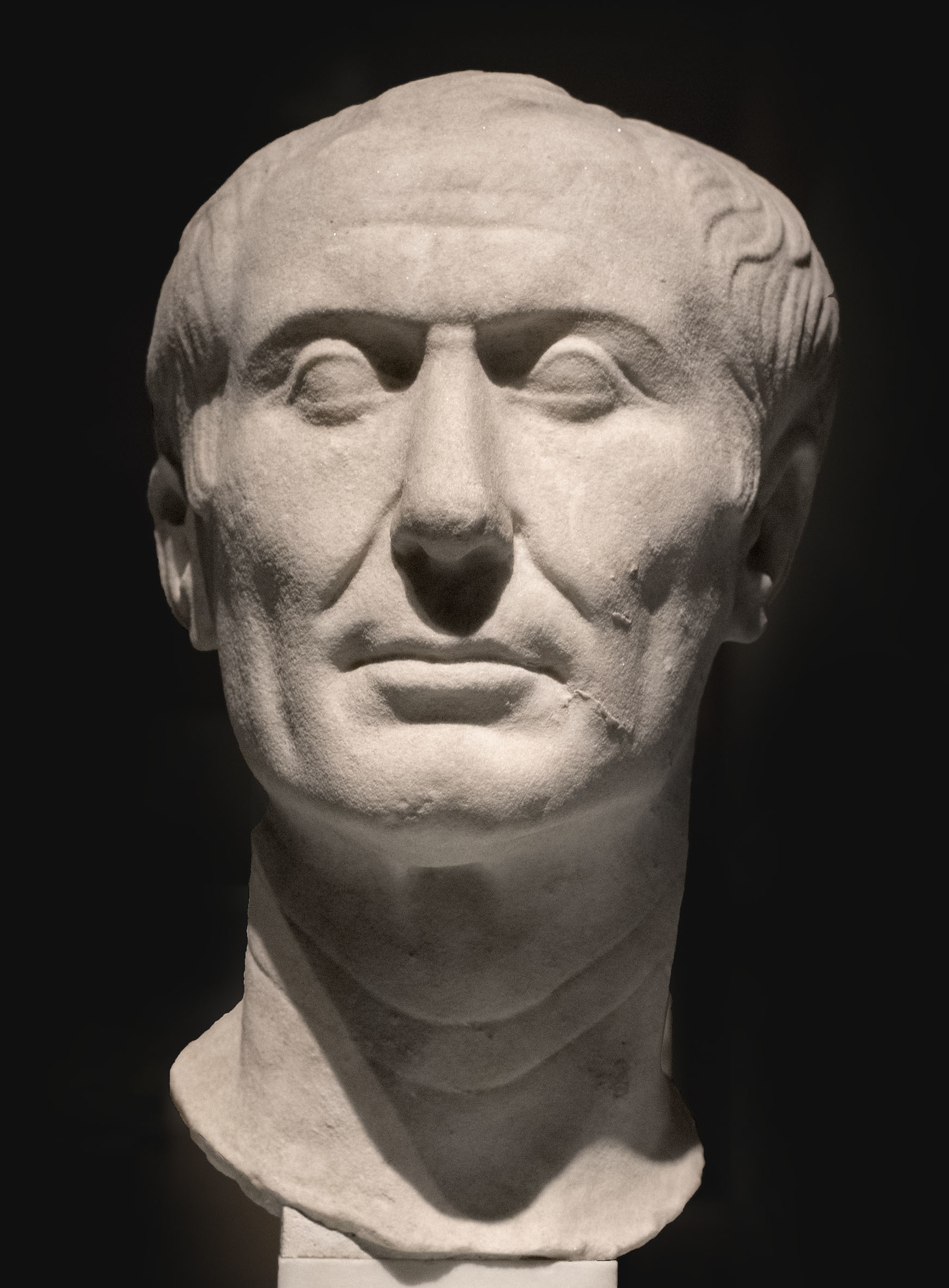
The Tusculum portrait, possibly the only surviving depiction of Julius Caesar from his lifetime

- Aulus Gabinius
- Gaius Julius Caesar the Elder
- Servius Sulpicius Galba (praetor 54 BC)
- Cestius Gallus
- Lucius Gellius
- Lucius Gellius Publicola
- Germanicus
- Gundobad
- Gaius Salvius Liberalis

== H ==
- Gnaeus Hosidius Geta – defeated Sabalus, chief of the Mauri

== J ==
- Lucius Julius Caesar
- Julius Caesar
- Lucius Junius Brutus founder of Roman republic

== L ==
- Titus Labienus
- Gaius Laelius
- Titus Larcius
- Marcus Aemilius Lepidus (consul 6)
- Publius Licinius Crassus Dives Mucianus
- Marcus Licinius Crassus
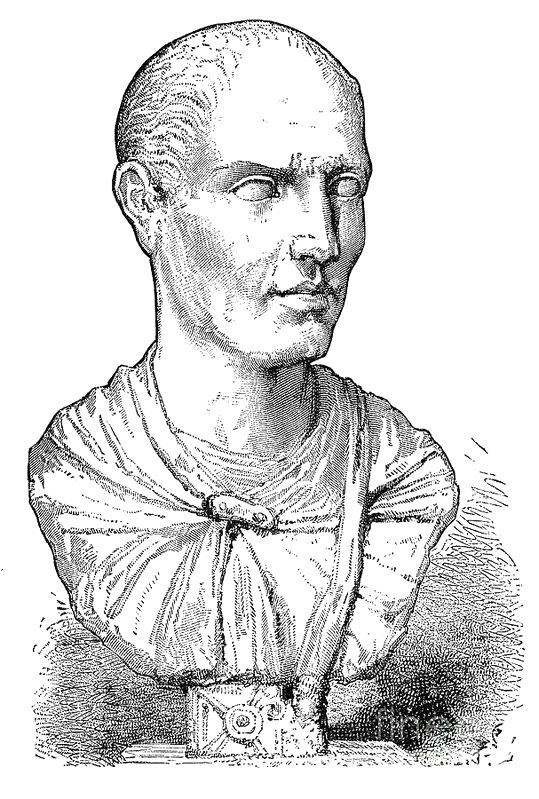
- Image of Lucullus
  Lucius Licinius Lucullus
- Litorius
- Lucullus
- Mucianus
- Quintus Ligarius
- Marcus Livius Salinator
- Marcus Lollius
- Quintus Lollius Urbicus
- Lucius Caecilius Metellus Denter
- Lucius Pinarius
- Gaius Lutatius Catulus
- Quintus Lutatius Catulus

== M ==
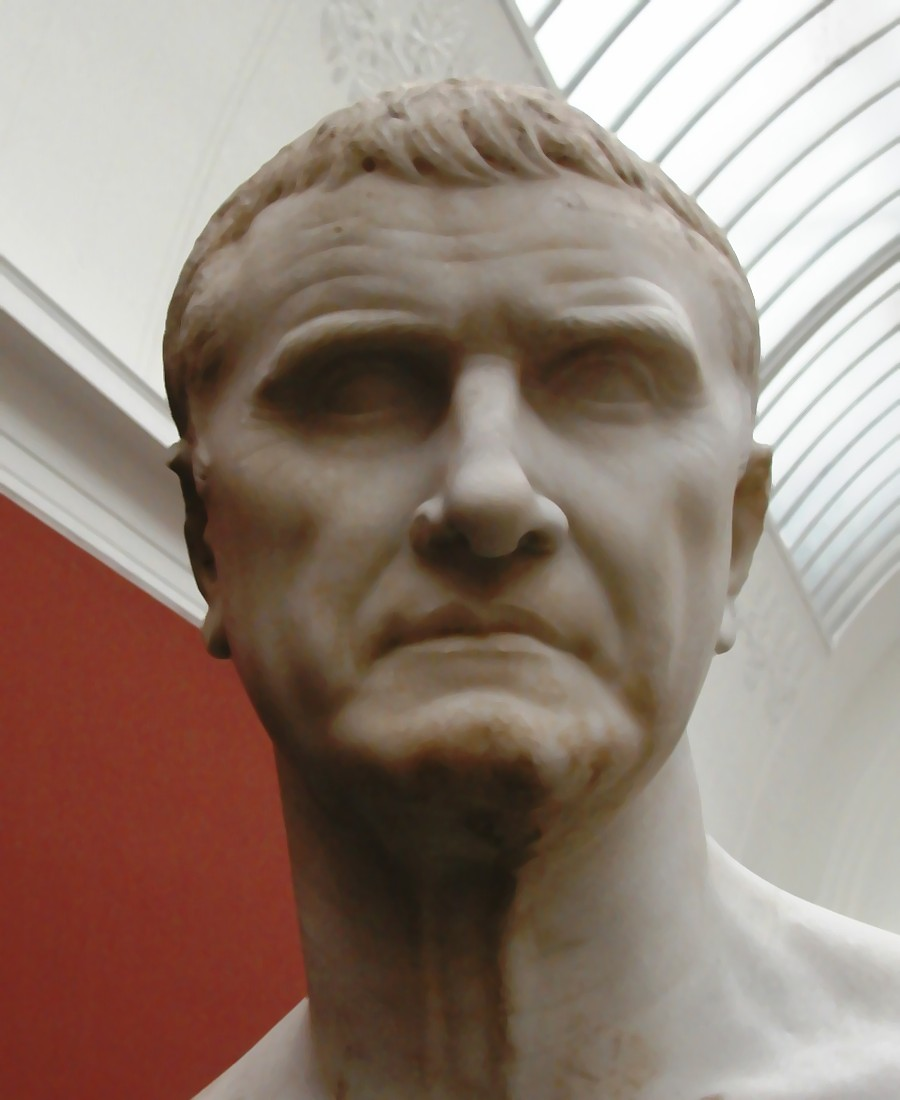
Bust of Marcus Licinius Crassus

- Gnaeus Mallius Maximus
- Titus Manlius Torquatus (consul 347 BC)
- Titus Manlius Torquatus (235 BC)
- Lucius Manlius Vulso Longus
- Gaius Marcius Rutilus
- Marcius Turbo
- Gaius Marius
- Gaius Marius the Younger
- Lucius Mummius Achaicus
- Marcus Valerius Maximianus

== N ==
- Tiberius Nero – commanded Caesar's fleet in the Alexandrian War
- Gaius Norbanus Flaccus
- Gaius Norbanus

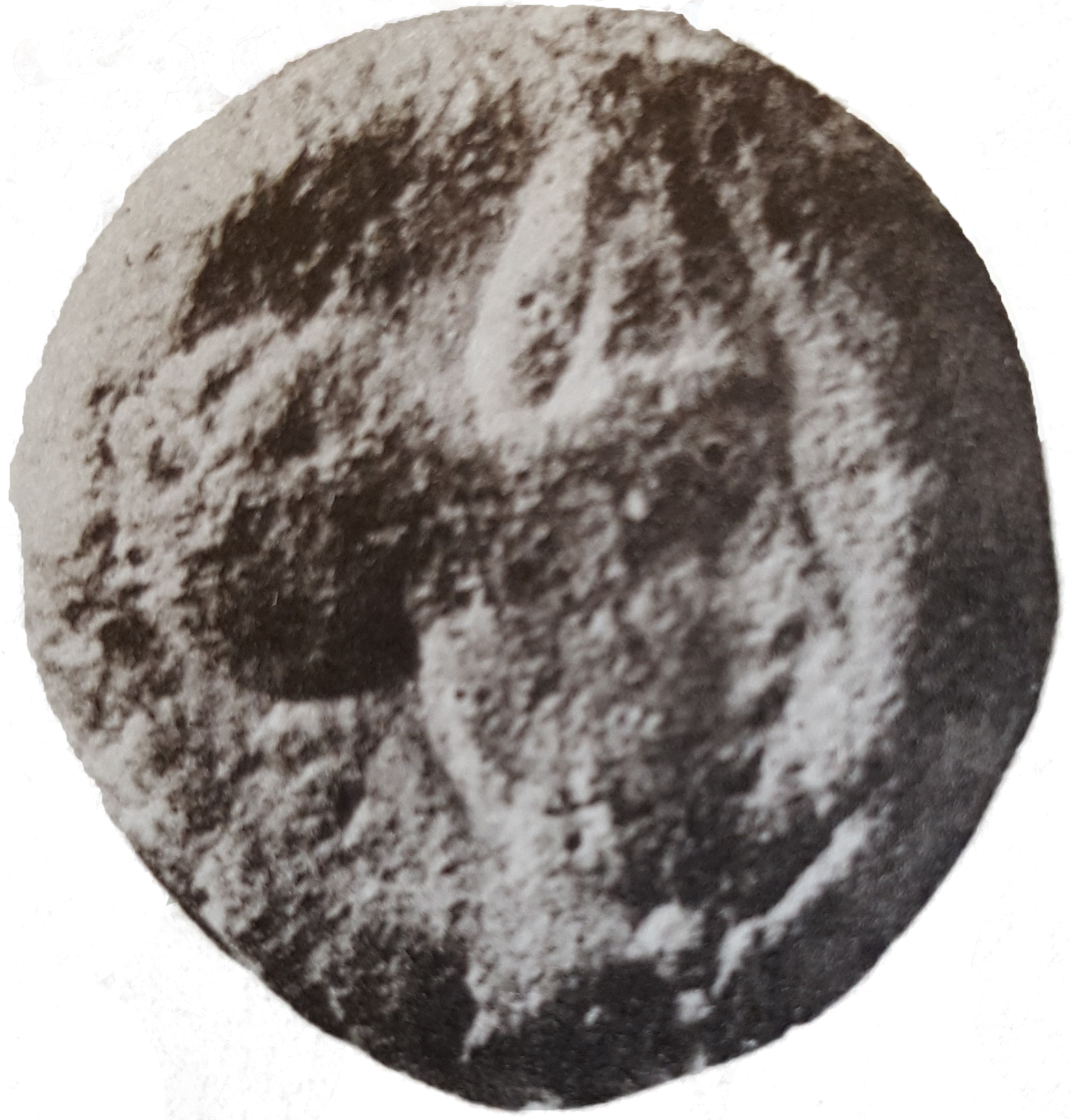
Coin possibly depicting Odaenathus wearing a diadem

== O ==
- Gaius Octavius – put down a slave rebellion at Thurii •
- Gnaeus Octavius
- Odaenathus
- Lucius Opimius
- Publius Ostorius Scapula – responsible for the defeat and capture of Caratacus

== P ==
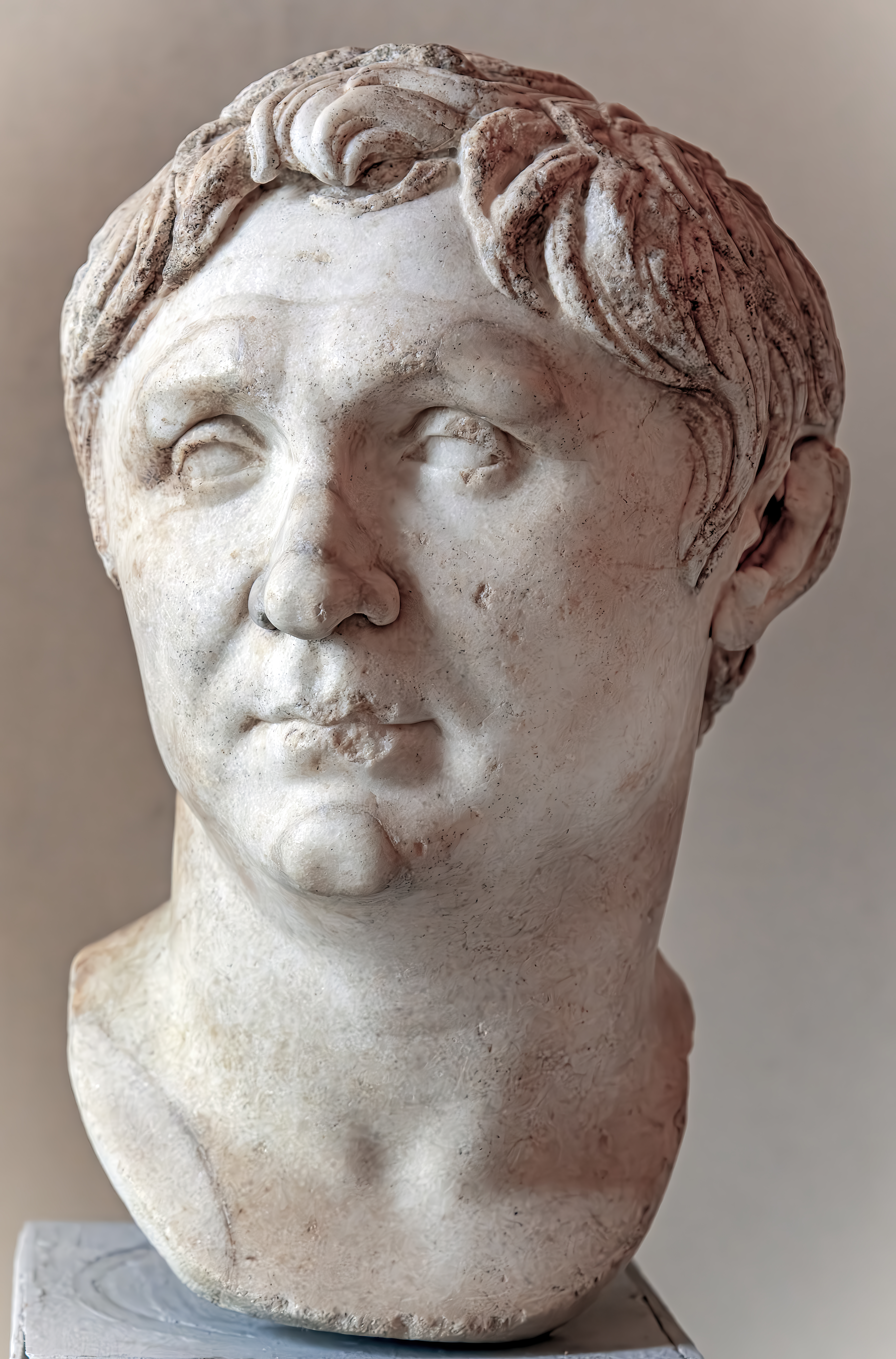
- Bust of Pompey
  Gnaeus Papirius Carbo
- Lucius Papirius Cursor
- Tiberius Claudius Paulinus
- Marcus Perperna Vento
- Marcus Perperna
- Quintus Petillius Cerialis
- Publius Petronius Turpilianus
- Lucius Calpurnius Piso (consul 15 BC)
- Aulus Plautius
- Gnaeus Pompeius
- Pompey
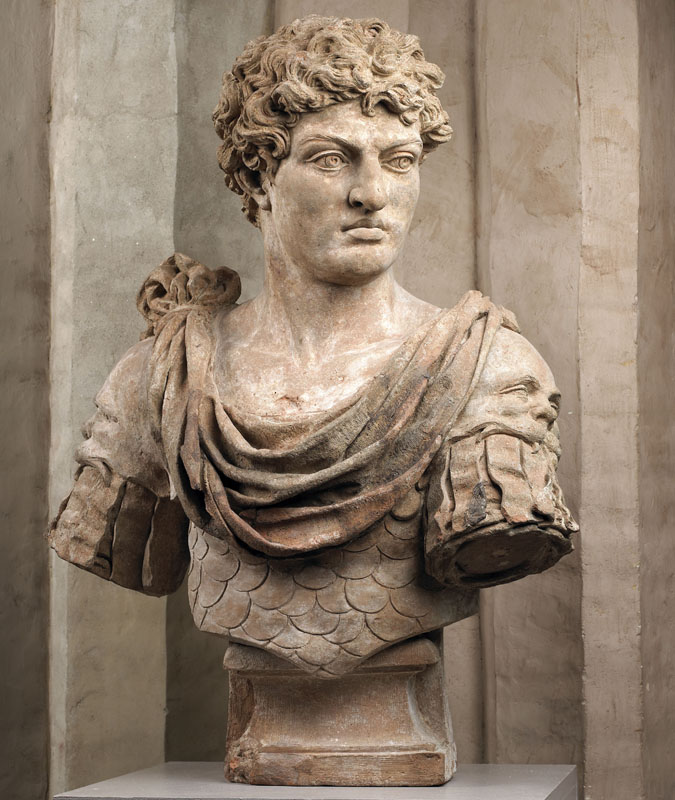
  Bust depicting Primus
- Sextus Pompeius
- Pompeius Strabo
- Pomponius Secundus
- Marcus Popillius Laenas
- Marcus Popillius Laenas (consul 173 BC)
- Lucius Postumius Albinus
- Marcus Antonius Primus
- Publius Cornelius Dolabella (consul 283 BC)
- Marcus Pupius Piso Frugi Calpurnianus

== Q ==
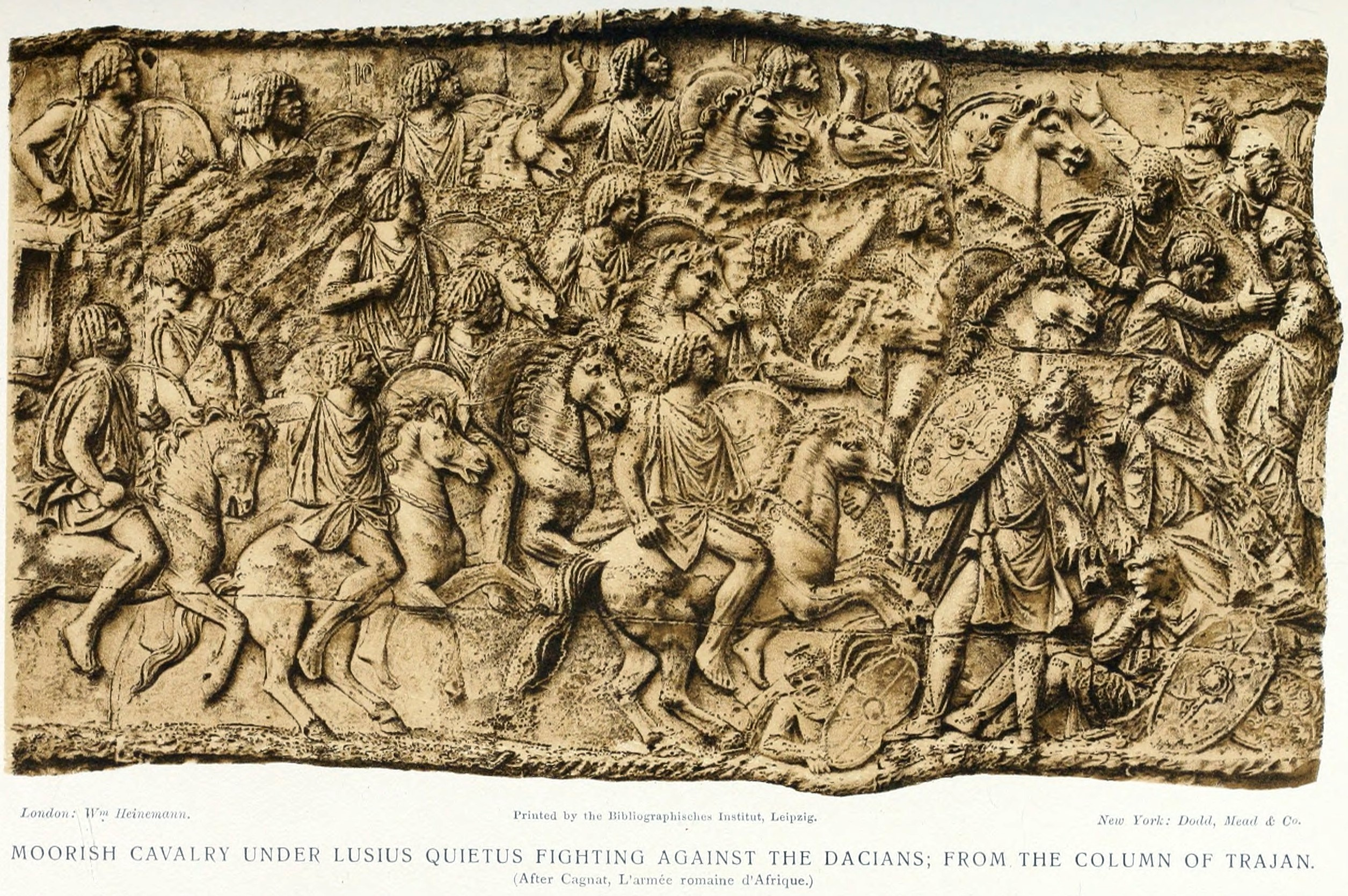
Depiction of Lusius Quietus leading the Berber cavalry in the Dacian wars

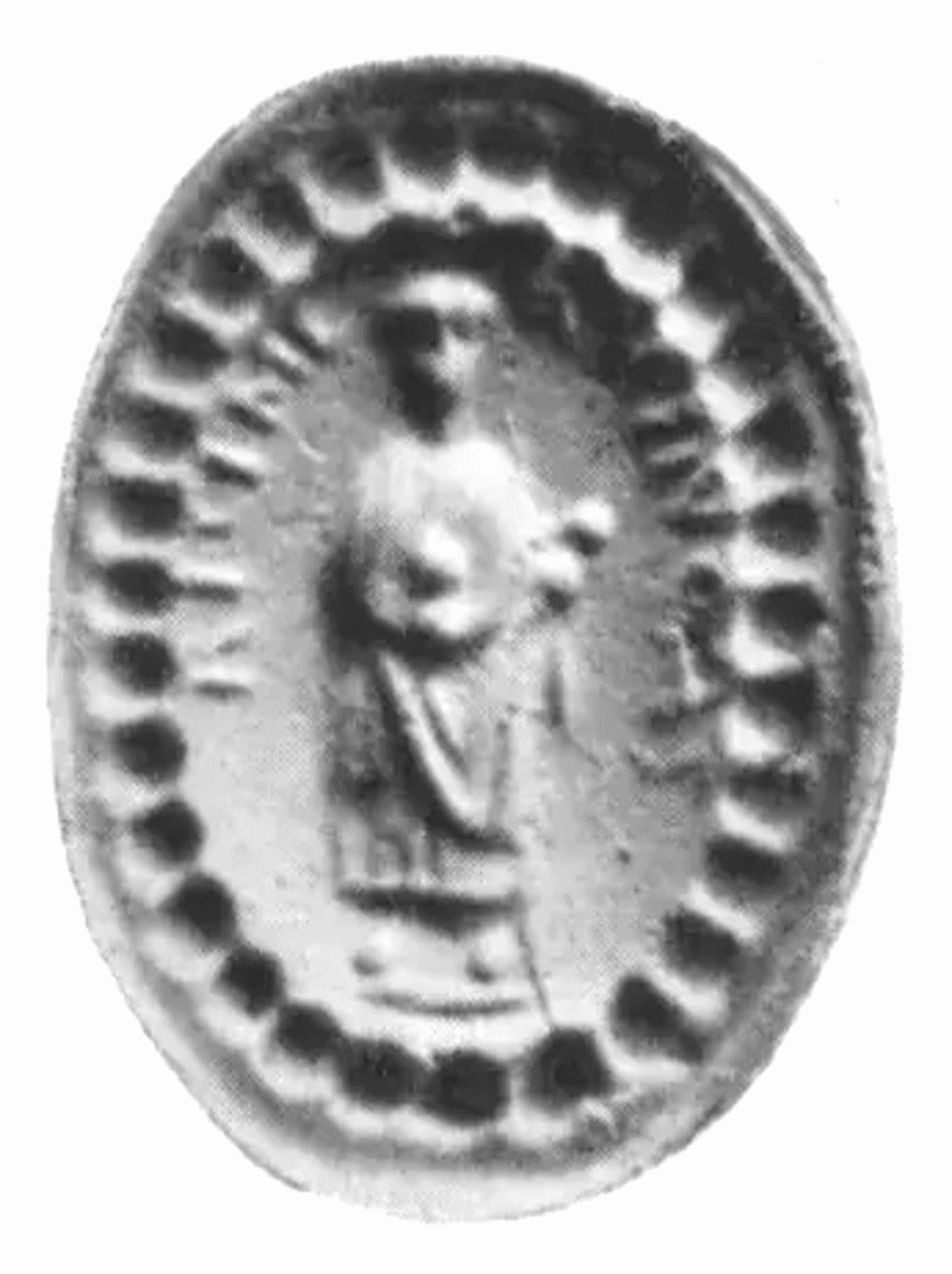
Seal depicting Ricimer

- Lusius Quietus
- Lucius Quinctius Cincinnatus – dictator
- Publius Quinctilius Varus – lost three Roman legions and his own life when attacked by Germanic leader Arminius in the Battle of the Teutoburg Forest
- Titus Quinctius Flamininus
- Quintus Aemilius
- Quintus Pedius

== R ==
- Ricimer
- Marcus Roscius Coelius
- Publius Rutilius Lupus (consul 90 BC)
- Publius Rutilius Rufus

== S ==
- Quintus Salvidienus Rufus
- Gaius Scribonius Curio (consul 76 BC)
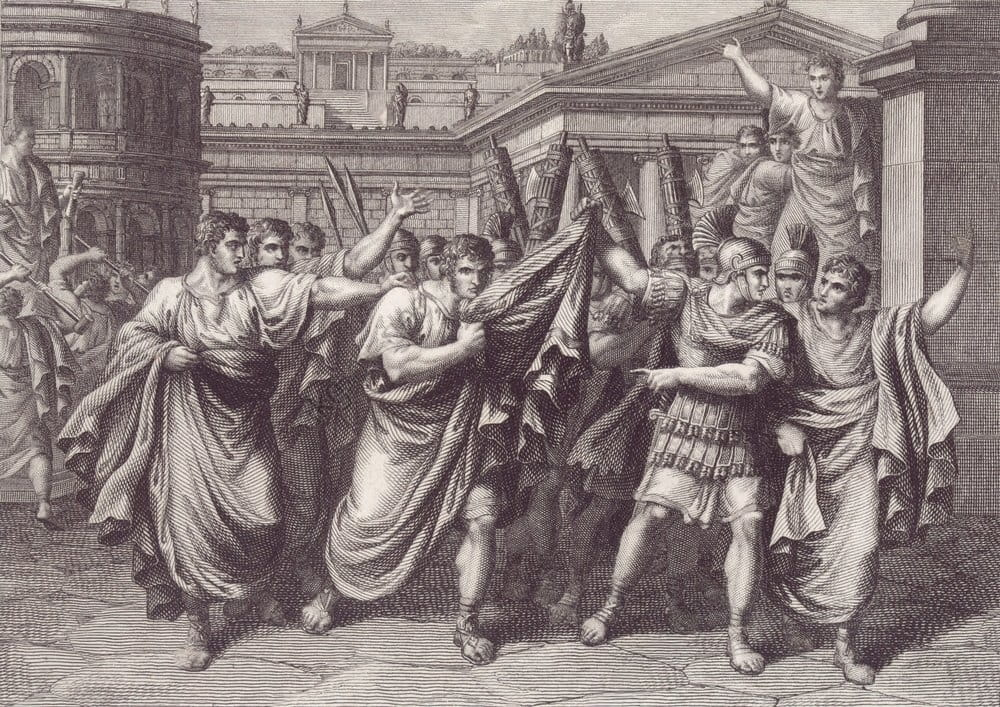
- Depiction of the arrest of Sejanus
  Gaius Scribonius Curio (praetor 49 BC)
- Sejanus
- Tiberius Sempronius Gracchus (consul 238 BC)
- Tiberius Sempronius Gracchus (consul 215 BC)
- Tiberius Sempronius Gracchus (consul 177 BC)
- Tiberius Sempronius Longus (consul 194 BC)
- Tiberius Sempronius Longus (consul 218 BC)
- Marcus Sergius
- Quintus Sertorius
- Gaius Servilius Ahala
- Quintus Servilius Caepio (consul 106 BC)
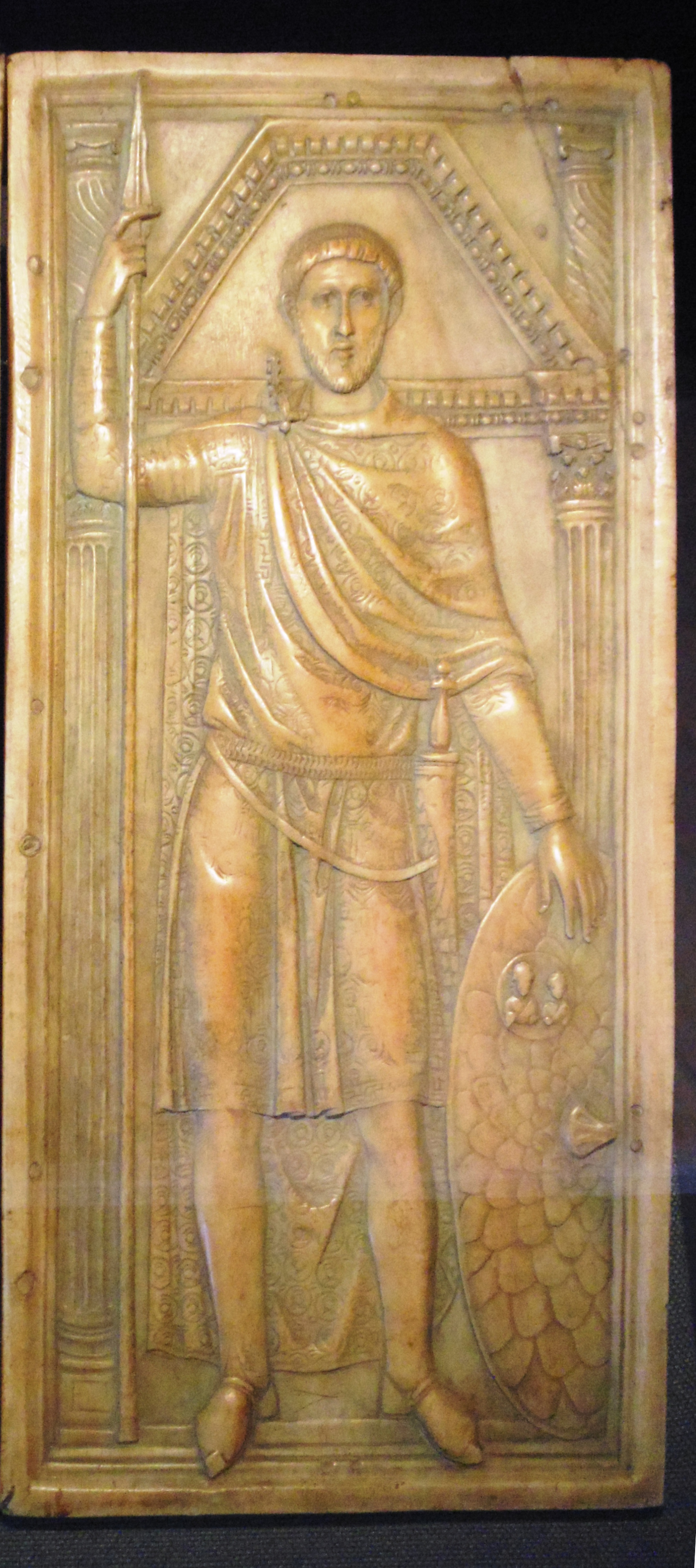
- Ivory carving depicting Stilicho
  Gnaeus Servilius Geminus
- Quintus Servilius Caepio (quaestor 103 BC)
- Sextus Julius Severus
- Lucius Cornelius Sisenna
- Lucius Flavius Silva
- Gaius Sosius
- Staurakios
- Stilicho
- Gaius Suetonius Paulinus
- Publius Cornelius Sulla
- Lucius Cornelius Sulla Felix
- Publius Sulpicius Galba Maximus
- Servius Sulpicius Galba (consul 144 BC)
- Publius Sulpicius Rufus
- Syagrius
- Scipio
- Sextus Calpurnius Classicus (senator and general of Hadrian)

== T ==
- Marcus Terentius Varro Lucullus
- Gaius Terentius Varro
- Titus Vinius
- Trebonius
- Titus

== U ==
- Ursicinus (magister equitum) – Entrusted to suppress the Jewish revolt against Gallus (Constantius Gallus)

== V ==
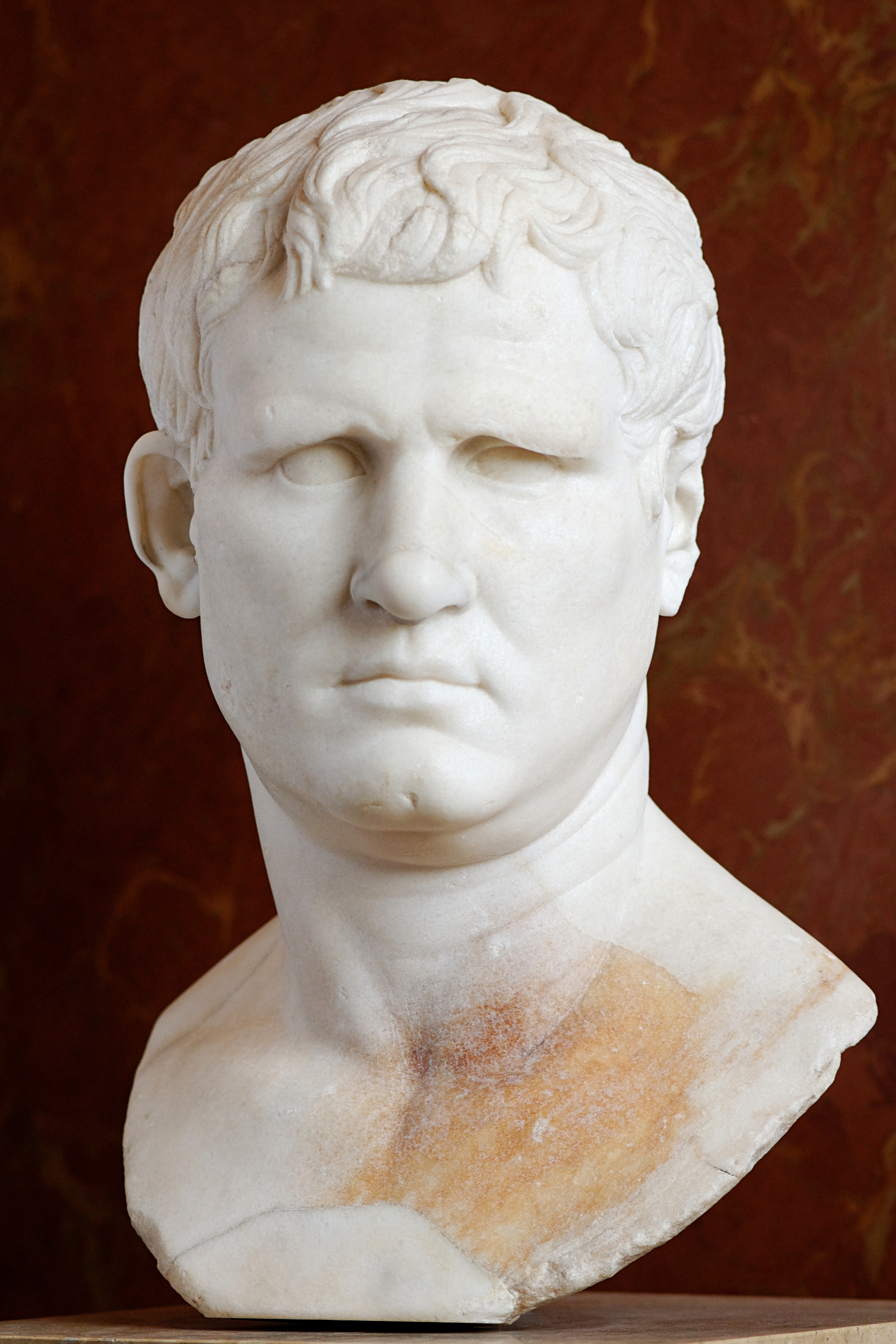
- Bust of Agrippa
  Valens (usurper)
- Marcus Valerius Corvus
- Gaius Valerius Flaccus (consul)
- Lucius Valerius Flaccus
- Publius Valerius Laevinus
- Marcus Valerius Laevinus
- Manius Valerius Maximus Corvinus Messalla
- Marcus Valerius Messalla Corvinus
- Flavius Valila Theodosius
- Marcus Vipsanius Agrippa
- Vespasian
