= Rofalco =

Coordinates: 42.5703°N 11.7131°E

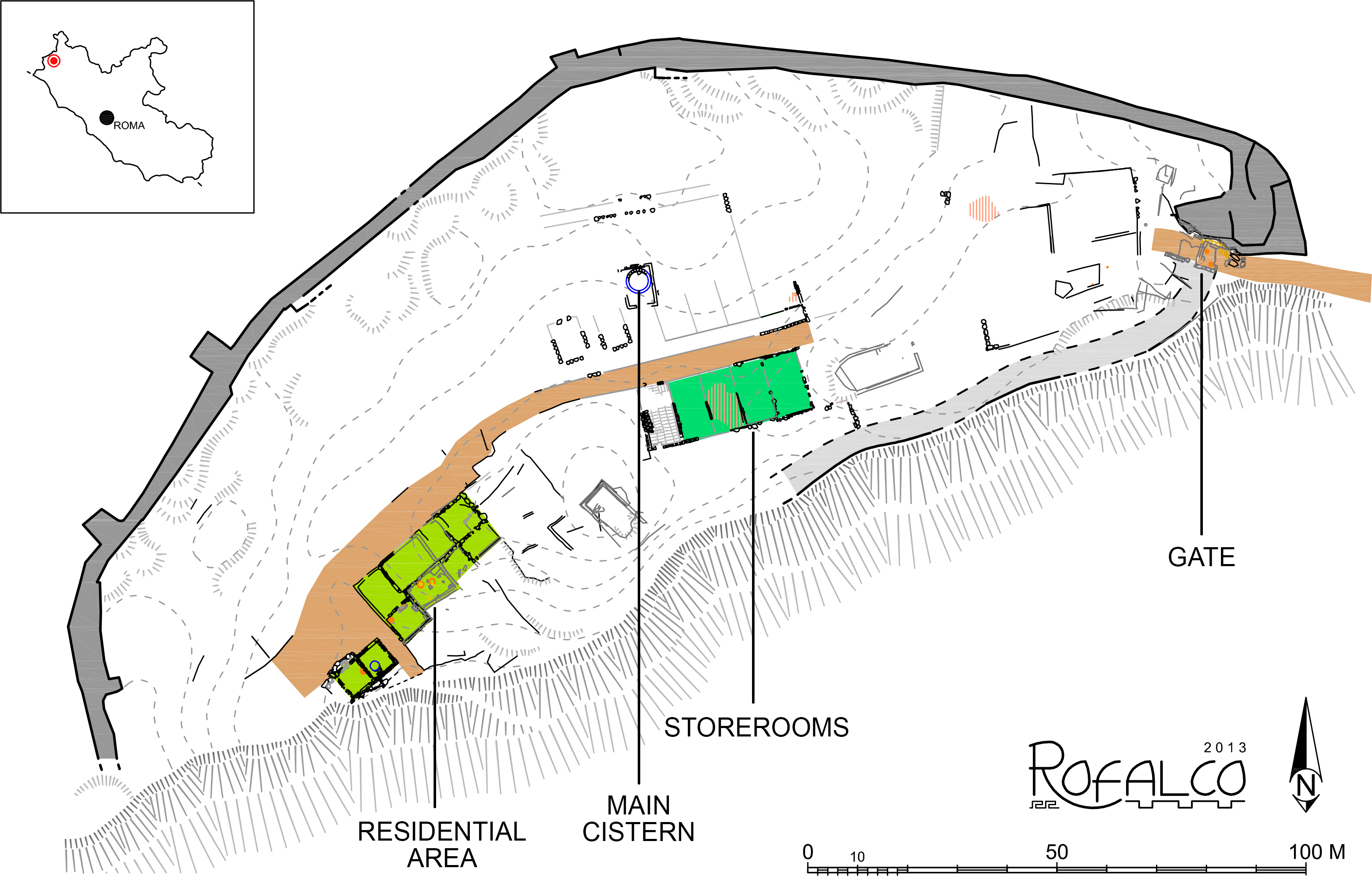
- Plan of Rofalco

- Location within Lazio
- Type: Settlement
- Periods: Roman Republic
- Cultures: Etruscan
- Location: Comune di Viterbo
- Region: Lazio

Site notes
- Excavation dates: yes

Rofalco was a fortified late-Etruscan settlement, located about twenty km north of Vulci, at the edge of the Selva del Lamone volcanic plateau. The site controlled the important natural route formed by the valley of the Olpeta stream and contributed to the defense and the organization of the southeastern portion of the ancient territory of Vulci.

Known at least since the 1970s, the site was explored for the first time systematically by the Roman Archaeology Association in 1981 and soon taken into account in several studies concerning the territory. Regular excavations were started in the summer of 1996 by Mauro Incitti, with the additional goal of counteracting the damage caused by looters. In recent years, in addition to research activities, an outreach project concerning all aspects of the site has been gradually developed in accordance with the different institutions in charge. The nineteen annual excavations that have been carried out up till now were done by more than 550 Italian and foreign volunteers, who investigated the defensive structures and several of the buildings of the town.

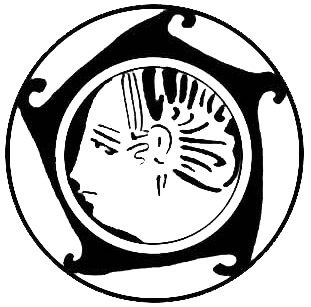
Logo of Rofalco

== History ==
=== Bronze Age ===
Excavations conducted to date in Rofalco have identified the initial occupation of the site to the Bronze Age. The remains are limited in number and come exclusively from Etruscan layers so that the appearance of this earlier settlement cannot be reconstructed and could, in fact, be quite small, perhaps only seasonally occupied. At least three small rock niches open on the side of the ridge just below the Etruscan settlement, provide a possible reason for the rise of this prehistoric settlement.

=== Etruscan ===
The fortress of Rofalco is located within the territory of the ancient city of Vulci and controlled the major route from Lake Mezzano and the lower course of the Fiora river, on whose banks stood Vulci. In ancient times, the valley was an important natural passage linking the Tyrrhenian coast to Lake Bolsena, the Tiber Valley and the city of Orvieto. Between the 4th and 3rd centuries BCE, southern Etruria experienced a period of political uncertainty. In the territory of Vulci, this situation led to a reorganization of the campaigns and a foundation of medium and small settlements at strategic points in order to control the territory. The fortified site of Rofalco can be taken as an example of a small strategic settlement.

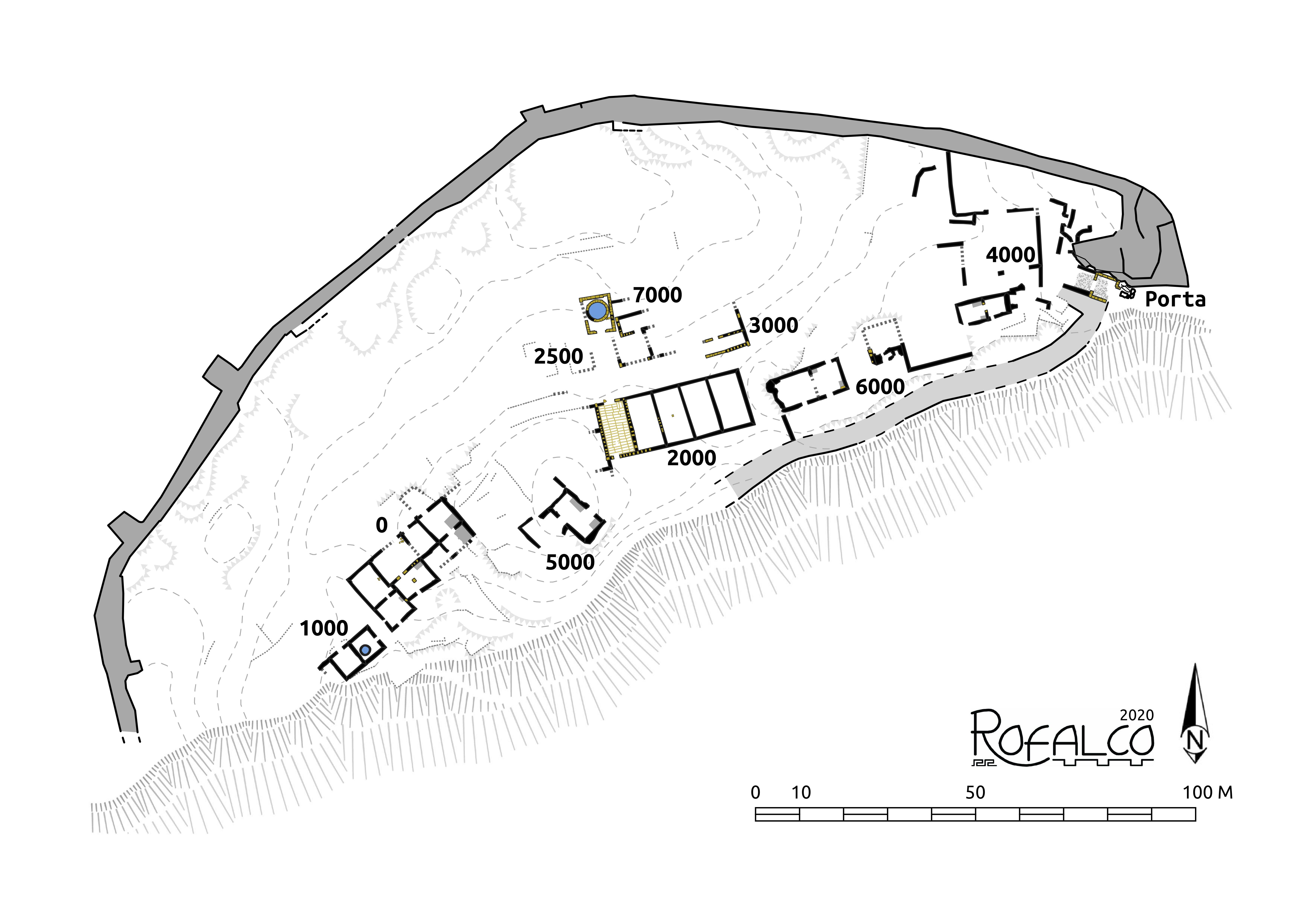
Plan of the Etruscan Fortress of Rofalco, with main settlement areas (Rofalco Project Archive, 2020).

=== Destruction ===
Evidence of destruction and collapse of the buildings is often characterized by the presence of thick, burned layers; these layers are well-documented in the excavated areas of Rofalco. The discovery of clay sling bullets serves as additional evidence for the violent end of the fortress. These clay bullets have been discovered in both the destruction levels and also on the topsoil. The evidence for destruction, combined with the absence of pottery later than the first decades of the 3rd century BCE, connect the destruction of Rofalco to the triumph De Vulsiniensibus et Vulcientibus (tr. “over the people of Vulsinii and Vulcii”) by the Roman consul Tiberius Coruncanius in 280 BCE (Fasti Triumphales, 280/279, Feb. 1st). The defeat of Vulci had grave consequences for the urban centers of the territory. In fact, evidence of destruction and fire, quite similar to those found in Rofalco, were found also in Sovana, Saturnia, Ghiaccio Forte, and Doganella.

=== Modern period ===
After the violent destruction of the Etruscan settlement, Rofalco does not appear to have been occupied or visited in the later periods. The next occupation dates to the Renaissance and was largely for agricultural purposes. The discovery of a few fragments of majolica and glazed pottery, iron tools, as well as traces of plowing, and stone clearances belonging to the Renaissance are observed in several areas scattered over the site.

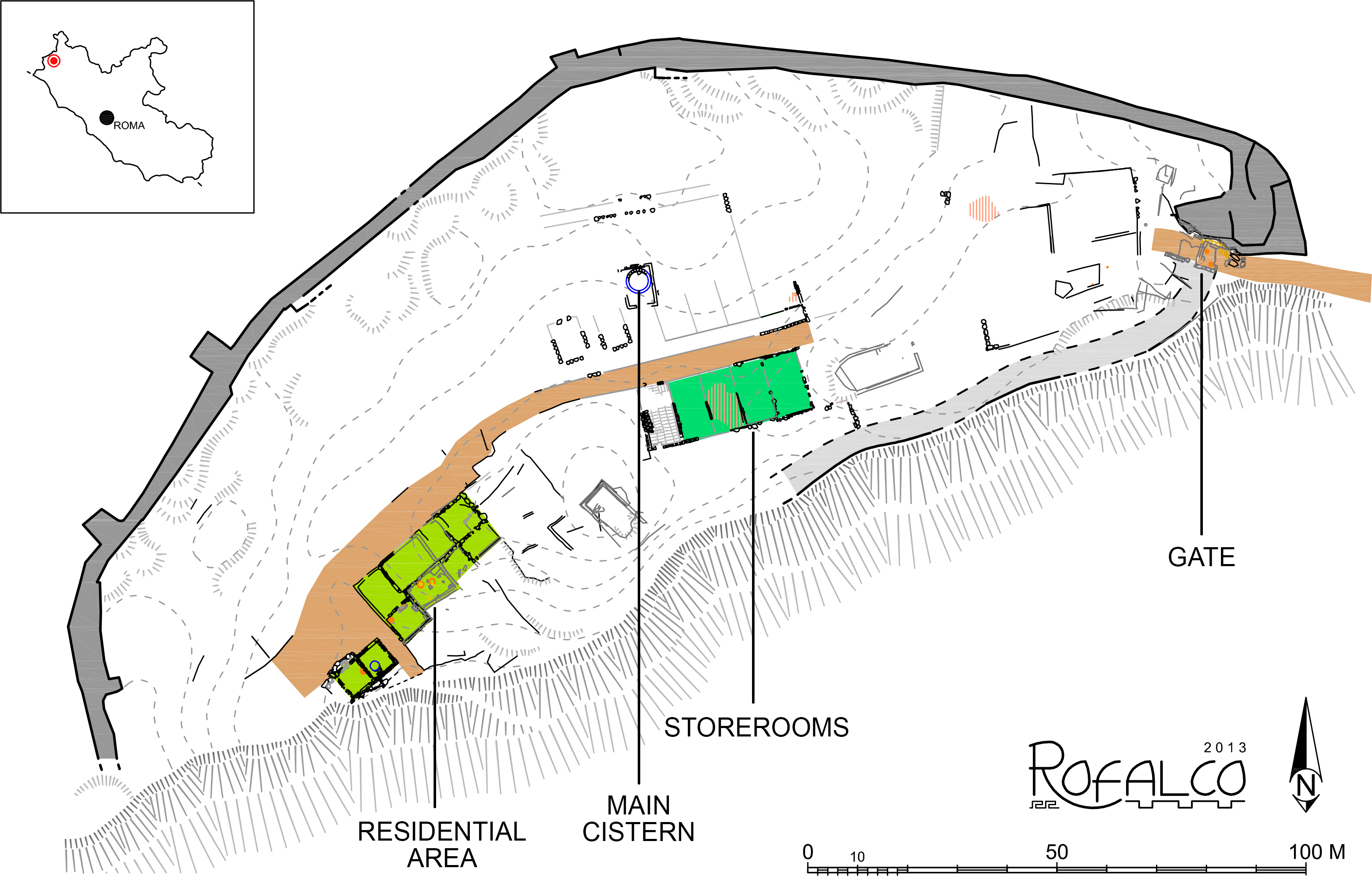
Plan of Rofalco
