= Quintus Marcius Philippus (consul 281 BC) =

Quintus Marcius Philippus (Quintus Marcius Q. f. Q. n. Philippus) was a Roman consul in 281 BC.

His father was probably Quintus Marcius Tremulus, consul in 306 and 288 BC. Instead of the cognomen Tremulus he took Philippus, which was further inherited by his descendants.

He was elected consul together with Lucius Aemilius Barbula. His victory over the Etruscans earned him a triumph on April 1 of that year. In 269 BC he was elected censor together with his co-consul Lucius Aemilius Barbula. In 263 BC he was magister equitum to the dictator Gnaeus Fulvius Maximus Centumalus.

Preceded by Gaius Fabricius Luscinus and Quintus Aemilius Papus	Consul of the Roman Republic with Lucius Aemilius Barbula; 281 BC	Succeeded by Publius Valerius Laevinus and Tiberius Coruncanius
