= Megacles of Epirus =

Officer of Pyrrhus of Epirus

Megacles (Ancient Greek: Μεγακλῆς, romanized: Megaklēs; d. July 280 BC) was an officer in the service of Pyrrhus of Epirus, who accompanied that monarch on his expedition to Italy in 280 BC. He is mentioned as accompanying Pyrrhus when he reconnoitred the Roman camp previous to the battle of Heraclea, and in that action was the means of saving the king's life by exchanging armour with him, and thus directing the efforts of the assailants upon himself instead of Pyrrhus. He fell a victim to his devotion, being slain by a Roman named Dexous as per Plutarch.
