= List of ancient treaties =

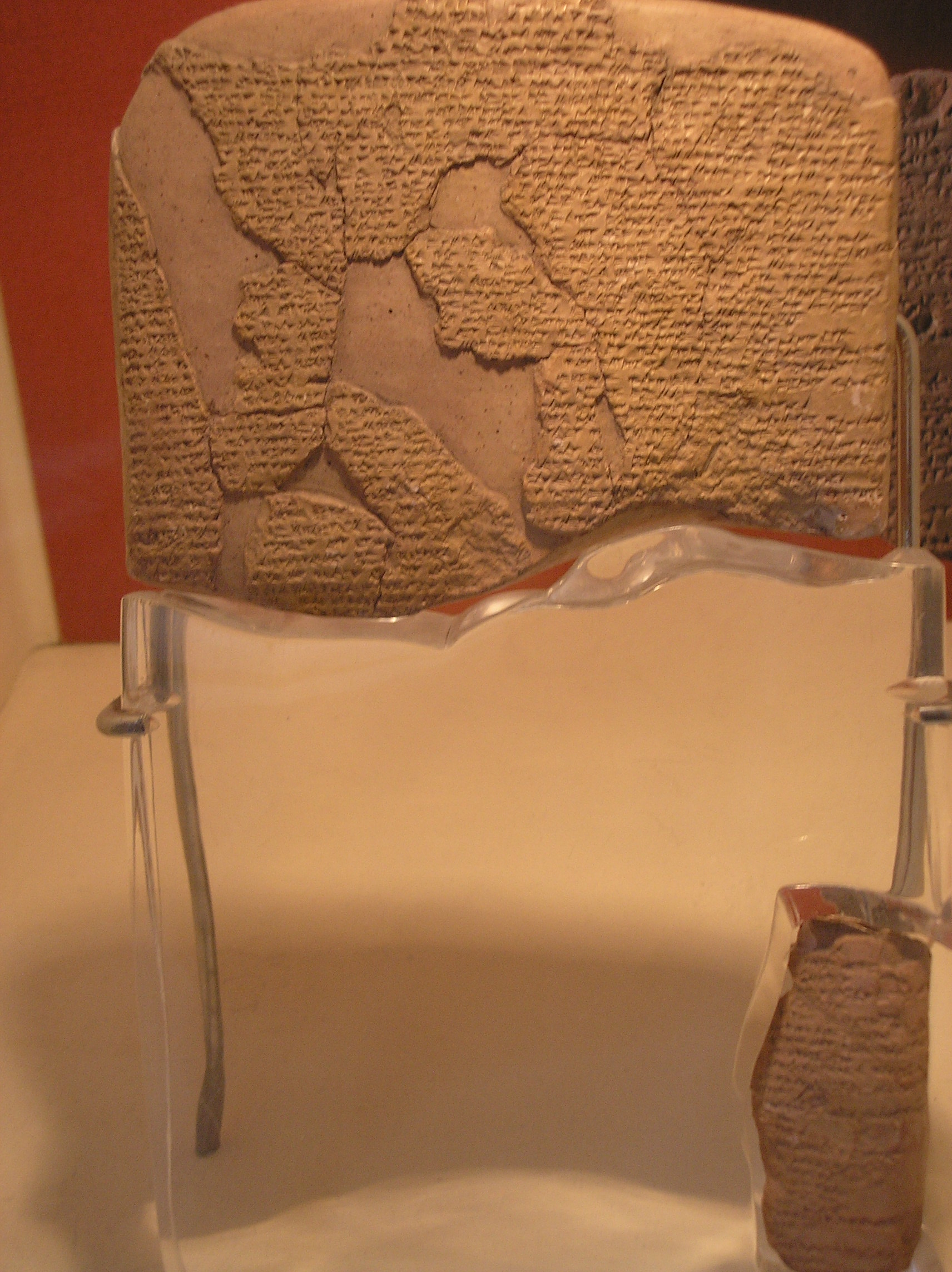
Tablet of the first known treaty in history, Treaty of Kadesh, at the Istanbul Archaeology Museum.

The following is a list of ancient peace treaties:

- The Treaty of Kadesh (1259 BC) - peace treaty made between Ancient Egyptians, under Rameses II and the Hittites, under Ḫattušili III, concluded several years after the Battle of Kadesh (1274 BC) in which Rameses II fought with Muwatalli II.
- The Peace of Callias (449 BC) - between the Delian League (led by Athens) and Persia, ending the Persian Wars.
- The Treaty of the Thirty Years Peace (446 BC/445 BC) - treaty between the ancient Greek city-states Athens and Sparta
- Peace of Antalcidas (387 BC) - King Artaxerxes II that ended the Corinthian War in ancient Greece.
- Peace of Philocrates (346 BC)

== See also ==
- List of treaties
- List of wars extended by diplomatic irregularity
- Treaties between Rome and Carthage
