= Lucius Aemilius Barbula =

Roman consul in 281 BC who campaigned against Pyrrhus

Lucius Aemilius Barbula was a patrician Roman consul in 281 BC. His colleague was Quintus Marcius Philippus. During his consulship he was given a command against the Samnites but spent most of the year fighting the Tarentines in the then-incipient Pyrrhic War.

In 281 BC as consul he intended to campaign against the Samnites, but after the Roman envoy Lucius Postumius Megellus was rebuffed from the Italiote city of Tarentum – the Tarentines refused to negotiate over the return of Roman prisoners whom they had taken in a march the previous year against the Roman ally Thurii or withdraw their forces from Thurii – the Romans declared war. The Senate ordered Aemilius to suspend his campaign against the Samnites and refocus his efforts against the Tarentines. Entering Tarentine territory, raiding the countryside, and sacking local towns, he reiterated Roman demands without changes and released pro-Roman Tarentines in an effort to influence Tarentine opinion. With a Roman army on their doorstep and local Greek cities to defecting to the Romans the Tarentines called for aid from Pyrrhus of Epirus, initiating the Pyrrhic War. When Pyrrhus' vanguard arrived in Tarentum and expelled the pro-peace Tarentine faction, Aemilius' diplomatic strategy seems to have collapsed: he withdrew to Venusia, but not before an abortive ambush by the Tarentines which he forestalled by use of Tarentine captives as human shields.

The next year, 280 BC, saw his command in southern Italy prorogued pro consule. His efforts in Samnium were successful in preventing them from sending aid to support Pyrrhus at the Battle of Heraclea. The successes there were sufficient for a triumph – in the Fasti Triumphales over the Tarentines, Samnites, and Sallentines – which he celebrated in July (Quintilis) of that year. He was later elected Roman censor starting in 269 BC.

Aemilius was son of Quintus Aemilius Barbula, consul of 317 and 311. His son Marcus Aemilius Barbula became consul in 230, the third and last successive generations of consuls from this branch.

== Sources ==
- Broughton, Thomas Robert Shannon (1951). The magistrates of the Roman republic. Vol. 1. New York: American Philological Association.
- Broughton, Thomas Robert Shannon (1952). The magistrates of the Roman republic. Vol. 2. New York: American Philological Association.
- Kent, Patrick Alan (2020). A history of the Pyrrhic War. Routledge. ISBN 978-1-138-54382-9.

Preceded by Gaius Fabricius Luscinus and Quintus Aemilius Papus	Consul of the Roman Republic with Quintus Marcius Philippus; 281 BC	Succeeded by Publius Valerius Laevinus and Tiberius Coruncanius
