= Publius Sulpicius Saverrio (consul 279 BC) =

Roman consul in 279 BC who fought Pyrrhus of Epirus

Publius Sulpicius Saverrio was Roman consul in 279 BC. A patrician, his consular colleague was Publius Decius Mus. Assigned with Mus to the Pyrrhic War in southern Italy, the two consuls fought a joint battle against Pyrrhus at Asculum. With around 40,000 men against Pyrrhus' similarly sized forces, the consuls were defeated after two days of fighting. Via Plutarch, Pyrrhus reported Roman losses of around 6,000 and Epirote losses of 3,505: he then famously claimed that another such victory would ruin him, giving rise to the modern phrase "Pyrrhic victory".

Saverrio's father was the consul of the same name in 304 BC. He was also the grandfather of Publius Sulpicius Galba Maximus, consul in 211 and 200 BC.

Magistrates of the Roman Republic reports no known magistracy other than the consulship of 279 BC.

== Bibliography ==
- Broughton, Thomas Robert Shannon (1951). The magistrates of the Roman republic. Vol. 1. New York: American Philological Association.
- Broughton, Thomas Robert Shannon (1952). The magistrates of the Roman republic. Vol. 2. New York: American Philological Association.
- Kent, Patrick Alan (2020). A history of the Pyrrhic War. Routledge. ISBN 978-1-138-54382-9.
- Zmeskal, Klaus (2009). Adfinitas (in German). Vol. 1. Passau: Verlag Karl Stutz. ISBN 978-3-88849-304-1.

Political offices
| Preceded by Publius Valerius Laevinus and Tiberius Coruncanius | Consul of the Roman Republic with Publius Decius Mus; 279 BC | Succeeded by Gaius Fabricius Luscinus and Quintus Aemilius Papus |
