= Battle of Heraclea =

Battle in 280 BC between the Romans and Pyrrhus of Epirus

Coordinates: 40°13′12″N 16°40′11″E

- Part of the Pyrrhic War
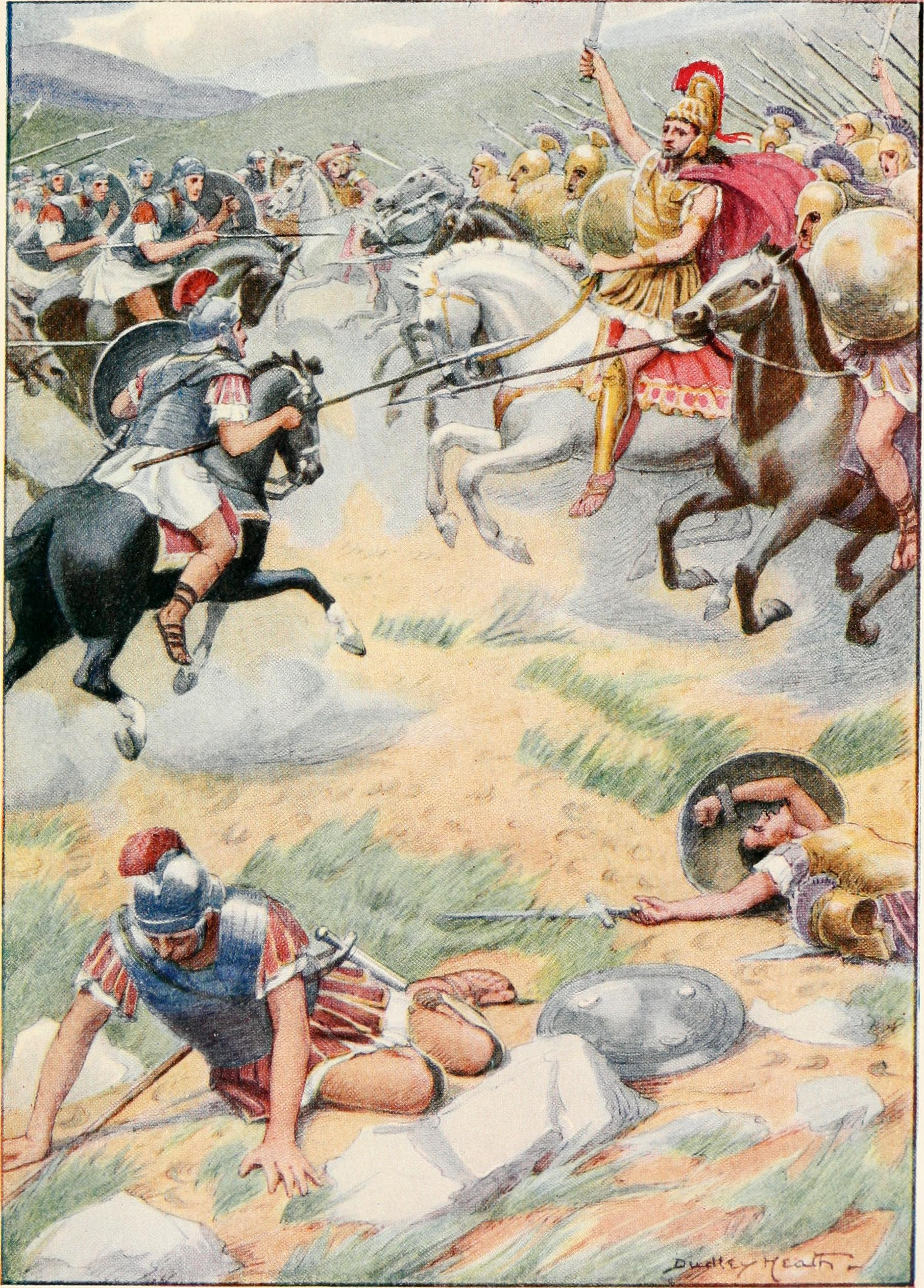
- Illustration of the battle from the book "The story of Rome, from the earliest times to the death of Augustus, told to boys and girls" (1912)
Date	July 280 BC
Location	Heraclea, Lucania, southern Italy
Result	Epiruite victory

Belligerents
Epiru	Roman Republic

Commanders and leaders
Pyrrhus of Epiru	Publius Valerius Laevinus

Strength
~35,000 men: ~4,000 cavalry; ~28,500 Infantry; 2,000 Archers; 500 slingers; 20 war elephants	at least 42,400 men: at least 40,000 infantry; at least 2,400 cavalry

Casualties and losses
Plutarch and Hieronymus: 4,000; Dionysius of Halicarnassus: 13,000	Plutarch and Hieronymus: 7,000 dead and 1800 Romans captured Dionysius of Halicarnassus: 15,000 dead

The Battle of Heraclea took place in 280 BC between the Romans under the command of consul Publius Valerius Laevinus, and the combined forces of Greeks from Epirus, Tarentum, Thurii, Metapontum, and Heraclea under the command of Pyrrhus, king of Epirus. Although the battle was a victory for the Greeks, they incurred severe losses.

== Background ==
Tarentum was a Greek colony, part of Magna Graecia. The members of the leading faction in Tarentum, the democrats under Philocharis or Ainesias, were against Rome, because they knew that if the Romans entered Tarentum the Greeks would lose their independence. The Greeks in Tarentum had grown afraid of Roman expansion after the Third Samnite War. After the surrender of the Samnites in 290 BC, the Romans founded many colonies in Apulia and Lucania, the most important of which was Venusia. In 282 BC, after a battle against the Samnites, Lucanians, Bruttians and Thurii, Roman troops entered the Italian Greek colonies of Croton, Lokroi, and Rhegium. Democrats from Tarentum knew that as soon as Rome finished its war with the Gauls, Lucanians, Etruscans, Samnites, and Bruttians, they would enter Tarentum. Another event that concerned the Tarentines was that the aristocratic faction of Thurii that had taken power had invited a Roman garrison into their city; the Tarentines, who had been the referents of all the Magna Graecia colonies, were deeply worried about this fact.

The second faction in Tarentum were the aristocrats, led by Agis, who did not oppose surrendering to Rome, as it would lead to the return of the aristocratic faction to power. The aristocrats, however, could not surrender directly and become unpopular with the population. In the autumn of 282 BC, Tarentum celebrated their festival of Dionysus; while in their theatre in front of sea, they saw ten Roman ships, with soldiers and supplies for the Roman garrison of Thurii, entering the Gulf of Taranto. According to Kęciek, the Tarentine aristocracy asked the Roman commanders Publius Cornelius and Lucius Valerius to arrest and execute the democrats and their followers, which would allow the aristocrats to surrender. The Tarentines were angry, because the Romans had signed an agreement not to sail into the Gulf of Taranto, and they prepared their navy to attack the Roman ships. A few of the ships were sunk, and one was captured.

The Tarentines knew that they had few chances of victory against Rome. They decided to call for help from Pyrrhus, King of Epirus. The army and fleet of Tarentum moved to Thurii and helped the democrats there exile the aristocrats. The Roman garrison placed in Thurii withdrew.

The Romans sent a diplomatic mission to settle the matter and take back the prisoners but the negotiations ended abruptly, so Rome declared war on Tarentum. In 281 BC, Roman legions under the command of Lucius Aemilius Barbula entered Tarentum and plundered it. Tarentum, with Samnite and Salentine reinforcements, then lost a battle against the Romans. After the battle the Greeks chose Agis to sign a truce and begin diplomatic talks. These talks were also broken off when 3,000 soldiers from Epirus under the command of Milon entered the town. The Roman consul withdrew and suffered losses from attacks by the Greek ships.

Pyrrhus decided to help Tarentum because he was in debt to them — they had earlier helped him conquer the island of Corcyra. He also believed that he could count on help from the Samnites, Lucanians, Etruscans, Umbrians, and Bruttians, and some Illyrian tribes, all peoples with a history of conflict with Rome. His ultimate goal was to re-conquer Macedon he had lost in 285 BC, but did not have enough money to recruit soldiers. He planned to help Tarentum, then go to Sicily and attack Carthage. After winning a war against Carthage and capturing south Italy he would have enough money to organise a strong army and capture Macedon.

== Preparation ==
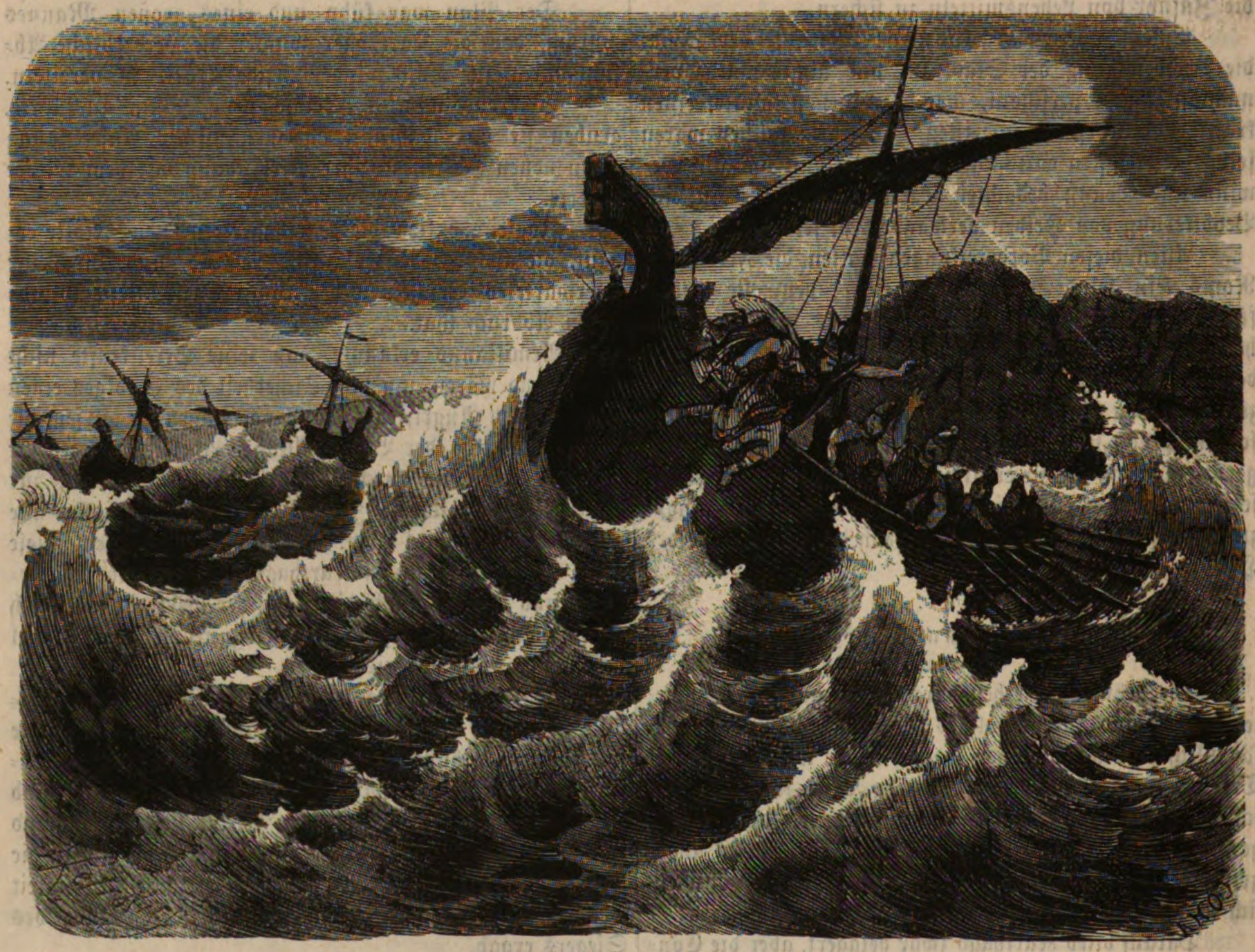
"Pyrrhus jumps to the sea to swim to the shore, 280 BC", engraving by Ladislav Eugen Petrovits (ca. 1872)

Before he left Epirus, Pyrrhus formed an alliance and borrowed Macedonian soldiers and money from the pretender to the Macedonian throne, Ptolemy Keraunos. His long-time friend and ally Ptolemy II Philadelphus, king of Ptolemaic Egypt, also promised to send 9,000 soldiers and 50 war elephants. He also recruited cavalry from Thessaly and archers and slingers from Rhodes — as their rulers wanted to avoid a war with Epirus. In the spring of 280 BC Pyrrhus landed without losses in Italy.

After hearing of Pyrrhus' arrival in Italy the Romans mobilized eight legions with auxiliaries, totalling about 80,000 soldiers. They divided it into four armies:

- One army under the command of Barbula, with orders to distract the Samnites and Lucanians so they could not join Pyrrhus' army. They were placed in Venusia.
- A second army left behind to secure Rome.
- A third army under the command of consul Tiberius Coruncanius marched against Etruscans, to avoid an alliance between them and Pyrrhus.
- A fourth army under the command of Publius Valerius Laevinus marched to Tarentum. They also plundered Lucania.

Publius Laevinus moved towards Heraclea, a city founded by the Tarentines, with the intention of cutting Pyrrhus off from the Greek colonies of Calabria, thus avoiding their uprising against Rome.

== Battle ==
Pyrrhus did not march against the Romans while he was waiting for his allies' reinforcements. When he understood that reinforcements were not coming, he decided to fight the Romans on a plain near the river Siris (modern Sinni), between Pandosia and Heraclea. Pyrrhus took up position there and waited. Before the fight he sent diplomats to the Roman consul, proposing that he could arbitrate the conflicts between Rome and the population of southern Italy. He asserted that his allies recognised him as a judge and demanded the same recognition from the Romans. The Romans denied his request, and entered the plain on the right of the Siris river, where they set up camp.

It is unknown how many troops Pyrrhus had left in Tarentum, it is estimated he had about 25–35,000 troops with him at Heraclea. He took up position on the left bank of the Siris, hoping that the Romans would have difficulty crossing the river, which would allow him more time to prepare his attack. He set up some light infantry units near the river to let him know when the Romans began to cross, and planned first to attack them with his cavalry and elephants. Valerius Laevinus had about 42,000 soldiers under his command, including cavalry, velites, and spearmen. It would be the first time in history that two very different juggernauts of war clashed: the Roman Legion and the Macedonian Phalanx.

At dawn, the Romans started to cross the river Siris. On the flanks the Roman cavalry attacked the scouts and light infantry, who were forced to flee.

When Pyrrhus learned that the Romans had begun crossing the river, he led his Macedonian and Thessalian cavalry to attack the Roman cavalry. His infantry, with peltasts and archers and heavy infantry, began their march as well. The Epirote cavalry successfully disrupted the Roman battle formation and then withdrew. Pyrrhus' peltasts, slingers, and archers began to shoot and his sarissa-wielding phalanxes began to attack. The infantry line was near equal to the Romans' in length as, although Pyrrhus had a small advantage in number, the phalanx was by design deeper than the legion.

The phalanxes made seven attacks, but failed to pierce the legion. It had met a foe that was stronger than any it had ever encountered. The Romans made seven attacks, yet they could not break the phalanx, and the battle hung in the air. At one point, the battle became so pitched that Pyrrhus—realizing that if he were to fall in combat, his soldiers would lose heart and run—switched armor with one of his bodyguards. This bodyguard was subsequently killed, and word spread through the ranks that Pyrrhus had fallen. His force began to waver, and the Romans gave a thunderous cheer at the turn of events. Grasping the magnitude of the situation, Pyrrhus rode forward, bare-headed, along the lines of his men to show he was still living. This show of bravery strengthened their resolve. A massive cheer went up from the Greek line, and the battle raged on.

Unable to make any significant gains in action, Pyrrhus deployed his war elephants, held in reserve until now. The Roman cavalry was threatening his flank too strongly. Aghast at the sight of these strange creatures none had seen before, the horses galloped away and threw the Roman legion into rout. (The Romans subsequently called elephants Lūca bōs, 'Lucanian ox', after the location of this first encounter.). Pyrrhus then launched his Thessalian cavalry among the disorganized legions, which completed the Romans' defeat. The Romans fell back across the river and Pyrrhus held the field.

In the opinion of Dionysius, the Romans lost 15,000 soldiers and had thousands taken prisoner; Hieronymus states 7,000 dead and 1,800 prisoners. Dionysius totalled Pyrrhus' losses at around 13,000 soldiers, 4,000 according to Hieronymus. Either way, this could be considered a great albeit costly victory against Rome.

== Aftermath ==
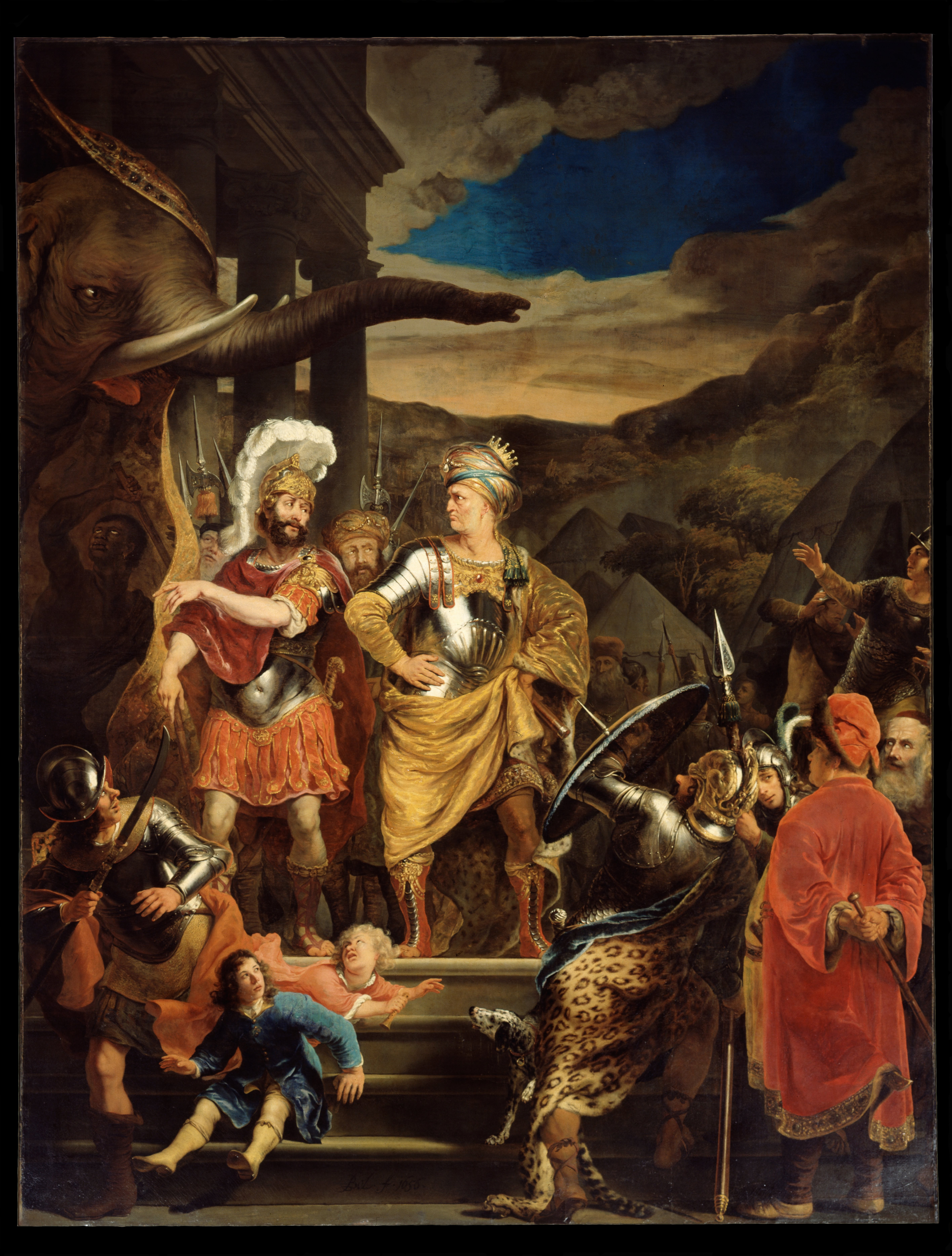
Gaius Fabricius Luscinus negotiating with Pyrrhus after Heraclea (Ferdinand Bol, 1656 painting)

After the battle, reinforcements from south Italy joined Pyrrhus. The Greeks of Rhegium who wanted to join him were massacred by Roman soldiers under the command of Decius Vibelius, who was proclaimed ruler of the town. Pyrrhus then began to march towards Rome. He captured many small towns in Campania, and his forces plundered Latium. His march was stopped in Anagni, two days from Rome, when he met the other Roman consular army under Tiberius Coruncanius. Pyrrhus was afraid that he did not have enough soldiers to fight, and knew Laevinus and Barbula were probably marching behind him. Instead he withdrew and the Romans did not follow him.

== See also ==
- Megacles of Epirus
- Battle of Asculum
