= Tiberius Coruncanius =

Roman consul in 280 and first plebeian pontifex maximus

Tiberius Coruncanius (died c. 243 BC) was consul of the Roman Republic in 280 BC. During his consulship he led Roman forces north against the Etruscan Volsinii and Vulci, celebrating triumphs over them, while his colleague Publius Valerius Laevinus fought Pyrrhus of Epirus. Long after his consulship, some time between 255 and 252 BC he was made pontifex maximus, the first plebeian to hold the title. He may also have been the first teacher of Roman law to offer public instruction.

== Political biography ==
Coruncanius, of plebeian descent, is believed to have hailed from Tusculum.

He was first elected consul in 280 BC, with Publius Valerius Laevinus as his colleague. Coruncanius then led an expedition into Etruria against the Etruscans, continuing conflicts which Rome had been fighting prior to the then-incipient Pyrrhic War. His colleague, Laevinius, was assigned southern Italy where he would be defeated by Pyrrhus at the Battle of Heraclea. After Coruncanius concluded his northern campaign successfully, he celebrated a triumph over the Etruscans of Volsinii and Vulci. He and his forces were then dispatched south to join in the effort against Pyrrhus.

In 246 BC he was made dictator for the purpose of holding elections (comitiorum habendorum causa) since both consuls were away on campaign during the First Punic War against Carthage. He appointed Marcus Fulvius Flaccus as his magister equitum.

Some time between 255 and 252 BC he was elected pontifex maximus, the first plebeian to hold the title. He died c. 243 BC and was succeeded in the high pontificate by Lucius Caecilius Metellus, another plebeian.

== Juristic career ==
According to excerpts of the jurist Sextus Pomponius preserved in the Justinianic Digest, prior to Coruncanius' arrival to the law courts, there were none who publicly professed law (ante Ti. Coruncanium publice professum neminem traditur). In consequence, Pomponius claims Coruncanius was the first to have deviated from his predecessors who kept their fellow citizens ignorant of the law or only shared legal knowledge in private among their friends. Indeed, unlike previous pontifices he discussed cases and procedure in public to anyone who showed interest rather than doing so in private only among the pontifical college.

None of Coruncanius writings survived even to the time of Pomponius, though Pomponius notes his legal opinions were numerous and influential.

== Bibliography ==
- Broughton, Thomas Robert Shannon (1951). The magistrates of the Roman republic. Vol. 1. New York: American Philological Association.
- Broughton, Thomas Robert Shannon (1952). The magistrates of the Roman republic. Vol. 2. New York: American Philological Association.
- Derow, Peter Sidney (2012). "Coruncanius, Tiberius". In Hornblower, Simon; et al. (eds.). The Oxford classical dictionary (4th ed.). Oxford University Press. doi:10.1093/acrefore/9780199381135.013.1891. ISBN 978-0-19-938113-5. OCLC 959667246.
- Kent, Patrick Alan (2020). A history of the Pyrrhic War. Routledge. ISBN 978-1-138-54382-9.
- Münzer, Fredrich; Jörs, Paul (1901). "Coruncanius 3" . Realencyclopädie der classischen Altertumswissenschaft (in German). Vol. IV, 2. Stuttgart: Butcher. cols. 1663–1665 – via Wikisource.
- Watson, Paul (1998). The Digest of Justinian. Vol. 1 (Revised ed.). Philadelphia: University of Pennsylvania Press. ISBN 978-0-8122-2033-9.
- Wilson, Mark B (2021). Dictator: the evolution of the Roman dictatorship. Ann Arbor: University of Michigan Press. ISBN 978-0-472-13266-9.

Political offices
Preceded by Lucius Aemilius Barbula and Quintus Marcius Philippus	Consul of the Roman Republic with Publius Valerius Laevinus; 280 BC	Succeeded by Publius Sulpicius Saverrio and Publius Decius Mus
Religious titles
Preceded by unknown	Pontifex Maximus of the Roman Republic; 254 BC – 241 BC	Succeeded by Lucius Caecilius Metellus
