= Publius Decius Mus (consul 279 BC) =

Roman consul in 279 BC

Publius Decius Mus was a Roman consul in 279 BC and a suffect consul in 265.

A plebeian, his colleague in his ordinary consulship of 279 was the patrician Publius Sulpicius Saverrio. The two consuls fought a joint campaign against Pyrrhus of Epirus as part of the Pyrrhic War. They engaged Pyrrhus near Asculum with about equal forces of 40,000 men and in the resulting battle were defeated. Pyrrhus' losses, however, were large and famously exclaimed that another such victory would spell the end of his campaign, giving rise to the modern phrase "Pyrrhic victory".

Many of the ancient sources report that Decius Mus was planning on enacting a ritual called devotio which involved his consecrating himself and the enemy army to underworld gods, giving up his life in battle, in exchange for victory. Mus' grandfather and father are said to have both sacrificed themselves in such rituals while consul, respectively securing Roman victory at the battles of Veseris in 340 BC and Sentinum in 295 BC.

Sources differ as to Mus' fate: Cicero vaguely reports he was killed with no link to devotio, but Cassius Dio and Zonaras both report he survived, albeit frustrated in his efforts to conduct the devotio. No devotio appears in the most complete narrative of the battle, that by Dionysius of Halicarnassus, which suggests that claims of the ritual's performance at Asculum are spurious embellishments. Patrick Kent, in A History of the Pyrrhic War, concludes that "the devotio of Decius in 279 is a later fabrication modelled on earlier episodes and then attached to Ausculum to [add] to the spectacular nature of the battle's narrative... it is unlikely that any such ritual was successfully completed at Ausculum or even attempted".

A person with the same name, who has often been identified as the same person as the consul of 279 BC, was suffect consul in 265. In this suffect consulship, Mus crushed a revolt of slaves at Volsinii in Etruria. No other magistracies are reported in Magistrates of the Roman Republic.

== Bibliography ==
- Broughton, Thomas Robert Shannon (1951). The magistrates of the Roman republic. Vol. 1. New York: American Philological Association.
- Broughton, Thomas Robert Shannon (1952). The magistrates of the Roman republic. Vol. 2. New York: American Philological Association.
- Kent, Patrick Alan (2020). A history of the Pyrrhic War. Routledge. ISBN 978-1-138-54382-9.

Political offices
Preceded by Publius Valerius Laevinus and Tiberius Coruncanius	Consul of the Roman Republic with Publius Sulpicius Saverrio; 279 BC	Succeeded by Gaius Fabricius Luscinus and Quintus Aemilius Papus
