= Publius Valerius Laevinus =

3rd-century BC Roman military commander

Publius Valerius Laevinus was Roman consul in 280 BC. A patrician, his plebeian colleague was Tiberius Coruncanius. During his consulship he was assigned to southern Italy to conduct the Pyrrhic War against Pyrrhus of Epirus.

Moving south, he fortified Roman lines of communication in southern Italy by garrisoning hostile Lucania with allied troops. He also Pyrrhus' attempts to insert himself as arbitrator of Rome's dispute with the Italiote city of Tarentum. In the summer, Laevinus engaged Pyrrhus at Heraclea with both generals commanding roughly 20,000 men. The resulting battle, however, was a Roman defeat which forced Laevinus to withdraw northwards across the Apennines into Campania. Reinforced with two freshly raised legions, he was able to deter Pyrrhus' pursuit and with the Epirotes' lack of siege equipment force them to withdraw south.

Laevinus' failure at Heraclea was derided in the senate. Plutarch's Life of Pyrrhus records Gaius Fabricius Luscinus inveighing against Laevinus "declar[ing] that it was not the Epirotes who had conquered the Romans, but Pyrrhus who had conquered Laevinus... [and] that the Roman defeat was not due to their army, but to its general". The failure notwithstanding he remained in command as Rome conducted levies to reinforce its armies. Pyrrhus advanced north into Latium but, out of fear of being surrounded by Laevinus from the south and Coruncanius from the north, was forced to withdraw back to Tarentum with the winter. Laevinus, for his part, wintered at Saepinum.

His only known office is his consulship in 280. Space in the Capitoline Fasti may suggest election of a suffect consul, suggesting Laevinus died or abdicated. Laevinus was the son of Gaius Valerius Potitus, consul in 331 BC.

== Bibliography ==
- Broughton, Thomas Robert Shannon (1951). The magistrates of the Roman republic. Vol. 1. New York: American Philological Association.
- Broughton, Thomas Robert Shannon (1952). The magistrates of the Roman republic. Vol. 2. New York: American Philological Association.
- Kent, Patrick Alan (2020). A history of the Pyrrhic War. Routledge. ISBN 978-1-138-54382-9.

Political offices
Preceded by Lucius Aemilius Barbula and Quintus Marcius Philippus	Consul of the Roman Republic with Tiberius Coruncanius; 280 BC	Succeeded by Publius Sulpicius Saverrio and Publius Decius Mus
