= Battle of Arretium =

Battle during the Roman–Gallic wars (c.284 BC)

- Part of the Roman–Gallic wars
Date	284 BC
Location	Arretium (modern Arezzo), Tuscany, Italy 43°27′47″N 11°53′00″E
Result	Senone victory

Belligerents
Senones	Roman Republic

Commanders and leaders
Possibly Britomaris (uncertain)	Lucius Caecilius Metellus Denter †

Strength
Unknown	Unknown

Casualties and losses
Unknown	13,000 killed
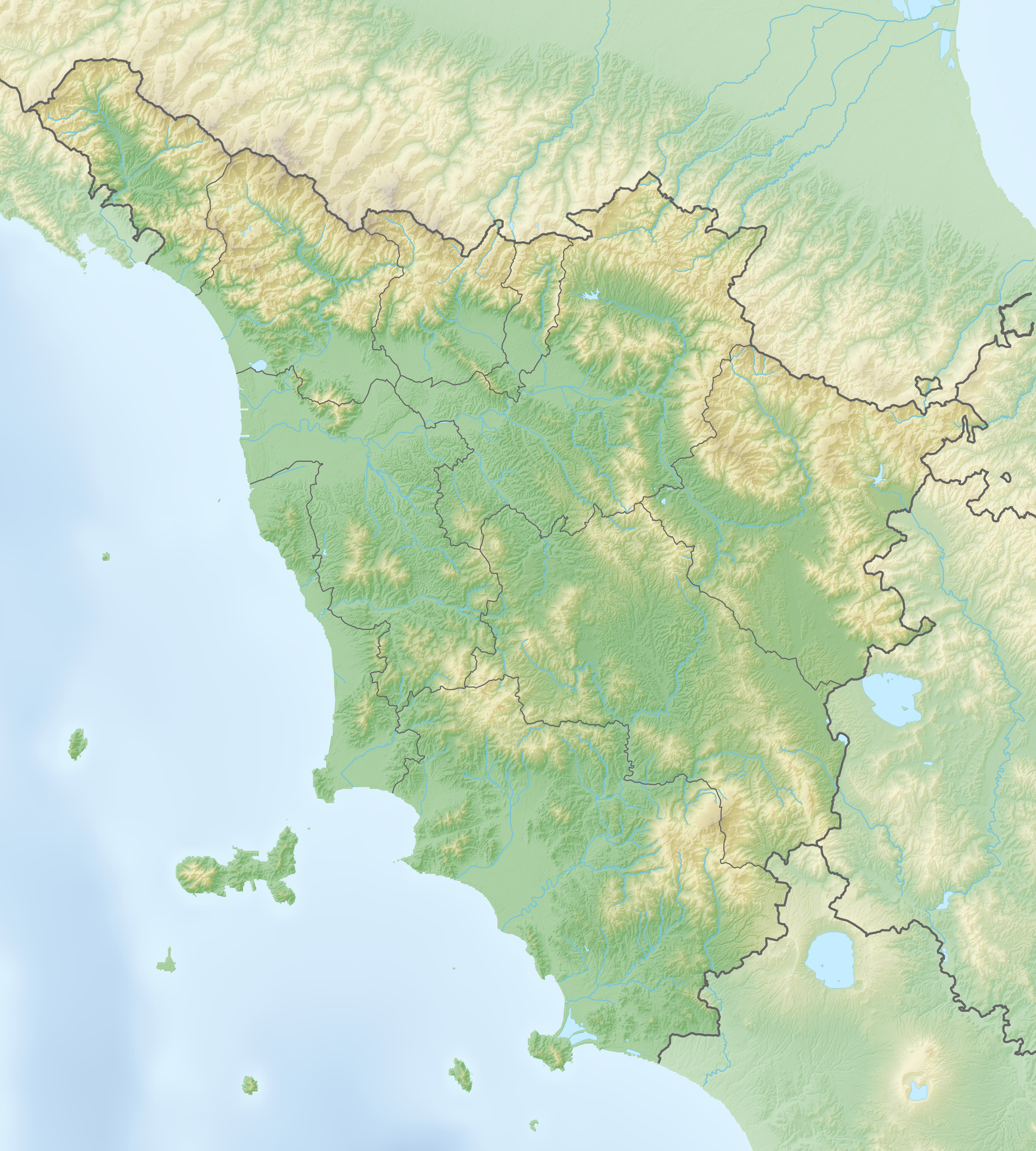
- Location within Tuscany Battle of Arretium (Italy) Battle of Arretium (Europe)

The Battle of Arretium, which was probably fought in 284 BC, is a poorly documented event in the history of the Roman Republic because it occurred in a period for which some of the books of the History of Rome by Livy, the most thorough ancient historian for early Rome, have been lost. The battle is only explicitly referred to in a text by Polybius, the ancient Greek historian, which does not give much detail and puts it in the context of other events. A text by Appian talks about these events, but does not make any explicit reference to the Battle of Arretium. It was fought between the Romans and the Gauls of northern Italy, who may have been from the Senone tribe.

According to Polybius, unspecified Gauls besieged the city of Arretium (Arezzo, in northeastern Tuscany) and defeated a Roman force which had come to the aid of the city. Their commander, the praetor Lucius Caecilius Metellus Denter, died in the battle. This would place the battle in 283 BC because Denter was a consul in 284 BC.

In Polybius’ account, Denter was replaced by Manius Curius Dentatus after the battle. Dentatus sent envoys to negotiate the release of Roman hostages, but the envoys were killed. The Romans marched on Gallia Cisalpina (Gaul this side of the Alps from the Roman geographical viewpoint) which was the name the Romans gave the area of the Gauls of northern Italy (as opposed to Gallia Transalpina, Gaul the other side of the Alps, which referred to what is now southern France). They were met by the Senones, who were defeated in a pitched battle. It can be assumed that this clash with the Senones occurred in the ager Gallicus (the name the Romans gave to the area which had been conquered by the Senones), on the Adriatic coast (in modern Marche) as Polybius wrote that "the Romans invaded the territory of the Senones, killed most of them and drove the rest out of the country and founded the colony of Sena Gallia (Senigallia)". Polybius did not specify who led this Roman campaign. According to Polybius:

Hereupon the Boii, seeing the Senones expelled from their territory, and fearing a like fate for themselves and their own land, implored the aid of the Etruscans and marched out in full force. The united armies gave battle to the Romans near Lake Vadimon, and in this battle most of the Etruscans were cut to pieces while only quite a few of the Boii escaped.

According to Polybius, the next year the Boii and the Etruscans engaged the Romans in battle again and "were utterly defeated and it was only now that their courage at length gave way and that they sent an embassy to sue for terms and made a treaty with the Romans."

Appian also wrote about the wars between Rome and the Gauls in Italy and Gaul and Julius Caesar's conquest of Gaul (Gallic Wars 1, 2, and 3 of his Roman History). However, his work has survived only in fragments which are often short and sometimes do not shed enough light on events. He wrote about events in 283 BC and mentioned a battle fought against the Romans by a Gallic and Etruscan force without mentioning where it was. This fragment concentrates on an incident which involved Roman ambassadors and Roman actions in the ager Gallicus.

According to Appian, the Romans sent their ambassadors specifically to the Senones and for a different reason. The Senones had provided mercenaries to forces which had fought against Rome despite the fact that they had a treaty with Rome. The Romans sent ambassadors to remonstrate against this. Appian wrote:

Britomaris, the Gaul, being incensed against them on account of his father, who had been killed by the Romans while fighting on the side of the Etruscans in this very war, slew the ambassadors [while they were still holding the herald’s staff].

He added some details which are probably fictitious and reflect prejudice towards barbarians. He wrote that Britomaris wore the envoys' official garments and "cut their bodies in small pieces and scattered them in the fields." Publius Cornelius Dolabella, (the consul for 283 BC) "while he was on the march, moved with great speed" to the ager Gallicus "by way of the Sabine country and Picenum" and laid it to waste. According to Appian:

He ravaged them all [the Senones] with fire and sword. He reduced the women and children to slavery, killed all the adult men without exception, devastated the country in every possible way, and made it uninhabitable for anybody else.

Appian added, "A little later the Senones (who were serving as mercenaries), having no longer any homes to return to, fell boldly upon the consul Domitius, and being defeated by him killed themselves in despair."

Appian does not link the killing of the ambassadors to the siege and battle at Arretium. He does not mention where the ambassadors met Britomaris either. The fact that Britomaris' father was killed by the Romans while fighting on the side of the Etruscans in the same war could suggest that this previous fighting was the Battle of Lake Vadimon, which involved a combined Etruscan and Gallic army (the Battle of Arretium only involved Gauls). The second battle mentioned by Polybius, in which the Etruscans and Gauls were defeated again and sued for peace, may well correspond with the second battle mentioned by Appian. However, while Polybius places this second battle against an Etrusco-Gallic force in the next year (284 BC), Appian claims that it was won by Gnaeus Domitius Calvinus Maximus, who was the other consul for 283 BC. Appian did not mention the Boii in the second battle. It does not seem that there is a reference to the Battle of Arretium as there is no mention of a siege, of a battle between Romans and Gauls only, or Roman prisoners, and the purpose of the Roman embassy was different. The lack of mention of where the battles were fought compounds the problem. With regards to when the Battle of Lake Vadimon and the devastation of the ager Gallicus occurred, there also may to be a discrepancy between the sequence of events presented by Polybius and the sequence which may be inferred from Appian's text.

Forsythe maintains that the Romans suffered a crushing defeat at the Battle of Arretium resulting in the death of the general, seven military tribunes and 13,000 Roman soldiers. He draws these figures from Augustine of Hippo and Orosius. However, these two authors wrote in the early fifth century AD, some 700 years after the battle. Both were clergymen and Christian writers. The books of both authors in which they mentioned this battle were apologetic of Christianity and were aimed at showing that the world had improved with Christianity and that many disasters had happened in the pagan days. Orosius also collaborated with Augustine on the latter's book (The City of God) and his text is remarkably similar to that of Augustine's. Both authors also wrote of a coalition of Lucanians, Bruttians, Samnites, Etruscans, and Senones. This never happened; there had been a coalition of Samnites, Etruscans, Umbrians and Senones (but not Lucanians or Bruttians) which fought Rome at the Battle of Sentinum 11 or 12 years earlier (in 295 BC) during the Third Samnite War (298–290 BC). Both this and the purpose of their writing may cast doubts on their accuracy. Moreover, although the consuls for the year are mentioned, Arretium is not.

According to Augustine:

[A]t one time, the Lucanians, Brutians, Samnites, Tuscans, and Senonian Gauls conspired against Rome, and first slew her ambassadors, then overthrew an army under the prætor, putting to the sword 13,000 men, besides the commander and seven tribunes[.]"

Orosius wrote:

[D]uring the consulship of Dolabella and Domitius, the Lucanians, Bruttians, and Samnites made an alliance with the Etruscans and Senonian Gauls, who were attempting to renew war against the Romans. The Romans sent ambassadors to dissuade the Gauls from joining this alliance, but the Gauls killed the envoys. The praetor Caecilius was sent with an army to avenge their murder and to crush the uprising of the enemy. He was, however, overwhelmed by the Etruscans and Gauls, and perished. Seven military tribunes were also slain in that battle, many nobles were killed, and thirty thousand soldiers likewise met their death.

== Bibliography ==
- Appian's Roman History I: v. 1 (Loeb Classical Library) Loeb (1989) ISBN 978-0674990043
- Forsythe, G., A Critical History of Early Rome: From Prehistory to the First Punic War, University of California Press (2006) ISBN 978-0520249912
- Orosius: Seven Books of History Against the Pagans, Liverpool University Press (2010) ISBN 978-1846312397
- Polybius, The Histories (Oxford World's Classics) OUP Oxford (2010) ISBN 978-0199534708
- St Augustine, The City of God, Hendrickson (2009) ISBN 978-1598563375
