= Timeline of Roman history =

This is a timeline of Roman history, comprising important legal and territorial changes and political events in the Roman Kingdom and Republic and the Roman and Byzantine Empires. To read about the background of these events, see Ancient Rome and History of the Byzantine Empire.

Events and persons of the Kingdom of Rome (and to some degree of the early Republic) are legendary, and their accounts are considered to have varying degrees of veracity.

Following tradition, this timeline marks the deposition of Romulus Augustulus and the Fall of Constantinople as the end of Rome in the west and east, respectively. See Third Rome for a discussion of claimants to the succession of Rome.

== 8th and 7th centuries BC ==
Year	Date	Event
754 BC		Battle of Alba Longa. King of Alba Longa, Amulius, who had previously usurped power is defeated and killed along with his sons by his Brother Numitor, and great-nephew Romulus, who led a sizable warband.
753 BC	21 April	Rome was founded. According to Roman legend, Romulus was the founder and first King of Rome, establishing the Roman Kingdom.
752 BC		Romulus, first king of Rome, celebrates the first Roman triumph after his victory over the Caeninenses, following the Rape of the Sabine Women. He celebrates a further triumph later in the year over the Antemnates.
752 BC		Rome's first colonies were established.
715 BC		Numa Pompilius became the second King of Rome.
673 BC		Tullus Hostilius became the third King of Rome.
667 BC		Byzantium was founded by Megarian colonists.
642 BC		Tullus Hostilius died.
642 BC		The Curiate Assembly, one of the legislative assemblies of the Roman Kingdom, elected Ancus Marcius King of Rome.
617 BC		Ancus Marcius died.
616 BC		The Curiate Assembly elected Lucius Tarquinius Priscus King of Rome.

== 6th century BC ==
Year	Date	Event
575 BC		The Senate accepted the regent Servius Tullius as King of Rome.
535 BC		Servius Tullius was murdered by his daughter Tullia Minor and her husband Lucius Tarquinius Superbus, who declared himself King of Rome on the steps of the Curia Hostilia.
509 BC		The patrician Lucretia was raped by Lucius Tarquinius Superbus' son Sextus Tarquinius.
509 BC		Overthrow of the Roman monarchy: Following Lucretia's suicide, Lucius Junius Brutus called the Curiate Assembly, one of the legislative assemblies of the Roman Kingdom. The latter agreed to the overthrow and expulsion of Lucius Tarquinius Superbus and to a provisional constitution under which two consuls acted as a joint executive and a Curiate Assembly held legislative power, and swore never again to let a King rule Rome. It further elected Lucius Junius Brutus and Lucius Tarquinius Collatinus, Lucretia's husband, Died .
509 BC		Battle of Silva Arsia: Tarquinian and Veientine forces loyal to Lucius Tarquinius Superbus were defeated in the Silva Arsia by a Roman army. Lucius Junius Brutus was killed. Publius Valerius Publicola, returning to Rome with the spoils of war, died.
509 BC		The consul Publius Valerius Publicola enacted a number of liberal reforms, including opening the office of consul to all Roman citizens and placing the treasury under the administration of appointed quaestors.
509 BC	13 September	The Temple of Jupiter Optimus Maximus was ceremonially dedicated to the Capitoline Triad.
508 BC		Roman–Etruscan Wars: A Clusian army failed to conquer Rome.
504 BC		Roman–Sabine wars: Roman victory over the sabines in the battle of 504 BC by consul Publicus.
501 BC		In the face of a potential Sabine invasion, the Senate passed a senatus consultum authorizing the consuls to appoint a dictator, a magistrate who held absolute power during a national emergency. The dictator would in turn appoint the Magister equitum, the commander of the cavalry. The consuls Titus Larcius and Postumus Cominius Auruncus selected the former as dictator.

== 5th century BC ==
Year	Date	Event
496 BC		Battle of Lake Regillus: Latin League invasion near modern Frascati which sought to reinstall Lucius Tarquinius Superbus.
494 BC		First secessio plebis: Lucius Sicinius Vellutus, the plebs abandoned Rome for the nearby Monte Sacro.
471 BC		After a law allowing organization of the plebs tribe, the Plebeian Council was reorganized by tribes rather than curiae.
459 BC		Under popular pressure, the Senate increased the tribunes of the plebs from two to ten.
458 BC		During the first dictatorship of Cincinnatus, the Aequians staged an offensive, breaking a truce. Cincinnatus defeated the Aquians at the Battle of Mount Algidus and after a triumph, returned to his farm after sixteen days.
449 BC		Resolutions of the Plebeian Council were given the full force of law subject to Senate veto.
449 BC		The second of two decemviri, specially-elected ten man commissions, issued the last of the Twelve Tables, the fundamental laws of the Republic.
447 BC		The Tribal Assembly was established, and granted the right to elect quaestors.
445 BC		Lex Canuleia: Marriage between patricians and plebeians was legalized.
443 BC		The offices of the Tribuni militum consulari potestate were established. A collegium of three patrician or plebeian tribunes, one each from specific Roman tribes (the Titienses, the Ramnenses, and the Luceres), would hold the power of the consuls from year to year, subject to the Senate.
443 BC		The office of the censor, a patrician magistrate responsible for conducting the census in years without a consul, was established.
439 BC		Cincinnatus was called upon to accept a second dictatorship by the patricians to prevent Spurius Maelius from seizing power; the patricians suspected Spurius of using wheat to purchase the support of the plebeians, to set himself up as a king. Gaius Servilius Ahala was appointed magister equitum in order to stop Maelius; following an attack by Maelius, Ahala slew him. Cincinnatus again resigned his dictatorship and returned to his farm after 21 days.
435 BC		Fidenae, an important trade post on the Tiber, was captured from the Veii.
408 BC		The Tribuni militum consulari potestate held office.

== 4th century BC ==
Year	Date	Event
396 BC		Battle of Veii: Roman forces led by the dictator Marcus Furius Camillus conquered Veii.
396 BC		Roman soldiers first earned a salary ("salary" from Latin for "salt").
394 BC		The consuls held office.
391 BC		The Tribuni militum consulari potestate held office.
390 BC	18 July	Battle of the Allia: The Senones routed a Roman force at the confluence of the rivers Allia and Tiber.
390 BC		The Senones sacked Rome. Among other artifacts, books were destroyed. The history of Rome up to this point had to be mostly reconstructed and is sometimes unreliable or mythological.
367 BC		The consulship was reintroduced.
366 BC		Lucius Sextius was elected the first plebeian consul.
366 BC		The office of Praetor, which took the judiciary responsibilities of the consul and could be held only by a patrician, was established.
351 BC		The first plebeian dictator was elected.
351 BC		The first plebeian censor was elected.
343 BC		Samnite Wars: Rome marched against the Samnites, probably after an appeal from the Campanians.
343 BC		Battle of Mount Gaurus: A Samnite force was routed by a Roman army near Mount Barbaro.
342 BC		The Leges Genuciae were passed, banning a person from holding two offices at the same time, or during any ten-year period; charging interest on loans was also banned.
341 BC		Samnite Wars: The Senate agreed a peace, following an appeal by the Samnite to a previous treaty of friendship.
340 BC		Latin War: The Latin League invaded Samnium.
339 BC		A law was passed which required the election of at least one plebeian censor every five years.
338 BC		Latin War: Rome defeated the Latin League armies.
337 BC		The first plebeian Praetor was elected.
328 BC		Samnite Wars: Rome declared war on the Samnites after their failure to prevent their subjects raiding Fregellae.
321 BC		Battle of the Caudine Forks: After being trapped in a mountain pass near Caudium without a water supply, Roman forces were allowed to retreat by a Samnite army.
315 BC		Battle of Lautulae: A decisive Samnite victory near Terracina split Roman territory in two.
311 BC		Samnite Wars: The Etruscans laid siege to Sutri.
310 BC		Battle of Lake Vadimo (310 BC): Rome inflicted a substantial military defeat on the Etruscans at Lake Vadimo
308 BC		Samnite Wars: The Umbri, Picentes and Marsi joined the Samnites against Rome.
306 BC		The Hernici declared their independence from Rome.
304 BC		Rome conquered the Aequi.
304 BC		Samnite Wars: The treaty of friendship between the Romans and Samnites was restored.

== 3rd century BC ==
Year	Date	Event
300 BC		The Lex Ogulnia was passed, allowing plebeians to become priests.
298 BC		Samnite Wars: Rome declared war on the Samnites after an appeal by the Lucani.
298 BC		Samnite Wars: Rome captured the Samnite cities of Bojano and Castel di Sangro.
297 BC		Battle of Tifernum: A Roman army defeated a numerically superior Samnite force at Città di Castello.
295 BC		Battle of Sentinum: A Roman army decisively defeated a numerically superior force of Samnites, Etruscans, Umbri and Senones in coalition at Sentinum. The consul Publius Decius Mus (consul 312 BC) was killed.
294 BC		Samnite Wars: Roman and Samnite forces battled at Lucera.
293 BC		Battle of Aquilonia: A Roman army destroyed the majority of Samnite forces, probably in modern Agnone.
293 BC		A census counted about 270,000 residents of Rome.
291 BC		Samnite Wars: Rome conquered and colonized the Samnite city of Venosa.
290 BC		Samnite Wars: The last effective Samnite resistance was eliminated.
287 BC		Conflict of the Orders: A secessio plebis took place.
287 BC		Conflict of the Orders: The Lex Hortensia was passed, made resolutions of the Plebeian Council (plebiscites) binding on all Romans, they formally only applied to plebeians.
283 BC		Battle of Lake Vadimo (283 BC): A Roman army defeated a combined force of Etruscans, Boii and Senones near Lake Vadimo.
281 BC		Taranto appealed to Epirus for aid against Rome.
280 BC		Pyrrhic War: An Epirote army of some 25,000 landed at Taranto.
280 BC	July	Battle of Heraclea: A Greek coalition force led by the Epirote king Pyrrhus of Epirus defeated a Roman army after their deployment of war elephants at Heraclea Lucania.
279 BC		Battle of Asculum: A Greek force led by the Epirote king Pyrrhus defeated a Roman army at modern Ascoli Satriano, despite suffering heavy losses.
275 BC		Battle of Beneventum (275 BC): Roman and Epirote armies met in a bloody battle at Benevento.
272 BC		Pyrrhic War: Pyrrhus withdrew with his army to Epirus.
272 BC		Pyrrhic War: Taranto surrendered to Rome.
267 BC		The number of quaestors was raised from four to ten.
264 BC		Battle of Messana: A Roman force defeated a Carthaginian and Siracusani garrison at Messina, beginning the First Punic War.
262 BC		Battle of Agrigentum: Roman forces defeat Carthaginian forces in a pitched battle, giving Rome control of Sicily.
242 BC		The office of the praetor qui inter peregrinos ius dicit, a Praetor with jurisdiction over foreigners, was created.
241 BC		First Punic War: Sicily was organized as the province of Sicilia.
238 BC		Mercenary War: Carthage surrendered its claims on Sardinia and Corsica to Rome.
229 BC		Illyrian Wars: Rome invaded the territory of the Ardiaei.
228 BC		Illyrian Wars: The Ardiaei surrendered some territory, including strategically significant ports, to Rome, ending the war.
225 BC		Battle of Telamon: A Roman army decisively defeated a Gallic invasion near modern Talamone. The consul Gaius Atilius Regulus was killed.
219 BC		Illyrian Wars: Rome invaded Hvar.
218 BC		Second Punic War: A Carthaginian army departed Cartagena.
218 BC		Illyrian Wars: Demetrius of Pharos fled to Macedonia.
216 BC	2 August	Battle of Cannae: The Carthaginian general Hannibal decisively defeated a numerically superior Roman force at Cannae.
214 BC		First Macedonian War: A Macedonian fleet captured Oricum.
214 BC		Siege of Syracuse (214–212 BC): Rome laid siege to Syracuse.
212 BC		Siege of Syracuse (214–212 BC): Roman forces breached the inner citadel of Syracuse and slaughtered its inhabitants.
205 BC		First Macedonian War: Rome and Macedonia signed the Treaty of Phoenice, according to which Macedonia renounced its alliance with Carthage in exchange for Roman recognition of its gains in Illyria.
204 BC		Second Punic War: The consul Scipio Africanus landed an invasion fleet at Utica.
202 BC	19 October	Battle of Zama: A Roman army decisively defeated Carthage, probably near modern Sakiet Sidi Youssef.
201 BC		Second Punic War: Carthage accepted Roman conditions for peace, including disarmament, a war indemnity of ten thousand talents, and the cession of Iberia, ending the war.

== 2nd century BC ==
Year	Date	Event
200 BC		Second Macedonian War: A Roman fleet arrived in Illyria to relieve a Macedonian siege of Abydos.
197 BC		The provinces of Hispania Ulterior and Hispania Citerior were organized.
197 BC		The number of quaestors was increased to twelve.
197 BC		The number of Praetors was increased to six.
196 BC		Second Macedonian War: Macedonia surrendered its conquests in Greece and agreed to pay a war indemnity, ending the war.
192 BC		Roman–Seleucid War: The Seleucid Empire invaded Greece.
188 BC		Roman–Seleucid War: The Seleucid Empire signed the Treaty of Apamea, under which it surrendered all territory west of the Taurus Mountains to the Roman clients Rhodes and Pergamon and agreed to disarm its navy and pay a war indemnity of fifteen thousand talents of silver to Rome.
180 BC		The Lex Villia annalis, which established minimum ages for high office and required a minimum of two years in private life between offices, was passed.
172 BC		Third Macedonian War: Rome declared war on Macedonia.
167 BC		Third Macedonian War: The Macedonian king Perseus of Macedon was captured. Macedonia was divided into four districts subject to Rome.
155 BC		Lusitanian War: The Lusitanians of Hispania Ulterior rebelled against Rome.
150 BC		Fourth Macedonian War: Andriscus rebelled against Rome, claiming to be Perseus's son and the rightful king of Macedonia.
149 BC		Third Punic War: Rome declared war on Carthage.
149 BC		The Lex Calpurnia was passed, establishing a Praetor-led court to hear appeals against extortionate taxes levied by governors in the provinces.
148 BC		Fourth Macedonian War: Andriscus was surrendered to Rome to be executed.
146 BC		Third Punic War: Roman forces breached the city of Carthage, burned it, and enslaved its surviving inhabitants.
146 BC		Achaean War: Roman forces decisively defeated the armies of the Achaean League at Corinth.
146 BC		The province of Macedonia was organized.
146 BC		The province of Africa was organized on captured Carthaginian territory.
139 BC		Lusitanian War: The Lusitanian leader Viriatus was assassinated by his three ambassadors to Rome Audax, Ditalcus and Minurus.
139 BC		Lex Gabinia tabellaria: required a secret ballot in elections of all magistrates.
133 BC		The Tribune of the Plebs Tiberius Gracchus was beaten to death by a mob of senators led by the Pontifex Maximus Publius Cornelius Scipio Nasica Serapio (consul 138 BC).
121 BC		The province of Gallia Narbonensis was organized.
121 BC		The first Senatus consultum ultimum was passed, granting the consul Lucius Opimius emergency powers to defeat the partisans of Gaius Gracchus.
112 BC		Jugurthine War: Rome declared war on Numidia.
107 BC		Gaius Marius was elected consul.
106 BC		Marius was reelected consul.
106 BC		Jugurthine War: The Numidian king Jugurtha was imprisoned in the Mamertine Prison.
105 BC	6 October	Battle of Arausio: A coalition of the Cimbri and Teutons inflicted a serious defeat on the Roman army at modern Orange. Some hundred thousand Roman soldiers were killed.
104 BC		Marius was elected consul for the first of three years in a row.
102 BC		Battle of Aquae Sextiae: Rome decisively defeated the forces of the Teutons and Ambrones and killed some ninety thousand soldiers and civilians.
101 BC		Battle of Vercellae: An invasion of Italy by the Cimbri was decisively defeated by a numerically inferior Roman force. Some hundred thousand Cimbri soldiers and civilians were killed along with their king Boiorix.

== 1st century BC ==
Year	Date	Event
100 BC	12-13 July	Julius Caesar was born
100 BC		Marius was elected consul.
100 BC	10 December	Assassins hired by Lucius Appuleius Saturninus and Gaius Servilius Glaucia beat to death Gaius Memmius, a candidate for the consulship.
91 BC		Social War (91–87 BC): The Roman clients in Italy the Marsi, the Paeligni, the Vestini, the Marrucini, the Picentes, the Frentani, the Hirpini, the Iapyges, Pompeii, Venosa, Lucania and Samnium rebelled against Rome.
88 BC		Sulla's march on Rome: The consul Sulla led an army of his partisans across the pomerium into Rome.
88 BC		Social War (91–89 BC): The war ended.
87 BC		First Mithridatic War: Roman forces landed at Epirus.
85 BC		First Mithridatic War: A peace was agreed between Rome and Pontus under which the latter returned to its pre-war borders.
83 BC		Sulla's civil war: Sulla landed with an army at Brindisi.
83 BC		Second Mithridatic War: The Roman general Lucius Licinius Murena invaded Pontus.
82 BC		Sulla's civil war: Sulla was declared dictator.
81 BC		Second Mithridatic War: Murena withdrew from Pontus.
81 BC		Sulla resigns dictatorship after enacting numerous reforms in the same year.
80 BC		Final consulship of Sulla, he leaves Rome once the year is over.
80 BC		Sertorian War: Quintus Sertorius landed on the Iberian Peninsula in support of a Lusitanian rebellion.
73 BC		Third Mithridatic War: Pontus invaded Bithynia.
73 BC		Third Servile War: Some seventy gladiators, slaves of Lentulus Batiatus in Capua, made a violent escape.
72 BC		Sertorian War: Marcus Perpenna Vento, by now the leader of the Romans in revolt in Iberia, was executed by the general Pompey.
71 BC		Third Servile War: The slaves in rebellion were decisively defeated by Roman forces near Petelia. Their leader Spartacus was killed.
66 BC		The last of the Cilician pirates were wiped out by Pompey.
63 BC		Third Mithridatic War: Defeated, the Pontic king Mithridates VI of Pontus ordered his friend and bodyguard to kill him.
63 BC		Siege of Jerusalem (63 BC): Pompey conquered Jerusalem and entered the Holy of Holies of the Second Temple.
63 BC		Cicero was elected consul.
63 BC		Second Catilinarian conspiracy: A conspiracy led by the senator Catiline to overthrow the Republic was exposed before the Senate. The five conspirators present were summarily executed in the Mamertine Prison.
60 BC		Pompey joined a political alliance, the so-called First Triumvirate, with the consul Julius Caesar and the censor Marcus Licinius Crassus.
59 BC		Consulship of Julius Caesar.
58 BC		Gallic Wars: Roman forces barred the westward migration of the Helvetii across the Rhône.
55 BC		1st Invasion of Britain: Julius Caesar's first invasion of Britain.
54 BC		2nd Invasion of Britain: Julius Caesar's second invasion of Britain.
53 BC	6 May	Battle of Carrhae: A Parthian army decisively defeated a numerically superior Roman invasion force near Harran. Crassus was killed.
50 BC		Gallic Wars: The last Gaulish rebels were defeated.
49 BC	10 January	Caesar's Civil War: Julius Caesar illegally crossed the Rubicon into Italy with his army.
48 BC	4 January	Caesar's Civil War: Caesar landed at Durrës in pursuit of Pompey and his partisans the optimates.
46 BC	November	Caesar left Africa for Iberia in pursuit of Pompey's sons Gnaeus Pompeius and Sextus Pompey.
44 BC	15 March	Assassination of Julius Caesar: Caesar was assassinated in the Theatre of Pompey by a conspiracy of senators.
43 BC	27 November	The Lex Titia was passed, granting the Second Triumvirate of Octavian (later known as Augustus), Mark Antony and Marcus Aemilius Lepidus the power to make and annul laws and appoint magistrates.
42 BC		Liberators' civil war: Augustus and Antony led some thirty legions to northern Greece in pursuit of Caesar's assassins Marcus Junius Brutus the Younger and Gaius Cassius Longinus.
42 BC	23 October	Liberators' civil war: Brutus committed suicide after being defeated in battle.
39 BC		Augustus marries Livia Drusilla, biological mother of Tiberius making Tiberius the step-son of Augustus.
33 BC		Antony's Parthian War: A campaign led by Antony against the Parthian Empire ended in failure.
33 BC		The Second Triumvirate expired.
31 BC	2 September	Battle of Actium: Forces loyal to Augustus defeated Antony and his lover Cleopatra, queen of Egypt, in a naval battle near Actium.
30 BC	1 August	Final War of the Roman Republic: Antony's forces defected to Augustus. He committed suicide.
30 BC	30 August	Cleopatra committed suicide, probably in Roman custody and by poisoning.
30 BC		The province of Egypt was organized. Augustus took the title pharaoh.
29 BC		Moesia was annexed to Rome.
29 BC		Cantabrian Wars: Rome deployed some eighty thousand soldiers against the Cantabri in Iberia.
27 BC	16 January	The Senate granted Augustus the titles augustus, majestic, and princeps, first.
25 BC		Augustus indicated his nephew Marcus Claudius Marcellus (Julio-Claudian dynasty) as his chosen successor by marrying him to his only daughter Julia the Elder.
25 BC		The Roman client Amyntas of Galatia died. Augustus organized his territory as the province of Galatia.
24 BC		Augustus' campaigns against the Cantabrians in Hispania Tarraconensis, the Cantabrian Wars, ended.
23 BC		Coinage reform of Augustus: Augustus centralized the minting of and reformed the composition and value of the Roman currency.
23 BC		Marcellus died.
21 BC		Augustus married Julia to his general Marcus Vipsanius Agrippa.
19 BC		Cantabrian Wars: The last major combat operations ended. The Cantabri and Astures were pacified.
17 BC		Augustus adopted the sons of Agrippa and Julia, his grandsons Gaius Caesar and Lucius Caesar, as his own sons.
16 BC		Raetia and Noricum were conquered and annexed to Rome.
12 BC		Germanic Wars: Roman forces crossed the Rhine into Germania.
12 BC		Agrippa died of fever.
11 BC		Augustus married Julia to his general and stepson Tiberius.
9 BC		The Roman general Nero Claudius Drusus died from injuries sustained falling from a horse.
9 BC		Pannonia was annexed and incorporated into Illyricum.
6 BC		Augustus offered Tiberius tribunician power and imperium over the eastern half of the Empire. Tiberius refused, announcing his retirement to Rhodes.
2 BC		Augustus was acclaimed Pater Patriae, father of the country, by the Senate.
2 BC		Augustus convicted Julia of adultery and treason, annulled her marriage to Tiberius, and exiled her with her mother Scribonia to Ventotene.

== 1st century ==
Year	Date	Event
	20 August	Lucius Caesar died of a sudden illness.
		Augustus allowed Tiberius to return to Rome as a private citizen.
	21 February	Gaius Caesar died in Lycia from wounds suffered in battle.
		Augustus adopted Tiberius as his son and granted him tribunician power.
		Augustus deposed Herod Archelaus, ethnarch in Samaria, Judea and Idumea, and organized the province of Judea on his territories.
		Bellum Batonianum: The Daesitiates, an Illyrian people, rose up against Roman authority in Illyricum.
		Bellum Batonianum: The Daesitiate chieftain Bato (Daesitiate chieftain) surrendered to Roman forces.
	September	Battle of the Teutoburg Forest: A coalition of Germanic forces ambushed and destroyed three Roman legions in the Teutoburg Forest. Publius Quinctilius Varus, the commander of Roman forces in Germania, committed suicide.
AD 10		Tiberius assumed command of Roman forces in Germania.
AD 10		Illyricum was divided into the provinces of Pannonia and Dalmatia.
AD 13		Tiberius was granted power equal to Augustus as co-princeps.
AD 14	19 August	Augustus died.
AD 14		Germanicus, son of Nero Claudius Drusus and adoptive son of Tiberius, was appointed commander of Roman forces in Germania.
AD 14		Germanicus and Tiberius's natural son Drusus Julius Caesar were sent to suppress mutinies in Germania and Pannonia, respectively.
AD 15		Lucius Seius Strabo was appointed governor of Egypt. His son Sejanus remained as the sole prefect of the Praetorian Guard.
AD 16		Battle of the Weser River: A Roman army led by Germanicus decisively defeated a Germanic force on the Weser.
AD 17		Archelaus of Cappadocia, king in Cappadocia and a Roman client, died. Tiberius annexed his territory, organizing it as the province of Cappadocia.
AD 17		Antiochus III of Commagene, king of Commagene and a Roman client, died. Tiberius annexed his territory to the province of Syria.
AD 18		Tiberius granted Germanicus imperium over the eastern half of the Empire.
AD 19	10 October	Germanicus died in Antioch, possibly after being poisoned on Tiberius's orders.
AD 22		Tiberius granted Drusus Julius Caesar tribunician power, marking him as his choice as successor.
AD 23	14 September	Drusus Julius Caesar died, possibly after being poisoned by Sejanus or his wife Livilla.
AD 26		Tiberius retired to Capri, leaving Sejanus in control of Rome through his office.
AD 28		The Frisii hanged their Roman tax collectors and expelled the governor.
AD 29		Livia, Augustus's widow and Tiberius's mother, died.
AD 31	18 October	Sejanus was executed on Tiberius's orders.
AD 31		Tiberius invited Germanicus's son Caligula to join him on Capri.
AD 37	16 March	Tiberius died. His will left his offices jointly to Caligula and Drusus Julius Caesar's son, his grandson Tiberius Gemellus.
AD 38		Tiberius Gemellus was murdered on Caligula's orders.
AD 40		Ptolemy of Mauretania, king of Mauretania and a Roman client, was murdered on Caligula's orders during a state visit to Rome. His slave Aedemon rose in revolt against Roman rule.
AD 41		The general Gaius Suetonius Paulinus was appointed to suppress the rebellion in Mauretania.
AD 41	24 January	Caligula was assassinated by the centurion Cassius Chaerea.
AD 41	24 January	The Praetorian Guard acclaimed Nero Claudius Drusus's son Claudius princeps.
AD 41		Claudius restored the Judean monarchy under king Herod Agrippa.
AD 42		The territory of the former Mauretania was organized into the provinces of Mauretania Caesariensis and Mauretania Tingitana.
AD 43		Roman conquest of Britain: The senator Aulus Plautius led four legions into Great Britain in support of king Verica of the Atrebates.
AD 43		Claudius annexed Lycia into the Empire as a province.
AD 46		The Odrysian king Rhoemetalces III, a Roman client, was killed by anti-Roman insurgents.
AD 46		Odrysia was incorporated into the Empire as the province of Thracia.
AD 48		Claudius's wife Messalina was executed for conspiracy.
AD 48		Claudius appointed Herod Agrippa's son Herod Agrippa II king of Judea.
AD 49		Claudius married his niece, Germanicus's daughter Agrippina the Younger.
AD 50		Claudius adopted Agrippina's son Nero as his own son.
AD 54	13 October	Claudius died. Nero succeeded him as princeps.
AD 55	11 February	Claudius's young natural son Britannicus died, probably by poison.
AD 58		Roman–Parthian War of 58–63: Roman forces attacked Armenia in support of their preferred king Tigranes VI of Armenia against the Parthian candidate Tiridates I of Armenia.
AD 59	23 March	Agrippina died, probably murdered by her son Nero.
AD 60		Boudica, a queen of the Iceni, was appointed to lead a revolt of the Iceni and the Trinovantes against Rome.
AD 61		Battle of Watling Street: Some eighty thousand soldiers and civilians among the Iceni and Trinovantes were killed, probably in the modern West Midlands, ending Boudica's revolt.
AD 63		Roman–Parthian War of 58–63: The Roman and Parthian Empires agreed that Tiridates and his descendants would remain kings of Armenia as Roman clients, ending the war.
AD 64	18 July	Great Fire of Rome: A fire began which would cause massive property damage and loss of life over six days in Rome.
AD 64		Nero began construction of his large and extravagant villa the Domus Aurea.
AD 65	19 April	Pisonian conspiracy: Nero was informed of a broad conspiracy to assassinate him and appoint the senator Gaius Calpurnius Piso leader of Rome.
AD 66		First Jewish–Roman War: The Jewish population of Judea revolted against Roman rule.
AD 68	9 June	Nero, then in hiding in the villa of the freedman Phaon, was notified that the Senate had declared him an enemy of the state and ordered him brought to the Forum to be publicly beaten to death. He ordered his secretary Epaphroditus to kill him.
AD 68	9 June	The Senate accepted Galba, governor of Hispania Tarraconensis, as ruler of Rome.
AD 68		Zealot Temple Siege: The forces of Ananus ben Ananus, the Jewish former High Priest of Israel, laid siege to the Zealots in the Second Temple.
AD 69	15 January	The Praetorian Guard assassinated Galba and acclaimed Otho ruler of Rome.
AD 69	16 April	Following his defeat by Vitellius, the commander of the Roman army on the lower Rhine, near modern Calvatone, and to prevent further civil war, Otho committed suicide.
AD 69		Revolt of the Batavi: Gaius Julius Civilis, commander of the Batavi auxiliaries in the Rhine legions, turned against Rome.
AD 69	December	The Senate recognized Vespasian, the commander of Roman forces in Egypt and Judea, as ruler of Rome.
AD 69	22 December	Vitellius was executed in Rome by troops loyal to Vespasian.
AD 70		Revolt of the Batavi: Following a series of battlefield reversals, Civilis accepted peace terms from the Roman general Quintus Petillius Cerialis.
AD 70	September	Siege of Jerusalem (70 CE): The Roman general Titus breached the walls of Jerusalem, sacked the city and destroyed the Second Temple.
AD 71		Roman conquest of Britain: Roman forces entered modern Scotland.
AD 73	16 April	Siege of Masada: Roman forces breached the walls of Masada, a mountain fortress held by the Jewish extremist sect the Sicarii.
AD 77		Gnaeus Julius Agricola was appointed consul and governor of Britain.
AD 79	23 June	Vespasian died. He was succeeded by his son Titus.
AD 79	24 August	Eruption of Mount Vesuvius in 79: Mount Vesuvius erupted, destroying the cities of Pompeii and Herculaneum.
AD 80		Rome was partially destroyed by fire.
AD 80	March	The Colosseum was completed.
AD 81	13 September	Titus died of fever. He was succeeded by his younger brother Domitian.
AD 85		Agricola was recalled to Rome.
AD 86		Domitian's Dacian War: The Dacian king Decebalus invaded Moesia.
AD 88		Domitian's Dacian War: Decebalus agreed to return all Roman prisoners of war and accept his status as a Roman client in exchange for an annual subsidy of eight million sestertii, ending the war.
AD 89	1 January	Lucius Antonius Saturninus, governor of Germania Superior, revolted against Domitian's rule.
AD 89		Saturninus was executed.
AD 96	18 September	Domitian was assassinated by members of the royal household. Nerva was declared ruler of Rome by the Senate.
AD 97		Nerva adopted the general and former consul Trajan as his son.
AD 98	27 January	Nerva died and was succeeded by Trajan.

== 2nd century ==
Year	Date	Event
112		Trajan's Forum was inaugurated.
113		Roman–Parthian Wars: Trajan launched an expedition against Parthia.
113		Trajan's Column was erected in Trajan's Forum to commemorate the victory over Dacia.
114		Trajan deposed the Armenian king Parthamasiris of Armenia, a Roman client, and organized the province of Armenia on his territory.
115		Diaspora Revolt: The Jews in Cyrene rose up against Roman authority.
116		The provinces of Mesopotamia and Assyria were organized on territory conquered from Parthia.
116		Diaspora Revolt: The Jews of Egypt revolt
116		Trajan captured the Parthian capital Ctesiphon and deposed its shah Osroes I in favor of his son Parthamaspates of Parthia.
117		Kitos War: Roman forces captured the rebel stronghold of Lod and executed many of its inhabitants.
117		Diaspora Revolt: Roman forces suppressed the Jewish revolt in Egypt, Cyrenaica and Cyprus, resulting in the near-total elimination and expulsion of Jews from these regions.
117	8 August	Trajan died.
117	10 August	The Senate accepted the general Hadrian as ruler of Rome, following the appearance of documents indicating he had been adopted by Trajan.
117		Osroes I deposed his son Parthamaspates of Parthia and replaced him as shah of Parthia.
118		Hadrian withdrew from the territories of Armenia, Assyria and Mesopotamia, allowing the return of their respective client monarchies.
119		A rebellion took place in Britain which was suppressed by Quintus Pompeius Falco.
122		The construction of Hadrian's Wall at the northern border of Britain began.
123		Hadrian arrived in Mauretania to suppress a local revolt.
124		Hadrian travelled to Greece.
126		Hadrian returned to Rome.
126		The rebuilt Pantheon was dedicated to Agrippa, its original builder.
132		Bar Kokhba revolt: Simon bar Kokhba, believed by his followers to be the Messiah, launched a revolt against the Romans and established an independent Jewish state in Judaea, which he governed as nasi.
135		Bar Kokhba revolt: the revolt is suppressed using substantial military force, culminating in the defeat and death of its leader during the siege of Betar, as well as heavy Roman losses. The suppression caused widespread devastation across Judaea, resulting in extensive destruction, significant loss of life, mass displacement, and enslavement, which substantially reduced the Jewish population. Following the revolt, the province was renamed Syria Palaestina.
136		Hadrian adopted Lucius Aelius as his son and successor.
138	1 January	Lucius Aelius died.
138	25 February	Hadrian adopted Antoninus Pius as his son and successor and granted him tribunician power and imperium, on the condition that he in turn adopt Marcus Aurelius and Lucius Verus as his sons.
138	10 July	Hadrian died, probably from congestive heart failure.
138	11 July	Antoninus succeeded Hadrian.
141		Roman conquest of Britain: Roman forces invaded modern Scotland under the command of the British governor Quintus Lollius Urbicus.
142		The construction of the Antonine Wall at the northern border of Britain began.
161	7 March	Antoninus died. He was succeeded by Marcus and Lucius Verus.
161		Roman–Parthian War of 161–166: The Parthian Empire deposed the Armenian king Sohaemus of Armenia, a Roman client, and installed Bakur.
165		Antonine Plague: A pandemic, probably of smallpox or measles, began which would kill some five million people throughout the Roman Empire.
166		Roman–Parthian War of 161–166: Roman forces sacked the Parthian capital Ctesiphon.
169		Lucius Verus died of disease, leaving Marcus the sole ruler of Rome.
169		Marcomannic Wars: A coalition of Germanic tribes led by the Marcomanni invaded the Roman Empire across the Danube.
175		Marcomannic Wars: Rome and the Iazyges signed a treaty under which the latter agreed to return Roman prisoners of war and supply troops to the Auxilia, ending the war.
177		Marcus named his natural son Commodus co-ruler with himself.
180	17 March	Marcus died.
180		Antonine Plague: The pandemic ended.
184		The Antonine Wall was abandoned by Roman forces.
192	31 December	Commodus was strangled to death.
193	1 January	The Praetorian Guard acclaimed the consul Pertinax ruler of Rome at the Castra Praetoria.
193	28 March	Pertinax was assassinated by the Praetorian Guard.
193	28 March	The Praetorian Guard acclaimed the former consul Didius Julianus, who had provided the highest bid, ruler of Rome.
193	9 April	Pescennius Niger, the legatus Augusti pro praetore of Syria Palaestina, was proclaimed ruler of Rome by his legions.
193	14 April	The Legio XIV Gemina acclaimed its commander Septimius Severus ruler of Rome at Carnuntum.
193	May	The Senate recognized Septimius Severus as ruler of Rome and sentenced Julianus to death.
194		Battle of Issus (194): Niger's forces were decisively defeated by the armies of Septimius Severus at Issus.
196		Clodius Albinus, the commander of Roman troops in Britain and Iberia, took the title Imperator Caesar Decimus Clodius Septimius Albinus Augustus.
197	19 February	Battle of Lugdunum: Septimius Severus and Albinus met in battle at Lugdunum.
197	19 February	Albinus committed suicide or was killed.
197		Roman–Parthian Wars: Septimius Severus sacked the Parthian capital Ctesiphon.
198		Septimius Severus appointed his eldest natural son Caracalla co-ruler with himself.

== 3rd century ==
Year	Date	Event
208		Roman invasion of Caledonia 208–210: Septimius Severus invaded modern Scotland.
209		Septimius Severus named his youngest natural son Publius Septimius Geta co-ruler with himself and Caracalla.
211	4 February	Septimius Severus died.
211		Roman invasion of Caledonia 208–210: Caracalla ended the campaign.
211	26 December	Geta was murdered in his mother's arms by members of the Praetorian Guard loyal to Caracalla.
212		Constitutio Antoniniana was an edict issued by Caracalla declaring that all free men in the Roman Empire were to be given full Roman citizenship and that all free women in the Empire were to be given the same rights as Roman women.
217	8 April	Caracalla was assassinated by a member of his bodyguard.
217	8 April	The Praetorian Guard acclaimed their prefect Macrinus ruler of Rome.
218	8 June	Macrinus was captured and executed by an army loyal to Elagabalus, supposedly the illegitimate son of Caracalla.
222	11 March	Elagabalus was assassinated by the Praetorian Guard, which installed his young cousin Severus Alexander as ruler of Rome.
230		Roman–Persian Wars: The Sasanian shah Ardashir I invaded Mesopotamia and Syria.
232		Roman–Persian Wars: Alexander repelled the Sasanian invasion.
235	19 March	Alexander was killed in a mutiny of the Legio XXII Primigenia at Mainz.
235	20 March	The army elected Maximinus Thrax, commander of the Legio IV Italica, ruler of Rome.
238	22 March	Gordian I, governor of Africa, accepted the rule of Rome at the urging of rebels in his province. He appointed his son Gordian II to rule jointly with him.
238	2 April	The Senate accepted Gordian I and Gordian II as rulers of Rome.
238		Battle of Carthage (238): Forces loyal to Gordian I and Gordian II were defeated by the army of Capelianus, the governor of Numidia, who claimed fealty to Maximinus. Gordian II was killed. Gordian I committed suicide.
238	22 April	The Senate elected two senators, Pupienus and Balbinus, as joint rulers of the Empire.
238	22 April	Facing popular opposition to Pupienus and Balbinus, the Senate gave Gordian I's young grandson Gordian III the title Caesar.
238	May	Maximinus was murdered with his son during a mutiny of the Legio II Parthica at Aquileia.
238	29 July	Pupienus and Balbinus were tortured and murdered by the Praetorian Guard in their barracks.
243		Battle of Resaena: Roman forces defeated the Sasanian Empire at Resaena.
244		Battle of Misiche: The Sasanian Empire decisively defeated a Roman force at Misiche, near modern Fallujah. Gordian III was killed, probably by a fellow Roman. He was succeeded by Philip the Arab, the prefect of the Praetorian Guard, who was forced to cede Mesopotamia and Armenia to the Sasanian Empire.
249		Phillip was killed at Verona in battle with Decius, commander of Roman forces in Pannonia and Moesia.
251		Decius appointed his natural son Herennius Etruscus co-ruler of Rome jointly with himself.
251		Battle of Abritus: Roman forces were dealt a bloody defeat by the Goths near modern Razgrad. Decius and Herennius were killed.
251		The armies of the Danube region acclaimed their commander Trebonianus Gallus ruler of Rome.
251		The Senate recognized Decius's son Hostilian as ruler of Rome. Gallus adopted Hostilian as his son.
251		Plague of Cyprian: Hostilian died, probably of plague.
251		Gallus appointed his natural son Volusianus co-ruler jointly with himself.
253		Battle of Barbalissos: A Sasanian force destroyed a Roman army at Barbalissos.
253	August	Gallus and Volusianus were killed in a mutiny at Terni. The army acclaimed Aemilianus, governor of Pannonia and Moesia, ruler of Rome.
253		Aemilianus was killed by his own soldiers in the face of the army of the general Valerian (emperor).
253	22 October	Valerian gave his son Gallienus the title Caesar.
256		The Sasanian Empire conquered and sacked Antioch.
257		Valerian reconquered Antioch.
258		The Goths invaded Asia Minor.
260		Death of Dacian king Regalianus that became Roman emperor for a brief period.
260		Valerian was taken prisoner by the Sasanian Empire during truce negotiations.
260	September	The general Postumus was declared ruler of Rome in the Gallic Empire.
264		Valerian died in captivity.
267		Odaenathus, the king of Palmyra and a Roman client, was assassinated. His widow Zenobia took power as regent for their son Vaballathus.
268		Gallienus was murdered by his soldiers during a siege of Pontirolo Nuovo.
268	September	The general Claudius Gothicus was declared ruler of Rome by his soldiers.
269		Postumus was killed by his soldiers, who in turn acclaimed one of their own, Marcus Aurelius Marius, emperor of the Gallic Empire.
269		Marius was murdered by Victorinus, formerly prefect of Postumus's Praetorian Guard, who replaced him as emperor of the Gallic Empire.
269		Zenobia conquered Egypt.
269		Battle of Naissus: Roman forces decisively defeated the Goths at modern Niš, stalling an invasion of the Balkans.
270	January	Claudius Gothicus died. He was succeeded by his brother Quintillus.
270	April	Quintillus died at Aquileia.
270	September	Aurelian became ruler of Rome.
271		Battle of Fano: A Roman force defeated the Juthungi on the Metauro.
271		Victorinus was murdered by an officer he had cuckolded.
271		Tetricus I, praeses of Gallia Aquitania was acclaimed emperor of the Gallic Empire. He appointed his natural son Tetricus II to rule jointly with him.
272		Zenobia was arrested en route to refuge in the Sasanian Empire.
273		Palmyra rebelled against Roman authority and was destroyed.
274		Battle of Châlons (274): Aurelian defeated the forces of Tetricus I and Tetricus II at modern Châlons-en-Champagne.
275	September	Aurelian was murdered by the Praetorian Guard.
275	25 September	The Senate elected Tacitus (emperor) ruler of Rome.
276	June	Tacitus died.
276		Marcus Aurelius Probus, commander of Roman forces in the east and Tacitus's half-brother, was acclaimed ruler of Rome by his troops.
276		Florianus, prefect of the Praetorian Guard and commander of Roman forces in the west, was acclaimed ruler of Rome by his troops.
276	September	Florianus was assassinated near Tarsus by his troops following a defeat at the hands of Probus.
279		Probus launched a campaign against the Vandals in Illyricum.
282		The Praetorian Guard elected their prefect Carus ruler of Rome.
282		Probus was assassinated.
282		Carus gave his sons Carinus and Numerian the title Caesar.
283		Carus died.
284		Numerian died.
284	20 November	Roman forces in the east elected the consul Diocletian their ruler and proclaimed him augustus.
285	July	Battle of the Margus: Forces loyal to Diocletian defeated Carinus in battle on the Morava. Carinus was killed.
285	July	Diocletian gave Maximian the title Caesar.
286		Carausian Revolt: The naval commander Carausius declared himself emperor in Britain and northern Gaul.
286	2 April	Diocletian proclaimed Maximian augustus of the west, ruling himself as augustus of the east.
293		Diocletian established the Tetrarchy, appointing Constantius Chlorus to hold the office of Caesar under Maximian in the west and Galerius to hold the title under himself in the east.
293		Carausian Revolt: Constantius Chlorus conquered Carausius's Gallic territories.
293		Carausius was murdered by his finance minister Allectus, who replaced him as emperor in Britain.
296		Carausian Revolt: Allectus was defeated in battle and killed at Calleva Atrebatum.

== 4th century ==
Year	Date	Event
301		Diocletian issued the Edict on Maximum Prices, reforming the currency and setting price ceilings on a number of goods.
303	24 February	Diocletianic Persecution: Diocletian issued his first edict against Christians, calling for the destruction of Christian holy books and places of worship and stripping Christians of their government positions and political rights.
305	1 May	Diocletian and Maximian abdicated. Constantius and Galerius were elevated to augusti in the west and east. Galerius appointed Flavius Valerius Severus Caesar in the west and Maximinus II Caesar in the east.
306	25 July	Constantius died at Eboracum. By his dying wish, his troops acclaimed his son Constantine the Great augustus.
306		Galerius recognized Flavius Valerius Severus as augustus in the west and granted Constantine the Great the lesser title of Caesar, which he accepted.
306		Civil wars of the Tetrarchy: Rioters in Rome acclaimed Maximian's son Maxentius ruler of Rome. He took the title princeps invictus, undefeated prince.
306		Maxentius invited Maximian to reclaim the title augustus.
307		Civil wars of the Tetrarchy: Flavius Valerius Severus surrendered to Maximian at Ravenna.
307		Civil wars of the Tetrarchy: Galerius laid siege to Rome. Many of his soldiers defected to Maxentius and he was forced to flee.
308		Civil wars of the Tetrarchy: After a failed coup against his son Maxentius, Maximian was forced to flee to Constantine's court.
308	11 November	Maximian resigned as augustus. Galerius appointed Licinius augustus of the west and confirmed his recognition of Constantine the Great as Caesar of the west.
310	July	Civil wars of the Tetrarchy: Maximian was forced to commit suicide following a failed coup against Constantine the Great.
311	May	Galerius died. Licinius and Maximinus agreed to divide the eastern Empire between themselves.
311		Civil wars of the Tetrarchy: Constantine the Great concluded an alliance with Licinius, offering his half-sister Flavia Julia Constantia to him in marriage.
311		Civil wars of the Tetrarchy: Maximinus entered a secret alliance with Maxentius.
311	3 December	Diocletian died, possibly from suicide.
312	28 October	Battle of the Milvian Bridge: Constantine the Great had a vision of the cross appearing over the sun at the Ponte Milvio with the words "in this sign, conquer." His forces defeated and killed Maxentius.
313	February	Constantine the Great and Licinius issued the Edict of Milan, providing for restitution to Christians injured during the persecutions.
313	March	Licinius married Constantia.
313	30 April	Battle of Tzirallum: Licinius defeated a vastly numerically superior force loyal to Maximinus at modern Çorlu. Maximinus fled to Nicomedia.
313	August	Maximinus died at Tarsus.
314	8 October	Battle of Cibalae: Constantine the Great dealt a bloody defeat to Licinius's forces at modern Vinkovci.
317		Battle of Mardia: After a bloody battle, probably at modern Harmanli, Licinius retreated from contact with Constantine the Great.
317	1 March	Licinius recognized Constantine the Great as his superior, ceded all his territories outside of Thrace, and agreed to depose and execute Valerius Valens, whom he had raised to augustus.
324	3 July	Battle of Adrianople (324): Licinius suffered a bloody defeat at the hands of Constantine the Great on the Maritsa.
324	18 September	Battle of Chrysopolis: Constantine the Great dealt a decisive defeat to the remnants of Licinius's army. Licinius surrendered.
325	20 May	First Council of Nicaea: An ecumenical council called by Constantine the Great at Nicaea opened which would establish the Nicene Creed, asserting Jesus to be equal to and of the same substance as God the Father.
325		Licinius was executed.
326		Constantine the Great ordered the death of his oldest son Crispus.
330	11 May	Constantine the Great moved his capital to Byzantium and renamed the city Constantinople, city of Constantine.
332		Constantine the Great campaigned against the Goths.
334		Constantine the Great campaigned against the Sarmatians.
337		Roman–Persian Wars: The Sasanian shah Shapur II invaded Armenia and Mesopotamia.
337	22 May	Constantine the Great died.
337	9 September	Constantine the Great's three sons declared themselves augusti and divided their father's empire into three parts, with Constantine II (emperor) receiving Britain, Iberia, Gaul and Illyria, Constantius II Asia, Syria Palaestina and Egypt, and Constans Italy and Africa. The young Constans was placed under Constantine II's guardianship.
338		Constantine II campaigned against the Alemanni.
338		Constantine II granted Illyria to his brother Constans.
340		Constantine II invaded Italy. He was ambushed and slain at Aquileia by Constans, who inherited his territory.
341		Constans and Constantius II issued a ban against pagan sacrifice.
344		Siege of Singara: Sasanian forces failed to capture the Roman fortress of Singara.
350	18 January	Magnentius, commander of the Jovians and Herculians, was acclaimed ruler of Rome by his legions.
350		Constans was killed in Elne by followers of Magnentius.
350	3 June	Constantius Chlorus's grandson Nepotianus entered Rome with a band of gladiators and there declared himself imperator.
350	30 June	Marcellinus (magister officiorum), one of Magnentius's generals, entered Rome and executed Nepotianus.
351	15 March	Constantius II granted his cousin Constantius Gallus the title Caesar.
351	28 September	Battle of Mursa Major: Constantius II defeated Magnentius in a bloody battle in the valley of the Drava.
353		Battle of Mons Seleucus: Constantius II dealt Magnentius a decisive defeat at modern La Bâtie-Montsaléon. Magnentius committed suicide.
354		Gallus was put to death.
355	6 November	Constantius II declared Julian (emperor) Caesar and granted him command in Gaul.
357		Battle of Strasbourg: Julian defeated a vastly superior Alemanni force near Argentoratum, solidifying Roman control west of the Rhine.
360	February	The Petulantes, ordered east from Paris in preparation for a war with the Sasanian Empire, instead mutinied and proclaimed Julian augustus.
361	3 November	Constantius II named Julian as his successor before dying of fever.
363	5 March	Julian's Persian War: Roman forces embarked from Antioch on a punitive expedition against the Sasanian Empire.
363	26 June	Battle of Samarra: Sasanian forces harassed a Roman army in retreat at Samarra from a failed siege of their capital Ctesiphon. Julian was killed.
363	27 June	Julian's army declared one of their generals, Jovian (emperor), augustus.
363	July	Julian's Persian War: Jovian agreed to cede the five provinces east of the Tigris to the Sasanian Empire, ending the war.
364	17 February	Jovian died.
364	26 February	The army acclaimed the general Valentinian I the Great augustus.
364	28 March	Valentinian the Great appointed his younger brother Valens augustus with rule over the eastern Empire, and continued as augustus in the west.
375	17 November	Valentinian the Great died of a stroke. His son Gratian, then junior augustus in the west, succeeded him as senior augustus.
375	22 November	The army acclaimed Valentinian the Great's young son Valentinian II augustus of the west.
376		Fleeing Hunnic aggression, the Goths, under the leadership of the Thervingi chieftain Fritigern, crossed the Danube and entered the eastern Empire as political refugees.
376		Gothic War (376–382): Following the deaths of several Roman soldiers during civil unrest in Thrace, the officer Lupicinus arrested Fritigern and the Greuthungi chieftain Alatheus.
378	9 August	Battle of Adrianople: A combined Gothic-Alanic force decisively defeated the Roman army near Edirne. Valens was killed.
379	19 January	Gratian named the general Theodosius I the Great augustus in the east.
380	27 February	Theodosius the Great issued the Edict of Thessalonica, making Christianity the state church of the Roman Empire.
382	3 October	Gothic War (376–382): The Goths were made foederati of Rome and granted land and autonomy in Thrace, ending the war.
383	25 August	Gratian was delivered by mutineers to the Magister equitum Andragathius and executed.
392	15 May	Valentinian II was found hanged in his residence. He may have been murdered by his guardian, the Frankish general Arbogast.
392	22 August	Arbogast declared Eugenius augustus and ruler in the west.
393	23 January	Theodosius the Great appointed his younger son Honorius (emperor) augustus in the west.
394	6 September	Battle of the Frigidus: Forces loyal to Theodosius the Great defeated and killed Arbogast and Eugenius, probably near the Vipava.
395	17 January	Theodosius the Great died. His elder son Arcadius succeeded him as augustus in the eastern Byzantine Empire. The young Honorius became sole augustus in the Western Roman Empire under the regency of Magister militum Stilicho.
398		Gildonic War: Gildo, comes of Africa, was killed following a failed rebellion against the Western Roman Empire.

== 5th century ==
Year	Date	Event
402		The capital of the Western Roman Empire was moved to Ravenna.
406	31 December	Crossing of the Rhine: A coalition of foreign tribes including the Vandals, Alans and Suebi invaded the Western Roman Empire across the Rhine.
408	1 May	Arcadius died.
410	24 August	Sack of Rome (410): Rome was sacked by the Visigoths under their king Alaric I.
410		End of Roman rule in Britain: The last Roman forces left Britain.
421	8 February	Honorius appointed his brother-in-law and Magister militum Constantius III co-ruler of the Western Roman Empire with himself.
421	2 September	Constantius III died.
423	15 August	Honorius died.
423		The Western Roman patrician Castinus declared the primicerius Joannes augustus.
424	23 October	The Byzantine augustus Theodosius II the Younger, the Calligrapher named the young Valentinian III, his cousin and Constantius III's son, Caesar with rule over the west. His mother Galla Placidia was appointed regent.
425		Joannes was executed in Aquileia.
447		Battle of the Utus: The Huns under Attila defeated a Byzantine army in a bloody battle near the Utus.
450	28 July	Theodosius the Younger died in a riding accident.
452		Attila abandoned his invasion of Italy following a meeting at the Mincio with the pope Pope Leo I.
455	16 March	Valentinian III was assassinated on orders of the senator Petronius Maximus.
455	17 March	The Senate acclaimed Maximus augustus of the Western Roman Empire.
455	31 May	Maximus was killed by a mob as he attempted to flee Rome in the face of a Vandal advance.
455	2 June	Sack of Rome (455): The Vandals entered and began to sack Rome.
455	9 July	The Magister militum Avitus was pronounced augustus of the Western Roman Empire at Toulouse by the Visigothic king Theodoric II.
456	17 October	Avitus was forced to flee Rome following a military coup by the general Ricimer and the domesticus Majorian.
457		Avitus died.
457	27 January	The Byzantine augustus Marcian died.
457	28 February	The Byzantine augustus Leo I the Thracian appointed Majorian Magister militum in the west.
457	1 April	The army acclaimed Majorian augustus of the Western Roman Empire.
461	7 August	Majorian was killed after torture near the Staffora on Ricimer's orders.
461	19 November	The Senate elected Libius Severus from among their number as augustus of the Western Roman Empire.
465	15 August	Severus died.
467	12 April	Leo the Thracian elevated the comes Anthemius to Caesar with rule over the Western Roman Empire.
468		Battle of Cap Bon (468): The Vandal Kingdom destroyed a combined Western Roman and Byzantine invasion fleet at Cap Bon.
472	11 July	Anthemius was killed in flight following Ricimer's conquest of Rome. Maximus's son Olybrius was acclaimed augustus of the Western Roman Empire.
472	18 August	Ricimer died.
472		Ricimer's nephew Gundobad succeeded him as Magister militum and took the title Patrician.
472		Olybrius died.
473	3 March	The Germanic elements of the army elected the domesticus Glycerius augustus of the Western Roman Empire.
473		Gundobad relinquished his Western Roman titles to succeed his father as king of Burgundy.
474		Leo the Thracian appointed Julius Nepos, his nephew and governor of Dalmatia, ruler of the Western Roman Empire in opposition to Glycerius.
474	18 January	Leo the Thracian died. He was succeeded by his grandson Leo II (emperor).
474	9 February	Zeno (emperor) became co-augustus of the Byzantine Empire with his young son Leo II.
474	July	Nepos deposed Glycerius.
474	17 November	Leo II died, possibly after being poisoned by his mother Ariadne (empress).
475	January	Zeno was forced to flee Constantinople for his homeland Isauria in the face of a popular revolt.
475	9 January	Basiliscus, brother of Leo the Thracian's widow Verina, was acclaimed augustus of the Byzantine Empire by the Byzantine Senate.
475		Nepos appointed Orestes (father of Romulus Augustulus) Magister militum and commander-in-chief of the Western Roman military.
475	28 August	Orestes took control of the Western Roman capital Ravenna, forcing Nepos to flee to Dalmatia.
475	31 October	Orestes declared his young son Romulus Augustulus augustus of the Western Roman Empire.
476	August	Zeno recaptured Constantinople and accepted Basiliscus's surrender.
476	23 August	Germanic foederati under the command of the general Odoacer renounced Western Roman authority and declared Odoacer their king.
476	28 August	Odoacer captured and executed Orestes at Piacenza.
476	4 September	Odoacer conquered the Western Roman capital Ravenna, forced Romulus to abdicate and declared himself king of Italy.
476		The Senate sent Zeno the imperial regalia of the Western Roman Empire.
480	25 April	Nepos was murdered in his residence in Split.
491	9 April	Zeno died.

== 6th century ==
Year	Date	Event
518	9 July	Augustus Anastasius I Dicorus died.
527	1 April	Augustus Justin I appointed his older son Justinian I the Great co-augustus with himself.
527	1 August	Justin I died.
529	7 April	The Codex Justinianeus, which attempted to consolidate and reconcile contradictions in Roman law, was promulgated.
532		Justinian the Great ordered the construction of the Hagia Sophia in Constantinople.
533	21 June	Vandalic War: A Byzantine force under the general Belisarius departed for the Vandal Kingdom.
533	13 September	Battle of Ad Decimum: A Byzantine army defeated a Vandal force near Carthage.
533	15 December	Battle of Tricamarum: The Byzantines defeated a Vandal army and forced their king Gelimer into flight.
534	March	Vandalic War: Gelimer surrendered to Belisarius and accepted his offer of a peaceful retirement in Galatia, ending the war. The territory of the Vandal Kingdom was reorganized as the praetorian prefecture of Africa.
535		Gothic War (535–554): Byzantine forces crossing from Africa invaded Sicily, then an Ostrogothic possession.
536	December	Gothic War (535–554): Byzantium took Rome with little Ostrogothic resistance.
537	27 December	The Hagia Sophia was completed.
541		Plague of Justinian: Outbreak of the first plague pandemic caused by Yersinia pestis, which would kill millions of romans all over the empire and afflict the Mediterranean for centuries to come.
552	July	Battle of Taginae: A Byzantine army dealt a decisive defeat to the Ostrogoths at Gualdo Tadino. The Ostrogoth king Totila was killed.
553		Battle of Mons Lactarius: An Ostrogothic force was ambushed and destroyed at Monti Lattari on its way to relieve a Byzantine siege of Cumae. The Ostrogoth king Teia was killed.
565	March	Belisarius died.
565	14 November	Justinian the Great died.
568		The Lombards invaded Italy.
573		The general Narses died.
574		Augustus Justin II began to suffer from fits of insanity.
578	5 October	Justin II died.
582	14 August	Augustus Tiberius II Constantine died.

== 7th century ==
Year	Date	Event
602		Byzantine–Sasanian War of 602–628: The Sasanian Empire declared war on Byzantium.
607	1 August	Augustus Phocas dedicated the Column of Phocas in the Roman Forum.
626	June	Siege of Constantinople (626): Sasanian and Avar forces laid siege to Constantinople.
634	April	Muslim conquest of the Levant: A Rashidun army departed Medina for the Levant.
640	January	Muslim conquest of Egypt: A Rashidun force laid siege to Pelusium.
640		The legions of the East Roman army were reorganized into themes.
641	8 November	Siege of Alexandria (641): Byzantine authorities in the Egyptian capital Alexandria surrendered to the besieging Rashidun army.
663		Basileus Constans II visited Rome.
698		Battle of Carthage (698): An Umayyad siege and blockade of Carthage forced the retreat of Byzantine forces. The city was conquered and destroyed.

== 8th century ==
Year	Date	Event
717		Siege of Constantinople (717–718): The Umayyad Caliphate besieges the city of Constantinople.
718	15 August	Siege of Constantinople (717–718): The Umayyad Caliphate lifts the siege of Constantinople due to Famine, Disease and an unusually hard winter.
730		Basileus Leo III the Isaurian promulgated an edict forbidding the veneration of religious images, beginning the first Byzantine Iconoclasm.
787	23 October	Second Council of Nicaea: An ecumenical council in Nicaea ended which endorsed the veneration of images, ending the first Byzantine Iconoclasm.

== 9th century ==
Year	Date	Event
813	June	A group of soldiers broke into the Church of the Holy Apostles and pleaded with the body of the iconoclast basileus Constantine V to restore the Empire, marking the beginning of the second Byzantine Iconoclasm.
843		The Byzantine regent Theodora (wife of Theophilos) restored the veneration of religious images, ending the second Byzantine Iconoclasm.
867	24 September	Basileus Michael III was assassinated by his co-basileus Basil I, who became sole ruler of the Empire.

== 10th century ==
Year	Date	Event
976	10 January	Basileus John I Tzimiskes died. His co-basileus and nephew Basil II became sole ruler of the Empire.

== 11th century ==
Year	Date	Event
1002		Byzantine conquest of Bulgaria: Byzantine forces invaded Bulgaria.
1014	29 July	Battle of Kleidion: Basil dealt a decisive and bloody defeat to Bulgarian forces in the Belasica near Klyuch.
1018		Byzantine conquest of Bulgaria: The Bulgarian boyars accepted the establishment of the theme of Bulgaria on the territory of the former Empire, with significant autonomy for themselves.
1025	15 December	Basil died.
1054	16 July	East–West Schism: The papal legate Humbert of Silva Candida laid on the altar of Hagia Sophia a document proclaiming the excommunication of Michael I Cerularius, the patriarch of Constantinople.
1071	15 April	Siege of Bari: Italo-Norman forces captured Bari, capital of the katepanikion of Italy.
1071	26 August	Battle of Manzikert: The Byzantine Empire was decisively defeated by a Seljuk force near Malazgirt. The basileus Romanos IV Diogenes was captured.
1081	1 April	Nikephoros III Botaneiates was deposed and replaced as basileus by Alexios I Komnenos.
1091	29 April	Battle of Levounion: The Byzantine army dealt a bloody defeat to a Pecheneg invasion force.
1097	19 June	Siege of Nicaea: The Rum occupants of Nicaea surrendered to Byzantine and First Crusader forces.
1098		Following the conquest of Antioch, the First Crusader leader Bohemond I of Antioch declared himself prince of Antioch.

== 12th century ==
Year	Date	Event
1118	15 August	Reign of John II begins: Being considered the greatest Komnenoi emperor, he starts extensive damage control.
1122		Battle of Beroia: A Byzantine army wiped out the Pechenegs at Stara Zagora.
1124		War with Venice begins: Over the non-renewal of trading privileges by John II Komnenos.
1126		The war with Venice ends in defeat: The Venetian fleet ravaged the coasts of Greece, forcing the emperor to back down.
1127		Hungarians invade the Empire: Invaders go far south as Philippolis.
1129		Invading Hungarins are repelled
1136		John II launches his first serious campaign in the east.
1137		John II conquers the Armenian Kingdom of Cilicia.
1139		John II vassalizes the Principality of Antioch.
1143		Death of John II: his death marks the beginning of straight decline.
1146		Sack of Philomelion: Under the orders from Manuel I, before relocating the Christian population.
1167	8 July	Battle of Sirmium: Byzantium decisively defeated a Hungarian force at Sirmium.
1176	17 September	Battle of Myriokephalon: A Byzantine invasion force was ambushed and forced to retreat through a mountain pass by Rum near Lake Beyşehir.
1180	24 September	Basileus Manuel I Komnenos died.
1185	26 October	Uprising of Asen and Peter: A tax revolt began in Paristrion which would result in the establishment of the Second Bulgarian Empire.

== 13th century ==
Year	Date	Event
1204	13 April	Siege of Constantinople (1204): Fourth Crusaders breached and sacked Constantinople, deposed the basileus Alexios V Doukas and established the Latin Empire under their leader Baldwin I, Latin Emperor as Latin Emperor. Theodore I Laskaris was acclaimed basileus but forced to flee with his court to establish the Empire of Nicaea at Nicaea.
1204	April	Alexios I of Trebizond, a grandson of the former basileus Andronikos I Komnenos, declared himself ruler of Trebizond.
1205		Michael I Komnenos Doukas, a descendant of Alexios I Komnenos, established himself as despot of Epirus.
1261	25 July	The Nicaean ruler Michael VIII Palaiologos conquered Constantinople .
1261	15 August	Michael was crowned basileus in Constantinople along with his infant son Andronikos II Palaiologos.

== 14th century ==
Year	Date	Event
1326		Byzantine–Ottoman Wars: The Ottoman Empire conquered Bursa.
1331		Byzantine–Ottoman Wars: The Ottoman Empire captured Nicaea.
1341	26 October	Byzantine civil war of 1341–47: The regent John VI Kantakouzenos was declared basileus by his supporters in opposition to the young John V Palaiologos.
1347	8 February	Byzantine civil war of 1341–47: John VI concluded an arrangement under which he would rule as senior basileus alongside John V for ten years.

== 15th century ==
Year	Date	Event
1453	29 May	Fall of Constantinople: Ottoman forces entered Constantinople. Basileus Constantine XI Palaiologos was killed.

== See also ==
- Index of ancient Rome–related articles
- History of the Roman Empire
- List of Roman emperors
- Outline of ancient Rome
- Outline of the Byzantine Empire

== Sources ==
- Eshel, Hanan (2006). "The Bar Kochba Revolt, 132–135". In Katz, Steven T. (ed.). The Late Roman-Rabbinic Period. The Cambridge History of Judaism. Vol. 4th. Cambridge University Press. ISBN 978-0-521-77248-8.
- Kerkeslager, Allen (2006). "The Jews in Egypt and Cyrenaica, 66–c. 235 CE". In Katz, Steven T. (ed.). The Late Roman-Rabbinic Period. The Cambridge History of Judaism. Vol. 4th. Cambridge University Press. ISBN 978-0-521-77248-8.
