= 283 BC =

283 BC in various calendars
- Gregorian calendar: 283 BC; CCLXXXIII BC
- Ab urbe condita: 471
- Ancient Egypt era: XXXIII dynasty, 41
- Pharaoh: Ptolemy II Philadelphus, 1
- Ancient Greek Olympiad (summer): 124th Olympiad, year 2
- Assyrian calendar: 4468
- Balinese saka calendar: N/A
- Bengali calendar: −876 – −875
- Berber calendar: 668
- Buddhist calendar: 262
- Burmese calendar: −920
- Byzantine calendar: 5226–5227
- Chinese calendar: 丁丑年 (Fire Ox); 2415 or 2208 — to — 戊寅年 (Earth Tiger); 2416 or 2209
- Coptic calendar: −566 – −565
- Discordian calendar: 884
- Ethiopian calendar: −290 – −289
- Hebrew calendar: 3478–3479
- Hindu calendars
- Vikram Samvat: −226 – −225
- Shaka Samvat: N/A
- Kali Yuga: 2818–2819
- Holocene calendar: 9718
- Iranian calendar: 904 BP – 903 BP
- Islamic calendar: 932 BH – 931 BH
- Javanese calendar: N/A
- Julian calendar: N/A
- Korean calendar: 2051
- Minguo calendar: 2194 before ROC 民前2194年
- Nanakshahi calendar: −1750
- Seleucid era: 29/30 AG
- Thai solar calendar: 260–261
- Tibetan calendar: མེ་མོ་གླང་ལོ་ (female Fire-Ox) −156 or −537 or −1309 — to — ས་ཕོ་སྟག་ལོ་ (male Earth-Tiger) −155 or −536 or −1308

Year 283 BC was a year of the pre-Julian Roman calendar. At the time it was known as the Year of the Consulship of Dolabella and Maximus (or, less frequently, year 471 Ab urbe condita). The denomination 283 BC for this year has been used since the early medieval period, when the Anno Domini calendar era became the prevalent method in Europe for naming years.

== Events ==
=== By place ===
==== Greece ====
- Following Demetrius Poliorcetes' death in captivity as a prisoner of Seleucus, his son Antigonus assumes the title of King of Macedonia, though in name only, as King Lysimachus of Thrace is in control of Macedonia. Demetrius' remains are given to Antigonus and he is honoured with a grand funeral in Corinth. After this, Demetrius is interred in the town of Demetrias which he had founded.

==== Roman Republic ====
- Consuls: Publius Cornelius Dolabella and Gnaeus Domitius Calvinus Maximus.
- At the Battle of Lake Vadimo, Roman forces finally quell the allied Etruscans and Gauls. The Roman army is led by consul Publius Cornelius Dolabella. Rome is at last undisputed master of northern and central Italy.

==== Egypt ====
- The canal from the Nile River to the Red Sea, initially started but not completed by the Egyptian pharaoh Necho II and repaired by the Persian king Darius I, is again repaired and made operational by Ptolemy II.
- Ptolemy II enlarges the library at Alexandria and appoints the grammarian Zenodotus to collect and edit all the Greek poets.

==== China ====
- General Lian Po of the State of Zhou defeats an army of the State of Qi and captures the city of Yangqin.

== Deaths ==
- Demetrius I Poliorcetes, King of Macedonia (b. 336 BC)
