= Battle of Lake Vadimo =

The Battle of Lake Vadimo may refer to battles:

- Battle of Lake Vadimo (310 BC), a Roman Republic victory over an Etruscan army
- Battle of Lake Vadimo (283 BC), a Roman Republic victory over a joint Etruscan -Gaulish army
