= Britomaris =

Gallic leader

Britomaris (fl. 280s BC) was a war chief of the Senone tribe of the Gauls of northern Italy. He is briefly mentioned in a text by Appian, who said that he killed some Roman ambassadors who were sent to remonstrate about him providing mercenaries for forces which fought the Romans despite having signed a treaty with Rome. Britomaris killed the ambassadors because he was angry about his father having been killed while fighting on the side of the Etruscans "in this very war." Publius Cornelius Dolabella (the consul for 283 BC) then devastated the ager Gallicus (the name the Romans gave to the land which had been conquered by the Senones), killed all the men, enslaved the women and children and made the place uninhabitable. Britomaris was taken prisoner for torture.

Appian also wrote that "[a] little later the Senones (who were serving as mercenaries), having no longer any homes to return to, fell boldly upon the consul Domitius, and being defeated by him killed themselves in despair." It is not clear which battle this was. It could have been the Battle of Lake Vadimo of the same year, fought by Etruscan and Gallic forces, or probably, and more likely, another battle, mentioned by Polybius, which was fought after this and where the Etruscans and Gauls were defeated again and sued for peace.
