= Quintus Aemilius Papus =

3rd-century BC Roman consul and general

Quintus Aemilius Papus (fl. 282 BC – 275 BC) was a Roman politician and patrician aristocrat who was consul in 282 and 278 BC and, later, was censor in 275. He fought in Roman wars in Etruria and Cisalpine Gaul as well as the Pyrrhic War.

== Career ==
The first office recorded for Aemilius in Magistrates of the Roman Republic is the consulship of 282 BC, which he held with Gaius Fabricius Luscinus as his colleague. Cicero, writing in De Amicitia, depicts the two of them as close friends. That year, Aemilius campaigned in Etruria against the Etruscans and the Gallic Boii, defeating them at Vetulonia and forcing the Gallic contingent to sue for peace.

In 282 BC, the Roman army under his consulship defeated the Etruscans at the Battle of Populonia.

During the Pyrrhic War he served as an envoy in 280 BC. Rome sent three envoys, Aemilius, his former consular colleague Fabricius, and the former consul of 283 BC Publius Cornelius Dolabella. Meeting with Pyrrhus on the matter of Roman prisoners taken at the Battle of Heraclea that year in the winter of 280/79, little is recorded as to Aemilius' activities: the sources mainly focus on Fabricius. Regardless, the negotiators were successful in having some Romans released and securing a Epirote delegation to come to Rome to see if a peaceful settlement could be reached. The specific terms of the release are not clear: sources disagree as to whether it was time-limited, conditional on an actual peace, a stratagem to plant a fifth column, or simply an act of good faith.

A couple years later, in 278 BC, Aemilius and Fabricius again served as consuls. With Pyrrhus having left southern Italy for Sicily early in that year, the Romans retook the initiative there with Fabricius winning a triumph that year over the Lucanians, Bruttians, Tarentines, and Samnites. Sources are however silent as to what Aemilius activities were; he was likely assigned also to southern Italy but nothing noteworthy is recorded. He may have been ambushed off the coast by Tarentine naval forces but it is not clear whether this occurred in 278 or 282.

The two men served again together in the censorship of 275 BC. Fabricius is recorded that year as having expelled the consular Publius Cornelius Rufinus (consul for the second time in 278) from the Senate for owning extravagant silver drinking cups. It is plausible that the pair focused on sumptuary regulations. Valerius Maximus mentions the pair (4.4.3) as having owned silver but in an acceptable manner due to their silver dishes being religiously significant.

== Family ==
William Smith's 1848 Dictionary of Greek and Roman Biography and Mythology suggests that Lucius Aemilius Papus was the son of this Quintus Aemilius Papus. The two men are both descended from a Gnaeus Aemilius – the Digital Prosopography of the Roman Republic gives Quintus' filiation as Cn. f. L. n. with Lucius' filiation as Q. f. Cn. n. – and are possibly related.

== Bibliography ==
- Broughton, Thomas Robert Shannon (1951). The magistrates of the Roman republic. Vol. 1. New York: American Philological Association.
- Broughton, Thomas Robert Shannon (1986). The magistrates of the Roman republic. Vol. 3. Atlanta, GA: Scholars Press.
- Cicero. "De amicitia" [On friendship].
- Kent, Patrick Alan (2020). A history of the Pyrrhic war. Routledge. ISBN 978-1-138-54382-9.
- Valerius Maximus. Facta et dicta memorabilia [Memorable deeds and sayings]. Translated by Walker, Henry. Hackett. ISBN 0-87220-675-0. OCLC 53231884.

Political offices
Preceded by Publius Cornelius Dolabella and Gnaeus Domitius Calvinus Maximus	Consul of the Roman Republic with Gaius Fabricius Luscinus; 282 BC	Succeeded by Lucius Aemilius Barbula and Quintus Marcius Philippus
Preceded by Publius Sulpicius Saverrio and Publius Decius Mus	Consul of the Roman Republic with Gaius Fabricius Luscinus; 278 BC	Succeeded by Publius Cornelius Rufinus and Gaius Julius Bubulcus Brutus
