= 284 BC =

284 BC in various calendars
- Gregorian calendar: 284 BC; CCLXXXIV BC
- Ab urbe condita: 470
- Ancient Egypt era: XXXIII dynasty, 40
- Pharaoh: Ptolemy I Soter, 40
- Ancient Greek Olympiad (summer): 124th Olympiad (victor)¹
- Assyrian calendar: 4467
- Balinese saka calendar: N/A
- Bengali calendar: −877 – −876
- Berber calendar: 667
- Buddhist calendar: 261
- Burmese calendar: −921
- Byzantine calendar: 5225–5226
- Chinese calendar: 丙子年 (Fire Rat); 2414 or 2207 — to — 丁丑年 (Fire Ox); 2415 or 2208
- Coptic calendar: −567 – −566
- Discordian calendar: 883
- Ethiopian calendar: −291 – −290
- Hebrew calendar: 3477–3478
- Hindu calendars
- Vikram Samvat: −227 – −226
- Shaka Samvat: N/A
- Kali Yuga: 2817–2818
- Holocene calendar: 9717
- Iranian calendar: 905 BP – 904 BP
- Islamic calendar: 933 BH – 932 BH
- Javanese calendar: N/A
- Julian calendar: N/A
- Korean calendar: 2050
- Minguo calendar: 2195 before ROC 民前2195年
- Nanakshahi calendar: −1751
- Seleucid era: 28/29 AG
- Thai solar calendar: 259–260
- Tibetan calendar: མེ་ཕོ་བྱི་བ་ལོ་ (male Fire-Rat) −157 or −538 or −1310 — to — མེ་མོ་གླང་ལོ་ (female Fire-Ox) −156 or −537 or −1309

Year 284 BC was a year of the pre-Julian Roman calendar. At the time it was known as the Year of the Consulship of Tucca and Denter/Dentatus (or, less frequently, year 470 Ab urbe condita). The denomination 284 BC for this year has been used since the early medieval period, when the Anno Domini calendar era became the prevalent method in Europe for naming years.

== Events ==
=== By place ===
==== Roman Republic ====
- The Gallic tribe called the Senones, who have settled on the Adriatic coast north of Picenum, attack Arretium in Etruria. While attempting to relieve this allied city, the Romans under the command of Lucius Caecilius Metellus Denter suffer a costly defeat in the Battle of Arretium. Aroused by this disaster, a Roman army under Manius Curius Dentatus invades the Senones' territory, defeating them and driving them out of the Italian peninsula.

==== Asia Minor ====
- Ptolemy I's eldest (legitimate) son, Ptolemy Keraunos, whose mother, Eurydice, the daughter of Antipater, had been repudiated by the new King Ptolemy II, flees Egypt to the court of Lysimachus, the king of Thrace, Macedon and Asia Minor.
- Lysimachus' wife, Arsinoe, being keen to gain the succession to the kingdom of Thrace for her sons in preference to Agathocles (the eldest son of Lysimachus), intrigues against him with the help of her brother Ptolemy Keraunos. They accuse him of conspiring with Seleucus to seize the throne, and Agathocles is put to death. This atrocious deed by Lysimachus and his family arouses great indignation. Many of the cities in Asia Minor revolt and some of his most trusted friends desert him.
- Agathocles' widow Lysandra flees with their children and with Alexander, Agathocles' brother, to the court of Seleucus, who at once invades Lysimachus' territory in Asia Minor.

=== By subject ===
==== Culture ====
- The Ptolemaic court appoints Zenodotus of Ephesus as first Director of the Library of Alexandria.

== Deaths ==
- Agathocles, son of King Lysimachus of Thrace
- Ardvates, governor and later ruler of Armenia who founds a dynasty that will rule until 211 BC
- Lucius Caecilius Metellus Denter, Roman consul and general (killed in the Battle of Arretium) (b. c. 320 BC)
