= Fabricia gens =

Ancient Roman family

The gens Fabricia was a plebeian family of ancient Rome. Members of this gens are known from the early third century BC down to the end of the Republic, but they seldom attained positions of importance in the Roman state.

== Origin ==
The Fabricii seem to have belonged originally to the Hernician town of Aletrium, where Fabricii occur as late as the time of Cicero. The first Fabricius who occurs in history is the celebrated Gaius Fabricius Luscinus, who distinguished himself in the war against Pyrrhus, and who was probably the first of the Fabricii who left his native place and settled at Rome. We know that in 306 BC, shortly before the war with Pyrrhus, most of the Hernician towns revolted against Rome, but were subdued and compelled to accept the Roman franchise without suffrage. But three towns, Aletrium, Ferentinum, and Verulae, which had remained faithful to Rome, were allowed to retain their former constitution; that is, they remained to Rome in the relation of isopolity.

Gaius Fabricius Luscinus probably left Aletrium either at that time or soon after, and settled at Rome, where, like other settlers from isopolite towns, he soon rose to high honours. Besides this Fabricius, no members of his family appear to have risen to any eminence at Rome; and we must conclude that they were either men of inferior talent, or what is more probable, that being strangers, they laboured under great disadvantages, and that the jealousy of the illustrious Roman families, plebeian as well as patrician, kept them down, and prevented their maintaining the position which their sire had gained.

== Praenomina used ==
The early Fabricii favoured the praenomina Gaius and Lucius. In later generations, we also find Quintus and Aulus.

== Branches and cognomina ==
Luscinus is the only cognomen of the Fabricii that we meet with under the Republic. In the time of the Empire we find a Fabricius with the cognomen Veiento. There are a few without a cognomen.

== Members ==
This list includes abbreviated praenomina. For an explanation of this practice, see filiation.

- Gaius Fabricius, grandfather of the consul of 282 BC.
- Gaius Fabricius C. f., father of the consul of 282 BC.
- Gaius Fabricius C. f. C. n. Luscinus, consul in 282 and 278 BC, and censor in 275.
- Gaius Fabricius (C. f. C. n.) Luscinus, praetor urbanus in 195 BC, and legate to the consul Lucius Cornelius Scipio Asiaticus in 190.
- Gaius and Lucius Fabricius belonged to the municipium of Aletrium, and were twins. According to Cicero they were both men of bad character; and C. Fabricius, in particular, was charged with having allowed himself to be made use of as a tool of Oppianicus, about BC 67, to destroy Aulus Cluentius.
- Lucius Fabricius C. f., was curator viarum in BC 62, and built a new bridge of stone, which connected the city with the island in the Tiber, and which was called, after him, pons Fabricius. The time at which the bridge was built is expressly mentioned by Cassius Dio, and the name of its author is still seen on the remnants of the bridge, which now bears the name of ponte quattro capi. The scholiast on Horatius mistakenly calls the Fabricius who built this bridge a consul. There is also a coin bearing the name of Lucius Fabricius.
- Quintus Fabricius was tribune of the plebs in BC 57, and well disposed towards Cicero, who was then living in exile. He brought before the people a motion that Cicero should be recalled, as early as the month of January of that year. But the attempt was frustrated by Publius Clodius Pulcher by armed force. In the Monumentum Ancyranum and in Cassius Dio, he is mentioned as consul suffectus of the year BC 36.
- Lucius Fabricius, a duumvir of Carthago Nova between 54 and 40 BC. He minted bronze coins during his magistracy.
- Quintus Fabricius, suffect consul in 2 BC. A Novus homo.
- Aulus Fabricius Veiento, praetor during the reign of Nero, he was banished for publishing a number of libels, and for supposedly selling the honours granted by the emperor. He subsequently returned to Rome and became a favourite of Domitian. According to Aurelius Victor, served as consul under Domitian, although his name does not appear in the consular fasti.

== See also ==
- List of Roman gentes

== Bibliography ==
- Luis Amela Valverde, "Las primeras emisiones (tardo-republicanas) del taller de Carthago Nova. Unas notas", OMNI, n°7, 07-2015.
