= Battle of Populonia =

Battle in 282 BC

- Part of the Roman–Etruscan Wars
Date	282 BC
Location	Populonia, Italy
Result	Roman victory

Belligerents
Roman Republic	Etruscans

Commanders and leaders
Quintus Aemilius Papus	Unknown

The Battle of Populonia was fought in 282 BC between the Roman Republic under the consulship of Quintus Aemilius Papus and the Etruscans. The Etruscans and Boii were in revolt against Rome. The Romans were victorious, and the Etruscan threat to Rome sharply diminished after this battle.

== History ==
In 282 BC Aemilius advanced to meet the Etruscans/Boii as far as Populonia; he was just about to descend from the heights into the valley when, from flocks of birds flying out of the forest, he guessed that something was happening there; scouts sent there reported that the Boii were lying in ambush. The consul outflanked them, the enemy was surrounded and routed. After this defeat, the Boii began to sue for peace.

The Romans now had no desire to pursue the Boii across the Apennines on their native soil; they were content to deprive the Etruscans of this reinforcement and therefore agreed to peace.
