= Gaius Fabricius Luscinus =

Ancient Roman ambassador and politician

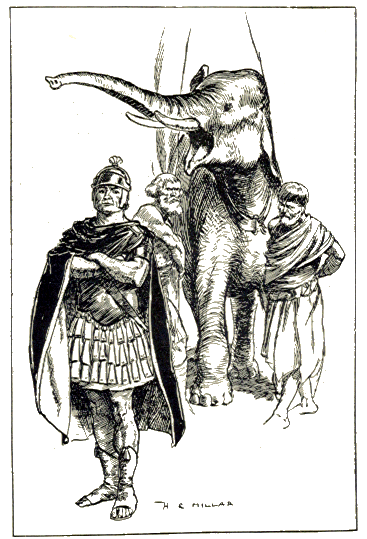
Gaius Fabricius Luscinus with elephant

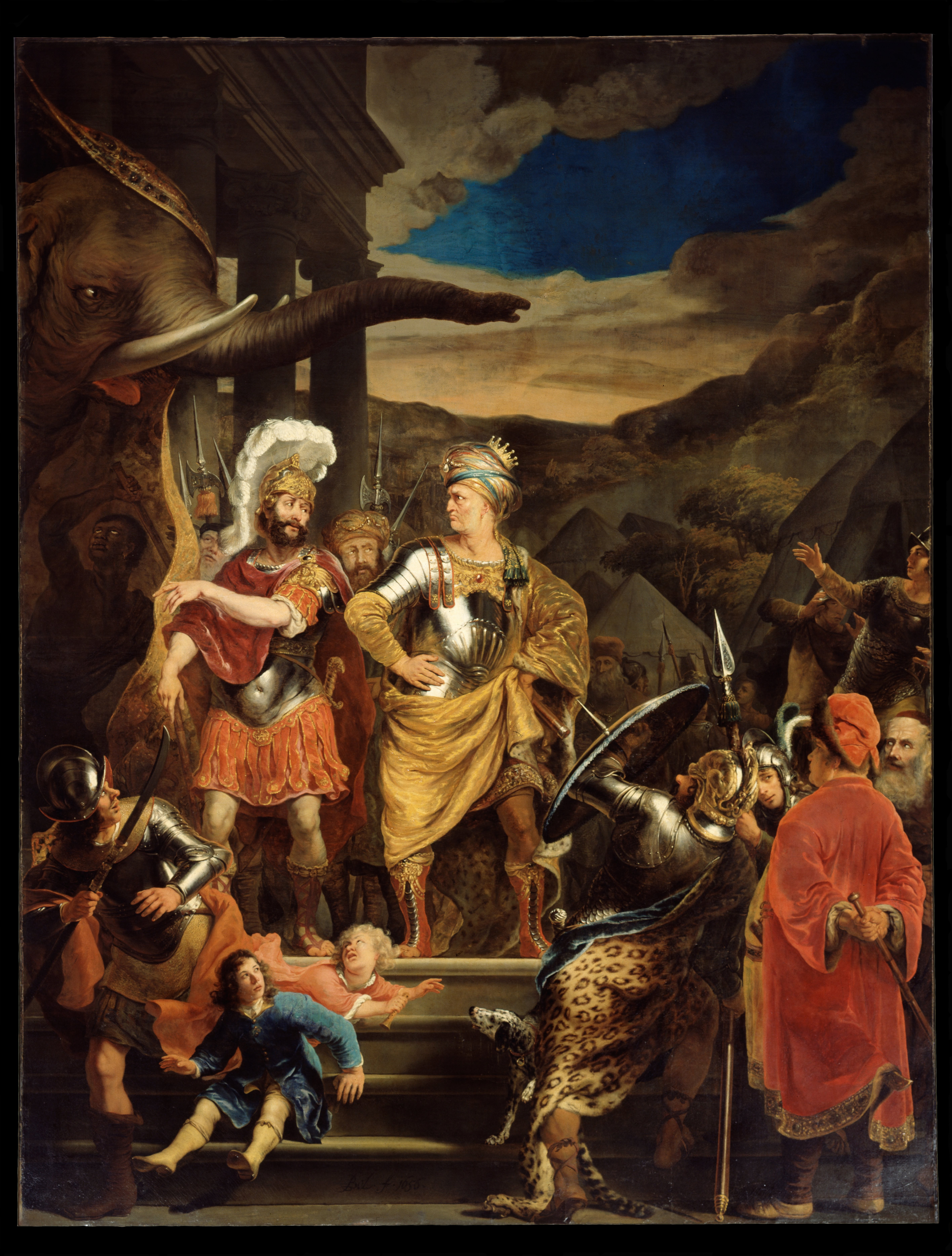
Fabricius negotiating with Pyrrhus after Heraclea (Ferdinand Bol, 1656 painting)

Gaius Fabricius Luscinus, son of Gaius, was said to have been the first of the Fabricii to move to ancient Rome, his family originating from Aletrium.

In 284 BC he was one of the ambassadors to Tarentum, successfully keeping peace, and was elected consul in 282 BC where he raised the siege of the Greek city Thurii from the Lucanians and Bruttians. After the Romans were defeated by Pyrrhus at Heraclea, Fabricius negotiated peace terms with Pyrrhus and perhaps the ransom and exchange of prisoners; Plutarch reports that Pyrrhus was impressed by his inability to bribe Fabricius, and released the prisoners even without a ransom. Fabricius was consul a second time in 278 BC, and once again successful against the Samnites, Lucanians and Bruttians. He also defeated Tarentum's army after Pyrrhus' departure from Italy to Sicily.

Fabricius was elected censor in 275 BC.

The people of Thurii honored Fabricius with a statue for helping them.

According to the Byzantine encyclopedia Suda, Pyrrhus admired and respected Fabricius for his unwavering moral integrity, praising him as a man whose virtue could not be swayed.

The tales of Fabricius are the standard ones of austerity and incorruptibility, similar to those told of Curius Dentatus, and Cicero often cites them together; it is difficult to make out a true personality behind the virtues. On the other hand, Valerius Maximus says that he and his co-consul/co-censor Quintus Aemilius Papus kept "silver in the[ir] homes... Each of them had a dish for the gods and a salt cellar, but Fabricius was more elegant because he chose to put a little pedestal of horn under his dish." [Valerius Maximus, Chapter Four "Poverty" 4.3]

In Boethius' Consolation of Philosophy, Fabricius is used in the poem of Bk. II, Ch. 7 as an example of a great man whose fame brought him no advantage, being either in heaven (and thus above earthly ambitions) or dead "body and soul", with the personified Philosophy asking, "Where now are the bones of staunch Fabricius?"

In the Purgatorio of Dante's Divine Comedy, Canto XX depicted Fabricius as an example of virtue opposing Avarice, as the Pilgrim and Virgil trek through the realm of Purgatory, also galvanizing the connection between poverty and asceticism. They say his principles were so deeply embedded within his character that he suffered intense impoverishment, and that he died a pauper and had to be buried by the state. A quote wailed by a mysterious voice in Canto XX 24-27 reveals this: "O Good Fabricius, you who chose to live with virtue in your poverty, rather than live in luxury with vice."

Political offices
Preceded by Publius Cornelius Dolabella and Gnaeus Domitius Calvinus Maximus	Consul of the Roman Republic with Quintus Aemilius Papus; 282 BC	Succeeded by Lucius Aemilius Barbula and Quintus Marcius Philippus
Preceded by Publius Sulpicius Saverrio and Publius Decius Mus	Consul of the Roman Republic with Quintus Aemilius Papus; 278 BC	Succeeded by Publius Cornelius Rufinus and Gaius Junius Bubulcus Brutus
