= Ager Gallicus =

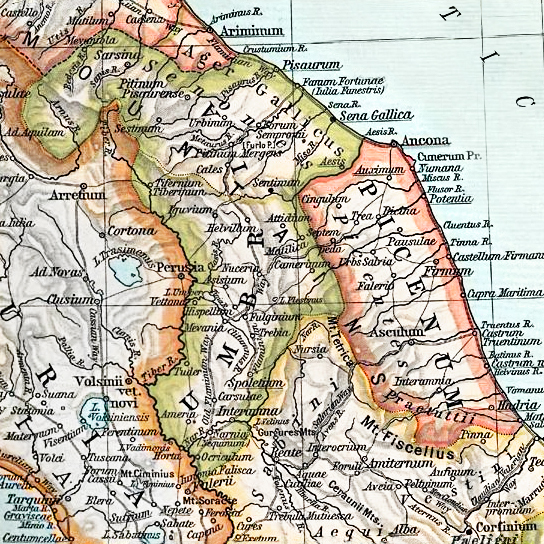
Map of Umbria and Picenum showing the location of the Ager Gallicus

The Ager Gallicus was the territory in northern Picenum that had been occupied by the Senone Gauls and was conquered by Rome between 284 and 282 BC, after the battles of the Lake Vadimon and Populonia.

The territory corresponds to the portion of the modern Marche region lying north of the Esino river, on the coast Adriatic Sea.

== History ==
In 283 BC unspecified Gauls besieged the city of Arretium (Arezzo, in north-eastern Tuscany) and defeated a Roman force which had come to the aid of the city. The subsequent actions are reported differently by Polybius and Appian. In any case the Romans then invaded the territory of the Senones, killed most of them, drove the rest out of the country.

The territory had earlier been part of Picenum but was then annexed by the Romans and became an ager publicus (Roman state land) and they made the town at Sena Gallica a colony.

In order to control the population and mercantile activities of the Ager, the Romans also founded the coastal colonies of Ariminum (Rimini), Pisaurum (Pesaro) and Fanum Fortunae (Fano). The administration of the inland was organized in 232 BC by the Lex Flaminia de agro Gallico et Piceno viritim dividendo, which created a network of prefectures (praefecturae), some of which, in the mid-1st century BC, were granted the status of municipia: Aesis (Iesi), Suasa, Ostra, and Forum Sempronii (Fossombrone).

The construction, in 220 BC, of the Via Flaminia shifted the relative position of the Ager, which was now connected to the seat of power by the consular road that traversed it along the Metauro river valley.

=== Later administrative organisation ===
After the Augustan administrative reorganization of the Italian peninsula, the Ager Gallicus was united with Umbria and became part of the Regio VI Umbria et Ager Gallicus.

The Diocletian reform of 300 AD split the Ager from Umbria, and combined with the Picenum to become the province Flaminia et Picenum.

Later, under emperor Theodosius I, the territory was split again (this time from Picenum, which became the province of Picenum Suburbicarium), and became part of the province of Flaminia et Picenum Annonarium. Some scholars see in this new name, which for the first time included the word "Picenum", as an acknowledgement (albeit belated) by Rome of the Italic people known as the Piceni, which had lived in the area between the 10th and 4th century BC.
