= Lake Vadimo =

Lake in Province of Viterbo, Italy

Coordinates: 42.4842°N 12.3232°E

Lake Vadimo (Lat. Lacus Vadimo) was a small, partially dry, lake of volcanic origin whose waters now are almost fully underground best known as the theatre for the battles between Etruscans and Romans in 310 and 283 BC, in both of which the Romans were victorious.

== Background ==
It is near the ancient Etruscan town of Horta (modern Orte) in the province of Viterbo, in the lower Tiber Valley, not far from Rome.

The Roman domination made the area a municipality of Horta (also Hortanum).

According to Pliny the Younger, there were floating islands on the lake.
