= Lucius Caecilius Metellus Denter =

Roman praetor and general, consul in 284 BC

Lucius Caecilius Metellus Denter was consul in 284 BC, and praetor the year after. In this capacity, he fell in the war against the Senones and was succeeded by Manius Curius Dentatus.

Fischer, in his Römische Zeittafeln, lists him as praetor and also as dying in 285 BC; however, the following year, he has him again as consul. Wilhelm Drumann denies the identity of the consul and the praetor, because it was not customary for a person to hold the praetorship the year after his consulship. Examples of such a mode of proceeding do occur, so Drumann's objection fails.

Denter may have been the father of Lucius Caecilius Metellus, consul in 251 and 247 BC. The latter's filiation is given as "L. f. C. n.", the son of Lucius and grandson of Gaius. In this case, Denter's father would have been Gaius Caecilius Metellus. An alternative hypothesis makes him the son or nephew of Quintus Caecilius, supposedly tribune of the plebs in 316 BC. No corresponding individual appears in The Magistrates of the Roman Republic or the Dictionary of Greek and Roman Biography and Mythology.

== See also ==
- Caecilia gens

== Footnotes ==
Political offices
Preceded by Gaius Claudius Canina; Marcus Aemilius Lepidus	Roman consul 284 BC with Gaius Servilius Tucca	Succeeded by Publius Cornelius Dolabella; Gnaeus Domitius Calvinus Maximus
