= Battle of Lake Vadimo (310 BC) =

Battle in 310 BC

- Part of the Samnite Wars
| Date | 310 BC |
| Location | Lake Vadimo, Italy 42°29′03″N 12°19′24″E |
| Result | Roman Victory |

Belligerents
| Roman Republic | Etruscans |

Commanders and leaders
| Quintus Fabius Maximus Rullianus | |
- Location within Italy

The first Battle of Lake Vadimo was fought in 310 BC between Rome and the Etruscans, and ended up being the largest battle between these nations. The Romans were victorious, gaining land and influence in the region. The Etruscans sustained heavy losses in the battle and would never again reclaim their previous glory.

== History ==
The Etruscans, outnumbering the Romans by a few hundred engaged them near the lake and enveloped them in a drawn out infantry brawl. Both sides fought each other to the death, and the reservists of both sides were called up. More heavy fighting continued throughout the day. By the afternoon both sides ran out of reserves, so they could not change their exhausted troops. The Roman cavalry was ordered to dismount and charged the Etruscans, routing their tired and battered infantry. By the end of the day the Etruscans were wiped out, and Roman military power in the area was assured. Of its significance, Livy writes, "That day broke, for the first time, the power of the Etruscans after their long-continued and abundant prosperity."

== See also ==
- Battle of Lake Vadimo (283 BC)
