= Publius Cornelius Dolabella (consul 283 BC) =

Roman consul in 283 BCE

Consul of the Roman Republic
- In office: 283 BC
- Colleague: Gn. Domitius Calvinus Maximus
- Preceded by: C. Servilius Tucca and L. Caecilius Metellus Denter
- Succeeded by: G. Fabricius Luscinus and Q. Aemilius Papus

Publius Cornelius Dolabella was a consul of the Roman Republic in 283 BC. He is best noted for having defeated a combined force of the Etruscans, and the Boii and the Senones, two of the Gallic tribes of northern Italy, at the Battle of Lake Vadimon of 283 BC. Appian named him the leader of the expedition which devastated the Ager Gallicus (the name the Romans gave to the land which had been conquered by the Senone Gauls) and expelled the Senones from their land. This episode was also recorded by Polybius. In Polybius' text this happened before the battle of Lake Vadimon. In Appian's text it is unclear and might have happened afterwards.

According to Appian, Dolabella was killed in 282 BC when the Tarentines attacked and sank a small fleet of triremes under the command of Admiral Lucius Valerius. He either drowned, or was taken prisoner and executed in the city.

Preceded by Gaius Servilius Tucca and Manius Curius Dentatus	Consul of the Roman Republic with Gnaeus Domitius Calvinus Maximus; 283 BC	Succeeded by Gaius Fabricius Luscinus and Quintus Aemilius Papus
