= Gnaeus Domitius Calvinus Maximus =

Gnaeus Domitius Calvinus Maximus was a consul of the Roman Republic in 283 BC.

== Biography ==
He became a candidate for the aedileship in 304 BC. He lost to Gnaeus Flavius. Five years later, however, he was elected. He was elevated to consul of the Roman Republic in 283 BC. He served with Publius Cornelius Dolabella.

Political offices
| Preceded by Gaius Servilius Tucca; Manius Curius Dentatus | Consul of the Roman Republic; 283 BC; With: Publius Cornelius Dolabella | Succeeded by Gaius Fabricius Luscinus; Quintus Aemilius Papus |
