= Boii (Cisalpine Gaul) =

Ancient Celtic people of northern Italy

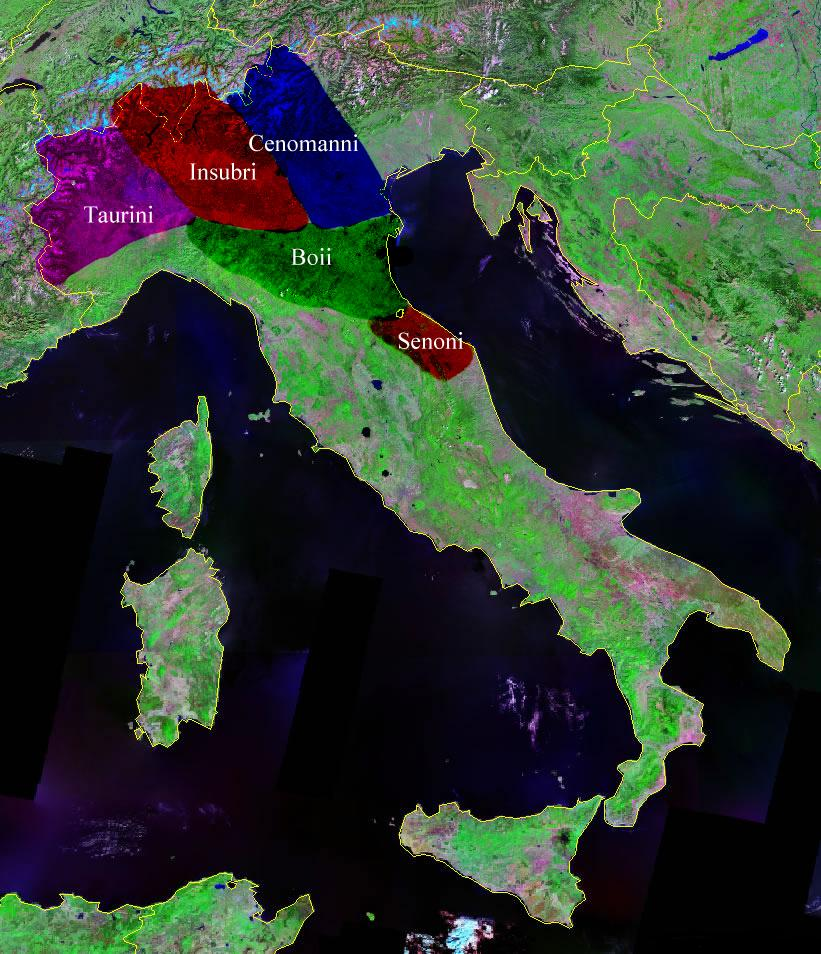
Celtic Peoples of Italy from the 3rd c. BC

The Boii (Latin: Boii, sing. Boius; Ancient Greek: Βοῖοι) were a Gallic people who settled south of the Po, between the river and the Apennines, in what is now Emilia-Romagna, from about the early 4th century BC. They formed part of the Celtic presence in Northern Italy that the Romans grouped together as the inhabitants of Gallia Cisalpina.

The Boii are known from Greek and Latin accounts of their long conflict with Rome and from their tombs in cemeteries in and near Bologna, Modena and Parma. They shared in a coalition crushed at the Battle of Telamon in 225 BC, allied with Hannibal during the Second Punic War, and destroyed a Roman army in the forest of Litana in 216 BC. Their resistance ended with defeat around 191 BC, and the Latin colony of Bononia (modern Bologna) was founded on their territory in 189 BC. The ancient tradition casts them as invaders who were afterwards expelled or destroyed. Modern scholarship treats the Boii less as a single tribe than as a cluster of communities, and doubts how far that narrative reflects what happened on the ground.

== Name ==
=== Attestations ===
The people are named as Βοῖοι (Boîoi) by Polybius in the 2nd century BC, as Boii by Livy in the late 1st century BC, as Βοῖοι by Strabo in the early 1st century AD, and as Boi by Pliny in the 1st century AD. The earliest surviving mention is a pun in Plautus in the early 2nd century BC, Boius est, boiam terit, which turns on Boius ('a Boian') and boia ('a fetter, a slave's collar').

The same ethnonym was carried by the Boii of central Europe, who gave their name to Boiohaemum (modern Bohemia), the Boii of Pannonia defeated by Burebista, the Boii of Gaul mentioned by Caesar, and by a people named Boiates in Aquitania. Whether the Cisalpine and the central European Boii were one people is uncertain.

=== Etymology ===
The etymology of Boii is unsettled. Xavier Delamarre records several competing derivations. One reading takes the name from an earlier bogios, giving a sense 'striker', which Delamarre regards as improbable on chronological grounds. A related proposition derives it from a root *bʰei(ə)- ('to strike'), and compares the runic baijaz ('warrior'), which would yield a sense 'the warriors'. A third connects it with a root *bʰei- ('to fear'), and interprets Boios as 'the fearsome'. A fourth links it with the word for cattle (*gʷoyjos) in the sense 'cattle-owner', which Delamarre judges doubtful because of the loss of the internal glide. (Note: Raimund Karl derives Boii from Proto-Celtic *bouios ('one who possesses cows'), so that in a cattle-reckoned economy a *bouios was a legally competent freeman, and the name first denoted an élite class rather than a tribe.) A fifth, proposed by Alfred Bammesberger, derives the name from a root *gʷei(ə)- ('to live'), giving a sense 'lively, active'.

== Geography ==
Tribes of Cisalpine Gaul 4th-3rd c BC

=== Territory ===
Boii territory lay between the Anares to the west and, in the 4th c. BC, the Lingones to the east, with the Senones beyond the Lingones toward the Adriatic coast. To the north, across the Po, were the Insubres and the Cenomani, and to the south rose the Apennines, beyond which lay Etruria and Umbria. Polybius lists these peoples from west to east as a topographical sequence rather than an exhaustive survey, and notes that smaller and less famous groups went unnamed. Livy gives the river Utens as the boundary between the Boii and the Senones.

=== Settlement and organisation ===
According to Cato, cited by Pliny, the Boii were made up of 112 tribus ('clans'). Polybius reports that the Cisalpine Gauls lived in unwalled villages, were occupied with war and farming, and reckoned their wealth in cattle and gold. For the Boian country, Daniele Vitali, following Christian Peyre, reads this as a dispersed rural settlement of villages and farmsteads, the vici, castella and tecta of Livy's narratives, with no single centre. Unlike the Insubres at Mediolanum and the Cenomani at Brixia, the Boii had no caput gentis. The Etruscan city of Felsina survived into this period, as its 4th- and 3rd-century cemeteries show, but in the sources it carries no strategic or political weight for the Boii, and no Boian army is recorded defending it. On this reading the Boian polity was less centralised than those of the Gauls north of the Po.

The place-name Bononia is itself Celtic, from bono-. Mutina (modern Modena) has been read as Celtic, 'the foggy [town]', by Patrizia de Bernardo Stempel, although it is more usually taken to be Etruscan. In the Apennines a network of fortified hilltop settlements has been identified, of which Monte Bibele, above the Idice valley, is the best known. These correspond to the castella of the literary sources.

== History ==
=== Origins and the Celtic settlement of the Po plain ===
Polybius and Livy describe a sudden Celtic seizure of the Po plain. In their account the newcomers drove the Etruscans, and with them the Umbri, out of the land beyond the Po and reduced neighbouring peoples to dependence. Livy names the Boii and the Lingones among them. The Boii are conventionally linked to the Gallic expedition against Rome of the early 4th century BC. (Note: Ancient writers place the assault on Rome in slightly different years, between 390 and 386 BC. Diodorus and Pliny instead date the start of the invasion to 396 BC, with the fall of the Etruscan city of Melpum to a coalition of Boii, Insubres and Senones on the same day that Camillus took Veii.)

Modern scholarship is cautious about this picture. Ralph Häussler, J. H. C. Williams and Wolfgang David hold that the Cisalpine Boii were probably not the outcome of a single large-scale invasion, but rather of repeated and gradual migration and infiltration over many generations, possibly including heterogeneous contingents. On this view the image of marauding invaders may have served to justify Rome's later conquest. Daniele Vitali points to Celtic speakers and to objects of Hallstatt and early La Tène type in the region well before the 4th century, which imply earlier contact and movement across the Alps. Ancient tradition held Bohemia to be the home of the Boii, and Venceslas Kruta has argued that the practice of cremation in the Cispadane cemeteries supports a southern Bohemian origin. Conversely, Vitali holds that warrior burial rites were shared by Celts, Picenes and Umbrians, so that funerary practice alone does not fix ethnicity. Häussler also cautions that funerary rite and material culture are unreliable markers of ethnic origin, and that ancient authors may have used the label Boii broadly for barbarian invaders. David likewise holds that the shared identity of the Boii took shape only in Cisalpine Gaul, and that the name may at first have been a collective label for the Celts of the region.

=== Wars with Rome ===
In the early 3rd century BC the Boii took part, alongside the Senones, in the coalition against Rome during the Roman–Etruscan Wars. It was crushed first at Sentinum in 295 BC and then at Lake Vadimon in 284 BC, after which the Boii were left isolated and exposed to Roman pressure. At Vadimon they fought beside the Etruscans, and after a further defeat they kept the peace with Rome for some forty-five years. In 238 BC a war faction among the Boii brought in Gaesatae mercenaries from the Rhône valley and marched them against Ariminum. The venture collapsed in internal fighting, and the two kings of the war party, Atis and Galatos, were killed by their opponents. (Note: Venceslas Kruta instead assigns the recruitment of Gaesatae from the Rhône to a slightly later episode, around 233 BC, under the kings Aneroestos and Concolitanos, and describes the appeal of 238 BC only as a call for transalpine contingents.)

In 225 BC the Boii joined a large coalition with the Insubres and the Taurisci, reinforced again by Gaesatae, and invaded Etruria. The allies were destroyed at the Battle of Telamon, where some 40,000 are said to have fallen. After Telamon the Boii made their first formal submission to Rome by treaty, so that their later operations against Rome were treated as acts of treachery. When Rome founded the colonies of Cremona and Placentia (modern Piacenza) on the Po in 218 BC, the Boii rose again. They ravaged the territory of Placentia and sent envoys, led by a king Magalos, to invite Hannibal across the Alps. On his arrival, before the Battle of the Trebia, they concluded an alliance with him, and with the Insubres they supplied much of the Gallic element of his army. In 216 BC the Boii ambushed and destroyed the army of the consul Lucius Postumius Albinus in the forest of Litana. Postumius was killed, and his skull is said to have been placed as a trophy in the chief Boian sanctuary, whose location is unknown.

After the Second Punic War, Rome reconquered the region in campaigns from 201 BC, with battles at Comum, Placentia and Mutina. The Boii, under kings named in the sources as Corolamos and Boiorix, were worn down, and their resistance ended with the victory of the consul Publius Cornelius Scipio Nasica around 191 BC.

=== Roman conquest and aftermath ===
Livy, reporting Nasica's request for a triumph, states that more than half of 50,000 Boii had been killed in battle and that only old men and boys remained. The colony of Bononia was founded in 189 BC on the site of Felsina, and was followed by Roman colonisation and centuriation along the Via Aemilia, with Parma and Mutina founded in 183 BC on land that had been the Boii's and earlier the Etruscans'. Strabo reports that some of the Boii recrossed the Alps and returned to central Europe.

Whether the Boii were really removed in their entirety is disputed. J. H. C. Williams notes that Rome took only about half their territory, that 1,500 of the Boian aristocracy had already surrendered in 192 BC, and that a substantial population is likely to have remained and to have been absorbed into the new colonial communities and the Latin-speaking population of the 2nd century. On this view the disappearance of the Boii from later surveys of the peoples of Italy reflects integration rather than extinction. Daniele Vitali likewise reads Livy's report that only old men and boys remained as a rhetorical exaggeration rather than a record of total expulsion.

== Material culture ==
The cemeteries long associated with the Boii are the western necropoleis of Bologna, explored in the later 19th century, together with sites at Marzabotto, Ceretolo and in the Modena district, to which the more recent excavations at Casalecchio di Reno, Monte Bibele and Monterenzio Vecchio have been added. About 200 graves were known until recently. The total now attributed to the Boii is reckoned at roughly 550, some eight times the figure for the Senones, but still far below what the size of the people would imply. At Casalecchio, the excavations of J. Ortalli uncovered about a hundred inhumations dated to the first half of the 4th century and the early 3rd century BC, of which only three contained weapons. The female graves were marked by pre-Duchcov and Duchcov fibulae, bracelets and torcs. The hilltop settlement of Monte Bibele, with its cemetery and a cult area, was occupied from the late 5th to the late 3rd or early 2nd century BC.

The Cispadane material reflects a mixed population rather than a single ethnic group. At the trading centres of Spina and Atria and at Monte Bibele, a Celtic element coexisted with a substratum of Etruscans and Umbrians, with Ligurians present in the Apennines. Grave goods and Etruscan inscriptions indicate that Celts and Etruscans lived together and intermarried at Spina, Atria, Monterenzio and Bononia. The funerary rite was not uniform, and the older equation of cremation with Cisalpine and inhumation with Transalpine populations has been questioned. Because objects of La Tène type travelled widely and were used as prestige goods across the region, the attribution of particular cemeteries or finds to the Boii, or to any one people, cannot be made with certainty. One feature held to distinguish the Boii from their neighbours is negative. Their women did not wear the torc usual among the Cenomani and the Senones, nor the ankle-rings of the Insubres, and they wore their bracelets asymmetrically, by preference on the left arm.
