= 140s =

Decade

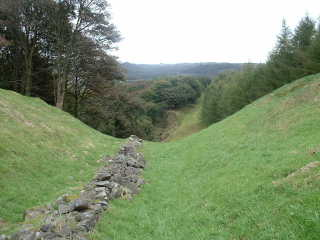
The Antonine Wall is ordered built in 142 and finished later this decade.

The 140s decade ran from January 1, 140, to December 31, 149.

== Events ==
=== By place ===
==== Roman Empire ====
- Emperor Antoninus Augustus Pius and Marcus Aurelius Caesar become Roman Consuls.
- Antoninus Pius recognizes the king of the Quadi, who becomes an ally of Rome.
- The export of olive oil from Hispania Baetica to Rome peaks.

==== Parthian Empire ====
- King Mithridates V dies; Vologases IV claims the throne and extends his rule throughout the Parthian Empire.

=== By topic ===
==== Religion ====
- Pope Pius I succeeds Pope Hyginus as the tenth pope of Rome according to tradition.
- Marcion arrives in Rome, bringing Evangelikon and Apostolikon to the Christian community.

==== Art and science ====
- Ptolemy completes his Almagest (approximate date).

=== By place ===
==== Roman Empire ====
- The Temple of Antoninus and Faustina is constructed in Rome; the temple is dedicated to Empress Faustina the Elder.

==== Asia ====
- Last (6th) year of Yonghe era of the Chinese Han Dynasty.
- The 141 Lycia earthquake affects most of the Roman provinces of Lycia and Caria and the islands of Rhodes, Kos, Simi and Serifos. It triggers a severe tsunami, which causes major inundation.

=== By topic ===
==== Religion ====
- Change of Patriarch of Constantinople from Felix of Byzantium to Polycarpus II of Byzantium.

==== Arts and Science ====
- 6th recorded perihelion passage of Halley's Comet.

=== By place ===
==== Roman Empire ====
- Emperor Antoninus Pius orders the construction of the Antonine Wall. The wall stretches 39 miles (63 km), from Old Kilpatrick in West Dunbartonshire on the Firth of Clyde, to Carriden near Bo'ness on the Firth of Forth (Scotland). The Romans build 19 forts and smaller fortlets (milecastles), to protect the border against the Caledonians.
- Municipal doctors are named throughout the Roman Empire.

==== Asia ====
- First year of the Hanan era of the Chinese Han Dynasty.
- The Chinese Taoist alchemist Wei Boyang, author of the Kinship of the Three, is the first to describe an early form of gunpowder solution.

=== By topic ===
==== Religion ====
- Marcion proclaims that the Old Testament is incompatible with Christianity.

=== 143 ===
- Antoninus Pius serves as Roman Consul.
- A revolt of the Brigantes tribe in Britannia is suppressed by Quintus Lollius Urbicus.

=== By topic ===
==== Medicine ====
- The Roman doctor Antyllus performs the first arteriotomy.

=== By place ===
==== Roman Empire ====
- Lucius Hedius Rufus Lollianus Avitus and Titus Statilius Maximus become Roman Consuls.
- The Roman campaigns in Mauretania begin.

==== Asia ====
- Change of era name from Hanan (3rd year) to Jiankang era of the Chinese Han dynasty.
- Change of emperor from Han Shundi to Han Chongdi of the Han dynasty.
- In Vietnam during the second Era of Northern Domination, rebellion of Cham people broke out in Jiaozhi and Jiuzhen. The rebels then surrendered to the Jiaozhi's governor in the same year.
- Reign of Huvishka, emperor of the Kushan Empire.

=== By topic ===
==== Religion ====
- Change of Patriarch of Constantinople from Polycarpus II to Athendodorus (until 148).
- Marcion of Sinope is excommunicated; a sect, Marcionism, grows out of his beliefs.

=== By place ===
==== Roman Empire ====
- Antoninus Augustus Pius and Marcus Aurelius Caesar become Roman Consuls.
- Marcus Aurelius marries Faustina the Younger, the daughter of Antoninus Pius.
- Arrian becomes archon in Athens.

==== Asia ====
- Change of emperor from Han Chongdi to Han Zhidi of the Chinese Han dynasty.

=== By place ===
==== Roman Empire ====
- Faustina the Younger is given the title Augusta, and becomes Roman Empress.
- Marcus Aurelius receives the imperium proconsular.

==== Asia ====
- Change of era name from Yongxi (1st year) to Benchu era of the Chinese Han dynasty.
- Han Huandi succeeds Han Zhidi as emperor of the Chinese Han dynasty.
- Chadae becomes ruler of the Korean kingdom of Goguryeo.

=== By place ===
==== Roman Empire ====
- Marcus Aurelius receives imperial powers, from Emperor Antoninus Pius.
- Festivals to celebrate the 900th anniversary of the founding of Rome begin.

==== Parthian Empire ====
- King Vologases III dies after a 42-year reign, in which he has contended successfully with his rivals.
- King Vologases IV, son of Mithridates V of Parthia, unites the Parthian Empire under his rule.

==== Asia ====
- First year of Jianhe of the Chinese Han Dynasty.

=== By place ===
==== Roman Empire ====
- Emperor Antoninus Pius hosts a series of grand games, to celebrate Rome's 900th anniversary.

==== Asia ====
- An Shigao arrives in China.

=== By topic ===
==== Religion ====
- Euzois succeeds Athendodorus, as Patriarch of Constantinople.

== Significant people ==
- Antoninus Pius, Roman Emperor (138–161)

== Births ==
140

- Ballomar, leader of the Marcomanni (approximate date)
- Zhang Jiao, leader of the Yellow Turban Rebellion (d. 184)

141

- Cheng Yu, Chinese politician and court advisor (d. 220)
- Ummidia Cornificia Faustina, Roman noblewoman (d. 182)

142

- Papinian, Roman jurist and praetorian prefect (d. 212)
- Elpinice, Roman noblewoman (d. 165)
- Liu Biao, Chinese governor (d. 208)

143

- Athenais, Roman noblewoman (d. 161)
- Chong of Han, Chinese emperor (d. 145)

144

- Kahiko-Lue-Mea, Hawaiian ruler

145

- April 11 – Septimius Severus, Roman emperor (d. 211)

146

- Guo Si (or Guo Duo), Chinese general (d. 197)

147

- Annia Galeria Aurelia Faustina, daughter of Marcus Aurelius (approximate date)
- Jia Xu (or Wenhe), Chinese official and adviser (d. 223)
- Lokaksema, Kushan Buddhist monk and traveler (d. 189)

148

- Xun Yue (or Zhongyu), Chinese official and historian (d. 209)

149

- Sima Fang (or Jiangong), Chinese official and scholar of the Han Dynasty (d. 219)

== Deaths ==
140

- Faustina the Elder, Roman empress (b. 100 AD)
- Gaius Bruttius Praesens Lucius Fulvius Rusticus, Roman politician (b. AD 68)
- Menelaus of Alexandria, Greek mathematician (b. AD 70)
- Mithridates V, king of the Parthian Empire

141

- Faustina the Elder, Roman empress (b. c. AD 100)
- Philo of Byblos, Phoenician historical writer (b. AD 64)

142

- Hyginus, bishop of Rome (approximate date)

143

- Cui Yuan, Chinese politician and poet
- Venera, Roman Christian saint (b. c. 100)

144

- September 20 – Han Shundi, Chinese emperor (b. 115)
- Polemon of Laodicea, Greek sophist (b. c. AD 90)

145

- Han Chongdi, Chinese emperor of the Han dynasty (b. 143)

146

- Han Zhidi, Chinese emperor of the Han dynasty (b. 138)
- Sextus Erucius Clarus, Roman politician

147

- Li Gu, Chinese scholar and official (b. AD 93)
- Vologases III, king of the Parthian Empire
- Xu Shen, Chinese politician and writer (b. AD 58)

148

- Athendodorus, Patriarch of Constantinople.
