= 3rd century =

One hundred years, from 201 to 300

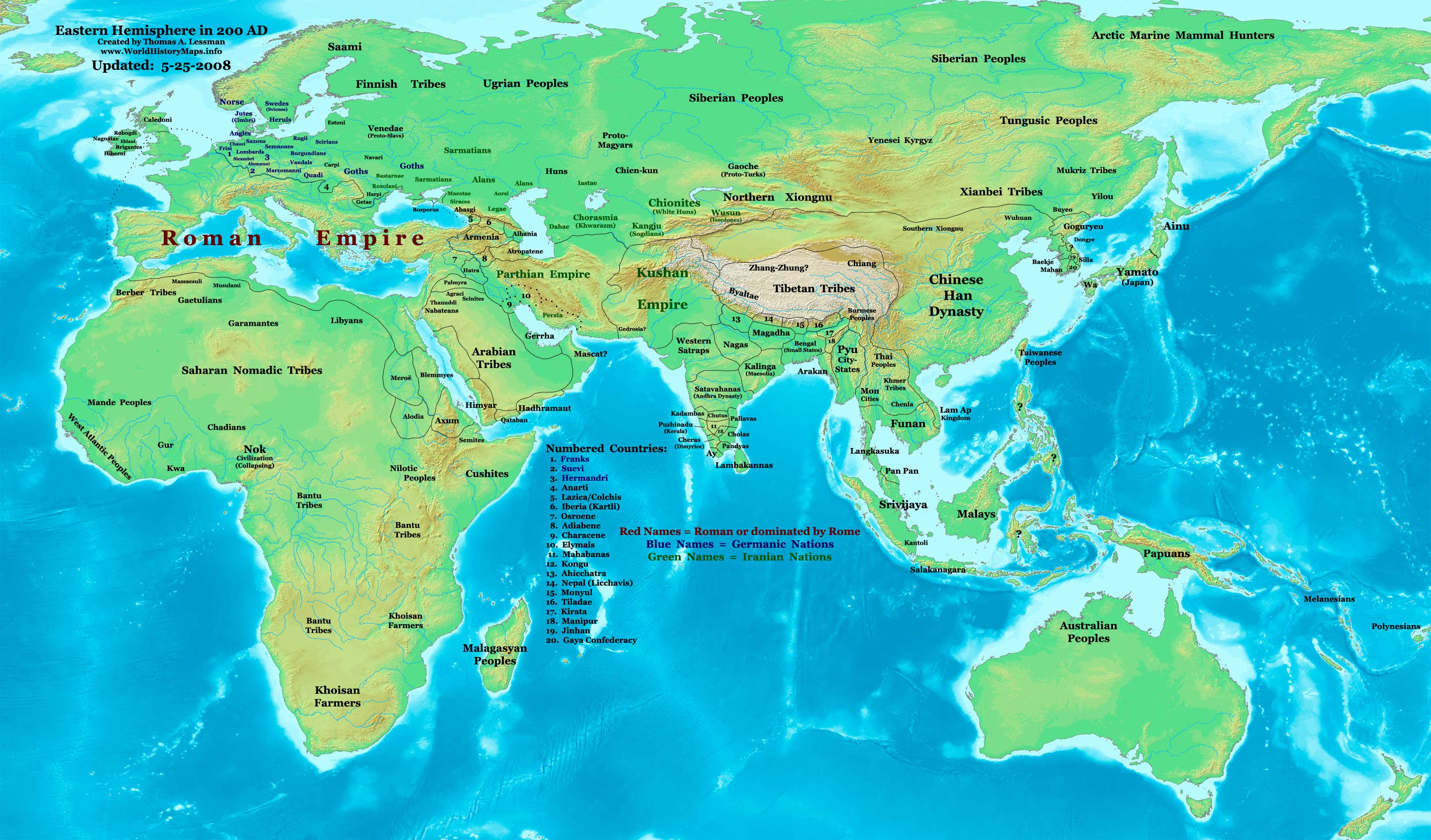
Eastern Hemisphere at the beginning of the 3rd century AD.

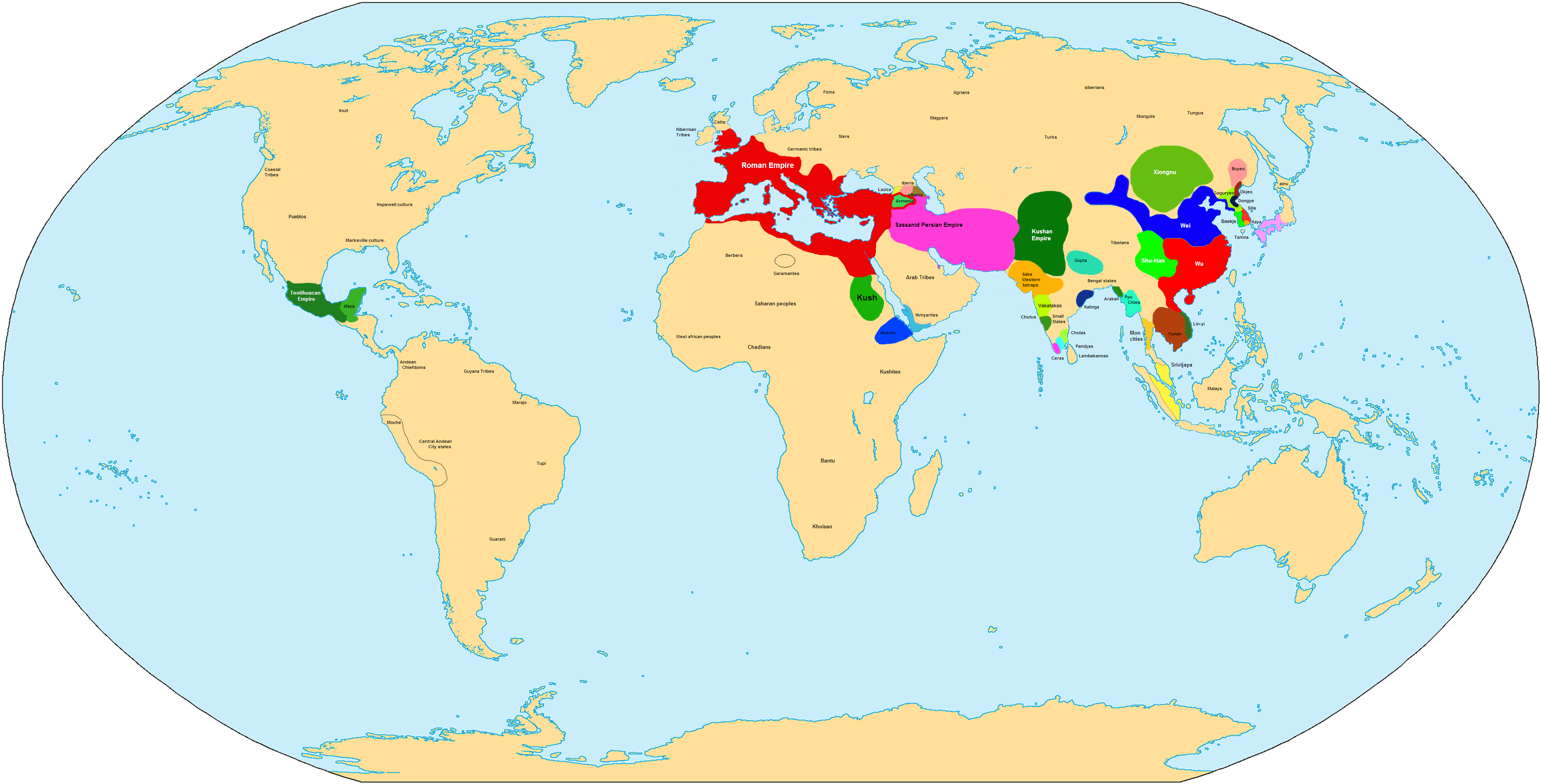
Map of the world in AD 250.

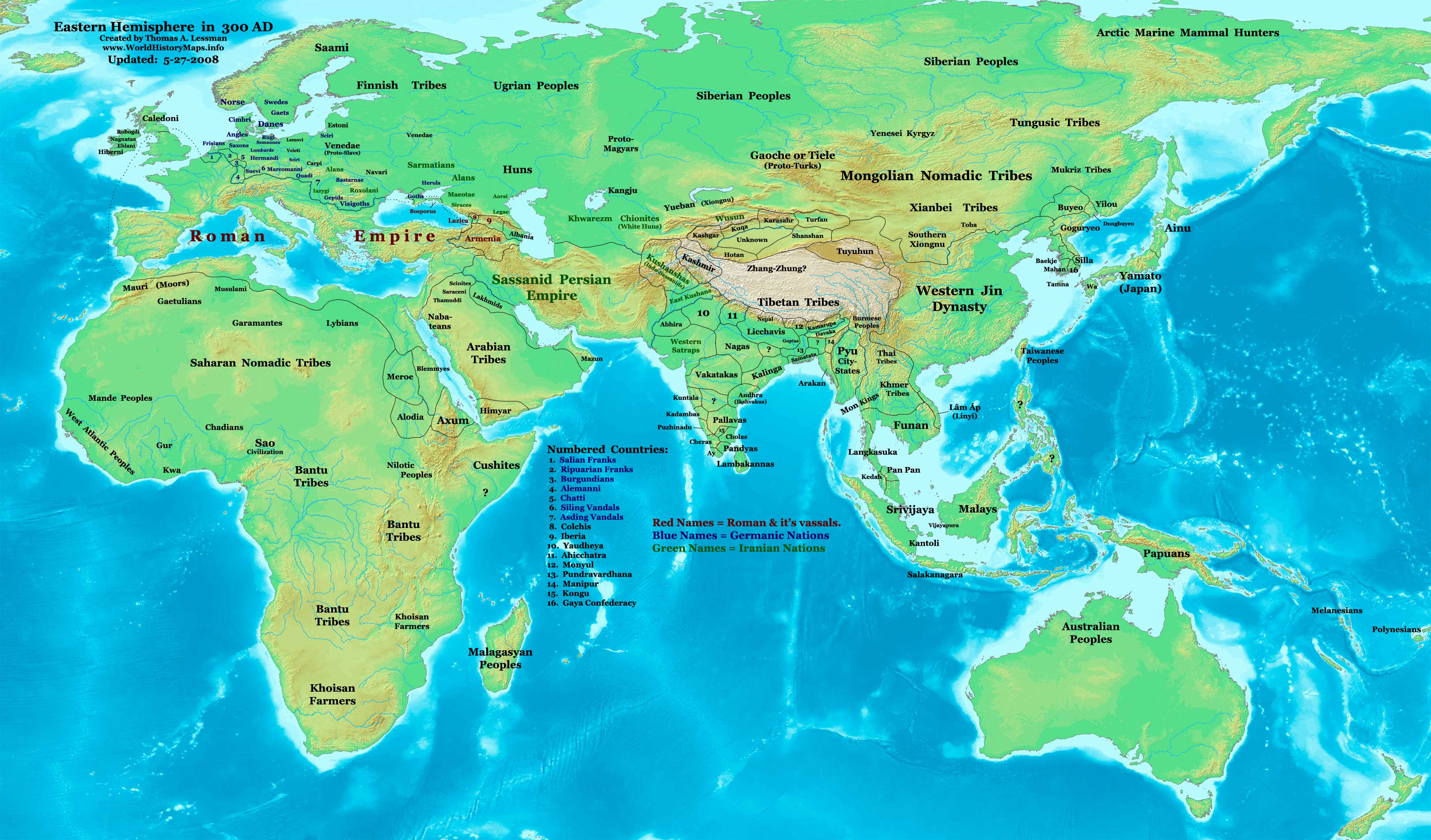
Eastern Hemisphere at the end of the 3rd century AD.

The 3rd century was the period from AD 201 (represented by the Roman numerals CCI) to AD 300 (CCC) in accordance with the Julian calendar.

In this century, the Roman Empire saw a crisis, starting with the assassination of the Roman Emperor Severus Alexander in 235, plunging the empire into a period of economic troubles, barbarian incursions, political upheavals, civil wars, and the split of the Roman Empire through the Gallic Empire in the west and the Palmyrene Empire in the east, which all together threatened to destroy the Roman Empire in its entirety, but the reconquests of the seceded territories by Emperor Aurelian and the stabilization period under Emperor Diocletian due to the administrative strengthening of the empire caused an end to the crisis by 284. This crisis would also mark the beginning of Late Antiquity. While in North Africa, Roman rule continued with growing Christian influence, particularly in the region of Carthage.

In Persia, the Parthian Empire was succeeded by the Sassanid Empire in 224 after Ardashir I defeated and killed Artabanus V during the Battle of Hormozdgan. The Sassanids then went on to subjugate many of the western portions of the declining Kushan Empire. In Africa the most significant event was the rise of the Aksumite Empire in what is now Ethiopia, which experienced significant military expansion and became a major trading hub in northeast Africa.

In China, the chaos that had been raging since 189 would ultimately continue to persist with the decisive defeat of Cao Cao at the Battle of Red Cliffs in 208, which would increasingly end the hopes of unification and lead to the tripartite division of China into three main empires; Shu, Wu, and Wei, colloquially known as the Three Kingdoms period, which started in 220 with the formal abdication of Emperor Xian of Han to Cao Cao's son, Cao Pi, thereby founding Wei, which would go on to conquer Shu in 263, but would ultimately be united again under the Jin dynasty, headed by the Sima clan, who would usurp Wei in 266, and conquer Wu in 280.

In other parts of the world, Korea was ruled by the Three Kingdoms of Korea, Japan entered the Kofun period and the Southeast Asian mainland was mostly dominated by Funan, the first kingdom of the Khmer people. In India, the Gupta Empire was on the rise towards the end of the century. In Pre-Columbian America, the Adena culture of the Ohio River valley declined in favor of the Hopewell culture. The Maya civilization entered its Classic Era.

== Roman Empire ==
After the death of Commodus in the late previous century the Roman Empire was plunged into a civil war. When the dust settled, Septimius Severus emerged as emperor, establishing the Severan dynasty. Unlike previous emperors, he openly used the army to back his authority, and paid them well to do so. The regime he created is known as the Military Monarchy as a result. The system fell apart in the 230s, giving way to a fifty-year period known as the Military Anarchy or the Crisis of the Third Century, following the assassination of the 28-year-old emperor Severus Alexander (the last emperor of the Severan dynasty), where no fewer than twenty emperors held the reins of power, most for only a few months. The majority of these men were assassinated, or killed in battle, and the empire almost collapsed under the weight of the political upheaval, as well as the growing Persian threat in the east. Under its new Sassanid rulers, Persia had grown into a rival superpower, and the Romans would have to make drastic reforms in order to better prepare their state for a confrontation. These reforms were finally realized late in the century under the reign of Diocletian, one of them being to divide the empire into an eastern and western half, and have a separate ruler for each.

== Events ==
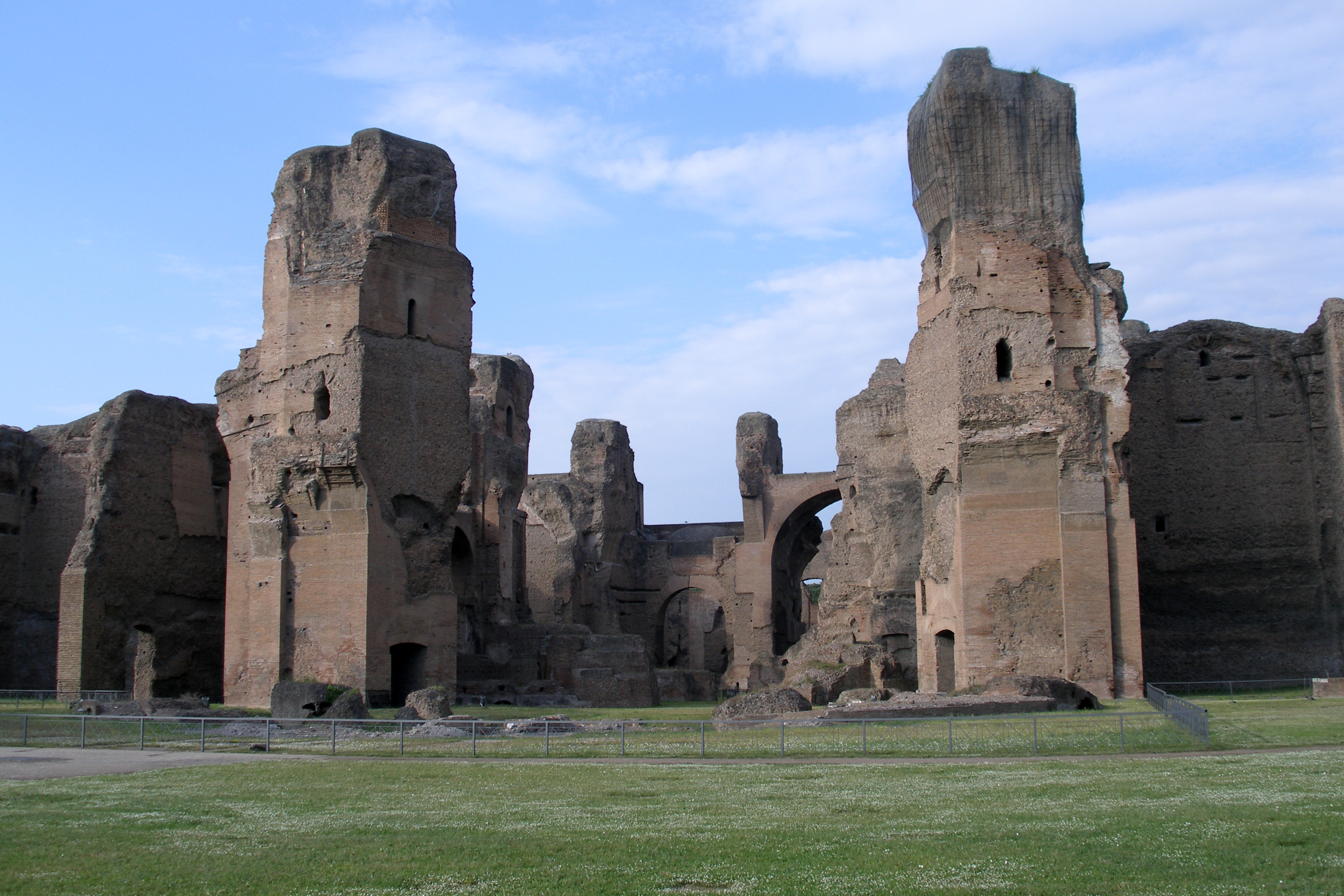
The Baths of Caracalla

- The Kingdom of Funan reaches its zenith.
- The Goths move from Gothiscandza to Ukraine, giving birth to the Chernyakhov culture.
- Menorahs and Ark of the Covenant, wall painting in a Jewish catacomb, Villa Torlonia, Rome, are made.
- The Coptic period begins.
- Siddhartha in the Palace, detail of a relief from Nagarjunakonda, Andhra Pradesh, India, is made. Now kept at National Museum, New Delhi.
- Two statuettes, Jonah Swallowed and Jonah Cast Up, of a group from the eastern Mediterranean, probably Asia Minor, are made. Now kept at The Cleveland Museum of Art, Ohio.
- The Magerius Mosaic is made. Now kept at the Sousse Archaeological Museum, Tunisia.
- Early 3rd century: Burial in catacombs becomes commonplace.
- 208: the Chinese naval Battle of Red Cliffs occurs.
- 211–217: Caracalla, Roman Emperor.
- 212: Constitutio Antoniniana grants citizenship to all free Roman men.
- 212–217: Baths of Caracalla.
- 220: The Han dynasty comes to an end with establishment of the Three Kingdoms in ancient China.
- 220–280: The Three Kingdoms period.
- 222–235: Alexander Severus, Roman Emperor.
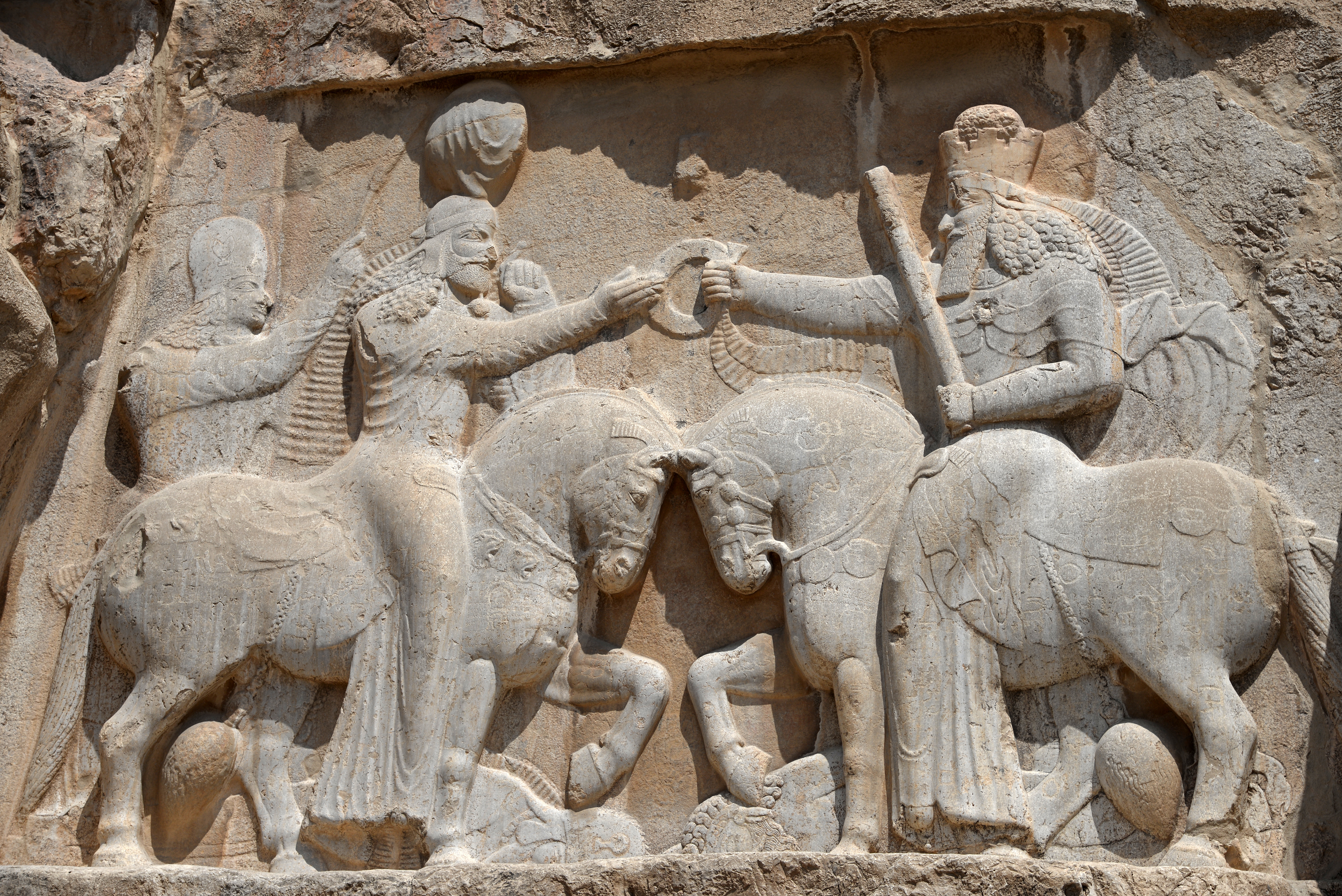
  Rock relief of Ardashir I receiving the ring of kingship by the Zoroastrian supreme god Ahura Mazda.
- 224: Ardashir I of the Sassanid dynasty conquers the Parthian empire at the Battle of Hormozdgan.
- 230–232: Sassanid dynasty of Persia launches a war to reconquer lost lands in the Roman east.
- 234: Zhuge Liang dies of illness at the standoff of Wuzhang Plains.
- 235–284: Crisis of the Third Century shook the Roman Empire.
- 241: The Kingdom of Hatra dissolved after the Fall of Hatra to Persia
- 242–274: Mani preaches Manichaeism at the Sasanian court.
- 244: Battle of Xingshi in China.
- 258: Valerian's massacre of Christians.
- 260: Roman Emperor Valerian I is taken captive by Shapur I of Persia.
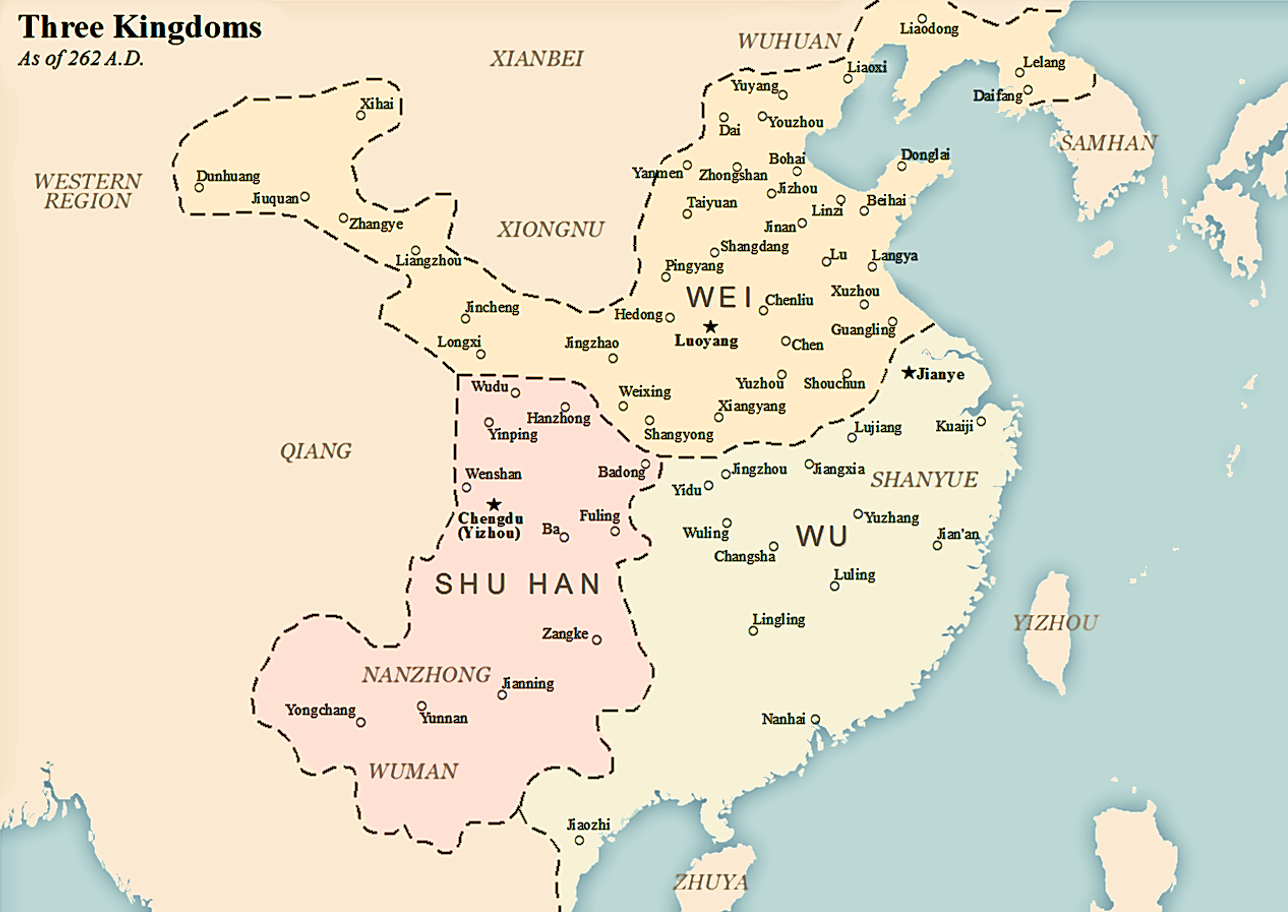
  Political map of China in 262 AD
- 263: Cao Wei conquers the Shu Han Kingdom.
- 266: The Jin dynasty is founded after the overthrow of the Cao Wei dynasty by Sima Yan.
- 280: The Jin dynasty reunites China under one empire after the conquest of Eastern Wu.
- 284–305: Diocletian, Roman Emperor.
- 291–306: The War of the Eight Princes, a civil war by the Sima Clan in China.
- 293: Emperor Diocletian forms the Tetrarchy in Rome.
- 300–538: Kofun era, the first part of the Kofun period in Japan.
- Late 3rd century – early 4th century: Good Shepherd, Orants and Story of Jonah, painted ceiling of the Catacombs of Marcellinus and Peter in Rome, is made.

== Inventions, discoveries, introductions ==
- Sarnath becomes a center of Buddhist arts in India.
- Diffusion of maize as a food crop from Mexico into North America begins.
