= AD 198 =

198 in various calendars
- Gregorian calendar: 198; CXCVIII
- Ab urbe condita: 951
- Assyrian calendar: 4948
- Balinese saka calendar: 119–120
- Bengali calendar: −396 – −395
- Berber calendar: 1148
- Buddhist calendar: 742
- Burmese calendar: −440
- Byzantine calendar: 5706–5707
- Chinese calendar: 丁丑年 (Fire Ox); 2895 or 2688 — to — 戊寅年 (Earth Tiger); 2896 or 2689
- Coptic calendar: −86 – −85
- Discordian calendar: 1364
- Ethiopian calendar: 190–191
- Hebrew calendar: 3958–3959
- Hindu calendars
- Vikram Samvat: 254–255
- Shaka Samvat: 119–120
- Kali Yuga: 3298–3299
- Holocene calendar: 10198
- Iranian calendar: 424 BP – 423 BP
- Islamic calendar: 437 BH – 436 BH
- Javanese calendar: 75–76
- Julian calendar: 198; CXCVIII
- Korean calendar: 2531
- Minguo calendar: 1714 before ROC 民前1714年
- Nanakshahi calendar: −1270
- Seleucid era: 509/510 AG
- Thai solar calendar: 740–741
- Tibetan calendar: མེ་མོ་གླང་ལོ་ (female Fire-Ox); 324 or −57 or −829 — to — ས་ཕོ་སྟག་ལོ་ (male Earth-Tiger); 325 or −56 or −828

Year 198 (CXCVIII) was a common year starting on Sunday of the Julian calendar. At the time, it was known as the Year of the Consulship of Sergius and Gallus (or, less frequently, year 951 Ab urbe condita). The denomination 198 for this year has been used since the early medieval period, when the Anno Domini calendar era became the prevalent method in Europe for naming years.

== Events ==
=== By place ===
==== Roman Empire ====
- January 28
  - Publius Septimius Geta, son of Septimius Severus, receives the title of Caesar.
  - Caracalla, son of Septimius Severus, is given the title of Augustus.

==== China ====
- Winter – Battle of Xiapi: The allied armies led by Cao Cao and Liu Bei defeat Lü Bu; afterward Cao Cao has him executed.

=== By topic ===
==== Religion ====
- Marcus I succeeds Olympianus as Patriarch of Constantinople (until 211).

== Births ==
- Lu Kai, Chinese official and general (d. 269)
- Quan Cong, Chinese general and advisor (d. 249)

== Deaths ==
- Li Jue, Chinese warlord and regent
- Liu Yao, Chinese governor and warlord (b. 157)
- Mi Heng, Chinese musician and writer (b. 173)
- Zhang Yang, Chinese official and warlord
