= AD 153 =

153 in various calendars
- Gregorian calendar: 153; CLIII
- Ab urbe condita: 906
- Assyrian calendar: 4903
- Balinese saka calendar: 74–75
- Bengali calendar: −441 – −440
- Berber calendar: 1103
- Buddhist calendar: 697
- Burmese calendar: −485
- Byzantine calendar: 5661–5662
- Chinese calendar: 壬辰年 (Water Dragon); 2850 or 2643 — to — 癸巳年 (Water Snake); 2851 or 2644
- Coptic calendar: −131 – −130
- Discordian calendar: 1319
- Ethiopian calendar: 145–146
- Hebrew calendar: 3913–3914
- Hindu calendars
- Vikram Samvat: 209–210
- Shaka Samvat: 74–75
- Kali Yuga: 3253–3254
- Holocene calendar: 10153
- Iranian calendar: 469 BP – 468 BP
- Islamic calendar: 483 BH – 482 BH
- Javanese calendar: 28–29
- Julian calendar: 153; CLIII
- Korean calendar: 2486
- Minguo calendar: 1759 before ROC 民前1759年
- Nanakshahi calendar: −1315
- Seleucid era: 464/465 AG
- Thai solar calendar: 695–696
- Tibetan calendar: ཆུ་ཕོ་འབྲུག་ལོ་ (male Water-Dragon); 279 or −102 or −874 — to — ཆུ་མོ་སྦྲུལ་ལོ་ (female Water-Snake); 280 or −101 or −873

Year 153 (CLIII) was a common year starting on Sunday of the Julian calendar. At the time, it was known as the Year of the Consulship of Rusticus and Rufinus (or, less frequently, year 906 Ab urbe condita). The denomination 153 for this year has been used since the early medieval period, when the Anno Domini calendar era became the prevalent method in Europe for naming years.

== Events ==
=== By place ===
==== Roman Empire ====
- Minor uprisings occur in Roman Egypt against Roman rule.

==== Asia ====
- Change of era name from Yuanjia (3rd year) to Yongxing of the Chinese Han dynasty.

== Births ==
- Didia Clara, daughter of Didius Julianus
- Kong Rong, Chinese official and warlord (d. 208)
- Zhang Hong, Chinese official and politician (d. 212)

== Deaths ==
- Tiberius Julius Rhoemetalces, Roman client king
