= From the Back Window – 291 =

Photograph by Alfred Stieglitz

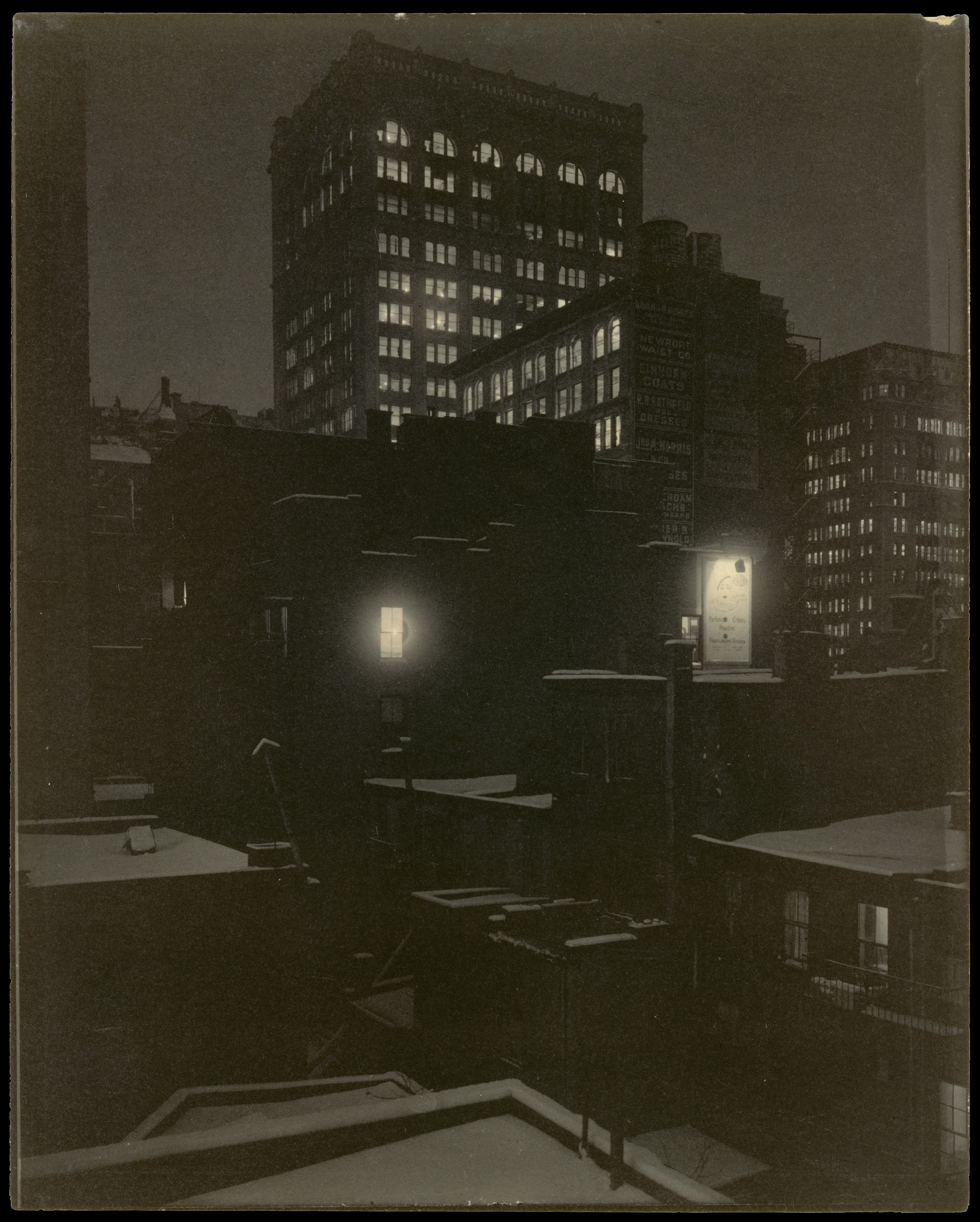
From the Back Window – 291 (1915) by Alfred Stieglitz

From the Back Window – 291 is a black and white photograph taken by Alfred Stieglitz in 1915. The picture was taken at night from a back window of his 291 gallery in New York. Its one of the several that he took that year from that window, including at a snowy Winter.

== Description ==
The night photograph depicts an urban cityscape of New York. The reigning darkness is leavened by several sources of artificial light. The background building is the 105 Madison Avenue, at the southeast corner of Madison and 30th Street, while the smaller building with the advertisements is 112 Madison Avenue.

Stieglitz seems to have taken inspiration from a recent exhibition of Cubist painters Pablo Picasso and Georges Braque at the 291 gallery, which would explain his interest in the geometrical forms and lines, but also of the 19th century photographers, like David Octavius Hill. He wrote then to R. Child Bailey: "I have done quite some photography recently. It is intensely direct. Portraits. Buildings from my back window at 291, a whole series of them, a few landscapes and interiors. All interrelated. I know nothing outside of Hill's work which I think is so direct, and quite so intensely honest." The picture also seems still reminiscent of pictorialism, while being more in the straight photography style."

== Public collections ==
There are prints of this photograph at several public collections, including the Metropolitan Museum of Art, in New York, the National Gallery of Art, in Washington, D.C., the Museum of Fine Arts, Boston, and at the Williams College Museum of Art, in Williamstown, Massachusetts.
