= AD 143 =

143 in various calendars
- Gregorian calendar: 143; CXLIII
- Ab urbe condita: 896
- Assyrian calendar: 4893
- Balinese saka calendar: 64–65
- Bengali calendar: −451 – −450
- Berber calendar: 1093
- Buddhist calendar: 687
- Burmese calendar: −495
- Byzantine calendar: 5651–5652
- Chinese calendar: 壬午年 (Water Horse); 2840 or 2633 — to — 癸未年 (Water Goat); 2841 or 2634
- Coptic calendar: −141 – −140
- Discordian calendar: 1309
- Ethiopian calendar: 135–136
- Hebrew calendar: 3903–3904
- Hindu calendars
- Vikram Samvat: 199–200
- Shaka Samvat: 64–65
- Kali Yuga: 3243–3244
- Holocene calendar: 10143
- Iranian calendar: 479 BP – 478 BP
- Islamic calendar: 494 BH – 493 BH
- Javanese calendar: 18–19
- Julian calendar: 143; CXLIII
- Korean calendar: 2476
- Minguo calendar: 1769 before ROC 民前1769年
- Nanakshahi calendar: −1325
- Seleucid era: 454/455 AG
- Thai solar calendar: 685–686
- Tibetan calendar: ཆུ་ཕོ་རྟ་ལོ་ (male Water-Horse); 269 or −112 or −884 — to — ཆུ་མོ་ལུག་ལོ་ (female Water-Sheep); 270 or −111 or −883

Year 143 (CXLIII) was a common year starting on Monday of the Julian calendar. At the time, it was known as the Year of the Consulship of Torquatus and Hipparchus (or, less frequently, year 896 Ab urbe condita). The denomination 143 for this year has been used since the early medieval period, when the Anno Domini calendar era became the prevalent method in Europe for naming years.

== Events ==
=== By place ===
==== Roman Empire ====
- Antoninus Pius serves as Roman Consul.
- A revolt of the Brigantes tribe in Britannia is suppressed by Quintus Lollius Urbicus.

=== By topic ===
==== Medicine ====
- The Roman doctor Antyllus performs the first arteriotomy.

== Births ==
- Athenais, Roman noblewoman (d. 161)
- Chong of Han, Chinese emperor (d. 145)

== Deaths ==
- Cui Yuan, Chinese politician and poet
- Venera, Roman Christian saint (b. c. 100)
