= AD 173 =

173 in various calendars
- Gregorian calendar: 173; CLXXIII
- Ab urbe condita: 926
- Assyrian calendar: 4923
- Balinese saka calendar: 94–95
- Bengali calendar: −421 – −420
- Berber calendar: 1123
- Buddhist calendar: 717
- Burmese calendar: −465
- Byzantine calendar: 5681–5682
- Chinese calendar: 壬子年 (Water Rat); 2870 or 2663 — to — 癸丑年 (Water Ox); 2871 or 2664
- Coptic calendar: −111 – −110
- Discordian calendar: 1339
- Ethiopian calendar: 165–166
- Hebrew calendar: 3933–3934
- Hindu calendars
- Vikram Samvat: 229–230
- Shaka Samvat: 94–95
- Kali Yuga: 3273–3274
- Holocene calendar: 10173
- Iranian calendar: 449 BP – 448 BP
- Islamic calendar: 463 BH – 462 BH
- Javanese calendar: 49–50
- Julian calendar: 173; CLXXIII
- Korean calendar: 2506
- Minguo calendar: 1739 before ROC 民前1739年
- Nanakshahi calendar: −1295
- Seleucid era: 484/485 AG
- Thai solar calendar: 715–716
- Tibetan calendar: ཆུ་ཕོ་བྱི་བ་ལོ་ (male Water-Rat); 299 or −82 or −854 — to — ཆུ་མོ་གླང་ལོ་ (female Water-Ox); 300 or −81 or −853

Year 173 (CLXXIII) was a common year starting on Thursday of the Julian calendar. At the time, it was known as the Year of the Consulship of Severus and Pompeianus (or, less frequently, year 926 Ab urbe condita). The denomination 173 for this year has been used since the early medieval period, when the Anno Domini calendar era became the prevalent method in Europe for naming years.

== Events ==
=== By place ===
==== Roman Empire ====
- Gnaeus Claudius Severus and Tiberius Claudius Pompeianus become Roman Consuls.
- Given control of the Eastern Empire, Avidius Cassius, the governor of Syria, crushes an insurrection of shepherds known as the Boukoloi.

== Births ==
- Maximinus Thrax ("the Thracian"), Roman emperor (d. 238)
- Mi Heng, Chinese writer and musician (d. 198)

== Deaths ==
- Donatus of Muenstereifel, Roman soldier and martyr (b. AD 140)
