= Cyriacus I of Byzantium =

Bishop of Byzantium from 217 to 230

- Bishop of Byzantium
- Installed: 217
- Term ended: 230
- Predecessor: Philadelphus of Byzantium
- Successor: Castinus of Byzantium

Personal details
- Died: 230
- Denomination: Early Christianity

Cyriacus I of Byzantium (Greek: Κυριακός; died 230) succeeded Philadelphus of Byzantium as bishop of Byzantium and governed the local church for 13 years (217 – 230); in some catalogues appears under the name Cyrillianus or Kyriacos.

== Bibliography ==
- Οικουμενικό Πατριαρχείο.

Titles of the Great Christian Church
Preceded by Philadelphus	Bishop of Byzantium; 217 – 230	Succeeded by Castinus
