= 265 =

265 in various calendars
- Gregorian calendar: 265; CCLXV
- Ab urbe condita: 1018
- Assyrian calendar: 5015
- Balinese saka calendar: 186–187
- Bengali calendar: −329 – −328
- Berber calendar: 1215
- Buddhist calendar: 809
- Burmese calendar: −373
- Byzantine calendar: 5773–5774
- Chinese calendar: 甲申年 (Wood Monkey); 2962 or 2755 — to — 乙酉年 (Wood Rooster); 2963 or 2756
- Coptic calendar: −19 – −18
- Discordian calendar: 1431
- Ethiopian calendar: 257–258
- Hebrew calendar: 4025–4026
- Hindu calendars
- Vikram Samvat: 321–322
- Shaka Samvat: 186–187
- Kali Yuga: 3365–3366
- Holocene calendar: 10265
- Iranian calendar: 357 BP – 356 BP
- Islamic calendar: 368 BH – 367 BH
- Javanese calendar: 144–145
- Julian calendar: 265; CCLXV
- Korean calendar: 2598
- Minguo calendar: 1647 before ROC 民前1647年
- Nanakshahi calendar: −1203
- Seleucid era: 576/577 AG
- Thai solar calendar: 807–808
- Tibetan calendar: ཤིང་ཕོ་སྤྲེ་ལོ་ (male Wood-Monkey); 391 or 10 or −762 — to — ཤིང་མོ་བྱ་ལོ་ (female Wood-Bird); 392 or 11 or −761

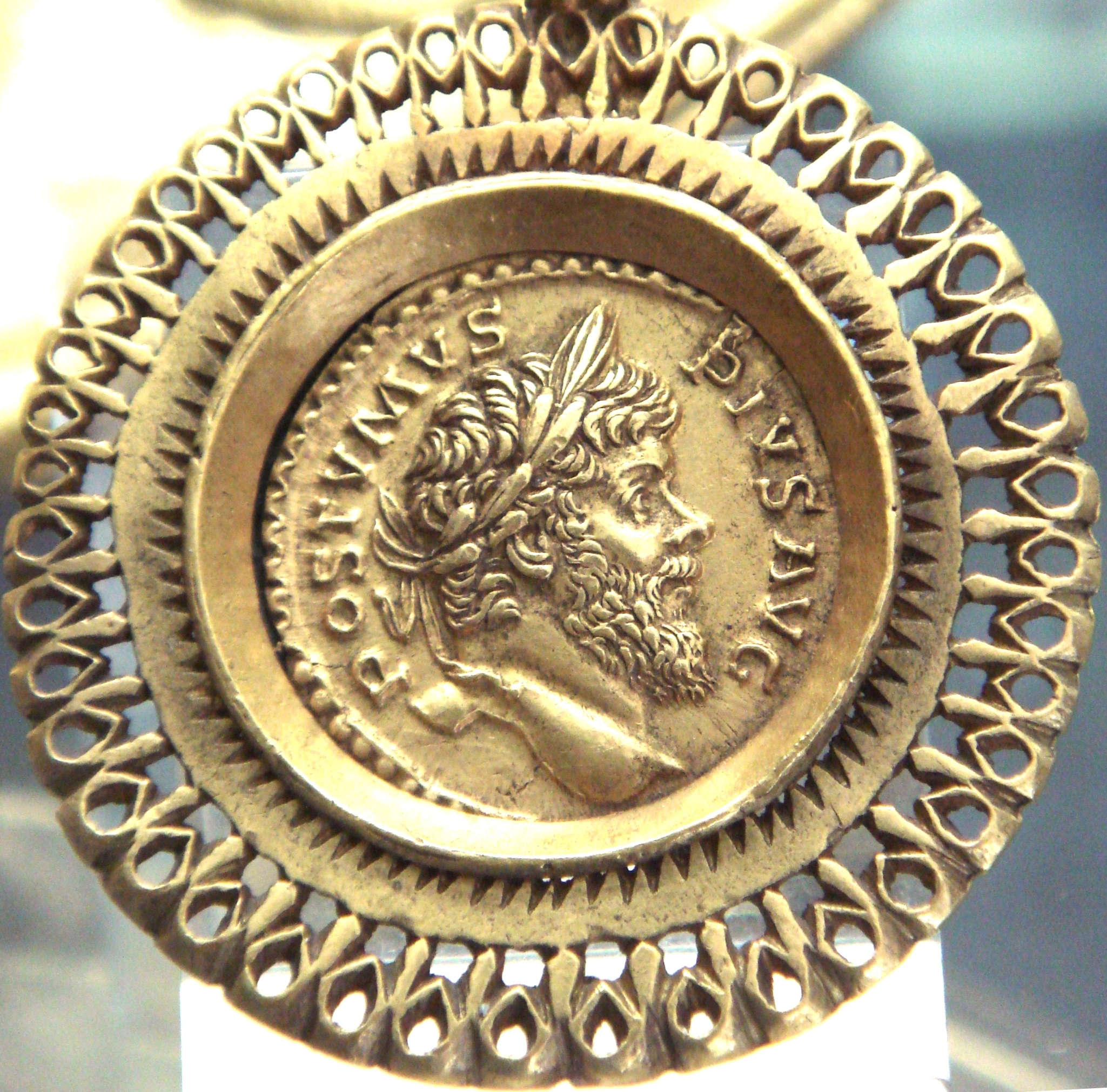
Aureus of Postumus, within a pendant

Year 265 (CCLXV) was a common year starting on Sunday of the Julian calendar. At the time, it was known as the Year of the Consulship of Valerianus and Lucillus (or, less frequently, year 1018 Ab urbe condita). The denomination 265 for this year has been used since the early medieval period, when the Anno Domini calendar era became the prevalent method in Europe for naming years.

== Events ==
=== By place ===
==== Roman Empire ====
- Emperor Gallienus tries twice to crush the usurper Postumus, but on the first occasion Aureolus, commander of the elite cavalry, carelessly lets him escape. The second time, Gallienus sustains an arrow wound and has to break off his siege of a Gallic town where Postumus has holed up. He makes no other serious attempt to overcome his rival, instead devoting his attention to the political and military problems in the Danube and eastern parts of the Roman Empire.
- Postumus makes no move to march on Rome and claim his territory south of Gaul.
- Gallienus gives the order to fortify Milan and Verona.
- Gallienus repels the invasion of the Goths in the Balkans.
- A general of Gallienus' army, Victorinus, defects to Postumus.

==== China ====
- Sima Zhao, who had been the regent and de facto primary authority of the state of Cao Wei for little over 10 years by this point, passes away, leaving his authority to his eldest son, Sima Yan, who will go on to disestablish the state of Cao Wei in February 266, founding the Jin dynasty.

== Births ==
- Eusebius of Caesarea, Greek historian (approximate date)

== Deaths ==
- Dionysius the Great, patriarch of Alexandria
- September 6 – Sima Zhao, Chinese general and politician (b. 211)
- Ma Jun, Chinese engineer and inventor of the south-pointing chariot
- Zhu (or Jing), Chinese empress of the Eastern Wu state
