= 238 =

238 in various calendars
- Gregorian calendar: 238; CCXXXVIII
- Ab urbe condita: 991
- Assyrian calendar: 4988
- Balinese saka calendar: 159–160
- Bengali calendar: −356 – −355
- Berber calendar: 1188
- Buddhist calendar: 782
- Burmese calendar: −400
- Byzantine calendar: 5746–5747
- Chinese calendar: 丁巳年 (Fire Snake); 2935 or 2728 — to — 戊午年 (Earth Horse); 2936 or 2729
- Coptic calendar: −46 – −45
- Discordian calendar: 1404
- Ethiopian calendar: 230–231
- Hebrew calendar: 3998–3999
- Hindu calendars
- Vikram Samvat: 294–295
- Shaka Samvat: 159–160
- Kali Yuga: 3338–3339
- Holocene calendar: 10238
- Iranian calendar: 384 BP – 383 BP
- Islamic calendar: 396 BH – 395 BH
- Javanese calendar: 116–117
- Julian calendar: 238; CCXXXVIII
- Korean calendar: 2571
- Minguo calendar: 1674 before ROC 民前1674年
- Nanakshahi calendar: −1230
- Seleucid era: 549/550 AG
- Thai solar calendar: 780–781
- Tibetan calendar: མེ་མོ་སྦྲུལ་ལོ་ (female Fire-Snake); 364 or −17 or −789 — to — ས་ཕོ་རྟ་ལོ་ (male Earth-Horse); 365 or −16 or −788

Year 238 (CCXXXVIII) was a common year starting on Monday of the Julian calendar. At the time, it was known as the Year of the Consulship of Pius and Pontianus (or, less frequently, year 991 Ab urbe condita). The denomination 238 for this year has been used since the early medieval period, when the Anno Domini calendar era became the prevalent method in Europe for naming years.

== Events ==
=== By place ===
==== Roman Empire ====
- Emperor Maximinus Thrax campaigns against the Carpians on the Danube in Moesia (Balkans). In spite of the payment of a tribute, the Romans fail to persuade the Goths and the Germanic tribes.
- c. March – Roman subjects in Africa revolt against Maximinus. The elderly Gordian yields to public demand that he succeed Maximinus and rules jointly with his 46-year-old son Gordian II.
- c. April – Battle of Carthage: Numidian forces loyal to Maximinus invade Africa with support of Legio III Augusta. Gordian II is killed and after a siege, Gordian I commits suicide by hanging himself with his belt.
- c. May – The Senate outlaws Maximinus for his bloodthirsty proscriptions in Ancient Rome and nominates two of its members, Pupienus and Balbinus, to the throne.
- Maximinus advances to the town Aquileia in northern Italy; his army suffers from famine and disease, while the city is besieged. Soldiers of Legio II Parthica kill him in his tent, along with his son Maximus (who is appointed co-emperor). Their corpses are decapitated and their heads carried to Rome.
- c. August – The Praetorian Guard storms the palace and captures Pupienus and Balbinus. They are dragged naked through the streets of Rome and executed. On the same day Gordian III, age 13, is proclaimed the new emperor. Timesitheus becomes his tutor and advisor.
- Future Emperor Valerian becomes princeps senatus.
- The Colosseum is restored after being damaged.
- The Goths, coming from Ukraine, cross the Danube and devastate the Roman Empire up to the border with Anatolia.
- In North Africa, Legio III Augusta is dissolved. Until its reconstitution in 253, Africa is defended by auxiliary forces only.

==== China ====
- Sima Yi, a Chinese general of the Cao Wei state, destroys the outlying northeastern warlord Gongsun Yuan in the Liaodong campaign.

=== By topic ===
==== Commerce ====
- The silver content of the Roman denarius falls to 28 percent under Emperor Gordian III, down from 35 percent under Alexander Severus.

== Births ==
- Wen Yang (or Ciqian), Chinese general (d. 291)
- Yang Yan (or Wuyuan), Chinese empress (d. 274)

== Deaths ==
- April 10 – Han Ji (or Gongzhi), Chinese politician
- April 12
  - Gordian I, Roman emperor (b. 159)
  - Gordian II, Roman emperor (b. 192)
- July 29
  - Pupienus, Roman emperor (b. 165)
  - Balbinus, Roman emperor (b. 178)
- Bu Lianshi, Chinese noblewoman and concubine
- Gongsun Yuan (or Wenyi), Chinese warlord
- Maximinus Thrax, Roman emperor (b. 173)
- Maximinus the Younger, Roman emperor
- Zhu Huan (or Xiumu), Chinese general (b. 177)
