= AD 142 =

142 in various calendars
- Gregorian calendar: 142; CXLII
- Ab urbe condita: 895
- Assyrian calendar: 4892
- Balinese saka calendar: 63–64
- Bengali calendar: −452 – −451
- Berber calendar: 1092
- Buddhist calendar: 686
- Burmese calendar: −496
- Byzantine calendar: 5650–5651
- Chinese calendar: 辛巳年 (Metal Snake); 2839 or 2632 — to — 壬午年 (Water Horse); 2840 or 2633
- Coptic calendar: −142 – −141
- Discordian calendar: 1308
- Ethiopian calendar: 134–135
- Hebrew calendar: 3902–3903
- Hindu calendars
- Vikram Samvat: 198–199
- Shaka Samvat: 63–64
- Kali Yuga: 3242–3243
- Holocene calendar: 10142
- Iranian calendar: 480 BP – 479 BP
- Islamic calendar: 495 BH – 494 BH
- Javanese calendar: 17–18
- Julian calendar: 142; CXLII
- Korean calendar: 2475
- Minguo calendar: 1770 before ROC 民前1770年
- Nanakshahi calendar: −1326
- Seleucid era: 453/454 AG
- Thai solar calendar: 684–685
- Tibetan calendar: ལྕགས་མོ་སྦྲུལ་ལོ་ (female Iron-Snake); 268 or −113 or −885 — to — ཆུ་ཕོ་རྟ་ལོ་ (male Water-Horse); 269 or −112 or −884

Year 142 (CXLII) was a common year starting on Sunday of the Julian calendar. At the time, it was known in the Roman Empire as the Year of the Consulship of Pactumeius and Quadratus (or, less frequently, year 895 Ab urbe condita). The denomination 142 for this year has been used since the early medieval period, when the Anno Domini calendar era became the prevalent method in Europe for naming years.

== Events ==
=== By place ===
==== Roman Empire ====
- Emperor Antoninus Pius orders the construction of the Antonine Wall. The wall stretches 39 miles (63 km), from Old Kilpatrick in West Dunbartonshire on the Firth of Clyde, to Carriden near Bo'ness on the Firth of Forth (Scotland). The Romans build 19 forts and smaller fortlets (milecastles), to protect the border against the Caledonians.
- Municipal doctors are named throughout the Roman Empire.

==== Asia ====
- First year of the Hanan era of the Chinese Han dynasty.
- The Chinese Taoist alchemist Wei Boyang, author of the Kinship of the Three, is the first to describe an early form of gunpowder solution.

=== By topic ===
==== Religion ====
- Marcion proclaims that the Old Testament is incompatible with Christianity.

== Births ==
- Papinian, Roman jurist and praetorian prefect (d. 212)
- Elpinice, Roman noblewoman (d. 165)
- Liu Biao, Chinese governor (d. 208)

== Deaths ==
- Hyginus, bishop of Rome (approximate date)
