= 161 =

161 may refer to:

- 161 (number), the natural number following 160 and preceding 162
- AD 161
- 161 BC
- 161 (New Jersey bus)
- UFC 161
- 161 Athor
- Radical 161
- 161, code for AFA, referring to Antifa or "anti-fascist action"
