= Castinus of Byzantium =

Bishop of Byzantium from 230 to 237

Saint Castinus of Byzantium
- Bishop of Byzantium
- Installed: 230
- Term ended: 237
- Predecessor: Cyriacus I of Byzantium
- Successor: Eugenius I of Byzantium

Personal details
- Died: 237
- Denomination: Early Christianity

Castinus of Byzantium (Greek: Καστῖνος; died 237) was reputedly the bishop of Byzantium between 230 and 237; in some catalogues, he appears as Constantine or Kastinos.

He was a senator from Rome, who initially was not a Christian. He converted to Early Christianity, being baptised by the bishop of Argyropolis, Cyrillianus. From then on, he gave his fortune to the poor and was devoted to the Church. He was bishop of Byzantium from 230 to 237. Until his tenure, the cathedral was near the sea in the area of present Galata. He built one of the oldest churches in Byzantium to honour Saint Euphemia.

Nicephorus Callistus refers to him in his works as Constantine.

His memory is revered on 25 January.

Church historian Frederick George Holweck says that there were no bishops at Byzantium in the third century.

== Bibliography ==
- The Ecumenical Patriarchate of Constantinople.

Titles of the Great Christian Church
Preceded by Cyriacus I	Bishop of Byzantium; 230 – 237	Succeeded by Eugenius I
