= AD 145 =

145 in various calendars
- Gregorian calendar: 145; CXLV
- Ab urbe condita: 898
- Assyrian calendar: 4895
- Balinese saka calendar: 66–67
- Bengali calendar: −449 – −448
- Berber calendar: 1095
- Buddhist calendar: 689
- Burmese calendar: −493
- Byzantine calendar: 5653–5654
- Chinese calendar: 甲申年 (Wood Monkey); 2842 or 2635 — to — 乙酉年 (Wood Rooster); 2843 or 2636
- Coptic calendar: −139 – −138
- Discordian calendar: 1311
- Ethiopian calendar: 137–138
- Hebrew calendar: 3905–3906
- Hindu calendars
- Vikram Samvat: 201–202
- Shaka Samvat: 66–67
- Kali Yuga: 3245–3246
- Holocene calendar: 10145
- Iranian calendar: 477 BP – 476 BP
- Islamic calendar: 492 BH – 491 BH
- Javanese calendar: 20–21
- Julian calendar: 145; CXLV
- Korean calendar: 2478
- Minguo calendar: 1767 before ROC 民前1767年
- Nanakshahi calendar: −1323
- Seleucid era: 456/457 AG
- Thai solar calendar: 687–688
- Tibetan calendar: ཤིང་ཕོ་སྤྲེ་ལོ་ (male Wood-Monkey); 271 or −110 or −882 — to — ཤིང་མོ་བྱ་ལོ་ (female Wood-Bird); 272 or −109 or −881

Year 145 (CXLV) was a common year starting on Thursday of the Julian calendar. At the time, it was known as the Year of the Consulship of Hadrianus and Caesar (or, less frequently, year 898 Ab urbe condita). The denomination 145 for this year has been used since the early medieval period, when the Anno Domini calendar era became the prevalent method in Europe for naming years.

== Events ==
=== By place ===
==== Roman Empire ====
- Antoninus Augustus Pius and Marcus Aurelius Caesar become Roman Consuls.
- Marcus Aurelius marries Faustina the Younger, the daughter of Antoninus Pius.
- Arrian becomes archon in Athens.

==== Asia ====
- Change of emperor from Han Chongdi to Han Zhidi of the Chinese Han dynasty.

== Births ==
- April 11 – Septimius Severus, Roman emperor (d. 211)

== Deaths ==
- Han Chongdi, Chinese emperor of the Han dynasty (b. 143)
