= 235 =

235 in various calendars
- Gregorian calendar: 235; CCXXXV
- Ab urbe condita: 988
- Assyrian calendar: 4985
- Balinese saka calendar: 156–157
- Bengali calendar: −359 – −358
- Berber calendar: 1185
- Buddhist calendar: 779
- Burmese calendar: −403
- Byzantine calendar: 5743–5744
- Chinese calendar: 甲寅年 (Wood Tiger); 2932 or 2725 — to — 乙卯年 (Wood Rabbit); 2933 or 2726
- Coptic calendar: −49 – −48
- Discordian calendar: 1401
- Ethiopian calendar: 227–228
- Hebrew calendar: 3995–3996
- Hindu calendars
- Vikram Samvat: 291–292
- Shaka Samvat: 156–157
- Kali Yuga: 3335–3336
- Holocene calendar: 10235
- Iranian calendar: 387 BP – 386 BP
- Islamic calendar: 399 BH – 398 BH
- Javanese calendar: 113–114
- Julian calendar: 235; CCXXXV
- Korean calendar: 2568
- Minguo calendar: 1677 before ROC 民前1677年
- Nanakshahi calendar: −1233
- Seleucid era: 546/547 AG
- Thai solar calendar: 777–778
- Tibetan calendar: ཤིང་ཕོ་སྟག་ལོ་ (male Wood-Tiger); 361 or −20 or −792 — to — ཤིང་མོ་ཡོས་ལོ་ (female Wood-Hare); 362 or −19 or −791

Year 235 (CCXXXV) was a common year starting on Thursday of the Julian calendar. At the time, it was known as the Year of the Consulship of Severus and Quintianus (or, less frequently, year 988 Ab urbe condita). The denomination 235 for this year has been used since the early medieval period, when the Anno Domini calendar era became the prevalent method in Europe for naming years.

== Events ==
=== By place ===
==== Roman Empire ====
- March 22 – Emperor Severus Alexander and his mother Iulia Mamaea are murdered by their own soldiers. The soldiers proclaim Maximinus Thrax as emperor. The Severan dynasty ends, marking the beginning of the Crisis of the Third Century.

=== By topic ===
==== Religion ====
- September 28 – Pope Pontian resigns, the first to abdicate, because he and Hippolytus, church leader of Rome, are exiled to the mines of Sardinia. Emperor Maximinus persecutes the Christians.
- November 21 – Anterus succeeds Pontian as the nineteenth pope of Rome.

== Births ==
- Sun Xiu, Chinese emperor of the Eastern Wu state (d. 264)

== Deaths ==
- March 22 – Severus Alexander, Roman emperor (b. 208)
- Cao Gun, Chinese imperial prince
- Cassius Dio, Roman historian
- Chen Zhen (or Xiaoqi), Chinese official and politician
- Gaius Petronius Magnus, Roman consul and usurper
- Guo Nüwang, Chinese empress
- Hippolytus, Christian theologian and writer (b. 170)
- Julia Avita Mamaea, mother of Severus Alexander (b. 180)
- Tiberius Julius Cotys III (or Kotys), Roman client king
- Tiberius Julius Rhescuporis IV, Roman client king
- Titius Quartinus, Roman governor and usurper
- Xin Pi (or Zuozhi), Chinese official and politician
- Yang Yi (or Weigong), Chinese official and adviser
