= Philadelphus of Byzantium =

Bishop of Byzantium from 211 to 217

- Bishop of Byzantium
- Installed: 211
- Term ended: 217
- Predecessor: Marcus I of Byzantium
- Successor: Cyriacus I of Byzantium

Personal details
- Died: 217
- Denomination: Early Christianity

Philadelphus of Byzantium (Greek: Φιλάδελφος; died 217) is referred to as the first bishop of Byzantium after the eight-year administration of the Church of Byzantium by a priest whose name has not been recorded. Philadelphus was bishop for six years (211 – 217).

== Bibliography ==
- Οικουμενικό Πατριαρχείο.

Titles of the Great Christian Church
Preceded by Marcus I	Bishop of Byzantium; 211 – 217	Succeeded by Cyriacus I
