= 212 =

212 in various calendars
- Gregorian calendar: 212; CCXII
- Ab urbe condita: 965
- Assyrian calendar: 4962
- Balinese saka calendar: 133–134
- Bengali calendar: −382 – −381
- Berber calendar: 1162
- Buddhist calendar: 756
- Burmese calendar: −426
- Byzantine calendar: 5720–5721
- Chinese calendar: 辛卯年 (Metal Rabbit); 2909 or 2702 — to — 壬辰年 (Water Dragon); 2910 or 2703
- Coptic calendar: −72 – −71
- Discordian calendar: 1378
- Ethiopian calendar: 204–205
- Hebrew calendar: 3972–3973
- Hindu calendars
- Vikram Samvat: 268–269
- Shaka Samvat: 133–134
- Kali Yuga: 3312–3313
- Holocene calendar: 10212
- Iranian calendar: 410 BP – 409 BP
- Islamic calendar: 423 BH – 422 BH
- Javanese calendar: 89–90
- Julian calendar: 212; CCXII
- Korean calendar: 2545
- Minguo calendar: 1700 before ROC 民前1700年
- Nanakshahi calendar: −1256
- Seleucid era: 523/524 AG
- Thai solar calendar: 754–755
- Tibetan calendar: ལྕགས་མོ་ཡོས་ལོ་ (female Iron-Hare); 338 or −43 or −815 — to — ཆུ་ཕོ་འབྲུག་ལོ་ (male Water-Dragon); 339 or −42 or −814

Year 212 (CCXII) was a leap year starting on Wednesday of the Julian calendar. At the time, it was known as the Year of the Consulship of Asper and Camilius (or, less frequently, year 965 Ab urbe condita). The denomination 212 for this year has been used since the early medieval period, when the Anno Domini calendar era became the prevalent method in Europe for naming years.

== Events ==
=== By place ===
==== Roman Empire ====
- The edict of Emperor Caracalla (Constitutio Antoniniana) extends Roman citizenship to all free inhabitants of the Roman Empire, with the exception of a limited group that may include Egyptians. The Jewish people are among those who receive citizenship. All free women in the Empire are given the same rights as Roman women.
- Roman jurist Papinian, one of the famous jurists who flourished during the reign of the late emperor Septimius Severus, refuses to write a legal defence for the murder of Caracalla's brother, Emperor Geta. He is beheaded in Rome, in Caracalla's presence.
- Caracalla quiets the objections of the Roman army to Geta's murder, by huge donations.
- Construction begins on the Baths of Caracalla in Rome.
- Edessa in Mesopotamia becomes a Roman province.

== Deaths ==
- Annia Cornificia Faustina Minor, daughter of Marcus Aurelius (b. 160)
- Gao You, Chinese scholar, historian, politician and writer (b 168).
- Ma Teng (or Shoucheng), Chinese general and warlord
- Papinian, Roman jurist and praetorian prefect (b. 142)
- Serenus Sammonicus, Roman poet and physician
- Xun Yu, Chinese politician and adviser (b. 163)
- Zhang Hong, Chinese official and politician (b. 153)
