= 211 =

211 in various calendars
- Gregorian calendar: 211; CCXI
- Ab urbe condita: 964
- Assyrian calendar: 4961
- Balinese saka calendar: 132–133
- Bengali calendar: −383 – −382
- Berber calendar: 1161
- Buddhist calendar: 755
- Burmese calendar: −427
- Byzantine calendar: 5719–5720
- Chinese calendar: 庚寅年 (Metal Tiger); 2908 or 2701 — to — 辛卯年 (Metal Rabbit); 2909 or 2702
- Coptic calendar: −73 – −72
- Discordian calendar: 1377
- Ethiopian calendar: 203–204
- Hebrew calendar: 3971–3972
- Hindu calendars
- Vikram Samvat: 267–268
- Shaka Samvat: 132–133
- Kali Yuga: 3311–3312
- Holocene calendar: 10211
- Iranian calendar: 411 BP – 410 BP
- Islamic calendar: 424 BH – 423 BH
- Javanese calendar: 88–89
- Julian calendar: 211; CCXI
- Korean calendar: 2544
- Minguo calendar: 1701 before ROC 民前1701年
- Nanakshahi calendar: −1257
- Seleucid era: 522/523 AG
- Thai solar calendar: 753–754
- Tibetan calendar: ལྕགས་ཕོ་སྟག་ལོ་ (male Iron-Tiger); 337 or −44 or −816 — to — ལྕགས་མོ་ཡོས་ལོ་ (female Iron-Hare); 338 or −43 or −815

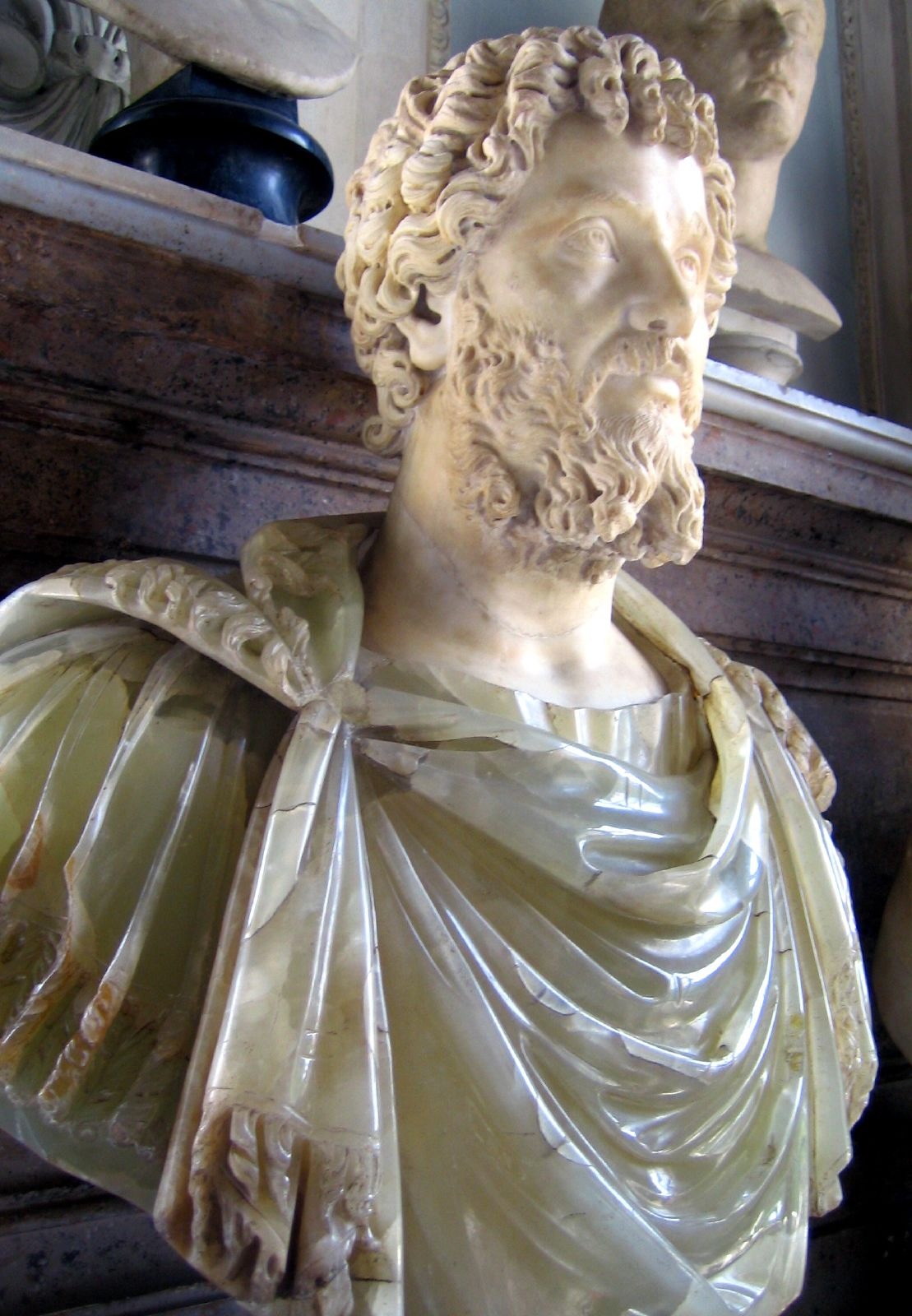
Emperor Septimius Severus (145–211)

Year 211 (CCXI) was a common year starting on Tuesday of the Julian calendar. At the time, in the Roman Empire it was known as the Year of the Consulship of Terentius and Bassus (or, less frequently, year 964 Ab urbe condita). The denomination 211 for this year has been used since the early medieval period, when the Anno Domini calendar era became the prevalent method in Europe for naming years. In 211, the Julian year stayed behind tropical year by accumulated two days.

== Events ==
=== By place ===
==== Roman Empire ====
- February 4 – Emperor Septimius Severus, having fallen ill, dies in Eboracum (modern-day York) while on campaign in Britain after an 18-year reign. He is later deified by the Senate. His sons Caracalla and Geta succeed him as joint Roman emperors.
- December 19 – Geta is lured to come without his bodyguards to meet Caracalla, to discuss a possible reconciliation. When he arrives the Praetorian Guard murders him, and he dies in the arms of his mother Julia Domna.
- Eboracum becomes the capital of Britannia Inferior, a northern province of the Roman Empire.

==== China ====
- January – Warlord Cao Cao writes Ràng Xiàn Zì Míng Běn Zhì Lìng (讓縣自明本志令)
- March – September: Battle of Tong Pass: Cao Cao defeats Ma Chao.

==== Parthia ====
- Ardashir I becomes king of part of Persia.

=== By topic ===
==== Art ====
- Baths of Caracalla construction begins (approximate date).

==== Religion ====
- Marcus I is succeeded by Philadelphus, as Patriarch of Constantinople.

== Births ==
- Sima Zhao, Chinese general and politician (d. 265)
- Xiahou Hui (or Yuanrong), Chinese noblewoman (d. 234)

== Deaths ==
- February 4 – Septimius Severus, Roman emperor (b. 145)
- December 26 – Publius Septimius Geta, Roman emperor (b. 189)
- Fulvia Plautilla, Roman empress and wife of Caracalla
- Serapion of Antioch, patriarch of Antioch
