= Olympianus of Byzantium =

Bishop of Byzantium from 187 to 198

- Bishop of Byzantium
- Installed: 187
- Term ended: 198
- Predecessor: Pertinax of Byzantium
- Successor: Marcus I of Byzantium

Personal details
- Died: 198
- Denomination: Early Christianity

Olympianus of Byzantium (Greek: Ὀλυμπιανός; died 198) was the bishop of Byzantium for eleven years (187 – 198). He succeeded bishop Pertinax of Byzantium. In 196, Byzantium was conquered by Roman emperor Septimius Severus during his rivalry with Pescennius Niger. Septimius Severus took the right of metropolis from the city and made it part of the Heracleia. Byzantium remained a bishopric under Heracleia for more than a century.

Olympianus' successor was Marcus I of Byzantium.

== Bibliography ==
- www.ec-patr.org.

Titles of the Great Christian Church
Preceded by Pertinax	Bishop of Byzantium; 187 – 198	Succeeded by Marcus I
