= 291 =

291 in various calendars
Gregorian calendar	291; CCXCI
Ab urbe condita	1044
Assyrian calendar	5041
Balinese saka calendar	212–213
Bengali calendar	−303 – −302
Berber calendar	1241
Buddhist calendar	835
Burmese calendar	−347
Byzantine calendar	5799–5800
Chinese calendar	庚戌年 (Metal Dog); 2988 or 2781 — to — 辛亥年 (Metal Pig); 2989 or 2782
Coptic calendar	7–8
Discordian calendar	1457
Ethiopian calendar	283–284
Hebrew calendar	4051–4052
- Hindu calendars
Vikram Samvat	347–348
Shaka Samvat	212–213
Kali Yuga	3391–3392
Holocene calendar	10291
Iranian calendar	331 BP – 330 BP
Islamic calendar	341 BH – 340 BH
Javanese calendar	171–172
Julian calendar	291; CCXCI
Korean calendar	2624
Minguo calendar	1621 before ROC 民前1621年
Nanakshahi calendar	−1177
Seleucid era	602/603 AG
Thai solar calendar	833–834
Tibetan calendar	阳金狗年 (male Iron-Dog); 417 or 36 or −736 — to — 阴金猪年 (female Iron-Pig); 418 or 37 or −735

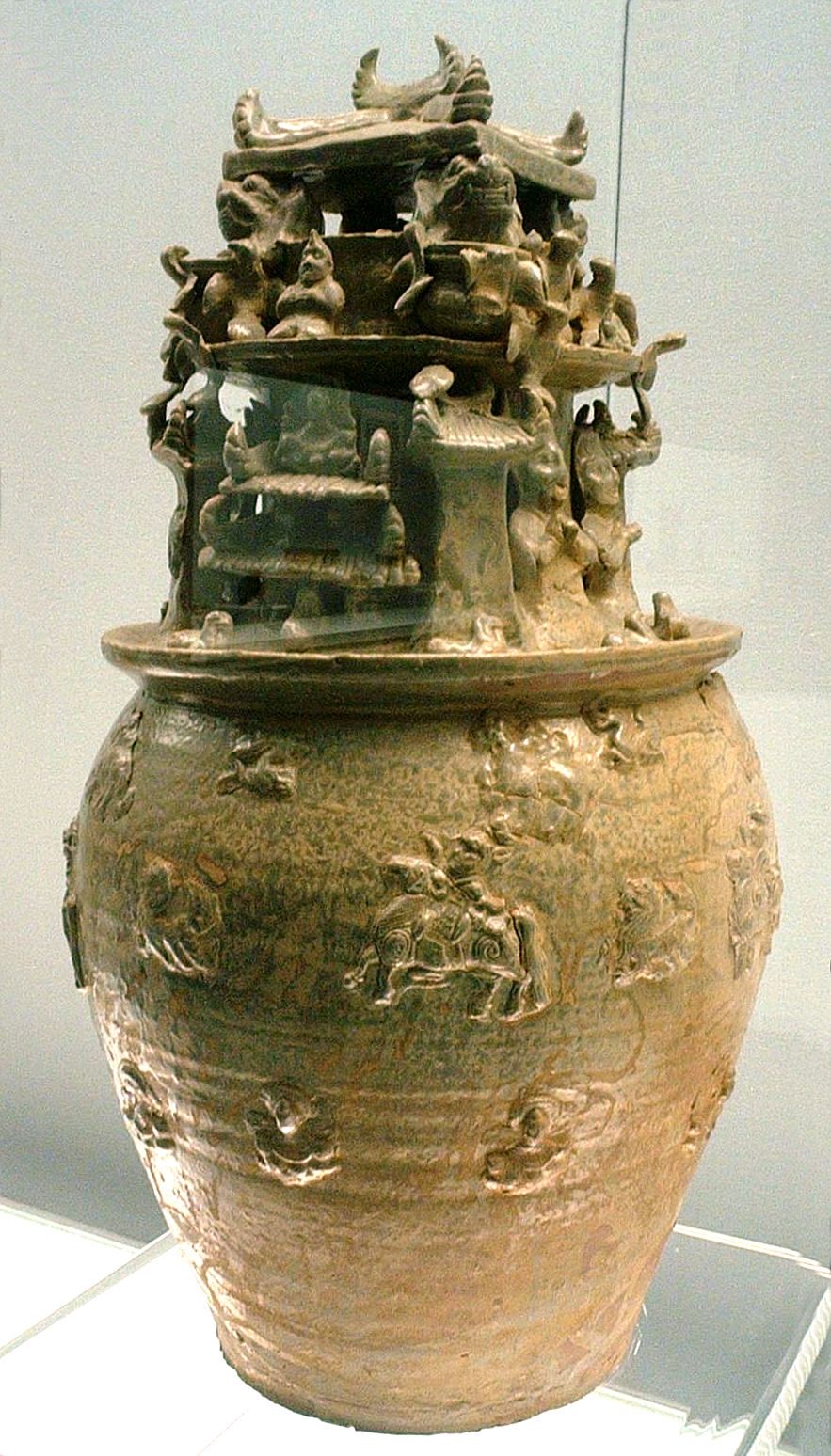
Hunping jar of the Jin Dynasty

Year 291 (CCXCI) was a common year starting on Thursday of the Julian calendar. At the time, it was known in Rome as the Year of the Consulship of Tiberianus and Dio (or, less frequently, year 1044 Ab urbe condita). The denomination 291 for this year has been used since the early medieval period, when the Anno Domini calendar era became the prevalent method in Europe for naming years.

== Events ==
=== By place ===
==== Roman Empire ====
- Winter: The emperors Diocletian and Maximian convene in Milan.
- An uneasy peace is established between the emperors Diocletian and Maximian on the one hand, and the rival emperor Carausius on the other.
- Perhaps in cooperation with the forces of Maximian, Carausius campaigns successfully against Germanic raids in Gaul and Britain. Also during his reign, Carausius begins building the forts of the Saxon Shore.

==== Northern Europe ====
- The Alemanni, having been expelled from part of their territory by the Burgundians, seek to regain their lost lands. These peoples had unsuccessfully invaded Gaul in tandem in 285/6, and the Alemanni had likely been weakened by the Roman counter-invasions of 287 and 288.
- A force of Goths defeat the Burgundians.
- The Tervingian Goths and Taifali fight the Vandals and Gepids.

==== Africa ====
- The Blemmyes invade the Kingdom of Kush.

==== Persian Empire ====
- King Bahram II fights against a coalition consisting of his brother Hormizd of Sakastan, the Kushano-Sasanians, and the Gilans.

==== China ====
- War of the Eight Princes: After the death of Emperor Sima Yan (Jin Wudi), a civil war breaks out among the princes and dukes of the Jin Dynasty. The struggle devastates and depopulates the provinces of northern China.

== Births ==
- Saint Agnes, Christian martyress (d. c. 304)
- Saint Hilarion, anchorite and saint (d. 371)
- Li Xiu, female general during the Jin Dynasty
- Saint Philomena, Christian martyress (d. c. 304)

== Deaths ==
- Sima Liang, regent during the reign of Sima Yan
- Sima Wei, prince during the Jin Dynasty (b. 271)
- Wei Guan, general of the Kingdom of Wei (b. 220)
- Wen Yang, general of the Kingdom of Wei (b. 238)
- Yang Jun, official during the reign of Sima Yan
