= Zhang Hong (Han dynasty) =

Politician serving warlords Sun Ce and Sun Quan (153-212)

- 張紘

Chief Clerk (長史) (under Sun Quan)
- In office 208 – 212

Commandant of the East District of Kuaiji (會稽東部都尉)
- In office c. 200s – 208

Attendant Imperial Secretary (侍御史)
- In office 199 – c. 200s
- Monarch: Emperor Xian of Han

Personal details
- Born: 153 Yangzhou, Jiangsu
- Died: 212 (aged 59) or 229?
- Children: Zhang Xuan
- Occupation: Politician, scholar
- Courtesy name: Zigang (子綱)

Zhang Hong (153–212), courtesy name Zigang, was a Chinese politician serving under the warlords Sun Ce and Sun Quan during the late Eastern Han dynasty of China.

Originally from Guangling Commandery (廣陵郡; around present-day Yangzhou, Jiangsu), Zhang Hong and Zhang Zhao were known as the "Two Zhangs" and they were recruited by Sun Jian to be his advisers. He was a close friend of the Sun family, and when Sun Jian was involved in his campaigns, Zhang Hong served him as a privy adviser. In the days of Sun Ce, Zhang Hong was often responsible for writing official memorials and essays to Emperor Xian and Cao Cao. After Sun Ce's death, he was sent to serve Cao Cao, and then was later sent by Cao Cao to monitor Sun Quan's activities. Zhang Hong, however, remained loyal to Sun Quan, and on his deathbed, petitioned Sun Quan to develop the city of Moling (present-day Nanjing, Jiangsu), which ultimately became the imperial capital of the state of Eastern Wu in the Three Kingdoms period.

== See also ==
- Lists of people of the Three Kingdoms
