= AD 161 =

161 in various calendars
- Gregorian calendar: 161; CLXI
- Ab urbe condita: 914
- Assyrian calendar: 4911
- Balinese saka calendar: 82–83
- Bengali calendar: −433 – −432
- Berber calendar: 1111
- Buddhist calendar: 705
- Burmese calendar: −477
- Byzantine calendar: 5669–5670
- Chinese calendar: 庚子年 (Metal Rat); 2858 or 2651 — to — 辛丑年 (Metal Ox); 2859 or 2652
- Coptic calendar: −123 – −122
- Discordian calendar: 1327
- Ethiopian calendar: 153–154
- Hebrew calendar: 3921–3922
- Hindu calendars
- Vikram Samvat: 217–218
- Shaka Samvat: 82–83
- Kali Yuga: 3261–3262
- Holocene calendar: 10161
- Iranian calendar: 461 BP – 460 BP
- Islamic calendar: 475 BH – 474 BH
- Javanese calendar: 37–38
- Julian calendar: 161; CLXI
- Korean calendar: 2494
- Minguo calendar: 1751 before ROC 民前1751年
- Nanakshahi calendar: −1307
- Seleucid era: 472/473 AG
- Thai solar calendar: 703–704
- Tibetan calendar: ལྕགས་ཕོ་བྱི་བ་ལོ་ (male Iron-Rat); 287 or −94 or −866 — to — ལྕགས་མོ་གླང་ལོ་ (female Iron-Ox); 288 or −93 or −865

Year 161 (CLXI) was a common year starting on Wednesday of the Julian calendar. At the time, it was known as the Year of the Consulship of Caesar and Aurelius (or, less frequently, year 914 Ab urbe condita). The denomination 161 for this year has been used since the early medieval period, when the Anno Domini calendar era became the prevalent method in Europe for naming years.

== Events ==
=== By place ===
==== Roman Empire ====
- March 7 – Emperor Antoninus Pius dies, and is succeeded by Marcus Aurelius, who shares imperial power with Lucius Verus, although Marcus retains the title Pontifex Maximus.
- Marcus Aurelius, a Spaniard like Trajan and Hadrian, is a stoical disciple of Epictetus, and an energetic man of action. He pursues the policy of his predecessor and maintains good relations with the Senate. As a legislator, he endeavors to create new principles of morality and humanity, particularly favoring women and slaves.
- Aurelius reduces the weight of a goldpiece, the aureus, from 7.81 grams to 7.12 grams.

==== Parthian Empire ====
- Autumn – The Parthians invade Armenia, and install their own candidate on the throne. A legion (perhaps Legio IX Hispana) is destroyed at Elegeia.

=== By topic ===
==== Art and Science ====
- Gaius' Institutiones are published.

==== Commerce ====
- The silver content of the Roman denarius falls to 68 percent under Emperor Marcus Aurelius, down from 75 percent under Antoninus Pius.

== Births ==
- August 31 – Commodus, Roman emperor (d. 192)
- Liu Bei, founder of the Shu Han (Three Kingdoms) (d. 223)
- Lü Dai, general of the Eastern Wu state (Three Kingdoms) (d. 256)

== Deaths ==
- March 7 – Antoninus Pius, Roman emperor (b. AD 86)
- Athenais, Roman noblewoman (b. AD 143)
