= 208 =

208 in various calendars
- Gregorian calendar: 208; CCVIII
- Ab urbe condita: 961
- Assyrian calendar: 4958
- Balinese saka calendar: 129–130
- Bengali calendar: −386 – −385
- Berber calendar: 1158
- Buddhist calendar: 752
- Burmese calendar: −430
- Byzantine calendar: 5716–5717
- Chinese calendar: 丁亥年 (Fire Pig); 2905 or 2698 — to — 戊子年 (Earth Rat); 2906 or 2699
- Coptic calendar: −76 – −75
- Discordian calendar: 1374
- Ethiopian calendar: 200–201
- Hebrew calendar: 3968–3969
- Hindu calendars
- Vikram Samvat: 264–265
- Shaka Samvat: 129–130
- Kali Yuga: 3308–3309
- Holocene calendar: 10208
- Iranian calendar: 414 BP – 413 BP
- Islamic calendar: 427 BH – 426 BH
- Javanese calendar: 85–86
- Julian calendar: 208; CCVIII
- Korean calendar: 2541
- Minguo calendar: 1704 before ROC 民前1704年
- Nanakshahi calendar: −1260
- Seleucid era: 519/520 AG
- Thai solar calendar: 750–751
- Tibetan calendar: མེ་མོ་ཕག་ལོ་ (female Fire-Boar); 334 or −47 or −819 — to — ས་ཕོ་བྱི་བ་ལོ་ (male Earth-Rat); 335 or −46 or −818

Battle of Red Cliffs (Chi Bi)

Year 208 (CCVIII) was a leap year starting on Friday of the Julian calendar. At the time, it was known as the Year of the Consulship of Aurelius and Geta (or, less frequently, year 961 Ab urbe condita). The denomination 208 for this year has been used since the early medieval period, when the Anno Domini calendar era became the prevalent method in Europe for naming years.

== Events ==
=== By place ===
==== China ====
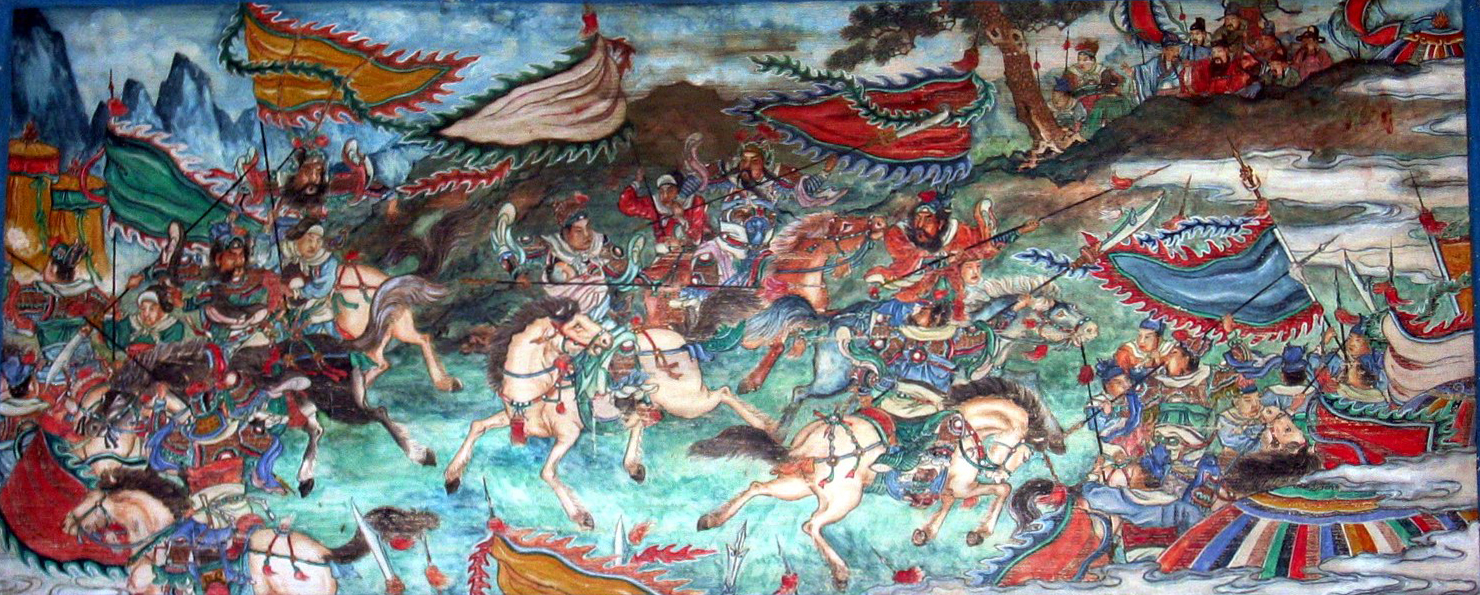
Zhao Yun fights at Changban (or Jing Province)

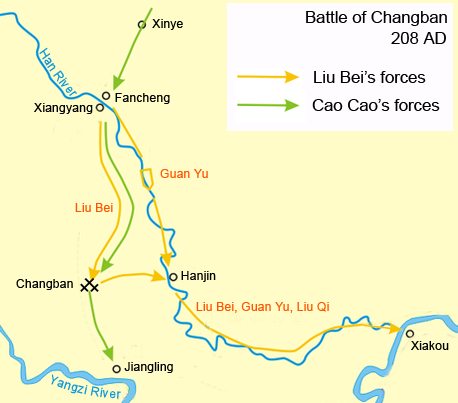
Map of the Battle of Changban

- Spring – Battle of Jiangxia: Sun Quan defeats Huang Zu.
- October
  - Warlord Cao Cao marches south with his army, and captures the enemy fleet at Jiangling.
  - Battle of Changban: Warlord Liu Bei escapes from Cao Cao.
- December 10 – Cao Cao writes Duǎn Ge Xíng.
- Winter – Zhou Yu and Liu Bei defeat Cao Cao at the Battle of Red Cliffs; along with the Battle of Yamen and Battle of Lake Poyang. This is one of the largest naval battles in China's history.

==== Parthia ====
- King Vologases VI succeeds his father Vologases V to the throne. His brother Artabanus V begins a rebellion against him in the Parthian Empire.
- Ardashir I, ruler of Istakhr (Persia), revolts against his brother and founds the Sassanid Dynasty.

==== Roman Empire ====
- Marcus Aurelius Antoninus Augustus and his brother Publius Septimius Geta Caesar become Roman consuls.
- Emperor Septimius Severus leads an expedition (20,000 men) into Britannia, crosses Hadrian's Wall and moves through eastern Scotland. The Roman army pushes the Caledonians back to the River Tay and Severus signs a peace treaty. He repairs the Antonine Wall (his repairs are sometimes called the Severan Wall).
- Britain is divided: in the north, Lower Britain (Britannia Inferior) is administered from the fortress at Eburacum (modern York), and in the south, Upper Britain (Britannia Superior) is controlled by the legions at Deva Victrix (Chester) and Isca Augusta (Caerleon) with its capital at Londinium (London).

== Births ==
- Cao Li, Chinese imperial prince (d. 229)
- Diadumenian, Roman emperor (d. 218)
- Sima Shi, Chinese general and regent (d. 255)
- Severus Alexander, Roman emperor (d. 235)

== Deaths ==
- Cao Chong (or Cangshu), Chinese warlord (b. 196)
- Huang Zu, Chinese general and administrator
- Hua Tuo, Chinese physician and surgeon (b. 140)
- Kong Rong, Chinese warlord and politician (b. 153)
- Liu Biao, Chinese governor and warlord (b. 142)
- Liu Fu, Chinese governor and politician
- Vologases V, king of the Parthian Empire
