= Antyllus =

Ancient Greek doctor

Antyllus (Ancient Greek: Ἄντυλλος) was a Greek surgeon, who lived in the 2nd century AD in Rome. He is most notable for his method of treatment of aneurysms. He described the types of aneurysms, and created a taxonomy related to the lesions' potential for rupture. He lived in the same era as Galen, and as Galen was dominant figure in the field of medicine, Antyllus excelled in surgery. His works have been lost, though some are reflected in the writings of Oribasius and Paul of Aegina. He developed specific instructions for a number of operations. He also listed the indications and contraindications and described the complications that could arise from the operations. His operation for aneurysm remained the standard procedure until the 19th century. Antyllus is also said to have developed a procedure to extract cataracts from the eye via suction, later improved by Muhammad ibn Zakariya al-Razi in the 10th century. Additionally, Antyllus has also been referenced by Paul of Aegina regarding the surgical procedure known today as a tracheotomy.
