= Marcus I of Byzantium =

Bishop of Byzantium from 198 to 211

- Bishop of Byzantium
- Installed: 198
- Term ended: 211
- Predecessor: Olympianus of Byzantium
- Successor: Philadelphus of Byzantium

Personal details
- Died: 211
- Denomination: Early Christianity

Marcus I of Byzantium (Greek: Μᾶρκος; died 211) was the bishop of Byzantium for 13 years (198 – 211). He succeeded bishop Olympianus of Byzantium. His term of office took place during the persecution of Christians by Roman emperor Septimius Severus. His successor was Philadelphus of Byzantium.

== Bibliography ==
- Marcus I page on Ecumenical Patriarchate website.

Titles of the Great Christian Church
Preceded by Olympianus	Bishop of Byzantium; 198 – 211	Succeeded by Philadelphus
