= Arteriotomy =

Medical term for an opening or cut of an artery wall

- ICD-9-CM: 38.98

Arteriotomy (or arterotomy) is a medical term for an opening or cut of an artery wall. It is a common step in many vascular surgical procedures and operations. The corresponding term for an incision into a vein is a venotomy.

Either a transverse or a longitudinal incision can be made (with respect to the direction of the artery), depending on the situation. The incision is typically made with a scalpel and extended with surgical scissors.

== See also ==
- List of surgeries by type
