= 160s =

Decade

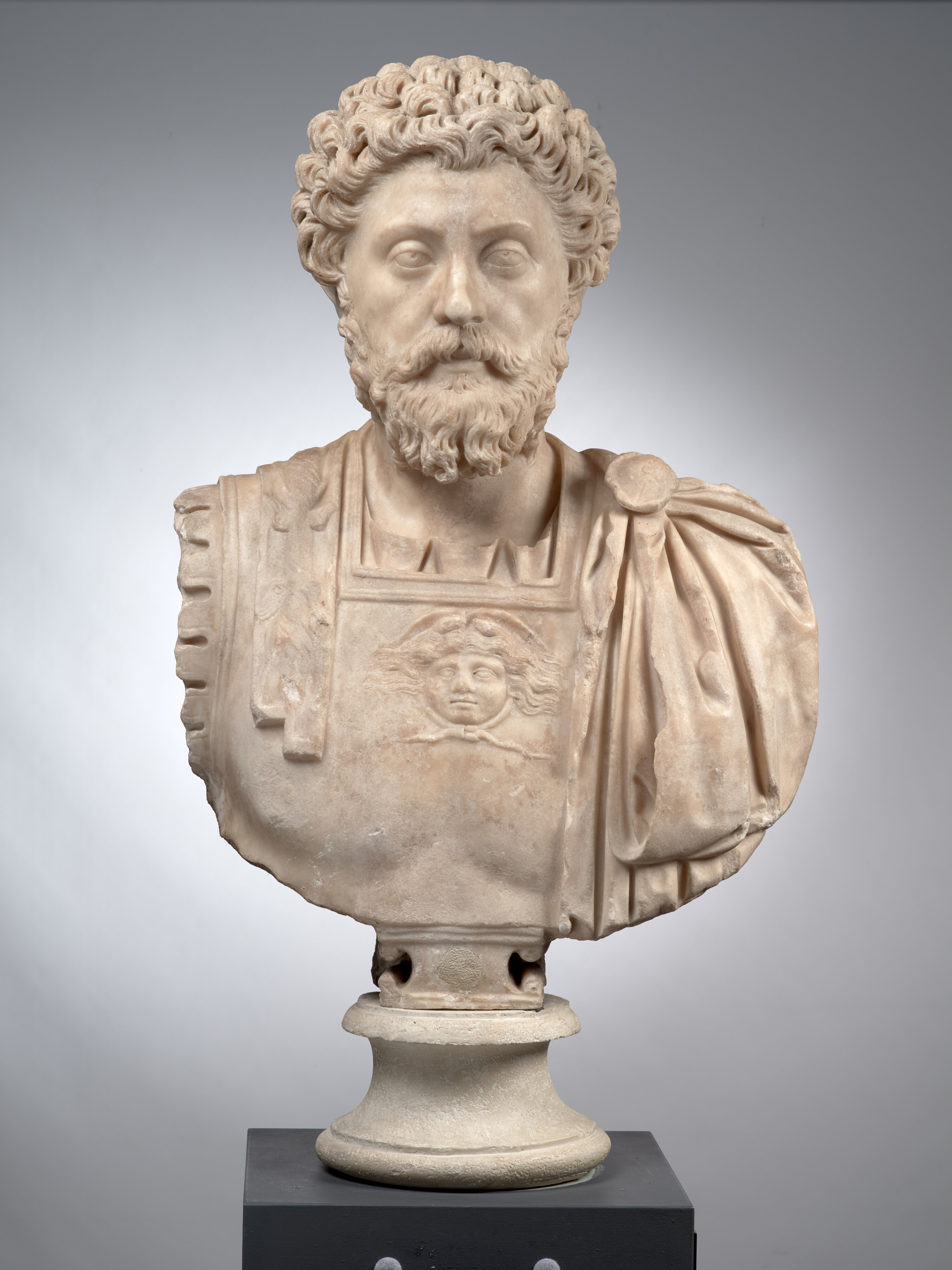
Marcus Aurelius became Roman emperor in 161, ruling till 180.

The 160s decade ran from January 1, 160, to December 31, 169.

== Events ==
=== By place ===
- In Roman Empire, the Antonine Wall in Britain is retaken by Roman legions.
- In Jiuzhen (modern day Northern Vietnam) during the second Era of Northern Domination, a rebellion broke out but was swiftly quelled when the rebels surrendered to the newly appointed governor of Jiaozhi, who had previously governed the commandery in the 140s.

=== By topic ===
==== Art and Science ====
- In Rome, the manufacturing of soap containing grease, lime and ashes begins.
- Appian writes Ρωμαικα, known in English as the Roman History, in which he includes the history of each nation conquered up until the moment of its conquest.

==== Religion ====
- The first Buddhist monks arrive in China.

=== By place ===
==== Roman Empire ====
- March 7 – Emperor Antoninus Pius dies, and is succeeded by Marcus Aurelius, who shares imperial power with Lucius Verus, although Marcus retains the title Pontifex Maximus.
- Marcus Aurelius, a Spaniard like Trajan and Hadrian, is a stoical disciple of Epictetus, and an energetic man of action. He pursues the policy of his predecessor and maintains good relations with the Senate. As a legislator, he endeavors to create new principles of morality and humanity, particularly favoring women and slaves.
- Aurelius reduces the weight of a goldpiece, the aureus, from 7.81 grams to 7.12 grams.

==== Parthian Empire ====
- Autumn – The Parthians invade Armenia, and install their own candidate on the throne. A legion (perhaps Legio IX Hispana) is destroyed at Elegeia.

=== By topic ===
==== Art and Science ====
- Gaius' Institutiones are published.

==== Commerce ====
- The silver content of the Roman denarius falls to 68 percent under Emperor Marcus Aurelius, down from 75 percent under Antoninus Pius.

=== By place ===
==== Roman Empire ====
- Lucius Verus begins a war with the Parthians, due to the invasion of Syria and Armenia by King Vologases IV of Parthia.

=== By topic ===
==== Art and Science ====
- Arrian, Greek historian and writer, publishes Indica, a work on India and its people.

=== By place ===
==== Roman Empire ====
- Marcus Statius Priscus re-conquers Armenia; the capital city of Artaxata is ruined.

=== By place ===
==== Roman Empire ====
- Emperor Marcus Aurelius gives his daughter Lucilla in marriage to his co-emperor Lucius Verus.
- Avidius Cassius, one of Lucius Verus' generals, crosses the Euphrates and invades Parthia.
- Ctesiphon is captured by the Romans, but returns to the Parthians after the end of the war.
- The Antonine Wall in Scotland is abandoned by the Romans.
- Seleucia on the Tigris is destroyed.

=== By place ===
==== Roman Empire ====
- A Roman military expedition under Avidius Cassius is successful against Parthia, capturing Artaxata, Seleucia on the Tigris, and Ctesiphon. The Parthians sue for peace.
- Antonine Plague: A pandemic breaks out in Rome, after the Roman army returns from Parthia. The plague significantly depopulates the Roman Empire and China.
- Legio II Italica is levied by Emperor Marcus Aurelius.
- Dura-Europos is taken by the Romans.
- The Romans establish a garrison at Doura Europos on the Euphrates, a control point for the commercial route to the Persian Gulf.
- Avidius Cassius takes Nisibis, and conquers the north of Mesopotamia.
- Marcus Aurelius creates 4 legal districts (iuridici) in Italy (5 if Rome is included).

==== Asia ====
- Sindae becomes ruler of the Korean kingdom of Goguryeo.

=== By topic ===
==== Religion ====
- The philosopher Justin of Nablus is executed in Rome as a Christian.
- Discourse to the Greek (Oratio ad Graecos), by the Syrian Tatian, is the first treatise on the evils of paganism in Christian literature.

=== By place ===
==== Roman Empire ====
- Dacia is invaded by barbarians.
- Conflict erupts on the Danube frontier between Rome and the Germanic tribe of the Marcomanni.
- Emperor Marcus Aurelius appoints his sons Commodus and Marcus Annius Verus as co-rulers (Caesar), while he and Lucius Verus travel to Germany.
- End of the war with Parthia: The Parthians leave Armenia and eastern Mesopotamia, which both become Roman protectorates.
- A plague (possibly small pox) comes from the East and spreads throughout the Roman Empire, lasting for roughly twenty years.
- The Lombards invade Pannonia (modern Hungary). They are quickly dispatched by the Roman Army.

==== Asia ====
- King Chogo of Baekje succeeds to the throne of Baekje, in the Korean peninsula.
- Scholars who have denounced eunuchs are arrested, killed or banished from the capital and official life in Han dynasty China. This is the first of the Disasters of the Partisan Prohibitions, which end in 184.
- A Roman envoy arrives by sea in Rinan commandery, in southern China (central Vietnam). He travels to the Chinese capital Luoyang, and is greeted by Emperor Huan of the Han dynasty.

=== By topic ===
==== Religion ====
- Pope Soter succeeds Pope Anicetus as the twelfth pope of Rome.
- Alypius succeeds Laurence as Patriarch of Constantinople.

=== By place ===
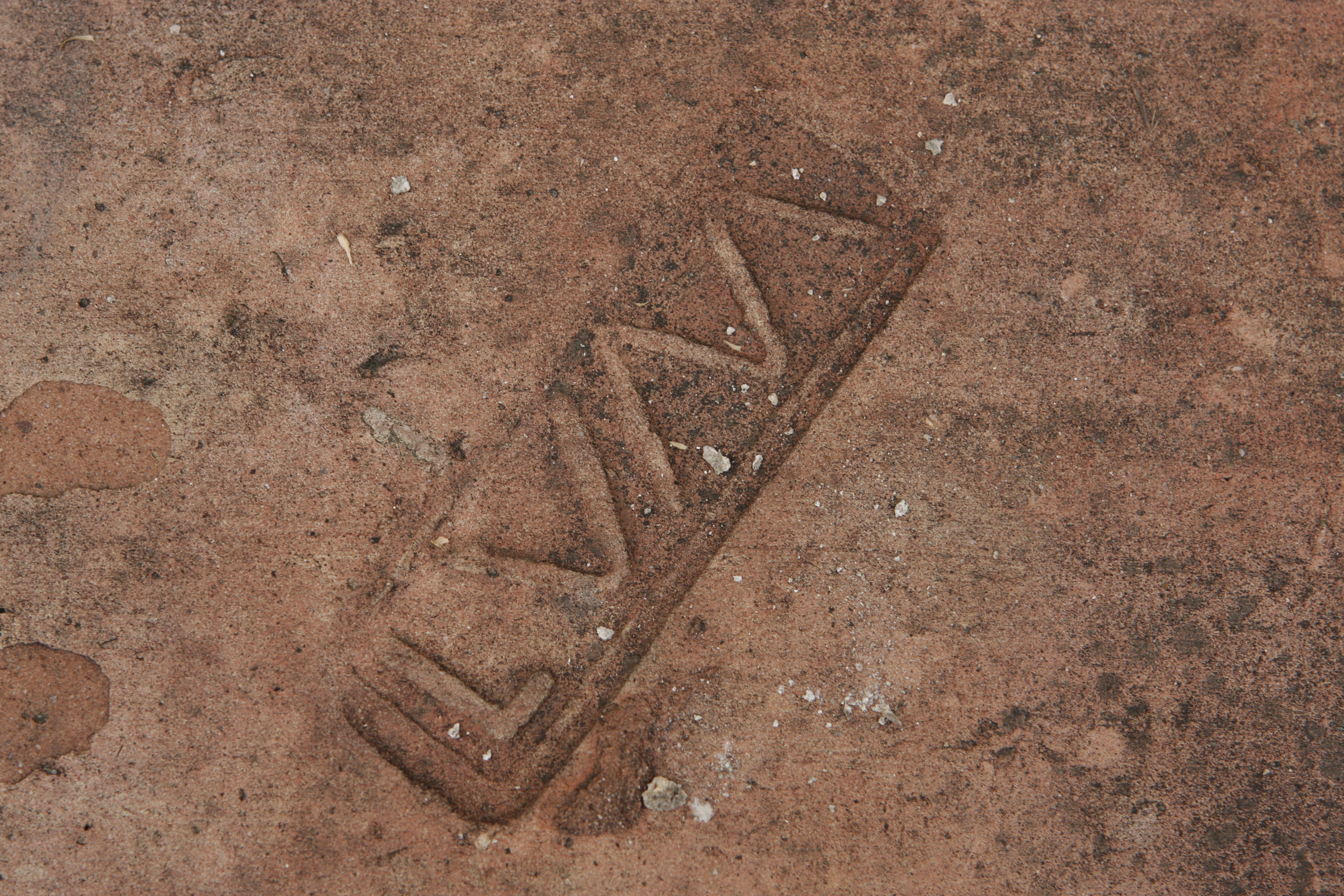
Legio V Macedonica marked brick from Potaissa (modern Turda, Romania)

==== Roman Empire ====
- Lucius Aurelius Verus Augustus and Marcus Ummidius Quadratus Annianus become Roman Consuls.
- The Marcomanni tribe wages war against the Romans at Aquileia. They destroy aqueducts and irrigation conduits. Marcus Aurelius repels the invaders, ending the Pax Romana (Roman Peace) that has kept the Roman Empire free of conflict since the days of Emperor Augustus.
- The Vandals (Astingi and Lacringi) and the Sarmatian Iazyges invade Dacia. To counter them, Legio V Macedonica, returning from the Parthian War, moves its headquarters from Troesmis in Moesia Inferior to Potaissa in Dacia Porolissensis.
- The Germans devastate the Balkans and ransack the sanctuary of Eleusis, near Athens.

==== Asia ====
- Change of era name from Yanxi to Yongkang of the Chinese Han dynasty.
- King Chogo of Baekje wages war against Silla in the Korean peninsula.

=== By place ===
==== Roman Empire ====
- Emperor Marcus Aurelius and his adopted brother Lucius Verus leave Rome, and establish their headquarters at Aquileia.
- The Roman army crosses the Alps into Pannonia, and subdues the Marcomanni at Carnuntum, north of the Danube.

==== Asia ====
- Emperor Ling of Han succeeds Emperor Huan of Han as the emperor of the Chinese Han Dynasty; the first year of the Jianning era.

=== By place ===
==== Roman Empire ====
- Marcomannic Wars: Germanic tribes invade the frontiers of the Roman Empire, specifically the provinces of Raetia and Moesia.
- Northern African Moors invade what is now Spain.
- Marcus Aurelius becomes sole Roman Emperor upon the death of Lucius Verus.
- Marcus Aurelius forces his daughter Lucilla into marriage with Claudius Pompeianus.
- Galen moves back to Rome for good.

==== China ====
- Confucian scholars who had denounced the court eunuchs are arrested, killed or banished from the capital of Luoyang and official life during the second episode of the Disasters of Partisan Prohibitions, which does not formally end until 184 with the onslaught of the Yellow Turban Rebellion.

=== By topic ===
==== Religion ====
- Pertinax succeeds Alypius as bishop of Byzantium.
- Theophilus of Antioch becomes patriarch of Antioch.

==== Arts and sciences ====
- Lucian demonstrates the absurdity of fatalism.

== Significant people ==
- Marcus Aurelius, Roman Emperor
- Lucius Verus, Roman Emperor
- Commodus (b. 161)

== Births ==
160

- Annia Cornificia Faustina Minor, daughter of Marcus Aurelius (d. 212)
- Felician of Foligno, Roman bishop and martyr (d. 250)
- Julia Domna, Roman empress consort (d. 217)
- Marius Maximus, Roman biographer (d. 230)
- Quintus Tineius Sacerdos, Roman politician
- Sextus Empiricus, Greek philosopher (d. 210)

161

- August 31 – Commodus, Roman emperor (d. 192)
- Liu Bei, founder of the Shu Han (Three Kingdoms) (d. 223)
- Lü Dai, general of the Eastern Wu state (Three Kingdoms) (d. 256)

162

- Marcus Annius Verus Caesar, one of Roman emperor Marcus Aurelius's thirteen children (d. 169)

163

- Cui Yan (or Jigui), Chinese official and politician (d. 216)
- Sun Shao (or Changxu), Chinese chancellor (d. 225)
- Tiberius Claudius Severus Proculus, Roman politician
- Xun Yu, Chinese politician and adviser (d. 212)

164

- Bruttia Crispina, Roman empress (d. 191)
- Ge Xuan (or Xiaoxian), Chinese Taoist (d. 244)
- Yu Fan, Chinese scholar and official (d. 233)

165

- Annia Faustina, Roman noblewoman (d. 218)
- Marcus Opellius Severus Macrinus, Roman emperor (d. 218)
- Mi Zhu (or Zizhong), Chinese official and advisor (d. 221)
- Shi Hui, Chinese official and statesman (d. 227)
- Tiberius Claudius Cleobulus, Roman politician (d. 213)

166

- Taishi Ci (or Ziyi), Chinese general (d. 206)

167

- Zhang Yi (or Junsi), Chinese official (d. 230)

168

- Cao Ren, Chinese general (d. 223)
- Gu Yong, Chinese chancellor (d. 243)
- Li Tong, Chinese general (d. 209)

169

- Jingū, Japanese empress and regent (d. 269)
- Zhang Liao, Chinese general (d. 222)

== Deaths ==
160

- Marcion of Sinope, founder of Marcionism (approximate date)
- Suetonius, Roman historian and writer (approximate date)

161

- March 7 – Antoninus Pius, Roman emperor (b. AD 86)
- Athenais, Roman noblewoman (b. AD 143)

162

- Marcus Annius Libo, the second child and first son to Roman consul Marcus Annius Verus and Rupilia Faustina

163

- Kong Zhou, father of Kong Rong (b. 103)
- Marcus Annius Libo, Roman politician

165

- Appian, Greek historian and writer (approximate date)
- Chadea, Korean ruler of Goguryeo (b. AD 71)
- Claudius Ptolemaeus, Greek astronomer (approximate date)
- Deng Mengnü (or Bo Mengnü), Chinese empress
- Elpinice, daughter of Herodes Atticus (b. AD 142)
- Justin Martyr, Christian apologist (b. AD 100)
- Peregrinus Proteus, Greek philosopher (b. AD 95)
- Taejodae, Korean ruler of Goguryeo (b. AD 47)

166

- Celadion, patriarch of Alexandria
- Gaeru of Baekje, Korean ruler
- Laurence, bishop of Byzantium
- Ma Rong, Chinese poet and politician (b. AD 79)

167

- Abercius, bishop of Hieropolis (approximate date)
- Anicetus, pope of Rome (approximate date)
- Wang Fu, Chinese philosopher (b. AD 82)

168

- Anicetus, pope of Rome (approximate date)
- Chen Fan, Chinese official and politician
- Daniel of Padua, Italian bishop and saint
- Dou Wu, Chinese politician and regent
- Huan of Han, Chinese emperor (b. 132)
- Titus Flavius Boethus, Roman politician
- Titus Furius Victorinus, Roman prefect

169

- January 23 – Lucius Verus, Roman emperor (b. 130)
- September 10 – Marcus Annius Verus, Roman co-ruler
- Alypius, bishop of Byzantium (approximate date)
- Li Ying, Chinese scholar and politician
