= 250s =

Decade

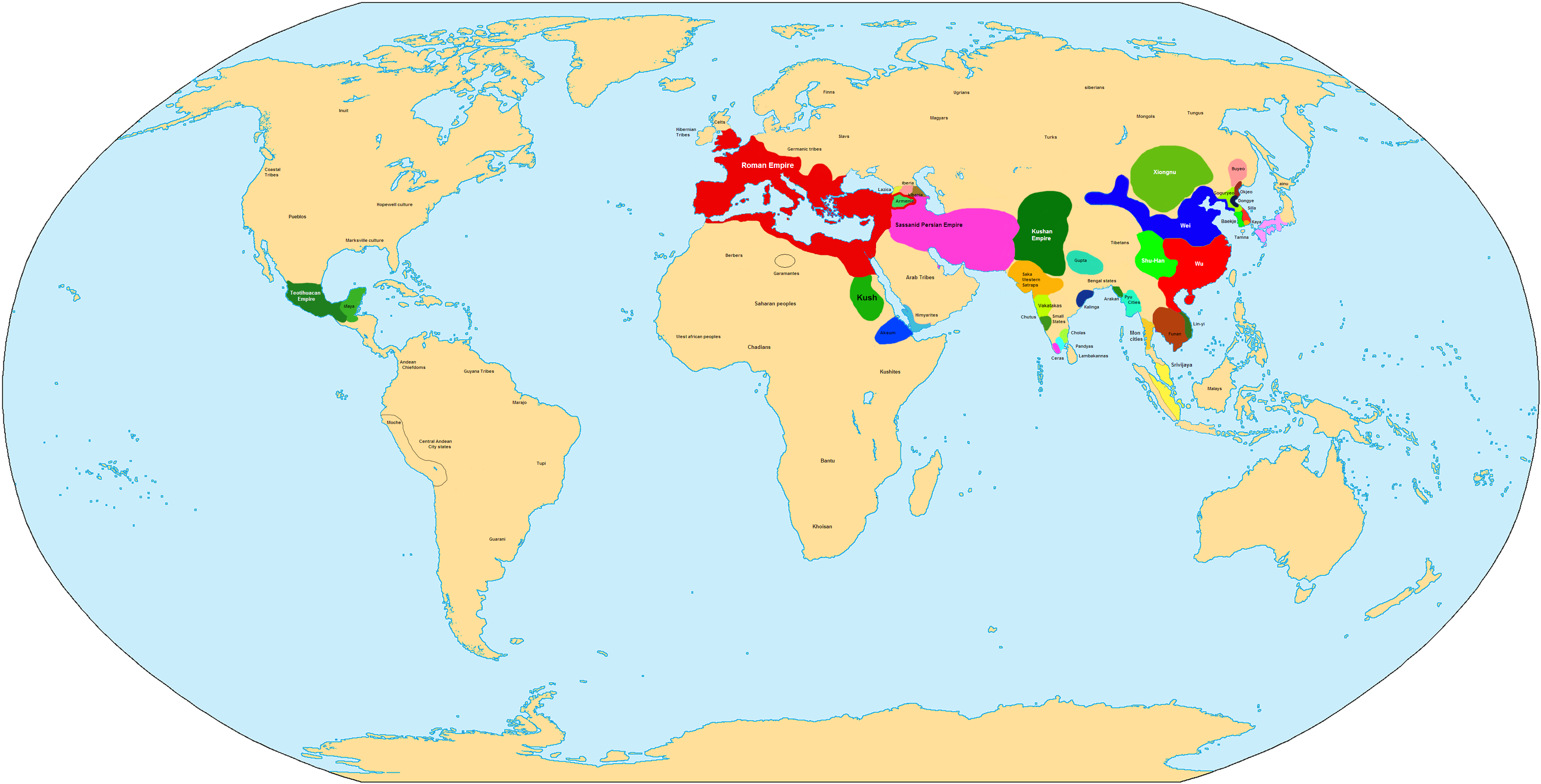
The world in 250

The 250s (pronounced two-fifties or two-hundred and fifties) was a decade that ran from January 1, 250, to December 31, 259.

During this decade, the Roman Empire and China were both in periods of instability with Rome in the Crisis of the Third Century and China in the Three Kingdoms period.

== Events ==
=== 250 ===
==== By place ====
====== Roman Empire ======
- A group of Franks penetrate as far as Tarragona in Spain (approximate date).
- The Goths under King Cniva invade Moesia. They cross the Danube and lay siege to Novae and Marcianopolis.
- Battle of Augusta Traiana: The Romans lose the battle against the Goths.
- Cniva lays siege to Philippopolis (modern Plovdiv). After a long resistance, Cniva conquers the city and slays its one hundred thousand inhabitants.
- The Alamanni drive the Romans from the modern area of Donau-Ries.
- An epidemic begins in Ethiopia, moves into Egypt and the Roman colonies in North Africa, and spreads through the Roman Empire (named the Plague of Cyprian, after St. Cyprian, bishop of Carthage).

====== Africa ======
- The Kingdom of Aksum (Axum) takes control of commerce on the Red Sea.

====== Asia ======
- The earliest Chinese references to a device known as "emperor's south-pointing carriage" date to this period.

====== Mesomerica ======
- Teotihuacán is rebuilt as a four-quartered cosmogram by Zapotec architects brought from Monte Albán in Oaxaca.
- Classic period of Mesoamerican civilization begins.

==== By topic ====
====== Art and science ======
- Diophantus writes Arithmetica, the first systematic treatise on algebra.
- Approximate date
  - The family portrait medallion, traditionally called the Family of Vunnerius Keramus, is made (it is later placed in the Brescia Cross, and then in the Museo Civico dell'Etá Cristiana, Brescia).
  - The Ludovisi Battle sarcophagus, depicting battle between the Romans and the Barbarians, is made for use in Rome (it is later moved to the collection of the National Roman Museum).
  - The Igel Column is erected at Trier in Germany.

====== Religion ======
- January 3 – Decian persecution of Christians is initiated when Emperor Decius orders everyone in the Roman Empire (except Jews) to perform a sacrifice to the gods of religion in ancient Rome. On January 20, Pope Fabian becomes one of the first martyrs of this persecution.
- Possible date – Denis, a bishop of Paris, is martyred by beheading.

=== 251 ===
==== By place ====
====== Roman Empire ======
- July 1 – Battle of Abritus: The Goths defeat Emperor Decius and his son Herennius Etruscus, on swampy ground in the Dobruja (Moesia).
- May – The first Synod of Carthage, a pre-ecumenical council, is held under the presidency of Saint Cyprian.
- In Rome, Hostilian, son of Decius, succeeds his father, while Trebonianus Gallus is proclaimed Emperor by the troops. Gallus accepts him as co-emperor, but an outbreak of plague strikes the city, and kills Hostilian.
- The prosperity of Roman Britain declines during this period, as the Germanic tribes of the Franks and Saxons, whose homelands are in Friesland and the Low Countries, make raids around the southeast coast.
- Gallus makes peace with the Goths; he permits them to keep their plunder, and offers them a bribe not to return.
- A 15-year plague begins in the Roman Empire.

====== Persia ======
- Sassanid King Shapur I orders an invasion of Syria, with the intent of finally capturing the city of Antioch during the campaign of 251–254.

====== China ======
- Wang Ling's rebellion against the Wei regent Sima Yi is quelled.
- Sima Yi passes away in Luoyang.
- Sima Shi, Sima Yi's eldest son, inherits his father's authority.

==== By topic ====
====== Religion ======
- March – Pope Cornelius succeeds Pope Fabian as the 21st pope.

=== 252 ===
==== By place ====
====== Roman Empire ======
- Battle of Barbalissos: King Shapur I defeats the Roman army (some 70,000 men) at Barbalissos in Syria (approximate date).

====== Persia ======
- Shapur I puts down the revolt in Khorasan (Iran and Turkmenistan), and rejoins his army.
- Shapur I invades Armenia, and appoints Artavazd VI as the new Armenian king.
- Georgia submits peacefully to Shapur I, and becomes a vassal of the Sassanid Empire.

====== Asia ======
- Sun Liang succeeds his father Sun Quan, as emperor of the Chinese state of Eastern Wu.

==== By topic ====
====== Religion ======
- Pope Cornelius is exiled to Centumcellae, by Emperor Trebonianus Gallus.

=== 253 ===
==== By place ====
====== Roman Empire ======
- The legions who have campaigned against the Goths on the Danube elect Marcus Aemilius Aemilianus as new emperor. He advances on Rome along the Flaminian Way, to meet his opponent emperor Trebonianus Gallus and his son Volusianus. For the most part, generals in the border regions are proclaimed emperor by their armies to halt the invasion of Germanic tribes.
- Aemilianus is proclaimed "enemy of the State" by the Roman Senate. Trebonianus Gallus is defeated at Interamna Nahars (Umbria); he flees with Volusianus to the north, but at Foligno they are killed by their own troops.
- Aemilianus rules the Roman Empire for three months; he promises to fight in Thrace and goes to war against Persia. The Senate gives him the rank of Pontifex Maximus.
- Aemilianus is murdered at Spoletium and Publius Valerianus, age 60, is recognised as the new emperor by the Rhine legions. He gives his son Publius Licinius Egnatius Gallienus the title Augustus. Valerianus I dispatches him to the Danube where the Goths have violated the treaty signed with Rome and invaded Moesia.
- Valerianus I splits the Roman Empire in two; Gallienus taking control of the West and his father ruling the East, where he faces the Persian threat.
- Battle of Barbalissos: King Shapur I, defeats a Roman field army at Barbalissos in Syria.
- Valerian reforms Legio III Augusta to fight the "five peoples", a dangerous coalition of Berber tribes in Africa.

==== By topic ====
====== Religion ======
- Pope Cornelius is sent into exile.
- June 25 – Pope Lucius I succeeds Pope Cornelius as the 22nd pope.
- Lucius is arrested almost immediately following his election and also exiled.

=== 254 ===
==== By place ====
====== Roman Empire ======
- Publius Licinius Valerianus Augustus and Publius Licinius Egnatius Gallienus become Roman Consuls.
- The Roman Empire is threatened by several peoples on their borders: the Germanic confederations, such as the Franks on the Middle Rhine, the Alemanni on the upper Rhine and Danube, and the Marcomanni facing the provinces at Noricum and Raetia. On land the confederation of Goths threaten the lower Danube provinces, and on the sea they threaten the shores of Thracia, Bithynia et Pontus, and Cappadocia. In the eastern provinces, the Sassanid Persians had the previous year defeated a Roman field army at Barballisos, and afterwards plundered the defenseless provinces. This period of time is called today the Crisis of the Third Century.

==== By topic ====
====== Religion ======
- May 12 – Pope Stephen I succeeds Pope Lucius I.

=== 255 ===
==== By place ====
====== China ======
- Sima Shi quells Guanqiu Jian and Wen Qin's rebellion.
- March 23 – Sima Shi passes away.
- Sima Zhao, Sima Shi's younger brother, inherits his brother's authority.

==== By topic ====
====== Science ======
- Ma Jun, Chinese mechanical engineer from Cao Wei, invents the south-pointing chariot, a path-finding directional compass vehicle that uses a differential gear, not magnetics.

=== 256 ===
==== By place ====
====== Roman Empire ======
- February 28 – Papyrus Oxyrhynchus 3035, a warrant for the arrest of a Christian, is written.
- The Goths invade Asia Minor. Dacia is lost for the Roman Empire, and the Goths appear at the walls of Thessalonica.
- The Franks cross the Rhine; the Alemanni reach Mediolanum (Milan) (disputed date).
- In Africa, the Berbers massacre Roman colonists.
- King Shapur I of the Sasanian Empire invades Mesopotamia and Syria. He conquers and plunders Antioch, destroys Dura-Europos, and sacks the Anatolian city of Zeugma on the Euphrates. A devastating fire and an earthquake soon follow, causing Zeugma to be abandoned.
- Cities in the Roman Empire begin to build walls, as the defense of the frontiers begins to crumble; future emperor Aurelian inspects along the Rhine.

====== Asia ======
- Peace and unity are finally restored in China, with the victories of the Wei Kingdom in the north. The ruling dynasty is worn out by war, and the kingdom is ruled by ministers on their behalf.

==== By topic ====
====== Medicine ======
- The great pandemic of the Roman world strikes violently in Pontus on the Black Sea, and causes enormous loss of life in Alexandria, encouraging thousands to embrace Christianity.

====== Religion ======
- Emperor Valerian persecutes Christians.
- Pope Stephen I threatens to excommunicate Cyprian, bishop of Carthage, and other bishops in Africa and Asia Minor, unless they stop rebaptizing heretics. Cyprian attacks the Pope in a treatise that gains support from the Council of Carthage. He sends envoys to Rome, raising the specter of a schism between the Roman and Carthaginian Churches.
- A Synod of Carthage is held.

=== 257 ===
==== By place ====
====== Roman Empire ======
- Gallienus enters into a joint consulship with his father Valerianus I, having brought some order to the Danube area.
- Future emperor Aurelian defeats the Goths and brings many prisoners back to Rome.
- In Bavaria the Limes Germanicus (Upper Raetian Limes) along the river Iller is abandoned by the Romans.
- Valerian, under guardianship of Ingenuus, is established at Sirmium (Pannonia) to represent the Roman government in the troubled Illyrian provinces.
- Emperor Valerian recovers Antioch, Syria from King Shapur I of Persia.
- The Goths build a fleet on the Black Sea.
- The Goths separate into the Ostrogoths and the Visigoths.

==== By topic ====
====== Religion ======
- August 30 – Pope Sixtus II succeeds Pope Stephen I as the 24th pope.
- Valerian's persecution of Christians begins: his edict orders bishops and priests to sacrifice according to the pagan rituals, and prohibits Christians, under penalty of death, from meeting at the tombs of their deceased.

=== 258 ===
==== By place ====
====== Roman Empire ======
- The Goths ravage Asia Minor and Trapezus.
- The amount of silver in the Roman currency of the denarius falls below 10%. The crisis ruins craftsmen, tradesmen, and small farmers, who are forced into bartering; landowners grow richer by buying up cheap land.
- Valerian II, eldest son of Gallienus, dies, possibly murdered by Pannonia's governor Ingenuus; Emperor Valerian bestows on another one of Gallienus's sons, Saloninus, the title of Caesar.
- A second Imperial edict prohibits Christianity in the Roman Empire. This edict divides Christians into four categories: priests, who are to be put to death; senators and equestrians, who are to be stripped of their positions and their property confiscated; nuns, who are to be exiled; and imperial civil servants, who are condemned to forced labour.

====== Asia ======
- Sima Zhao quells Zhuge Dan's rebellion, thereby also ending what are known as the Three Rebellions in Shouchun.
- Sun Xiu succeeds his brother Sun Liang as emperor of the Chinese state of Eastern Wu.

==== By topic ====
====== Religion ======
- Cyprian, bishop of Carthage, is martyred (decapitation).
- Pope Sixtus II, bishop of Rome, is martyred.

=== 259 ===
==== By place ====
====== Roman Empire ======
- Emperor Valerian leads an army (70,000 men) to relieve Edessa, besieged by the forces of Persian King Shapur I. An outbreak of a plague kills many legionaries, weakening the Roman position in Syria.
- Battle of Mediolanum: A Germanic confederation, the Alamanni (300,000 warriors), who crossed the Alps, are defeated by Roman legions under Gallienus, near Mediolanum (modern Milan).
- Postumus revolts against Gallienus in Gaul. The western provinces of Britain and Spain join his independent realm—which is called in modern times the Gallic Empire.
- Postumus, governor of Gaul, declares himself Emperor, and continues to rule the Gallic Empire until 269, when he is killed by his soldiers.
- The Roman fort of Wiesbaden (Germany) is captured by the Alamanni (possibly 260).
- The Franks, who invaded the Roman Empire near Cologne in 257, reach Tarraco in Hispania.

====== Persia ======
- Mesopotamia: Odaenathus, the ruler of the kingdom of Palmyra, sacks the city of Nehardea, destroying its great yeshiva.

==== By topic ====
====== Religion ======
- Pope Dionysius is elected as the pope.

== Births ==
250

- March 31 – Constantius Chlorus, Roman emperor (d. 306)
- Gaius Galerius Valerius Maximianus, Roman emperor (d. 311)
- Lu Jing (or Shiren), Chinese general and writer (d. 280)
- Maximian (Herculius), Roman consul and emperor (d. 310)
- Zuo Si (or Taichong), Chinese poet and writer (d. 305)

251

- January 12 – Anthony the Great, Christian monk and saint (d. 356)

252

- Eusignius of Antioch, Roman general and martyr (d. 362)
- Wang Jun (or Pengzu), Chinese general and warlord (d. 314)
- Wei Huacun, founder of the Shangqing sect of Daoism (d. 334)

255

- January 6 – Marcellus I, bishop of Rome (d. 309)
- Dorotheus of Tyre, Syrian bishop and martyr (d. 362)
- Zhang Gui, Chinese governor of the Jin Dynasty (d. 314)
- Zuo Fen, Chinese poet of the Western Jin Dynasty (d. 300)
- Saint Helena, Roman empress who was the reputed discoverer of Christ’s cross and mother of Emperor Constantine (d. 318)

256

- Arius, Egyptian priest and founder of Arianism (d. 336)
- Wang Yan (or Yifu), Chinese official and politician (d. 311)

257

- Gregory the Illuminator, Armenian religious leader (approximate date)
- Jia Nanfeng (or Shi), Chinese empress (d. 300)

258

- Clement of Ancyra, Christian bishop and martyr (d. 312)

259

- Hui of Jin, Chinese emperor of the Jin Dynasty (d. 307)
- Tao Kan (or Shixing), Chinese general and politician (d. 334)
- Yang Zhi, Chinese empress of the Jin Dynasty (d. 292)

== Deaths ==
250

- January 20 – Fabian (or Fabianus), pope of Rome and martyr
- Du Qiong (or Boyu), Chinese official and astronomer
- Faustus, Abibus and Dionysius, Christian martyrs
- Marcus Minucius Felix, Roman apologist and writer
- Peter, Andrew, Paul and Denise, Christian martyrs
- Secundian, Marcellian and Verian, Christian martyrs
- Tryphon, Respicius, and Nympha, Christian martyrs
- Zhu Ju, Chinese general and chancellor (b. 194)

251

- February 5 – Cao Lin, Chinese prince of the Cao Wei state
- June – August
  - Decius, Roman emperor (killed after the battle of Abritus)
  - Herennius Etruscus, Roman emperor and son of Decius
- June 15 – Wang Ling, Chinese general and politician
- August 22 – Zhen, Chinese empress of the Cao Wei state
- September 7 – Sima Yi, Chinese general and regent (b. 179)
- Agatha of Sicily, Christian martyr and saint (approximate date)
- Cao Biao, Chinese prince of the Cao Wei state (b. 195)
- Deng Zhi, Chinese general, politician and diplomat
- Hostilian, Roman emperor (of plague in Rome)
- Lü Yi, Chinese official, governor and politician

252

- May 21 – Sun Quan, founder of the Eastern Wu state (b. 182)
- Pan (or Pan Shu), Chinese empress of the Eastern Wu state
- Tian Yu (or Guorang), Chinese general and politician (b. 171)
- Tiridates II (or Khosrov), Roman client king of Armenia

253

- Aemilianus, Roman emperor
- Pope Cornelius
- Saint Babylas, Patriarch of Antioch
- Fei Yi, Chinese statesman, general and regent of the Shu Han state
- Sun He, Chinese prince of the Eastern Wu state (b. 224)
- Trebonianus Gallus, Roman emperor
- Volusianus, Roman emperor
- Zhuge Ke, Chinese general and regent of the Eastern Wu state (b. 203)
- Origen, a Christian scholar from Alexandria (b. c. 184)

254

- March 5 – Lucius I, bishop of Rome
- Li Feng (or Anguo), Chinese official and politician
- Tiberius Julius Pharsanzes, Roman client king
- Xiahou Xuan (or Taichu), Chinese general and politician (b. 209)
- Zhang Ni (or Boqi), Chinese general, official and politician

255

- February 23 – Guo Huai (or Boji), Chinese general
- March 16 – Guanqiu Jian, Chinese general and politician
- March 23 – Sima Shi, Chinese general and regent (b. 208)
- Fu Gu (or Lanshi), Chinese official and politician (b. 209)
- Liu Zan (or Zhengming), Chinese general (b. 183)
- Sun Luyu (or Xiaohu), Chinese princess

256

- March 11 – Cao Lin, Chinese prince and son of Cao Cao
- October 19 – Sun Jun (or Ziyuan), Chinese general and regent (b. 219)
- October 21 – Lü Dai (or Dinggong), Chinese general (b. 161)
- November 12 – Lü Ju (or Shiyi), Chinese general and politician
- Guan Lu (or Gongming), Chinese diviner and politician (b. 209)
- Wang Su (or Ziyong), Chinese scholar and official (b. 195)

257

- August 2 – Stephen I, bishop of Rome
- September 26 – Zhu Yi (or Jiwen), Chinese general
- Wen Qin (or Zhongruo), Chinese general and politician
- Zhang Changpu, Chinese concubine (b. 199)

258

- August 6 – Sixtus II, bishop of Rome
- September 14 – Cyprian, bishop of Carthage
- Anak the Parthian, Parthian nobleman
- Chen Zhi (or Fengzong), Chinese politician
- Novatian, Italian antipope and theologian
- Valerian II, son of co-emperor Gallienus
- Zhuge Dan (or Gongxiu), Chinese general

259

- January 10 – Polyeuctus, Roman soldier and saint
- January 18 – Sun Chen, Chinese general and regent (b. 232)
- Augurius of Tarragona, Christian Hispano-Roman clergyman
- Cao Jun (or Zi'an), Chinese prince and son of Cao Cao
- Fructuosus of Tarragona, Christian bishop, martyr and saint
- Wang Chang (or Wenshu), Chinese general and politician
