= 1st millennium =

Millennium spanning the years 1 to 1000

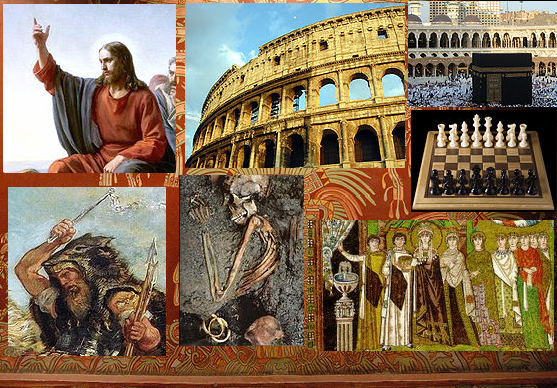
From top left, clockwise: Depiction of Jesus, the central figure in Christianity; The Colosseum, a landmark of the once-mighty Roman Empire; Kaaba, the Great Mosque of Mecca, the holiest site of Islam; Chess, a new board game, becomes popular around the globe; The Western Roman Empire falls, ushering in the Early Middle Ages; The skeletal remains of a young woman, known as the "ring lady", killed by the eruption of Mount Vesuvius in AD 79; Attila the Hun, leader of the Hunnic Empire, which takes most of Eastern Europe (Background: Reproduction of ancient mural from Teotihuacan, National Museum of Anthropology, Mexico City)

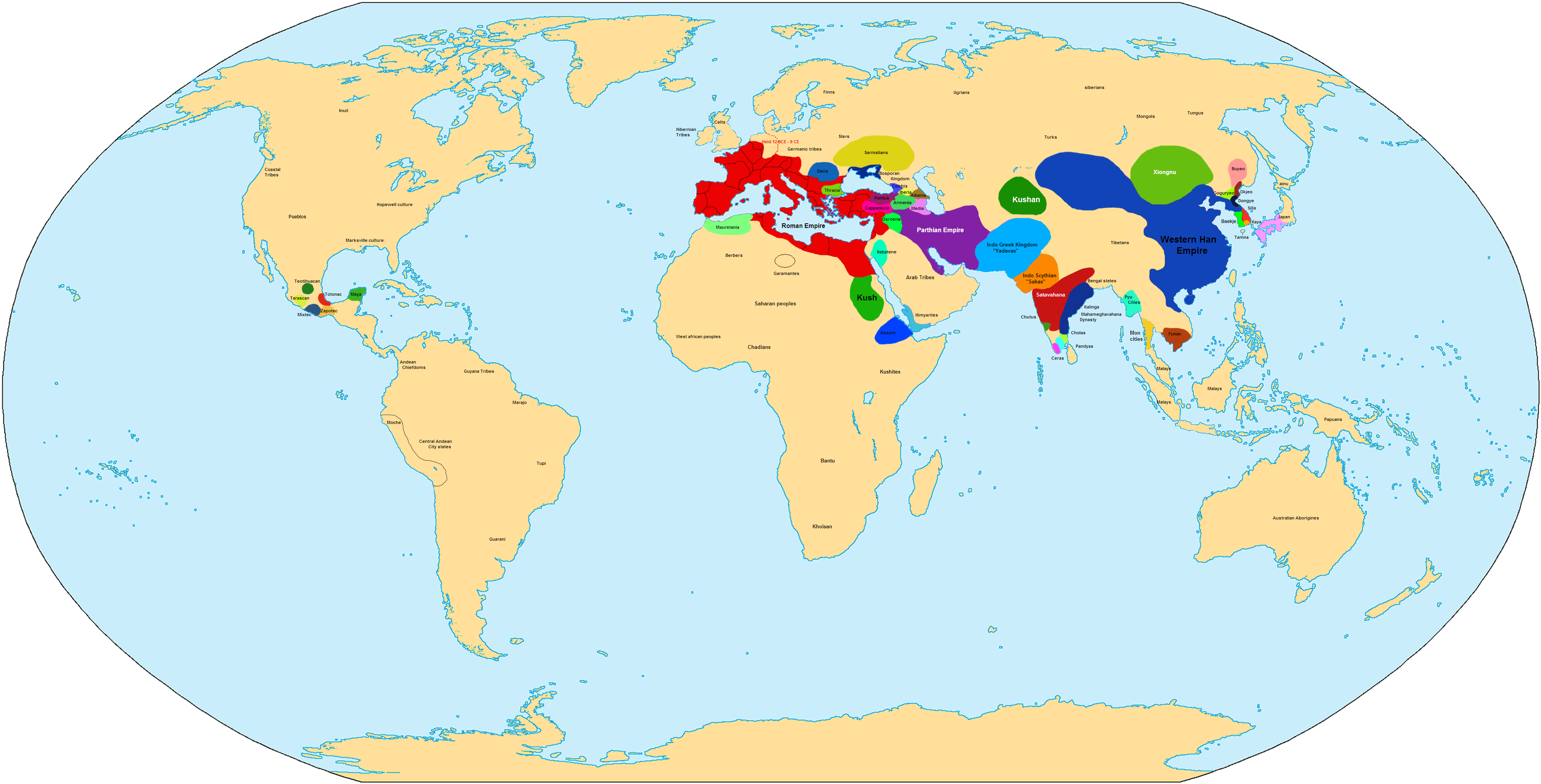
Map of the world in 1 AD, at the beginning of the new millennium.

The first millennium of the Christian or Common Era was a millennium spanning the years 1 to 1000 (1st to 10th centuries; in astronomy: JD 1721425.5 – 5.676 67). The world population rose more slowly than during the preceding millennium, from about 200 million in the year 1 to about 300 million in the year 1000.

In Western Eurasia (Europe and Near East), the first millennium was a time of great transition from Classical Antiquity to the Middle Ages. The 1st century saw the peak of the Roman Empire, followed by its gradual decline during the period of Late Antiquity, the rise of Christianity and the Great Migrations. The second half of the millennium is characterized as the Early Middle Ages in Europe, and marked by the Viking expansion in the west, and the continuation of the Byzantine Empire (Eastern Roman Empire) in the east.

The latter half of the first millennium also saw the prominent rise of Islam in Arabia with its influence later expanding across a vast area spanning from Sindh in the Indian subcontinent and western Asia to North Africa and the Iberian Peninsula, ushering in the Islamic Golden Age (c. 8th–14th century).

In East Asia, the first millennium was also a time of great cultural advances, notably the spread of Buddhism to East Asia. In China, the Han dynasty is replaced by the Jin dynasty and later the Tang dynasty until the 10th century sees renewed fragmentation in the Five Dynasties and Ten Kingdoms period. In Japan, a sharp increase in population followed when farmers' use of iron tools increased their productivity and crop yields. The Yamato court was established. The North Indian subcontinent was divided among numerous kingdoms throughout the first millennium, until the formation of the Gupta Empire.

In Mesoamerica, the first millennium was a period of enormous growth known as the Classic Era (200–900). Teotihuacan grew into a metropolis and its empire dominated Mesoamerica. In South America, pre-Incan, coastal cultures flourished, producing impressive metalwork and some of the finest pottery seen in the ancient world. In North America, the Mississippian culture rose at the end of the millennium in the Mississippi and Ohio river valleys. Numerous cities were built; Cahokia, the largest, was based in present-day Illinois. The construction of Monks Mound at Cahokia was begun in 900–950.

In Sub-Saharan Africa, the Bantu expansion reaches Southern Africa by about the 5th century. The trans-Saharan slave trade spans the Sahara and the Swahili coast by the 9th century.

== Civilizations, kingdoms and dynasties ==
Kingdoms and civilizations of the 1st millennium AD
| Africa | Asia / Oceania | Europe | Pre-Columbian Americas |
|---|---|---|---|
| North Africa: Roman/Byzantine Empire (31 BC – AD 698); Vandal Kingdom (435–534); Rashidun Caliphate (632–661); Umayyad Caliphate (661–750); Abbasid Caliphate (750–1258); Idrisid dynasty (788–974); Tulunid Emirate of Egypt (868–905); Ikhshidid Emirate of Egypt (935–969); Fatimid Caliphate (909–1171); East Africa: Himyarite Kingdom (110 BC – 940); Kingdom of Aksum (c. 100–940); Christian Nubia (c. 350–1500); Harla Kingdom (after c. 500); Savanna Pastoral Neolithic (before c. 700); Bantu expansion; Pastoral Iron Age (after c. 700); Sultanate of Mogadishu (after c. 800); Sultanate of Shewa (896–1286); Sahara / West Africa: Pastoral Neolithic; Ghana Empire (3rd century–1240); Kanem Empire (c. 700–); Kingdom of Nri (948–); Central / Southern Africa: Bantu expansion; Late Stone Age rock art: Bidzar (Cameroon); Matobo National Park rock art (Zimbabwe); Nyero rock paintings (Uganda) | West Asia: Kingdom of Armenia (331 BC – AD 428); Kingdom of Iberia (302 BC – AD 580); Parthian Empire (247 BC – AD 224); Roman/Byzantine Empire (27 BC – 1453); Sassanid Empire (226–651); Principality of Iberia (588–888); Rashidun Caliphate (632–661); Umayyad Caliphate (661–750); Abbasid Caliphate (750–1258); Principality of Tao-Klarjeti (813–1008); East Asia: Han dynasty (206 BC – AD 220); Goguryeo (37 BC – AD 668); Buyeo (150 BC - AD 494); Baekje (18 BC - AD 660); Silla (57 BC - AD 935); Jin dynasty (266–420); Three Kingdoms (220–280); Sixteen Kingdoms (304–439); Northern and Southern dynasties (420–589); Sui dynasty (581–618); Tang dynasty (618–907); Balhae (698–926); Liao dynasty (907–1125); Song dynasty (960–1279); Central Asia Further information: Cities along the Silk Road and Silk Road transmission of Buddhism: Zhangzhung (500 BC – AD 625); Xiongnu (1st century); Kushan Empire (30–375); Xianbei state (Mongols) (–234); Hephthalite Empire (440s–670); Rouran Khaganate (330–555); Yenisei Kyrgyz (539–1219); Göktürks (552–744); Tibetan Empire (618–842); Volga Bulgaria (660-1240); Muslim conquest of Transoxiana (673–751); Uyghur Khaganate (744–840); Oghuz Yabgu State (766–1055); Kimek–Kipchak confederation (880–1200); South Asia: Indo-Scythians (c. 150 BC – 400); Indo-Parthian Kingdom (12 BC – 130); Kushan Empire (30–375); Gupta Empire (280–590); Varman dynasty (350–655); Pushyabhuti dynasty (500–647); Maukhari dynasty (550–800); Kalachuri dynasty (550–625); Later Guptas (590–700); Rashtrakuta dynasty (753–982); Chola dynasty (300–1279); Pala Empire (750–1162); Southeast Asia Further information: Indianization of Southeast Asia: Srivijaya (650–1377); Oceania: Austronesian expansion; Tuʻi Tonga Empire (950s–1865) | Southeastern Europe: Roman/Byzantine Empire (27 BC – 1453); Slavic expansion (500–800); Bulgarian Empire (682–1018); Italy: Roman Empire (27 BC – 480); Byzantine Empire (584–1071); Kingdom of the Lombards (568–774); Republic of Venice (697-); Carolingian Empire (751-843); Papal States (754–); Holy Roman Empire (962–1806); Iberia: Roman Empire (27 BC – 480); Kingdom of the Suebi (409–585); Visigothic Kingdom (418–720); Umayyad Caliphate (711–750); Umayyad state of Córdoba (756–1031); Kingdom of Asturias (720–910); Kingdom of León (910–1230); Western / Central Europe: Germanic expansion (c. 100 BC – AD 400); Roman Empire (27 BC – 480); Early Christian Ireland (400–800); Sub-Roman Britain (410-597); Anglo-Saxon England (c. 500–1066); Francia (511–751); Duchy of Bavaria (555–); Samo's Empire (631–658); Carolingian Empire (751-843); Great Moravia (833-907); West Francia (843–987); East Francia (843–962); Duchy of Bohemia (870–1198); Principality of Hungary (895-1000); Kingdom of Croatia (925–); Kingdom of England (927–); Holy Roman Empire (962–1806); Capetian France (987–); Eastern Europe: Sarmatia (c. 467 BC – AD 370); Bosporan Kingdom (438 BC – AD 370); Roman Crimea (47 BC – AD 340); Goths (c. 200–370); Alans (c. 200–370); Hunnic Empire (370s–469); First Turkic Khaganate (6th century); Avar Khaganate (567 – after 822); Khazar Khaganate (650–969); Volga Bulgaria (660-1240); Kievan Rus' (882–1240); Northern Europe: Roman Iron Age (1–500); Vendel Period (550–790); Viking Age (790–1066); Kingdom of Norway (872–) | Mesoamerica: Zapotec; Maya civilization (250–900); Teotihuacan (550–); Toltec (c. 900–1168); Teuchitlan; Kaan Kingdom; South America: Lima culture (c. 100 – c. 650); Moche culture (c. 100–700); Tiwanaku empire (c. 300–1150); Wari culture (c. 500–1000); Cara culture (c. 800 – ?); Tairona (c. 900 – ?); North America: Woodland period; Hopewell tradition; Baytown culture; Plum Bayou culture; Troyville culture; Mississippian culture (c. 800–1600); Dorset culture; Thule tradition; Norse Greenland (985 – 15th century) |

== Events ==
The events in this section are organized according to the United Nations geoscheme

Events and trends of the 1st millennium AD
| | Africa | Americas | Asia | Europe | Oceania |
|---|---|---|---|---|---|
| 1st century | AD 70 Amanikhatashan sends Kushite cavalry to aid Roman Emperor in Jerusalem revolt AD 100 Rise of the Kingdom of Aksum; AD 100 Khoekhoe reach southern coast of Africa | AD 1 Cahuachi established AD 50 Pyramid of the Sun began | AD 25 Han dynasty reestablished under Guangwu; AD 33 Christianity begins AD 70 Jewish diaspora | AD 9 Rhine established as boundary between Rome and Germany; AD 47 Londinium founded AD 58 Alpes Cottiae becomes a Roman province AD 79 Pompeii destroyed | AD 1 Caroline Islands colonized |
| 2nd century | 150 Rhapta, hint of pre-Swahili, Periplus of the Erythraean Sea; 172 Bucolic War out breaks in Egypt against Roman rule 200 Bantu reach east Africa; 200 Nok culture ends | 150 Cahuachi becomes dominant ceremonial site in southern Peru | 184 Yellow Turban Rebellion | 106 Dacia becomes a Roman province 166 Siege of Aquileia; 180 End of the Macromannic Wars | |
| 3rd century | 212 Egyptians granted Roman citizenship 215 Alexandrian revolts in Egypt; 230 Aksum wars with Himyar and Saba alliance 292 Revolts erupt in Egypt against Roman rule 300 Kingdom of Aksum prints own coins | 250 Rise of Laguna de los Cerros; 292 Stela 29 inscribed 300 Tikàl conquers El Mirador | 208 Battle of Red Cliffs during the decline of the Han dynasty 280 Jin reunifies China | 212 Roman citizenship extended to all free people in the empire 214 Hispania divided into Gallaecia, Tarraconensis, Baetica and Lusitania; 286 Diocletian divides the empire East and West | 300 Eastern Polynesian culture develops |
| 4th century | 333 Aksum converts to Christianity; 350 Meroe comes to an end 350 King of Anwar, Kaja Maja | 378 Teotihuacan conquers Waka, Tikal, and Uaxactun, the beginning of its conquest of the Maya | 319 Rise of Gupta Empire in South Asia; 383 Battle of Fei River; 393 Last Olympic Games | 313 Edict of Milan; 370 Huns invade Eastern Europe; 396 Alaric and the Visigoths invade Greece | |
| 5th century | 401 c. camel main transport for trans-Sahara; 429 Vandal invasion 480 Egyptians rose in revolt against attempts to suppress the cult of Isis; 500 Nubia split into Nobadia, Makuria, Alodia | | 420 Northern and Southern dynasties period begins | 407 Vandals enter Iberia; 421 Romans defeat Persians; 476 Fall of the Western Roman Empire | 500 Settlement of Hawaii, Easter Island, Society Islands, Tuamotus and Mangareva |
| 6th century | 520 Kaleb attacks Yemen; 533 Belisarius invades Africa; 540 Nubia converts to monophysite Christianity; 582 Egyptians revolt led by Abaskiron against the Byzantine rule | 600 Wari' conquer Peru; 600 Construction of Palenque | 538 Buddhism introduced in Japan. 570 Birth of the Islamic prophet Muhammad | 507 Battle of Vouillé; 535 Byzantine army invades Italy; 585 Visigoths conquer Suevi kingdom | |
| 7th century | 641 Muslims invade Africa; 690 Za dynasty founded 697 Carthage destroyed | 650 Settlement of Xochitecatl and Cacaxtla; 700 Teotihuacan destroyed | 618 Tang dynasty established 632 Rise of Islam; 651 Islamic conquest of Persia | c.680 First Bulgarian Empire is founded | 700 Settlement of the Cook Islands |
| 8th century | 702 Aksum attacks Arabia; 706 Medieval Egypt; 720 Bashmurian revolts erupt in Egypt against Arab rule 789 Independent Morocco | 738 Quiriguá becomes independent of Copan 750 Sacred Cenote built at Chichén Itzá; 780 Murals at Bonampak abandoned | 738 Caliphate campaigns in India and invasion of India by Umayyad Caliphate is averted 755 An Shi Rebellion | 717 Siege of Constantinople; 718 Muslim conquest of the Iberian Peninsula c.722 Reconquista begins | |
| 9th century | 801 c. Kanem Empire founded 801c. Aksum declines, capital moved to interior 868 Tulunids come to power, Egypt gains independence from Abbasid rule 900c. Igbo-Ukwu founded | c.830 Classic Maya collapse | 835 Ganlu Incident | 872 Battle of Hafrsfjord helped unified Norway c.874 Settlement of Iceland; 896 Hungarian conquest of the Carpathian Basin | |
| 10th century | 905 Tulunids ejected 909 Fatimid established 969 Fustat captured 973 Cairo becomes new Egyptian capital, and seat of the Caliphate | 950 Great Serpent Mound constructed 990 Toltecs conquer Chichen Itza | 907 Political upheaval of the Five Dynasties begins 960 Song dynasty established | 958 Denmark unites 985 Erik the Red founds colony in Greenland | AD 1000 Polynesians build stone temples |

== Inventions, discoveries, introductions ==
Inventions, discoveries and introductions
| Communication | Math and Science | Agriculture | Transportation | Warfare |
|---|---|---|---|---|
| 1. Woodblock printing 2. Paper; 3. Quipu | 1. Algebra; 2. Ptolemaic system 3. Wootz steel | 1. Coffee; 2. Hops | 1. Horseshoe; 2. Stirrup; 3. Magnetic compass | 1. Greek fire 2. Gunpowder |

== Centuries and decades ==
| 1st century | 0s | 10s | 20s | 30s | 40s | 50s | 60s | 70s | 80s | 90s |
| 2nd century | 100s | 110s | 120s | 130s | 140s | 150s | 160s | 170s | 180s | 190s |
| 3rd century | 200s | 210s | 220s | 230s | 240s | 250s | 260s | 270s | 280s | 290s |
| 4th century | 300s | 310s | 320s | 330s | 340s | 350s | 360s | 370s | 380s | 390s |
| 5th century | 400s | 410s | 420s | 430s | 440s | 450s | 460s | 470s | 480s | 490s |
| 6th century | 500s | 510s | 520s | 530s | 540s | 550s | 560s | 570s | 580s | 590s |
| 7th century | 600s | 610s | 620s | 630s | 640s | 650s | 660s | 670s | 680s | 690s |
| 8th century | 700s | 710s | 720s | 730s | 740s | 750s | 760s | 770s | 780s | 790s |
| 9th century | 800s | 810s | 820s | 830s | 840s | 850s | 860s | 870s | 880s | 890s |
| 10th century | 900s | 910s | 920s | 930s | 940s | 950s | 960s | 970s | 980s | 990s |
