= 200s (decade) =

Decade

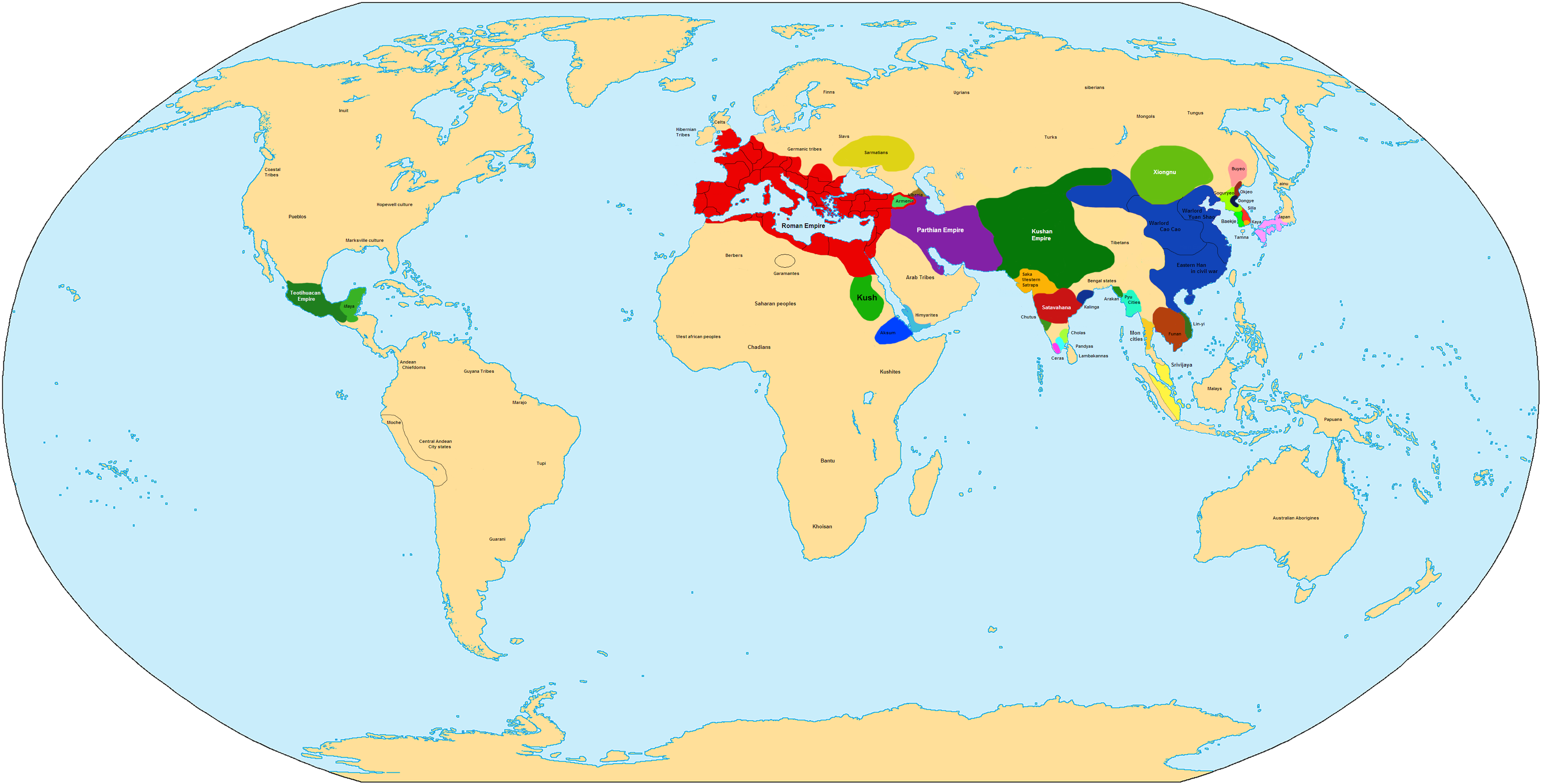
The world in 200

The 200s decade ran from January 1, 200, to December 31, 209.

The world population is estimated to be between 190 to 256 million in 200. In the Roman Empire, Septimius Severus is emperor for the whole decade. After the Yellow Turban Rebellion in China, the Han dynasty weakens as warlord seize control of China, even though Emperor Xian is in power for the whole decade. Cao Cao defeats Yuan Shao at the Battle of Cangting, eventually unifying northern China. Around this time, Brahmanism morphs into Hinduism. Caracalla and Geta are set up to heirs to Septimius Severus, and they both are Augusti by the end of the decade.

== Events ==
=== 200 ===
==== By place ====
====== World ======
- Human population reaches about 257 million.

====== Roman Empire ======
- Emperor Septimius Severus visits the provinces of Syria, Palestine, and Arabia.
- The province of Numidia is taken from the African proconsul, and made an Imperial province.

====== India ======
- Rudrasena I, Saka ruler of the Western Satrap dynasty, becomes king of Malwa in Classical India.

====== China ======
- September-November - Battle of Guandu: Chinese warlord Cao Cao defeats his rival Yuan Shao.
- In Jiaozhi (present-day northern Vietnam), a rebellion broke out among the locals, who killed Inspector Zhu Fu due to his corruption.

====== Japan ======
- In Japan, Himiko, whose capital is situated in Yamatai, extends her authority over a number of clans.

====== America ======
- The Classic Age of Maya civilization begins (around this year).
- The Paracas culture in the Andes ends (around this year).

==== By topic ====
====== Art ======
- The Severan Tondo, depicting Septimius Severus, Julia Domna and their children Geta and Caracalla, from Fayum, Egypt, is made. It is now kept at Staatliche Museen zu Berlin, Preußischer Kulturbesitz, Antikensammlung.

====== Religion ======
- Jewish Eretz Yisraeli scholar Judah ha-Nasi compiles tracts of the Mishnah, creating Talmudic law.
- Clement of Alexandria denounces the use of musical instruments instead of human voices in Christian music.
- Brahmanism evolves into Hinduism (approximate date).

=== 201 ===
==== By place ====
====== Roman Empire ======
- Lucius Annius Fabianus and Marcus Nonius Arrius Mucianus become Roman Consuls.

====== China ======
- Battle of Cangting: Warlord Cao Cao defeats his rival, Yuan Shao.

==== By topic ====
====== Religion ======
- November – A flood in Edessa destroys a Christian church, killing over 2,000 people.

=== 202 ===
==== By place ====
====== Roman Empire ======
- Emperor Septimius Severus returns to Rome after a five-year absence. Festivals are held to celebrate his six-year reign. Severus undertakes changes in the imperial government, giving the Roman army a dominant role, raising pay in the legions and permitting legionaries to marry in order to secure their loyalty.
- Rome is a city of about 1.5 million citizens, its people housed mostly in 46,600 insulae or apartment blocks, each three to eight stories high, flimsily made of wood, brick or rubble.
- Some 400,000 slaves perform the menial work of Rome, with middle-class citizens often owning eight; the rich from 500 to 1,000; an emperor as many as 20,000. Free urban workers enjoy 17 to 18 hours of leisure each day, with free admission to baths, sport events and gladiatorial games.
- Severus launches a campaign in Africa; Legio III Augusta under Quintus Anicius Faustus fights a guerrilla war against the Garamantes along the Limes Tripolitanus. They capture several settlements such as Cydamus, Gholaia and their capital Garama, 600 km south of Lepcis Magna. The province of Numidia is enlarged: the Romans annex Castellum Dimmidi, Gemellae and Vescera.
- An edict bans conversions to Christianity and all Christian propaganda.
- A Roman law bans female gladiators.
- The Pantheon is restored.

====== China ======
- Battle of Bowang: Warlord Liu Bei defeats Cao Cao's forces under Xiahou Dun.

==== By topic ====
====== Religion ======
- In order to avoid Septimus Severus' persecution of Christians, Clement of Alexandria seeks refuge with Alexander in Cappadocia.

=== 203 ===
==== By place ====
====== Roman Empire ======
- Emperor Septimius Severus rebuilds Byzantium, and expands the southern frontier of Africa, with the metropolis Carthage re-fortified.
- Gaius Fulvius Plautianus and Publius Septimius Geta become Roman Consuls.
- An arch dedicated to Septimius Severus is erected near the Forum.
- The Portico of Octavia is reconstructed.

====== India ======
- Prince Vijaya becomes king of the Andhra Empire. During his reign, the empire is broken apart into smaller independent principalities.

====== China ======
- Battle of Xiakou: Warlord Sun Quan battles his rival Huang Zu along the Yangtze River near Wuhan.

==== By topic ====
====== Religion ======
- Origen of Alexandria replaces Clement as the head of the Christian school in Alexandria.

=== 204 ===
==== By place ====
====== Roman Empire ======
- Lucius Fabius Cilo and Marcus Annius Flavius Libo become Roman Consuls.
- The Daysan River floods Edessa.

====== China ======
- Gongsun Kang, Chinese warlord of Liaodong, establishes the Daifang Commandery in northern Korea.
- Battle of Ye: Warlord Cao Cao lays siege to and captures the military headquarter of Yuan Shao in Ye.

==== By topic ====
====== Commerce ======
- A trade recession in the Leptis Magna region (Africa) is alleviated by Emperor Septimius Severus, who buys up the country's olive oil for free distribution in Rome.

=== 205 ===
==== By place ====
====== Roman Empire ======
- Marcus Aurelius Antoninus Augustus and his brother Publius Septimius Geta Caesar become Roman Consuls.
- Hadrian's Wall is restored, after heavy raids by Caledonian tribes had overrun much of northern Britain.
- January 22 – Gaius Fulvius Plautianus, a praetorian prefect and father-in-law of Caracalla, is assassinated.
- Aemilius Papinianus becomes praetorian prefect, after the death of Gaius Fulvius Plautianus.

====== China ======
- Battle of Nanpi: Warlord Cao Cao defeats and kills Yuan Tan, the eldest son of his rival Yuan Shao.

=== 206 ===
==== By place ====
====== Roman Empire ======
- Hadrian's Wall is retaken for the first time, since the Pictish uprising of 180.
- Emperor Septimius Severus goes to Britain, with his sons Caracalla and Geta.

=== 207 ===
==== By place ====
====== China ======
- Battle of White Wolf Mountain: Warlord Cao Cao defeats the Wuhuan tribes, sending the Wuhuan into decline.

=== 208 ===
==== By place ====
====== China ======
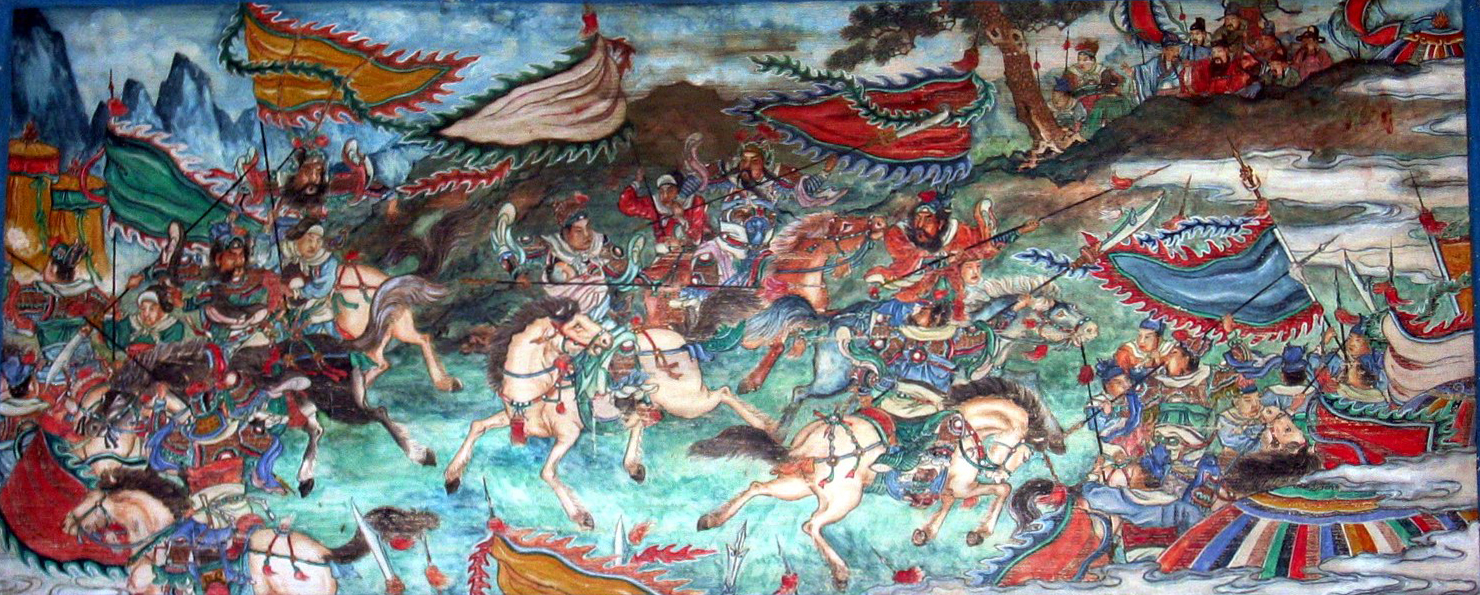
Zhao Yun fights at Changban (or Jing Province)

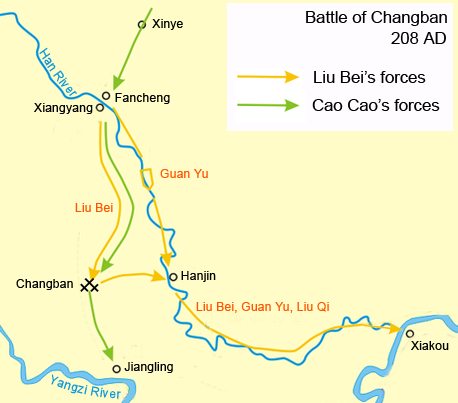
Map of the Battle of Changban

- Spring – Battle of Jiangxia: Sun Quan defeats Huang Zu.
- October
  - Warlord Cao Cao marches south with his army, and captures the enemy fleet at Jiangling.
  - Battle of Changban: Warlord Liu Bei escapes from Cao Cao.
- December 10 – Cao Cao writes Duǎn Ge Xíng.
- Winter – Zhou Yu and Liu Bei defeat Cao Cao at the Battle of Red Cliffs; along with the Battle of Yamen and Battle of Lake Poyang. This is one of the largest naval battles in China's history.

====== Parthia ======
- King Vologases VI succeeds his father Vologases V to the throne. His brother Artabanus V begins a rebellion against him in the Parthian Empire.
- Ardashir I, ruler of Istakhr (Persia), revolts against his brother and founds the Sassanid Dynasty.

=== 209 ===
==== By place ====
====== Roman Empire ======
- Publius Septimius Geta receives the titles of Imperator and Augustus from his father, Emperor Septimius Severus.
- Septimius Severus makes plans to subdue the land to the north of Scotland, ravaging it severely. Road-building and forest-clearing, the Roman army reaches Aber; Scottish tribes begin guerrilla warfare.

====== India ======
- Chandra Shri Satakarni begins his reign, as ruler of the Satavahana Dynasty in Andhra Pradesh (approximate date).

== Births ==
200

- Cyprian, Roman bishop and writer (d. 258)
- Diophantus, Greek mathematician and writer
- Marcus Claudius Tacitus, Roman emperor (d. 276)
- Novatian, Roman antipope and theologian (d. 258)
- Valerian I, Roman emperor (d. 260/264)
- Zhang Changpu, Chinese concubine (d. 257)

201

- Decius, Roman emperor (d. 251)

202

- Jiang Wei, Chinese general and regent (d. 264)

203

- Zhuge Ke, Chinese general and politician (d. 253)

204

- Cao Rui, Chinese emperor of Cao Wei (d. 239)
- Dong Jue, Chinese official and general
- Elagabalus, Roman emperor (d. 222)
- Philip the Arab, Roman emperor (d. 249)
- Wei Zhao, Chinese historian (d. 273)
- Zhuge Qiao, Chinese official and general (d. 228)

205

- Cao Rui, Chinese emperor of Cao Wei (d. 239)
- Gu Tan, Chinese official and politician (d. 246)
- Plotinus, Greek philosopher and writer (d. 270)
- Shan Tao, Chinese Taoist scholar and official (d. 283)
- Sima Wang, Chinese prince and general (d. 271)
- Zhang Xiu (or Shusi), Chinese general (d. 245)

206

- Trebonianus Gallus, Roman emperor (d. 253)
- Wang Jun (or Shizhi), Chinese general (d. 286)

207

- Liu Shan (or Gongsi), Chinese emperor (d. 271)

208

- Cao Li, Chinese imperial prince (d. 229)
- Diadumenian, Roman emperor (d. 218)
- Sima Shi, Chinese general and regent (d. 255)
- Severus Alexander, Roman emperor (d. 235)

209

- Dongcheon, Korean ruler of Goguryeo (d. 248)
- Fu Jia, Chinese official and politician (d. 255)
- Guan Lu, Chinese diviner and politician (d. 256)
- Sun Deng (or Zigao), Chinese crown prince (d. 241)
- Xiahou Xuan, Chinese general and politician (d. 254)

== Deaths ==
200

- Gan Ji, Chinese Taoist priest and writer
- Ju Shou, Chinese adviser and politician
- Quintus Aemilius Saturninus, Roman prefect
- Sun Ce, Chinese general and warlord (b. 175)
- Tian Feng, Chinese official, adviser and politician
- Xu Gong, Chinese official, administrator and warlord
- Zheng Xuan, Chinese philosopher and writer (b. 127)
- Emperor Chūai of Japan, according to legend.
- Chunyu Qiong
- Yan Liang
- Wen Chou

201

- Galen, Greek physician (see 210) (b. 129)
- Zhao Qi, Chinese official and scholar

202

- June 28 – Yuan Shao, Chinese warlord (b. 154)
- Irenaeus, Greek bishop and theologian (b. 130)
- Lady Wu, wife of Sun Jian and mother of Sun Ce
- Pang Ji (or Yangtu), Chinese official and adviser

203

- Ŭl P'a-so, Korean official and Prime-Minister
- Ling Cao, Chinese general under Sun Ce
- Perpetua and Felicity, Christian martyrs
- Sun Yi, Chinese general and politician (b. 184)
- Wu Jing, Chinese general under Sun Ce

204

- Gongsun Du, Chinese general and warlord (b. 150)
- Ren Jun, Chinese general under Cao Cao
- Shen Pei, Chinese official and minister
- Xin Ping, Chinese official and minister
- Xu You, Chinese adviser and strategist

205

- January 22 – Gaius Fulvius Plautianus, Roman consul
- Guo Tu (or Gongze), Chinese official and politician
- Marcus Peducaeus Plautius Quintillus, Roman consul
- Popilius Pedo Apronianus, Roman politician
- Yuan Tan, Chinese general and warlord

206

- Gao Gan, Chinese warlord, politician
- Taishi Ci (or Ziyi), Chinese general (b. 166)
- Ying Shao, Chinese politician, writer (b. 140)

207

- Guo Jia, Chinese adviser and official (b. 170)
- Tadun, Chinese chieftain of the Wuhuan tribe
- Yuan Shang, Chinese warlord and governor
- Yuan Xi (or Xianyong), Chinese warlord
- Zhang Xiu, Chinese general and warlord

208

- Cao Chong (or Cangshu), Chinese warlord (b. 196)
- Huang Zu, Chinese general and administrator
- Hua Tuo, Chinese physician and surgeon (b. 140)
- Kong Rong, Chinese warlord and politician (b. 153)
- Liu Biao, Chinese governor and warlord (b. 142)
- Liu Fu, Chinese governor and politician
- Vologases V, king of the Parthian Empire

209

- Chen Deng, Chinese general and politician (b. 170)
- Jin Xuan (or Yuanji), Chinese official and warlord
- Li Tong, Chinese general and politician (b. 168)
- Liu Qi, Chinese general, governor and politician
- Xun Yue, Chinese scholar and official (b. 148)
