= 184th =

184th may refer to:

- 184th (2nd South Midland) Brigade, formation of the Territorial Force of the British Army
- 184th AAA Battalion (United States), attached to the 49th AAA Brigade
- 184th Battalion, CEF, unit in the Canadian Expeditionary Force during the First World War
- 184th Fighter Squadron, unit of the Arkansas Air National Guard that flew the A-10 Thunderbolt II
- 184th Infantry Regiment (United States) (Second California), infantry regiment of the United States Army
- 184th Intelligence Wing, located at McConnell AFB, Kansas
- 184th Nembo Parachute Division, airborne division of the Italian Army during World War II
- 184th Ohio Infantry (or 184th OVI), infantry regiment in the Union Army during the American Civil War
- 184th Ordnance Battalion (EOD) accomplish the explosive ordnance disposal (EOD) support activity
- 184th Reconnaissance Aviation Regiment, Yugoslav aviation regiment established in 1948
- 184th Rifle Division (Soviet Union), Soviet Red Army division during World War II
- Pennsylvania's 184th Representative District

== See also ==
- 184 (number)
- AD 184, the year 184 (CLXXXIV) of the Julian calendar
- 184 BC
