= AD 169 =

169 in various calendars
- Gregorian calendar: 169; CLXIX
- Ab urbe condita: 922
- Assyrian calendar: 4919
- Balinese saka calendar: 90–91
- Bengali calendar: −425 – −424
- Berber calendar: 1119
- Buddhist calendar: 713
- Burmese calendar: −469
- Byzantine calendar: 5677–5678
- Chinese calendar: 戊申年 (Earth Monkey); 2866 or 2659 — to — 己酉年 (Earth Rooster); 2867 or 2660
- Coptic calendar: −115 – −114
- Discordian calendar: 1335
- Ethiopian calendar: 161–162
- Hebrew calendar: 3929–3930
- Hindu calendars
- Vikram Samvat: 225–226
- Shaka Samvat: 90–91
- Kali Yuga: 3269–3270
- Holocene calendar: 10169
- Iranian calendar: 453 BP – 452 BP
- Islamic calendar: 467 BH – 466 BH
- Javanese calendar: 45–46
- Julian calendar: 169; CLXIX
- Korean calendar: 2502
- Minguo calendar: 1743 before ROC 民前1743年
- Nanakshahi calendar: −1299
- Seleucid era: 480/481 AG
- Thai solar calendar: 711–712
- Tibetan calendar: ས་ཕོ་སྤྲེ་ལོ་ (male Earth-Monkey); 295 or −86 or −858 — to — ས་མོ་བྱ་ལོ་ (female Earth-Bird); 296 or −85 or −857

Year 169 (CLXIX) was a common year starting on Saturday of the Julian calendar. At the time, it was known as the Year of the Consulship of Senecio and Apollinaris (or, less frequently, year 922 Ab urbe condita). The denomination 169 for this year has been used since the early medieval period, when the Anno Domini calendar era became the prevalent method in Europe for naming years.

== Events ==
=== By place ===
==== Roman Empire ====
- Marcomannic Wars: Germanic tribes invade the frontiers of the Roman Empire, specifically the provinces of Raetia and Moesia.
- Northern African Moors invade what is now Spain.
- Marcus Aurelius becomes sole Roman Emperor upon the death of Lucius Verus.
- Marcus Aurelius forces his daughter Lucilla into marriage with Claudius Pompeianus.
- Galen moves back to Rome for good.

==== China ====
- Confucian scholars who had denounced the court eunuchs are arrested, killed or banished from the capital of Luoyang and official life during the second episode of the Disasters of Partisan Prohibitions, which does not formally end until 184 with the onslaught of the Yellow Turban Rebellion.

=== By topic ===
==== Religion ====
- Pertinax succeeds Alypius as bishop of Byzantium.
- Theophilus of Antioch becomes patriarch of Antioch.

==== Arts and sciences ====
- Lucian demonstrates the absurdity of fatalism.

== Births ==
- Jingū, Japanese empress and regent (d. 269)
- Zhang Liao, Chinese general (d. 222)

== Deaths ==
- January 23 – Lucius Verus, Roman emperor (b. 130)
- September 10 – Marcus Annius Verus, Roman co-ruler
- Alypius, bishop of Byzantium (approximate date)
- Li Ying, Chinese scholar and politician
