= AD 170 =

170 in various calendars
- Gregorian calendar: 170; CLXX
- Ab urbe condita: 923
- Assyrian calendar: 4920
- Balinese saka calendar: 91–92
- Bengali calendar: −424 – −423
- Berber calendar: 1120
- Buddhist calendar: 714
- Burmese calendar: −468
- Byzantine calendar: 5678–5679
- Chinese calendar: 己酉年 (Earth Rooster); 2867 or 2660 — to — 庚戌年 (Metal Dog); 2868 or 2661
- Coptic calendar: −114 – −113
- Discordian calendar: 1336
- Ethiopian calendar: 162–163
- Hebrew calendar: 3930–3931
- Hindu calendars
- Vikram Samvat: 226–227
- Shaka Samvat: 91–92
- Kali Yuga: 3270–3271
- Holocene calendar: 10170
- Iranian calendar: 452 BP – 451 BP
- Islamic calendar: 466 BH – 465 BH
- Javanese calendar: 46–47
- Julian calendar: 170; CLXX
- Korean calendar: 2503
- Minguo calendar: 1742 before ROC 民前1742年
- Nanakshahi calendar: −1298
- Seleucid era: 481/482 AG
- Thai solar calendar: 712–713
- Tibetan calendar: ས་མོ་བྱ་ལོ་ (female Earth-Bird); 296 or −85 or −857 — to — ལྕགས་ཕོ་ཁྱི་ལོ་ (male Iron-Dog); 297 or −84 or −856

Year 170 (CLXX) was a common year starting on Sunday of the Julian calendar. At the time, it was known as the Year of the Consulship of Clarus and Cornelius (or, less frequently, year 923 Ab urbe condita). The denomination 170 for this year has been used since the early medieval period, when the Anno Domini calendar era became the prevalent method in Europe for naming years.

== Events ==
=== By place ===
==== Roman Empire ====
- The Suebian tribes of the Marcomanni cross the Danube and invade Northern Italy. The Roman army (20,000 men) is destroyed near Carnuntum in Pannonia.
- The Marcomanni plunder Opitergium (modern Oderzo) and besiege Aquileia. This is the first time hostile forces have entered Italy since 101 BC.
- Emperor Marcus Aurelius writes in Sirmium (Pannonia) his first of 12 books of the Meditations in Koine Greek.
- The Costoboci cross the Danube (Dacia) and ravage Thrace in the Balkan Peninsula. They reach Eleusina, near Athens, and destroy the temple of the Eleusinian Mysteries.
- Marcus Aurelius orders humane treatment for Christians and slaves throughout the Roman Empire.
- An Equestrian Statue of Marcus Aurelius is erected in Rome.
- The Porta Nigra is built in Augusta Treverorum (modern Trier). (approximate date)

== Births ==
- Guo Jia, Chinese politician and adviser (d. 207)
- Herodian, Roman historian and writer (d. 240)
- Julia Domna, Roman empress consort (d. 217)
- Pang De, Chinese military general (d. 219)
- Philostratus, Greek sophist (approximate date)
- Vibia Aurelia Sabina, Marcus Aurelius' last surviving child (d. 217)

== Deaths ==
- Alexander of Abonoteichus, Greek mystic (b. AD 105)
- An Shigao, Chinese Buddhist missionary (b. AD 148)
- Apuleius, Numidian philosopher and writer (b. AD 124)
- Demonax, Greek philosopher and writer (b. c. AD 70)
- Junius Rusticus, Roman teacher and politician (b. AD 100)
- Marcus Cornelius Fronto, Roman grammarian (b. AD 100)
- Ptolemy, Greek mathematician and astronomer (b. AD 100)
