= AD 148 =

148 in various calendars
- Gregorian calendar: 148; CXLVIII
- Ab urbe condita: 901
- Assyrian calendar: 4898
- Balinese saka calendar: 69–70
- Bengali calendar: −446 – −445
- Berber calendar: 1098
- Buddhist calendar: 692
- Burmese calendar: −490
- Byzantine calendar: 5656–5657
- Chinese calendar: 丁亥年 (Fire Pig); 2845 or 2638 — to — 戊子年 (Earth Rat); 2846 or 2639
- Coptic calendar: −136 – −135
- Discordian calendar: 1314
- Ethiopian calendar: 140–141
- Hebrew calendar: 3908–3909
- Hindu calendars
- Vikram Samvat: 204–205
- Shaka Samvat: 69–70
- Kali Yuga: 3248–3249
- Holocene calendar: 10148
- Iranian calendar: 474 BP – 473 BP
- Islamic calendar: 489 BH – 488 BH
- Javanese calendar: 23–24
- Julian calendar: 148; CXLVIII
- Korean calendar: 2481
- Minguo calendar: 1764 before ROC 民前1764年
- Nanakshahi calendar: −1320
- Seleucid era: 459/460 AG
- Thai solar calendar: 690–691
- Tibetan calendar: མེ་མོ་ཕག་ལོ་ (female Fire-Boar); 274 or −107 or −879 — to — ས་ཕོ་བྱི་བ་ལོ་ (male Earth-Rat); 275 or −106 or −878

Year 148 (CXLVIII) was a leap year starting on Sunday of the Julian calendar. At the time, it was known as the Year of the Consulship of Cornelius and Calpernius (or, less frequently, year 901 Ab urbe condita). The denomination 148 for this year has been used since the early medieval period, when the Anno Domini calendar era became the prevalent method in Europe for naming years.

== Events ==
=== By place ===
==== Roman Empire ====
- Emperor Antoninus Pius hosts a series of grand games, to celebrate Rome's 900th anniversary.

==== Asia ====
- An Shigao arrives in China.

=== By topic ===
==== Religion ====
- Euzois succeeds Athendodorus, as Patriarch of Constantinople.

== Births ==
- Xun Yue (or Zhongyu), Chinese official and historian (d. 209)

== Deaths ==
- Athendodorus, Patriarch of Constantinople.
