= 240 =

240 in various calendars
- Gregorian calendar: 240; CCXL
- Ab urbe condita: 993
- Assyrian calendar: 4990
- Balinese saka calendar: 161–162
- Bengali calendar: −354 – −353
- Berber calendar: 1190
- Buddhist calendar: 784
- Burmese calendar: −398
- Byzantine calendar: 5748–5749
- Chinese calendar: 己未年 (Earth Goat); 2937 or 2730 — to — 庚申年 (Metal Monkey); 2938 or 2731
- Coptic calendar: −44 – −43
- Discordian calendar: 1406
- Ethiopian calendar: 232–233
- Hebrew calendar: 4000–4001
- Hindu calendars
- Vikram Samvat: 296–297
- Shaka Samvat: 161–162
- Kali Yuga: 3340–3341
- Holocene calendar: 10240
- Iranian calendar: 382 BP – 381 BP
- Islamic calendar: 394 BH – 393 BH
- Javanese calendar: 118–119
- Julian calendar: 240; CCXL
- Korean calendar: 2573
- Minguo calendar: 1672 before ROC 民前1672年
- Nanakshahi calendar: −1228
- Seleucid era: 551/552 AG
- Thai solar calendar: 782–783
- Tibetan calendar: ས་མོ་ལུག་ལོ་ (female Earth-Sheep); 366 or −15 or −787 — to — ལྕགས་ཕོ་སྤྲེ་ལོ་ (male Iron-Monkey); 367 or −14 or −786

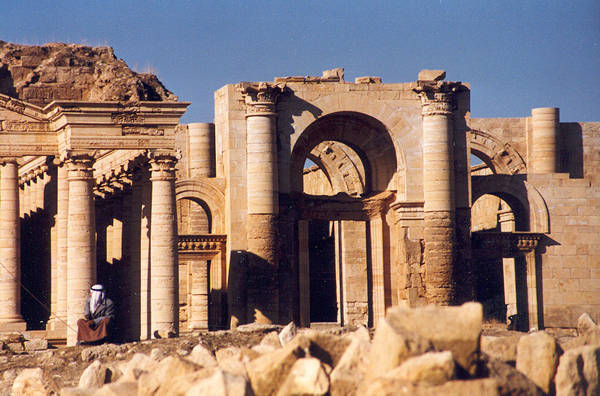
The ruins of Hatra (1988)

Year 240 (CCXL) was a leap year starting on Wednesday of the Julian calendar. At the time, it was known as the Year of the Consulship of Sabinus and Venustus (or, less frequently, year 993 Ab urbe condita). The denomination 240 for this year has been used since the early medieval period, when the Anno Domini calendar era became the prevalent method in Europe for naming years.

== Events ==
=== By place ===
==== Roman Empire ====
- The Roman Empire is threatened on several fronts at the same time. Africa revolts and tribes in northwest Germania, under the name of the Franks, are raiding the Rhine frontier.

==== Persia ====
- April 12 – Prince Shapur I becomes co-ruler of the Sasanian Empire with his father King Ardashir I.
- Siege of Hatra: The Sasanians besiege the capital of the Kingdom of Hatra ruled by Sanatruq II.

==== India ====
- Maharaja Sri-Gupta becomes ruler of the Gupta Empire (approximate date).

=== By topic ===
==== Religion ====
- Mani, a young mystic of Ctesiphon, proclaims himself a prophet at the court of Ardashir I. He preaches his doctrine, Manichaeism, throughout the Sassanid Empire.

== Births ==
- Lucian of Antioch, Syrian theologian and martyr (d. 312)
- Sporus of Nicaea, Greek mathematician (approximate date)
- Zenobia, queen of the Palmyrene Empire (d. 274)

== Deaths ==
- Ammonius Saccas, Neoplatonic philosopher (approximate date)
- Herodian of Antioch, Roman historian and writer (b. 170)
- Huang Quan (or Gongheng), Chinese general
