= 166 =

166 may also refer to:

- 166 (number), the natural number following 165 and preceding 167
- AD 166
- 166 BC
- 166 (New Jersey bus)
- ONE 166, a combat sport event produced by ONE Championship
- EN 166, a European standard concerning eye protection
- UFC 166, a mixed martial arts event held by the Ultimate Fighting Championship
- Ferrari 166, various Ferrari sports cars
- Alfa Romeo 166, an executive sedan
- Radical 166, one of the 20 Kangxi radicals (214 radicals in total) composed of 7 strokes meaning "village" or "li"
- 166 Rhodope, a dark background asteroid from the central region of the asteroid belt
