= AD 166 =

166 in various calendars
- Gregorian calendar: 166; CLXVI
- Ab urbe condita: 919
- Assyrian calendar: 4916
- Balinese saka calendar: 87–88
- Bengali calendar: −428 – −427
- Berber calendar: 1116
- Buddhist calendar: 710
- Burmese calendar: −472
- Byzantine calendar: 5674–5675
- Chinese calendar: 乙巳年 (Wood Snake); 2863 or 2656 — to — 丙午年 (Fire Horse); 2864 or 2657
- Coptic calendar: −118 – −117
- Discordian calendar: 1332
- Ethiopian calendar: 158–159
- Hebrew calendar: 3926–3927
- Hindu calendars
- Vikram Samvat: 222–223
- Shaka Samvat: 87–88
- Kali Yuga: 3266–3267
- Holocene calendar: 10166
- Iranian calendar: 456 BP – 455 BP
- Islamic calendar: 470 BH – 469 BH
- Javanese calendar: 42–43
- Julian calendar: 166; CLXVI
- Korean calendar: 2499
- Minguo calendar: 1746 before ROC 民前1746年
- Nanakshahi calendar: −1302
- Seleucid era: 477/478 AG
- Thai solar calendar: 708–709
- Tibetan calendar: ཤིང་མོ་སྦྲུལ་ལོ་ (female Wood-Snake); 292 or −89 or −861 — to — མེ་ཕོ་རྟ་ལོ་ (male Fire-Horse); 293 or −88 or −860

Year 166 (CLXVI) was a common year starting on Tuesday of the Julian calendar. At the time, it was known as the Year of the Consulship of Pudens and Pollio (or, less frequently, year 919 Ab urbe condita). The denomination 166 for this year has been used since the early medieval period, when the Anno Domini calendar era became the prevalent method in Europe for naming years.

== Events ==
=== By place ===
==== Roman Empire ====
- Dacia is invaded by barbarians.
- Conflict erupts on the Danube frontier between Rome and the Germanic tribe of the Marcomanni.
- Emperor Marcus Aurelius appoints his sons Commodus and Marcus Annius Verus as co-rulers (Caesar), while he and Lucius Verus travel to Germany.
- End of the war with Parthia: The Parthians leave Armenia and eastern Mesopotamia, which both become Roman protectorates.
- A plague (possibly small pox) comes from the East and spreads throughout the Roman Empire, lasting for roughly twenty years.
- The Lombards invade Pannonia (modern Hungary). They are quickly dispatched by the Roman Army.

==== Asia ====
- King Chogo of Baekje succeeds to the throne of Baekje, in the Korean Peninsula.
- Scholars who have denounced eunuchs are arrested, killed or banished from the capital and official life in Han dynasty China. This is the first of the Disasters of the Partisan Prohibitions, which end in 184.
- A Roman envoy arrives by sea in Rinan commandery, in southern China (central Vietnam). He travels to the Chinese capital Luoyang, and is greeted by Emperor Huan of the Han dynasty.

=== By topic ===
==== Religion ====
- Pope Soter succeeds Pope Anicetus as the twelfth pope of Rome.
- Alypius succeeds Laurence as Patriarch of Constantinople.

== Births ==
- Taishi Ci (or Ziyi), Chinese general (d. 206)

== Deaths ==
- Celadion, patriarch of Alexandria
- Gaeru of Baekje, Korean ruler
- Laurence, bishop of Byzantium
- Ma Rong, Chinese poet and politician (b. AD 79)
