= 184 =

184 may also refer to:

- 184 (number)
- 184 BC
- AD 184
- Interstate 184
- UFC 184
- 184 Dejopeja
- Flettner Fl 184
- Rule 184
- Group of 184
- Short Type 184

== See also ==
- 184th (disambiguation)
