= 209 =

209 in various calendars
- Gregorian calendar: 209; CCIX
- Ab urbe condita: 962
- Assyrian calendar: 4959
- Balinese saka calendar: 130–131
- Bengali calendar: −385 – −384
- Berber calendar: 1159
- Buddhist calendar: 753
- Burmese calendar: −429
- Byzantine calendar: 5717–5718
- Chinese calendar: 戊子年 (Earth Rat); 2906 or 2699 — to — 己丑年 (Earth Ox); 2907 or 2700
- Coptic calendar: −75 – −74
- Discordian calendar: 1375
- Ethiopian calendar: 201–202
- Hebrew calendar: 3969–3970
- Hindu calendars
- Vikram Samvat: 265–266
- Shaka Samvat: 130–131
- Kali Yuga: 3309–3310
- Holocene calendar: 10209
- Iranian calendar: 413 BP – 412 BP
- Islamic calendar: 426 BH – 425 BH
- Javanese calendar: 86–87
- Julian calendar: 209; CCIX
- Korean calendar: 2542
- Minguo calendar: 1703 before ROC 民前1703年
- Nanakshahi calendar: −1259
- Seleucid era: 520/521 AG
- Thai solar calendar: 751–752
- Tibetan calendar: ས་ཕོ་བྱི་བ་ལོ་ (male Earth-Rat); 335 or −46 or −818 — to — ས་མོ་གླང་ལོ་ (female Earth-Ox); 336 or −45 or −817

Year 209 (CCIX) was a common year starting on Sunday of the Julian calendar. At the time, it was known as the Year of the Consulship of Commodus and Lollianus (or, less frequently, year 962 Ab urbe condita). The denomination 209 for this year has been used since the early medieval period, when the Anno Domini calendar era became the prevalent method in Europe for naming years.

== Events ==
=== By place ===
==== Roman Empire ====
- Publius Septimius Geta receives the titles of Imperator and Augustus from his father, Emperor Septimius Severus.
- Septimius Severus makes plans to subdue the land to the north of Scotland, ravaging it severely. Road-building and forest-clearing, the Roman army reaches Aber; Scottish tribes begin guerrilla warfare.

==== India ====
- Chandra Shri Satakarni begins his reign, as ruler of the Satavahana Dynasty in Andhra Pradesh (approximate date).

== Births ==
- Dongcheon, Korean ruler of Goguryeo (d. 248)
- Fu Jia, Chinese official and politician (d. 255)
- Guan Lu, Chinese diviner and politician (d. 256)
- Sun Deng (or Zigao), Chinese crown prince (d. 241)
- Xiahou Xuan, Chinese general and politician (d. 254)

== Deaths ==
- Chen Deng, Chinese general and politician (b. 170)
- Jin Xuan (or Yuanji), Chinese official and warlord
- Li Tong, Chinese general and politician (b. 168)
- Liu Qi, Chinese general, governor and politician
- Xun Yue, Chinese scholar and official (b. 148)
