= 184th Ordnance Battalion (EOD) =

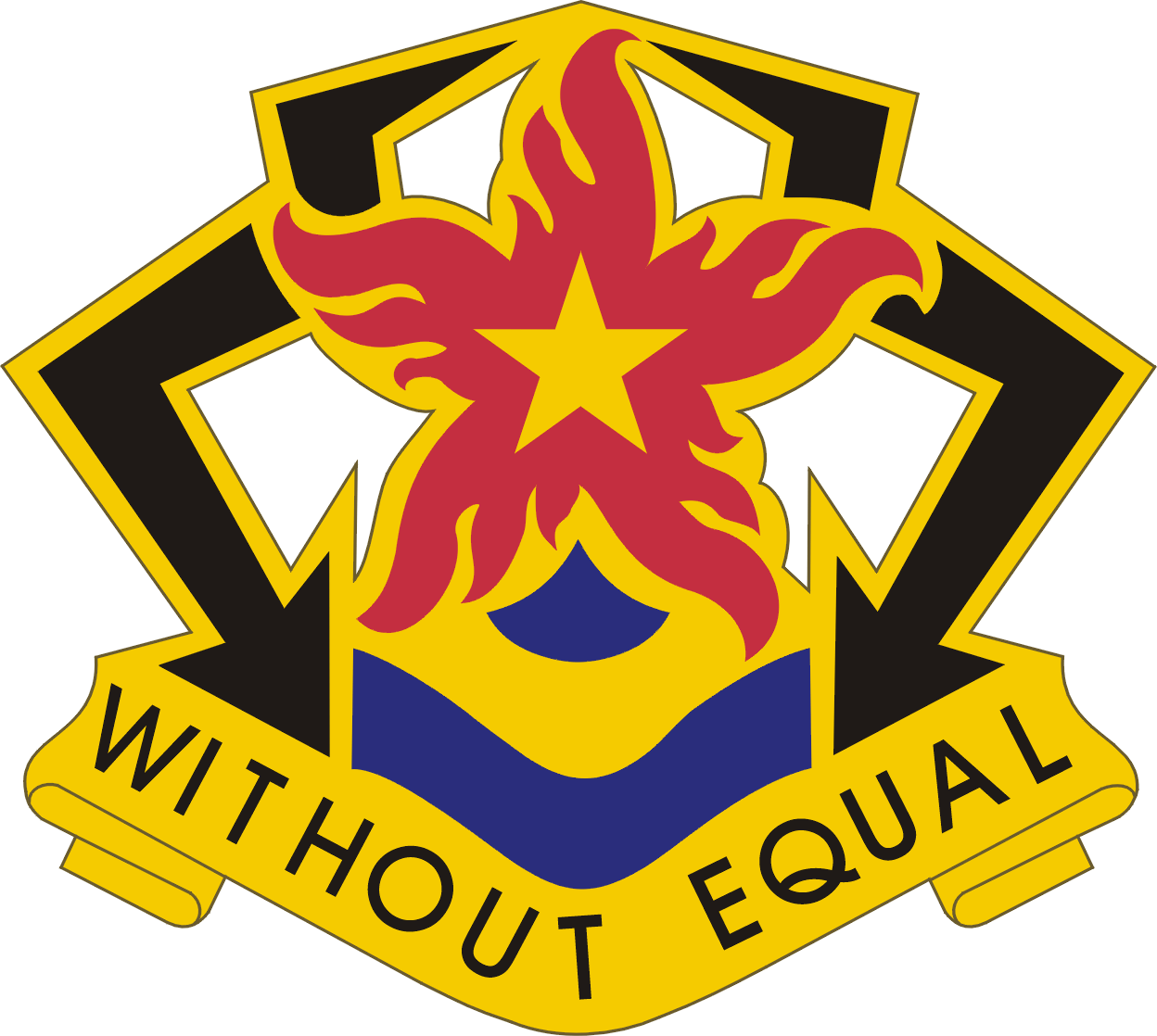
- Distinctive unit insignia
- Active: 1998–present
- Country: United States
- Branch: United States Army
- Type: Ordnance
- Role: Explosive Ordnance Disposal
- Part of: 52nd Ordnance Group (EOD)
- HQ: Fort Campbell, KY

Commanders
- Commander: LTC Jeremy Pinson
- Command Sergeant Major: CSM Thomas Hennig

The 184th Ordnance Battalion (EOD) is a United States Army Forces Command battalion in the United States Army that provides explosive ordnance disposal (EOD) support to US forces, allies, foreign partners, and Tribal, Federal, State, and local law enforcement with its assigned mission area.

== Organization ==
Higher Headquarters: 52nd Ordnance Group (EOD)

184th Ordnance Battalion (EOD) (Fort Campbell, KY)

- Headquarters and Headquarters Detachment (HHD)
- 38th Ordnance Company (EOD) (Fort Stewart, GA)
- 49th Ordnance Company (EOD) (Fort Campbell, KY)
- 717th Ordnance Company (EOD) (Fort Campbell, KY)
- 723th Ordnance Company (EOD) (Fort Campbell, KY)
- 744th Ordnance Company (EOD) (Fort Campbell, KY)
- 756th Ordnance Company (EOD) (Fort Stewart, GA)
- 789th Ordnance Company (EOD) (Fort Benning, GA)

== Lineage ==
1. Constituted 18 October 1927 in the Regular Army as the 6th Motor Repair Battalion
2. Redesignated 1 May 1936 as the 53d Quartermaster Regiment (less 1st Battalion)
3. Activated on 10 February 1941 as Headquarters and Headquarters Detachment, 3d Battalion, 53d Quartermaster Regiment at Fort Bragg, North Carolina
4. Converted and redesignated 18 August 1942 as Headquarters and Headquarters Detachment, 3d Battalion, 53d Ordnance Heavy Maintenance Regiment
5. Reorganized and redesignated 7 October 1942 as Headquarters and Headquarters Detachment, 184th Ordnance Heavy Maintenance Battalion
6. Redesignated 31 May 1943 as Headquarters and Headquarters Detachment, 184th Ordnance Battalion
7. Inactivated 11 March 1946 in Germany
8. Activated 1 June 1954 at Fort Sill, Oklahoma
9. Reorganized and redesignated 12 August 1965 as Headquarters and Headquarters Company, 184th Ordnance Battalion
10. Inactivated 2 April 1972 at Fort Lewis, Washington
11. Activated 16 June 1998 at Fort Gillem, Georgia as Headquarters and Headquarters Detachment, 184th Ordnance Battalion (EOD)
12. Moved to Fort Campbell, Kentucky in late 2008 to early 2009 as Headquarters and Headquarters Detachment, 184th Ordnance Battalion (EOD)

== Honors ==
=== Campaign participation credit ===
- World War II

Normandy
Northern France
Rhineland
Ardennes-Alsace
Central Europe

- Vietnam

Counteroffensive
Counteroffensive, Phase II
Counteroffensive, Phase III
Tet Counteroffensive
Counteroffensive, Phase IV
Counteroffensive, Phase V
Counteroffensive, Phase VI
Tet 69/Counteroffensive
Summer-Fall 1969
Winter-Spring 1970
Sanctuary Counteroffensive
Counteroffensive, Phase VII
Consolidation I
Consolidation II
Cease-Fire

=== Decorations ===
1. Meritorious Unit Commendation (Army) for VIETNAM 1967–1968
2. Meritorious Unit Commendation (Army) for VIETNAM 1968–1969
