= 256 =

256 in various calendars
- Gregorian calendar: 256; CCLVI
- Ab urbe condita: 1009
- Assyrian calendar: 5006
- Balinese saka calendar: 177–178
- Bengali calendar: −338 – −337
- Berber calendar: 1206
- Buddhist calendar: 800
- Burmese calendar: −382
- Byzantine calendar: 5764–5765
- Chinese calendar: 乙亥年 (Wood Pig); 2953 or 2746 — to — 丙子年 (Fire Rat); 2954 or 2747
- Coptic calendar: −28 – −27
- Discordian calendar: 1422
- Ethiopian calendar: 248–249
- Hebrew calendar: 4016–4017
- Hindu calendars
- Vikram Samvat: 312–313
- Shaka Samvat: 177–178
- Kali Yuga: 3356–3357
- Holocene calendar: 10256
- Iranian calendar: 366 BP – 365 BP
- Islamic calendar: 377 BH – 376 BH
- Javanese calendar: 135–136
- Julian calendar: 256; CCLVI
- Korean calendar: 2589
- Minguo calendar: 1656 before ROC 民前1656年
- Nanakshahi calendar: −1212
- Seleucid era: 567/568 AG
- Thai solar calendar: 798–799
- Tibetan calendar: ཤིང་མོ་ཕག་ལོ་ (female Wood-Boar); 382 or 1 or −771 — to — མེ་ཕོ་བྱི་བ་ལོ་ (male Fire-Rat); 383 or 2 or −770

Year 256 (CCLVI) was a leap year starting on Tuesday of the Julian calendar. At the time, it was known as the Year of the Consulship of Claudius and Glabrio (or, less frequently, year 1009 Ab urbe condita). The denomination 256 for this year has been used since the early medieval period, when the Anno Domini calendar era became the prevalent method in Europe for naming years.

== Events ==
=== By place ===
==== Roman Empire ====
- February 28 – Papyrus Oxyrhynchus 3035, a warrant for the arrest of a Christian, is written.
- The Goths invade Asia Minor. Dacia is lost for the Roman Empire, and the Goths appear at the walls of Thessalonica.
- The Franks cross the Rhine; the Alemanni reach Mediolanum (Milan) (disputed date).
- In Africa, the Berbers massacre Roman colonists.
- King Shapur I of the Sasanian Empire invades Mesopotamia and Syria. He conquers and plunders Antioch, destroys Dura-Europos, and sacks the Anatolian city of Zeugma on the Euphrates. A devastating fire and an earthquake soon follow, causing Zeugma to be abandoned.
- Cities in the Roman Empire begin to build walls, as the defense of the frontiers begins to crumble; future emperor Aurelian inspects along the Rhine.

==== Asia ====
- Peace and unity are finally restored in China, with the victories of the Wei Kingdom in the north. The ruling dynasty is worn out by war, and the kingdom is ruled by ministers on their behalf.

=== By topic ===
==== Medicine ====
- The great pandemic of the Roman world strikes violently in Pontus on the Black Sea, and causes enormous loss of life in Alexandria, encouraging thousands to embrace Christianity.

==== Religion ====
- Emperor Valerian persecutes Christians.
- Pope Stephen I threatens to excommunicate Cyprian, bishop of Carthage, and other bishops in Africa and Asia Minor, unless they stop rebaptizing heretics. Cyprian attacks the Pope in a treatise that gains support from the Council of Carthage. He sends envoys to Rome, raising the specter of a schism between the Roman and Carthaginian Churches.
- A Synod of Carthage is held.

== Births ==
- Arius, Egyptian priest and founder of Arianism (d. 336)
- Wang Yan (or Yifu), Chinese official and politician (d. 311)

== Deaths ==
- March 11 – Cao Lin, Chinese prince and son of Cao Cao
- October 19 – Sun Jun (or Ziyuan), Chinese general and regent (b. 219)
- October 21 – Lü Dai (or Dinggong), Chinese general (b. 161)
- November 12 – Lü Ju (or Shiyi), Chinese general and politician
- Guan Lu (or Gongming), Chinese diviner and politician (b. 209)
- Wang Su (or Ziyong), Chinese scholar and official (b. 195)
