= AD 311 =

311 in various calendars
Gregorian calendar	311; CCCXI
Ab urbe condita	1064
Assyrian calendar	5061
Balinese saka calendar	232–233
Bengali calendar	−283 – −282
Berber calendar	1261
Buddhist calendar	855
Burmese calendar	−327
Byzantine calendar	5819–5820
Chinese calendar	庚午年 (Metal Horse); 3008 or 2801 — to — 辛未年 (Metal Goat); 3009 or 2802
Coptic calendar	27–28
Discordian calendar	1477
Ethiopian calendar	303–304
Hebrew calendar	4071–4072
- Hindu calendars
Vikram Samvat	367–368
Shaka Samvat	232–233
Kali Yuga	3411–3412
Holocene calendar	10311
Iranian calendar	311 BP – 310 BP
Islamic calendar	321 BH – 320 BH
Javanese calendar	191–192
Julian calendar	311; CCCXI
Korean calendar	2644
Minguo calendar	1601 before ROC 民前1601年
Nanakshahi calendar	−1157
Seleucid era	622/623 AG
Thai solar calendar	853–854
Tibetan calendar	ལྕགས་ཕོ་རྟ་ལོ་ (male Iron-Horse); 437 or 56 or −716 — to — ལྕགས་མོ་ལུག་ལོ་ (female Iron-Sheep); 438 or 57 or −715

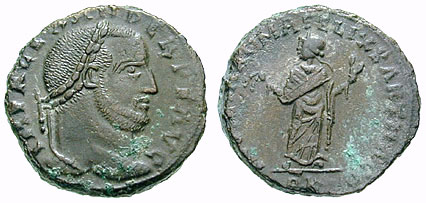
Domitius Alexander (r. 308–311)

Year 311 (CCCXI) was a common year starting on Monday of the Julian calendar. At the time, it was known as the Year of the Consulship of Valerius and Maximinus (or, less frequently, year 1064 Ab urbe condita). The denomination 311 for this year has been used since the early medieval period, when the Anno Domini calendar era became the prevalent method in Europe for naming years.

== Events ==
=== By place ===
==== Roman Empire ====
- April 30 – On his deathbed, Emperor Galerius declares religious freedom and issues the Edict of Serdica, ending the Diocletianic Persecution of Christians in the eastern half of the Roman Empire.
- May 5 – Galerius dies at age 51 from a gruesome disease, possibly colorectal cancer or Fournier gangrene.
- Maximinus Daza and Licinius divide the Eastern Empire between themselves.
- Maximinus recommences the persecution of Christians, having encouraged his subjects to petition him to do so.
- Fearing an alliance between Licinius and Constantine I, Maximinus forges a secret alliance with Emperor Maxentius.

==== China ====
- July 13 – Disaster of Yongjia: Xiongnu soldiers led by Liu Cong conquer and pillage the Jin dynasty capital at Luoyang and capture Emperor Huai; 30,000 residents in the city are massacred.

=== By topic ===
==== Religion ====
- July 2 – Pope Miltiades succeeds Eusebius as the 32nd pope of Rome.
- The Donatist schism begins in the African Church.

== Deaths ==
- April 23 – Sima Yue (or Yuanchao), Chinese prince and regent
- May 5
  - Galerius, Roman emperor (b. c.258)
  - Wang Yan, Chinese official and politician (b. 256)
- October 7 – Gou Xi (or Daojiang), Chinese inspector and general
- November 25 – Peter I, patriarch of Alexandria
- December 3 – Diocletian, Roman emperor (b. 244)
- Domitius Alexander, Roman emperor and usuper
- Wang Mi (or Zigu), Chinese general and rebel leader
