= Athenodorus of Byzantium =

Bishop of Byzantium from 144 to 148

- Bishop of Byzantium
- Installed: 144
- Term ended: 148
- Predecessor: Polycarpus II of Byzantium
- Successor: Euzois of Byzantium

Personal details
- Died: 148
- Denomination: Early Christianity

Athenodorus of Byzantium (Greek: Ἀθηνόδωρος), also known as Athenogenes (Ἀθηνογένης; died 148) was bishop of Byzantium from 144 to 148. During his years of office, when the city was administered by Zeuxippus, there was a significant increase in the Christian population. Athenodorus commissioned the construction of a second cathedral in Elaea, which was later renovated by Roman emperor Constantine the Great, who wanted to be buried there. Eventually, he was not buried there, as it was deemed improper for Emperors to be buried outside Byzantium. The cathedral was devoted to the martyrdoms of Eleazar and of the seven children in 2 Maccabees.

== Notes and references ==
Titles of the Great Christian Church
Preceded by Polycarpus II	Bishop of Byzantium; 144 – 148	Succeeded by Euzois
