= 336 =

336 in various calendars
Gregorian calendar	336; CCCXXXVI
Ab urbe condita	1089
Assyrian calendar	5086
Balinese saka calendar	257–258
Bengali calendar	−258 – −257
Berber calendar	1286
Buddhist calendar	880
Burmese calendar	−302
Byzantine calendar	5844–5845
Chinese calendar	乙未年 (Wood Goat); 3033 or 2826 — to — 丙申年 (Fire Monkey); 3034 or 2827
Coptic calendar	52–53
Discordian calendar	1502
Ethiopian calendar	328–329
Hebrew calendar	4096–4097
- Hindu calendars
Vikram Samvat	392–393
Shaka Samvat	257–258
Kali Yuga	3436–3437
Holocene calendar	10336
Iranian calendar	286 BP – 285 BP
Islamic calendar	295 BH – 294 BH
Javanese calendar	217–218
Julian calendar	336; CCCXXXVI
Korean calendar	2669
Minguo calendar	1576 before ROC 民前1576年
Nanakshahi calendar	−1132
Seleucid era	647/648 AG
Thai solar calendar	878–879
Tibetan calendar	阴木羊年 (female Wood-Goat); 462 or 81 or −691 — to — 阳火猴年 (male Fire-Monkey); 463 or 82 or −690

Year 336 (CCCXXXVI) was a leap year starting on Thursday of the Julian calendar. At the time, it was known as the Year of the Consulship of Nepotianus and Facundus (or, less frequently, year 1089 Ab urbe condita). The denomination 336 for this year has been used since the early medieval period, when the Anno Domini calendar era became the prevalent method in Europe for naming years.

== Events ==
=== By place ===
==== Roman Empire ====
- The military successes of Emperor Constantine I result in most of Dacia being reconquered by the Roman Empire.
- The first recorded customs tariff is in use in Palmyra.

=== By topic ===
==== Religion ====
- January 18 – Pope Mark succeeds Pope Sylvester I as the 34th pope of the Catholic Church.
- Pope Mark begins to build the basilica of San Marco; the church is devoted to St. Mark.
- Arius, Alexandrian priest, collapses in the street in Constantinople (approximate date).
- Pope Mark dies at Rome, after an 11-month reign. No successor is immediately found.
- December 25 – The first celebration of Christmas is recorded.

== Births ==
- Chi Chao (or Jingyu), Chinese advisor and politician (d. 377)
- Murong De, Chinese emperor of the Xianbei state (d. 405)
- Richū, emperor of Japan (approximate date)

== Deaths ==
- October 7 – Mark, pope of the Catholic Church
- Arius, Cyrenaic presbyter and priest (b. 256)
- Gan Bao (or Kan Pao), Chinese historian
- Murong Ren (or Qiannian), Chinese general
