= Euzois of Byzantium =

Bishop of Byzantium from 148 to 154

- Bishop of Byzantium
- Installed: 148
- Term ended: 154
- Predecessor: Athenodorus of Byzantium
- Successor: Laurence of Byzantium

Personal details
- Died: 154
- Denomination: Early Christianity

Euzois of Byzantium (Greek: Εὐζώιος; died 154) was the bishop of Byzantium for six years (148 – 154). He succeeded bishop Athenodorus of Byzantium. He was in office during the persecution of Christians by Roman emperor Antoninus Pius. His successor was Laurence of Byzantium.

== Bibliography ==
- www.ec-patr.org.

Titles of the Great Christian Church
Preceded by Athenodorus	Bishop of Byzantium; 148 – 154	Succeeded by Laurence
