= 244 =

244 in various calendars
- Gregorian calendar: 244; CCXLIV
- Ab urbe condita: 997
- Assyrian calendar: 4994
- Balinese saka calendar: 165–166
- Bengali calendar: −350 – −349
- Berber calendar: 1194
- Buddhist calendar: 788
- Burmese calendar: −394
- Byzantine calendar: 5752–5753
- Chinese calendar: 癸亥年 (Water Pig); 2941 or 2734 — to — 甲子年 (Wood Rat); 2942 or 2735
- Coptic calendar: −40 – −39
- Discordian calendar: 1410
- Ethiopian calendar: 236–237
- Hebrew calendar: 4004–4005
- Hindu calendars
- Vikram Samvat: 300–301
- Shaka Samvat: 165–166
- Kali Yuga: 3344–3345
- Holocene calendar: 10244
- Iranian calendar: 378 BP – 377 BP
- Islamic calendar: 390 BH – 389 BH
- Javanese calendar: 122–123
- Julian calendar: 244; CCXLIV
- Korean calendar: 2577
- Minguo calendar: 1668 before ROC 民前1668年
- Nanakshahi calendar: −1224
- Seleucid era: 555/556 AG
- Thai solar calendar: 786–787
- Tibetan calendar: ཆུ་མོ་ཕག་ལོ་ (female Water-Boar); 370 or −11 or −783 — to — ཤིང་ཕོ་བྱི་བ་ལོ་ (male Wood-Rat); 371 or −10 or −782

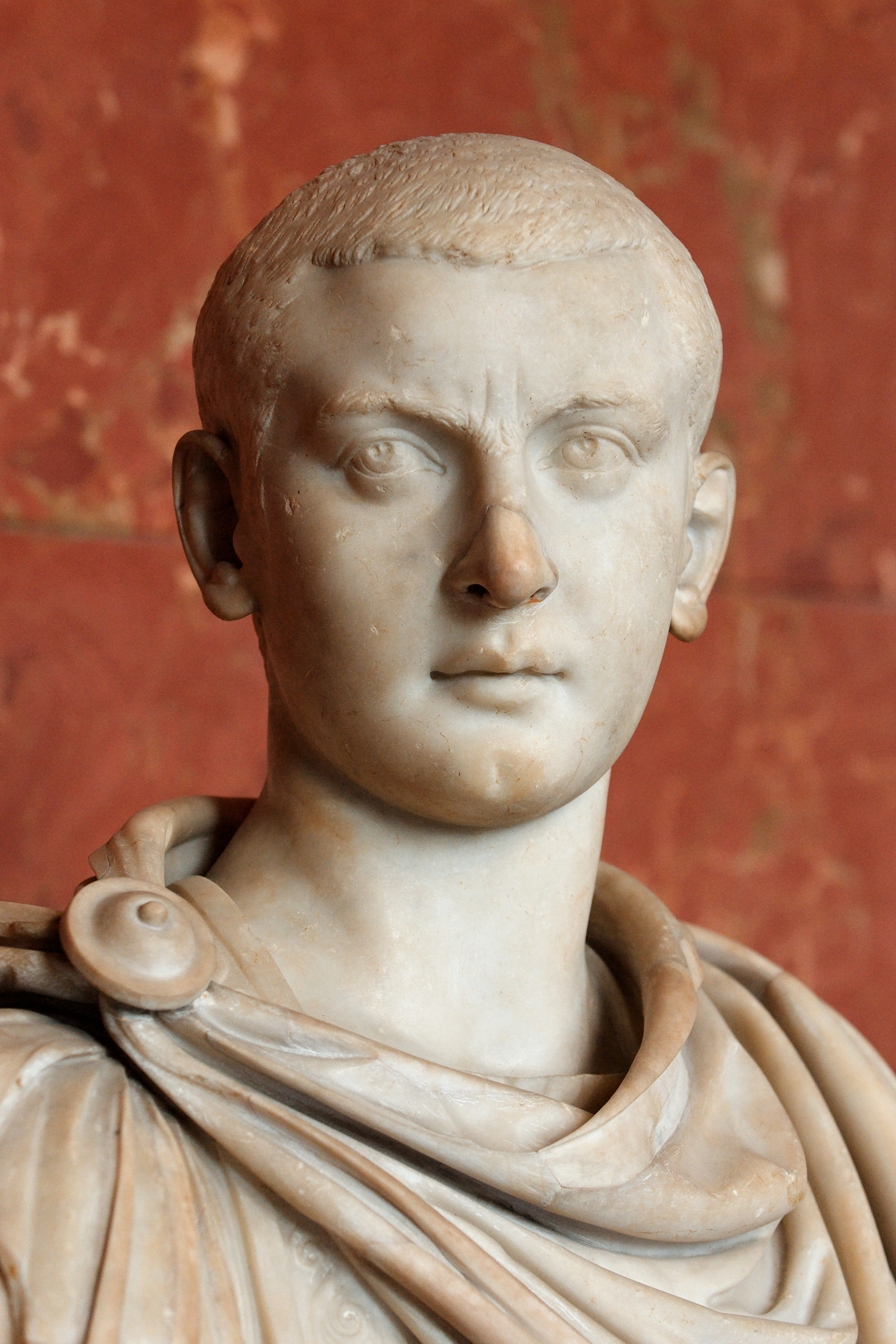
Emperor Gordianus III

Year 244 (CCXLIV) was a leap year starting on Monday of the Julian calendar. At the time, it was known as the Year of the Consulship of Armenius and Aemilianus (or, less frequently, year 997 Ab urbe condita). The denomination 244 for this year has been used since the early medieval period, when the Anno Domini calendar era became the prevalent method in Europe for naming years.

== Events ==
=== By place ===
==== Roman Empire ====
- Around February 11 – Battle of Misiche: King Shapur I and his Iranian army defeats the Roman army.
- February 11 – Emperor Gordian III is murdered by mutinous soldiers in Zaitha (Mesopotamia). A mound is raised at Carchemish in his memory.
- Philip the Arab (Marcus Julius Philippus) declares himself co-emperor, and makes a controversial peace with the Sassanian Empire, withdrawing from their territory and giving Shapur 500,000 gold pieces. The Sassanians occupy Armenia.
- Philip the Arab is recognized by the Roman Senate as the new Roman Emperor with the honorific Augustus. He nominates his son Philippus, age 6, with the title of Caesar and makes him heir to the throne; gives his brother Priscus supreme power (rector Orientis) in the Eastern provinces; and begins construction of the city of Shahba (Syria) in the province of his birth.
- The vassal Upper Mesopotamian kingdom of Osroene is absorbed into the Roman Empire, its last ruler being Abgar (XI) Farhat Bar Ma’nu.

==== Asia ====
- Battle of Xingshi: Shu Han defeats the Chinese state of Cao Wei.

==== Korea ====
- The Goguryeo–Wei War is fought between the Korean kingdom Goguryeo and the Chinese state Cao Wei.

=== By topic ===
==== Art and Science ====
- Plotinus, Greek philosopher, escapes the bloodshed that accompanies the murder of Gordianus III and makes his way to Antioch. Back in Rome he founds his Neoplatonist school and attracts disciples like Porphyry, Castricius Firmus and Eustochius of Alexandria.
- 244–249 – Bust of Philip the Arab (in Braccio Nuovo, Vatican Museums, Rome).

==== Commerce ====
- The silver content of the Roman denarius falls to 0.5 percent under emperor Philippus I, down from 28 percent under Gordian III.

==== Religion ====
- 244–245 – Last phase of construction of the house-style Dura-Europos synagogue in Syria, one of the oldest to survive (wall-paintings in the National Museum of Damascus, Syria).

== Births ==
- December 22 – Diocletian, Roman emperor (d. 311)
- Alexander of Constantinople, bishop of Byzantium (approximate date)

== Deaths ==
- February 11 – Gordian III, Roman emperor (b. 225)
- Cao Xun, Chinese prince of the Cao Wei state (b. 231)
- Ge Xuan (or Xiaoxian), Chinese Taoist (b. 164)
- Zhang Cheng (or Zhongsi), Chinese general (b. 178)
