= 254 =

254 in various calendars
Gregorian calendar	254; CCLIV
Ab urbe condita	1007
Assyrian calendar	5004
Balinese saka calendar	175–176
Bengali calendar	−340 – −339
Berber calendar	1204
Buddhist calendar	798
Burmese calendar	−384
Byzantine calendar	5762–5763
Chinese calendar	癸酉年 (Water Rooster); 2951 or 2744 — to — 甲戌年 (Wood Dog); 2952 or 2745
Coptic calendar	−30 – −29
Discordian calendar	1420
Ethiopian calendar	246–247
Hebrew calendar	4014–4015
- Hindu calendars
Vikram Samvat	310–311
Shaka Samvat	175–176
Kali Yuga	3354–3355
Holocene calendar	10254
Iranian calendar	368 BP – 367 BP
Islamic calendar	379 BH – 378 BH
Javanese calendar	133–134
Julian calendar	254; CCLIV
Korean calendar	2587
Minguo calendar	1658 before ROC 民前1658年
Nanakshahi calendar	−1214
Seleucid era	565/566 AG
Thai solar calendar	796–797
Tibetan calendar	ཆུ་མོ་བྱ་ལོ་ (female Water-Bird); 380 or −1 or −773 — to — ཤིང་ཕོ་ཁྱི་ལོ་ (male Wood-Dog); 381 or 0 or −772

Year 254 (CCLIV) was a common year starting on Sunday of the Julian calendar. At the time, it was known as the Year of the Consulship of Valerianus and Gallienus (or, less frequently, year 1007 Ab urbe condita). The denomination 254 for this year has been used since the early medieval period, when the Anno Domini calendar era became the prevalent method in Europe for naming years.

== Events ==
=== By place ===
==== Roman Empire ====
- The Roman Empire is threatened by several peoples on their borders: the Germanic confederations, such as the Franks on the Middle Rhine, the Alemanni on the upper Rhine and Danube, and the Marcomanni facing the provinces at Noricum and Raetia. On land the confederation of Goths threaten the lower Danube provinces, and on the sea they threaten the shores of Thracia, Bithynia et Pontus, and Cappadocia. In the eastern provinces, the Sassanid Persians had the previous year defeated a Roman field army at Barballisos, and afterwards plundered the defenseless provinces. This period of time is called today the Crisis of the Third Century.

=== By topic ===
==== Religion ====
- May 12 – Pope Stephen I succeeds Pope Lucius I.

== Deaths ==
- March 5 – Lucius I, bishop of Rome
- Li Feng (or Anguo), Chinese official and politician
- Tiberius Julius Pharsanzes, Roman client king
- Xiahou Xuan (or Taichu), Chinese general and politician (b. 209)
- Zhang Ni (or Boqi), Chinese general, official and politician
