= Laurence of Byzantium =

Bishop of Byzantium from 154 to 166

- Bishop of Byzantium
- Installed: 154
- Term ended: 166
- Predecessor: Euzois of Byzantium
- Successor: Alypius of Byzantium

Personal details
- Died: 166
- Denomination: Early Christianity

Laurence of Byzantium (Greek: Λαυρέντιος; died 166) was the bishop of Byzantium for eleven years and six months (154 – 166). He succeeded bishop Euzois of Byzantium. He was in office during the rule of Roman emperors Antoninus Pius and Marcus Aurelius. His successor was Alypius of Byzantium.

== Bibliography ==
- www.ec-patr.org.

Titles of the Great Christian Church
Preceded by Euzois	Bishop of Byzantium; 154 – 166	Succeeded by Alypius
