= 184 BC =

184 BC in various calendars
- Gregorian calendar: 184 BC; CLXXXIV BC
- Ab urbe condita: 570
- Ancient Egypt era: XXXIII dynasty, 140
- Pharaoh: Ptolemy V Epiphanes, 20
- Ancient Greek Olympiad (summer): 149th Olympiad (victor)¹
- Assyrian calendar: 4567
- Balinese saka calendar: N/A
- Bengali calendar: −777 – −776
- Berber calendar: 767
- Buddhist calendar: 361
- Burmese calendar: −821
- Byzantine calendar: 5325–5326
- Chinese calendar: 丙辰年 (Fire Dragon); 2514 or 2307 — to — 丁巳年 (Fire Snake); 2515 or 2308
- Coptic calendar: −467 – −466
- Discordian calendar: 983
- Ethiopian calendar: −191 – −190
- Hebrew calendar: 3577–3578
- Hindu calendars
- Vikram Samvat: −127 – −126
- Shaka Samvat: N/A
- Kali Yuga: 2917–2918
- Holocene calendar: 9817
- Iranian calendar: 805 BP – 804 BP
- Islamic calendar: 830 BH – 829 BH
- Javanese calendar: N/A
- Julian calendar: N/A
- Korean calendar: 2150
- Minguo calendar: 2095 before ROC 民前2095年
- Nanakshahi calendar: −1651
- Seleucid era: 128/129 AG
- Thai solar calendar: 359–360
- Tibetan calendar: མེ་ཕོ་འབྲུག་ལོ་ (male Fire-Dragon) −57 or −438 or −1210 — to — མེ་མོ་སྦྲུལ་ལོ་ (female Fire-Snake) −56 or −437 or −1209

Year 184 BC was a year of the pre-Julian Roman calendar. At the time it was known as the Year of the Consulship of Pulcher and Licinus (or, less frequently, year 570 Ab urbe condita). The denomination 184 BC for this year has been used since the early medieval period, when the Anno Domini calendar era became the prevalent method in Europe for naming years.

== Events ==
=== By place ===
==== Roman Republic ====
- Cato the Elder, along with his colleague, Lucius Valerius Flaccus, are elected censors in Rome. Already the champion of the ancient, austere Roman way of life, Cato inaugurates a puritanical campaign. He aims at preserving the mos maiorum ("ancestral custom") and combating all Greek influences, which he believes are undermining the older Roman standards of morality. He passes measures taxing luxury and strictly revises the list of persons eligible for the Senate. Abuses by tax gatherers are brought under control, and public building is promoted as a worthy cause.
- With concerns rising in Rome over whether Philip V of Macedon is preparing for a new war with the Romans, Appius Claudius Pulcher is sent at the head of an embassy into Macedonia and Greece to observe Philip's activities.
- The town of Pisaurum is established by the Romans as a colony in the territory of the Picentes, a tribe living in the Marche on the Adriatic.
- The oldest known basilica, the Basilica Porcia, is completed in Rome by Cato the Elder during the time he is censor. The building is used by the Romans for transacting business and disposing of legal matters.

==== China ====
- Empress Lü has Emperor Qianshao of Han deposed and executed. Qianshao had vowed to kill his enemies after learning that his mother was a concubine and that she had been put to death by Empress Lü. Emperor Houshao of Han, a half-brother of Qianshao, ascends to the throne.
- Around this time, Empress Lü outlaws the trade of iron and horses with the vassal state of Nanyue in present-day Vietnam and southern China, being concerned by its military strength. In response, Nanyue's king Zhao Tuo ends his vassal status, declares himself emperor and attacks the neighbouring vassal kingdom of Changsha, seizing a few border towns.

== Births ==
- Liu Wu, Chinese prince of the Han dynasty (approximate date)

== Deaths ==
- Liu Gong, Chinese emperor of the Han dynasty (b. 193 BC)
- Titus Macchius Plautus, Roman comic dramatist, whose works, loosely adapted from Greek plays, established a truly Roman drama in the Latin language (b. c. 254 BC)
