= 219 =

219 in various calendars
- Gregorian calendar: 219; CCXIX
- Ab urbe condita: 972
- Assyrian calendar: 4969
- Balinese saka calendar: 140–141
- Bengali calendar: −375 – −374
- Berber calendar: 1169
- Buddhist calendar: 763
- Burmese calendar: −419
- Byzantine calendar: 5727–5728
- Chinese calendar: 戊戌年 (Earth Dog); 2916 or 2709 — to — 己亥年 (Earth Pig); 2917 or 2710
- Coptic calendar: −65 – −64
- Discordian calendar: 1385
- Ethiopian calendar: 211–212
- Hebrew calendar: 3979–3980
- Hindu calendars
- Vikram Samvat: 275–276
- Shaka Samvat: 140–141
- Kali Yuga: 3319–3320
- Holocene calendar: 10219
- Iranian calendar: 403 BP – 402 BP
- Islamic calendar: 415 BH – 414 BH
- Javanese calendar: 96–98
- Julian calendar: 219; CCXIX
- Korean calendar: 2552
- Minguo calendar: 1693 before ROC 民前1693年
- Nanakshahi calendar: −1249
- Seleucid era: 530/531 AG
- Thai solar calendar: 761–762
- Tibetan calendar: ས་ཕོ་ཁྱི་ལོ་ (male Earth-Dog); 345 or −36 or −808 — to — ས་མོ་ཕག་ལོ་ (female Earth-Boar); 346 or −35 or −807

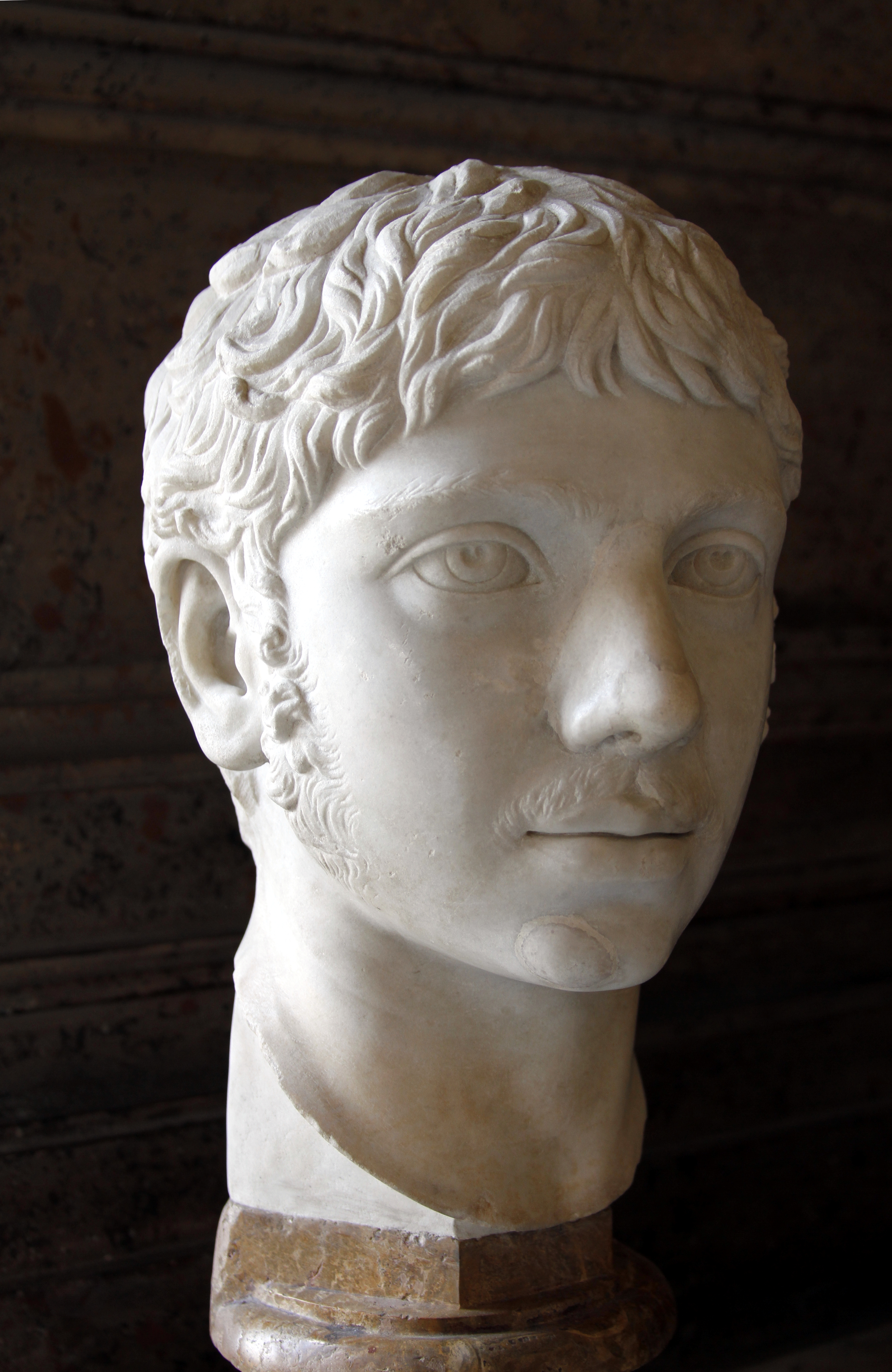
Emperor Elagabalus

Year 219 (CCXIX) was a common year starting on Friday of the Julian calendar. At the time, it was known in Rome as the Year of the Consulship of Antonius and Sacerdos (or, less frequently, year 972 Ab urbe condita). The denomination 219 for this year has been used since the early medieval period, when the Anno Domini calendar era became the prevalent method in Europe for naming years.

== Events ==
=== By place ===
==== Roman Empire ====
- Imperator Marcus Aurelius Antoninus Augustus (Elagabalus) and Quintus Tineius Sacerdos become Roman Consuls.
- Julia Maesa arranges, for her grandson Elagabalus, a marriage with Julia Paula. The wedding is a lavish ceremony and Paula is given the honorific title of Augusta.
- Legions III Gallica and IV Scythica are disbanded by Elagabalus after their leaders, Verus and Gellius Maximus, rebel.
- Emperor Elagabalus, age 15, is initiated into the worship of the Phrygian gods Cybele and Attis.

==== India ====
- The reign of Pulona, Satavahana king of Andhra, begins in India.

==== China ====
- The Battle of Mount Dingjun ends with Liu Bei emerging victorious. He declares himself king of Hanzhong afterwards.
- Guan Yu floods the fortress at Fan (present-day Fancheng District, Xiangyang, Hubei) in the Battle of Fancheng, while Lü Meng captures his base in Jing Province. Guan Yu retreats to Maicheng, falls into an ambush, and gets captured by Sun Quan's forces.
- Cao Cao controls the Yellow River basin and northern China. Sun Quan rules southern China. Liu Bei controls Yi Province (covering present-day Sichuan and Chongqing).
- Tuoba Liwei becomes the first chieftain of the Tuoba clan of the Xianbei people.

== Births ==
- Hua He (or Yongxian), Chinese official and historian (d. 278)
- Sun Jun (or Ziyuan), Chinese general and regent (d. 256)

== Deaths ==
- Jiang Qin (or Gongyi), Chinese general serving under Sun Quan
- Lu Ji (or Gongji), Chinese scholar, official and politician (b. 188)
- Marcus Munatius Sulla Cerialis, Roman governor and politician
- Pang De (or Lingming), Chinese general serving under Cao Cao
- Sima Fang (or Jianong), Chinese official and politician (b. 149)
- Sun Jiao (or Shulang), Chinese general serving under Sun Quan
- Xiahou Yuan (or Miaocai), Chinese general serving under Cao Cao
- Yang Xiu (or Dezi), Chinese official, adviser and chancellor (b. 175)
- Zhang Zhongjing, Chinese physician and pharmacologist (b. 150)
