= Alypius of Byzantium =

Bishop of Byzantium from 166 to 169

- Bishop of Byzantium
- Installed: 166
- Term ended: 169
- Predecessor: Laurence of Byzantium
- Successor: Pertinax of Byzantium

Personal details
- Died: 169
- Denomination: Early Christianity

Alypius of Byzantium or Olympius (Ancient Greek: Ἀλύπιος or Ὀλύμπιος; died 169) was the bishop of Byzantium during the second half of the 2nd century AD. The date when he became the bishop of Byzantium is not known for certain but is most likely somewhere between 166 and 167. Additionally, the length of his term is not known, but it is believed to be three years (166 – 169). He succeeded bishop Laurence of Byzantium and his successor was Pertinax of Byzantium.

== Bibliography ==
- www.ec-patr.org.

Titles of the Great Christian Church
| Preceded by Laurence | Bishop of Byzantium; 166 – 169 | Succeeded by Pertinax |
