= Pertinax of Byzantium =

Bishop of Byzantium from 169 to 187

- Bishop of Byzantium
- Installed: 169
- Term ended: 187
- Predecessor: Alypius of Byzantium
- Successor: Olympianus of Byzantium

Personal details
- Died: 187
- Denomination: Eastern Christianity

Pertinax of Byzantium (Greek: Περτίναξ; died 187) was Bishop of Byzantium from 169 until his death in 187. Information on his life is mainly drawn from the works of Dorotheus of Tyre, according to whom he was originally a senior officer of the Roman Empire based in Thrace. He contracted a strong bout of some disease, and in the midst of his illness he had heard the rumors of miracles occurring amongst the adherents of a new growing religion - Christianity. He sought advice from Bishop Alypius of Byzantium; when his disease was cured, he believed it was the result of Alypius' prayers and the grace of God, and converted to Christianity. Shortly afterwards, he was ordained a priest by Alypius and succeeded him as bishop after his death, a position he would serve to his own repose.

== Notes and references ==
Titles of the Great Christian Church
Preceded by Alypius	Bishop of Byzantium; 169 – 187	Succeeded by Olympianus
