= Guan Lu =

Chinese diviner (209–256)

Guan Lu 管輅
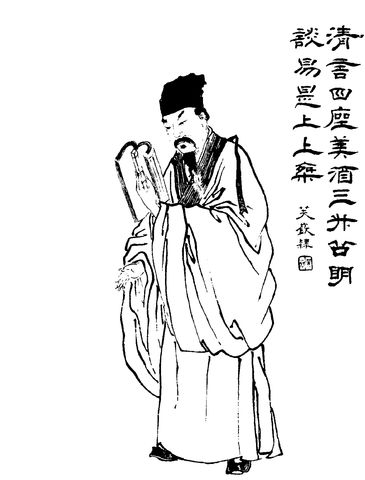
- A Qing dynasty illustration of Guan Lu
- Born: 209 (Note: Guan Lu's biography in the Sanguozhi recorded that he died at the age of 48 (by East Asian age reckoning) in the 3rd year of the Zhengyuan era (254-256) of Cao Mao's reign. By calculation, his year of birth should be 209.); Pingyuan County, Shandong
- Died: 256 (aged 47)
- Other name: Gongming (公明)
- Occupation: Diviner

Guan Lu (209–256), courtesy name Gongming, was a diviner who lived during the late Eastern Han dynasty and Three Kingdoms period of China.

== Anecdotes ==
=== Putting the dead to rest ===
At one time, Wang Ji heard of Guan Lu's fame and invited him to visit him. One of Wang Ji's other guests said that his wife was suffering from severe headaches while his son felt pain in his heart. Wang Ji then asked Guan Lu to find out why. Guan Lu used the casting lots method and told them that there were two dead bodies buried in the west corner of the main hall and that a wall had been built across them. One of them held a spear while the other carried a bow and arrows. The spearman died from a gash in his head while the archer died after being stabbed in the heart. Wang Ji then ordered his men to start digging and they found two badly decomposed bodies fitting exactly the description given by Guan Lu. Guan Lu then instructed them to rebury the bodies three miles outside the walls. After that, the woman and the boy recovered from their headaches and heart pains.

=== Extending Zhao Yang's lifespan ===
In another anecdote, Guan Lu once saw a youth plowing a field, approached him and asked for his name. The youth, named Zhao Yang, was only 19 years old then. Guan Lu sensed an aura of death around Zhao Yang and predicted that he would die within three days, so he advised him on how to avoid his unfortunate fate. He said, "Tomorrow, go to the forest in the south. You will see two men sitting on boulders beneath a lofty tree playing chess. The sinister-looking one will be wearing white and facing south. The other man, who looks kind, will be wearing red. They will be so deeply engrossed in their game that they will not notice anyone approaching. You must then kneel down and humbly present them food and wine. After they have accepted your offerings, you must prostrate yourself and tearfully beg them to grant you an extension on your lifespan. You will then gain an increased span of life. Above all things, you must not tell them that I told you to do this." The following day, the man in red replaced the number 1 with the number 9, which meant that he had altered Zhao Yang's fate to allow him to live until the age of 99. The two men, who were apparently deities in charge of deciding people's lifespans, then told Zhao Yang to go back to Guan Lu and warn him that if he attempted to meddle with the ways of fate again, he would suffer punishment from Heaven.

=== Predicting the future for Deng Yang and He Yan ===
Guan Lu also cast lots to predict the lives of Deng Yang and He Yan, two officials who served in the state of Cao Wei during the Three Kingdoms period. He told them, "Gaoxin and Gaoyang aided Shun; the Duke of Zhou aided the young King Cheng of the Zhou dynasty. They were kindly, modest and happy. You, Sirs, enjoy high prestige and power, but there are many who fear you and few who respect you. You are not careful to walk in the way of good fortune. Now the nose is an eminence. If an eminence retains its characteristic, thereby it remains in honour. But is it not that blue flies gather to foul objects and the lofty fears a fall? I would wish you to give of your abundance for the good of the poor and avoid walking in the wrong road. Then indeed may you reach the highest dignity, and the blue flies will disperse".

After discussing this conversation with his maternal uncle, Guan Lu then said, "Deng Yang's gait is that of one whose sinews are loosed from his bones, and his pulse is unsteady. When he would stand, he totters as a man without limbs. This is the aspect of a disembodied soul. He Yan looks as if his soul was about to quit its habitation. He is bloodless, and what should be solid in him is mere vapor. He looks like rotten wood. This is the aspect of a soul even now in the dark valley. Both these men will certainly soon die a violent death, and none need fear them". At the time, Guan's uncle became greatly angered, and scolded Guan for being reckless.

Soon afterwards, both Deng Yang and He Yan met their ends in the aftermath of the Incident at the Gaoping Tombs in February 249, just as Guan Lu predicted; Guan's uncle was deeply impressed. As a result, Guan Lu became famous for being one of the most skilled diviners in his time, but there were others who saw him as a mad man.

== Works ==
Guan Lu wrote a number of texts, including:

- "A method of contacting spirits using the Yi Jing" (周易通靈決)
- "Summary of a method of contacting spirits using the Yi Jing" (周易通靈要決)
- "A classic on destroying manias" (破躁經)
- "Winnowing divination" (占箕)

These texts were lost over time in the Three Kingdoms period; only their titles were recorded in history.

== In Romance of the Three Kingdoms ==
Guan Lu appears as a character in the 14th-century historical novel Romance of the Three Kingdoms, which romanticises the events in the late Eastern Han dynasty and Three Kingdoms period. In Chapter 69, around the year 217, Cao Cao summons Guan Lu and orders him to use his divination skills to predict the future. Guan Lu predicts that Xiahou Yuan will be killed in action at the Battle of Mount Dingjun, Lu Su will die of illness, a fire will break out in Xuchang, etc. All his predictions came true. Historically, however, Guan Lu was only around eight years old in 217.

== See also ==
- Lists of people of the Three Kingdoms
