= AD 184 =

184 in various calendars
- Gregorian calendar: 184; CLXXXIV
- Ab urbe condita: 937
- Assyrian calendar: 4934
- Balinese saka calendar: 105–106
- Bengali calendar: −410 – −409
- Berber calendar: 1134
- Buddhist calendar: 728
- Burmese calendar: −454
- Byzantine calendar: 5692–5693
- Chinese calendar: 癸亥年 (Water Pig); 2881 or 2674 — to — 甲子年 (Wood Rat); 2882 or 2675
- Coptic calendar: −100 – −99
- Discordian calendar: 1350
- Ethiopian calendar: 176–177
- Hebrew calendar: 3944–3945
- Hindu calendars
- Vikram Samvat: 240–241
- Shaka Samvat: 105–106
- Kali Yuga: 3284–3285
- Holocene calendar: 10184
- Iranian calendar: 438 BP – 437 BP
- Islamic calendar: 451 BH – 450 BH
- Javanese calendar: 60–61
- Julian calendar: 184; CLXXXIV
- Korean calendar: 2517
- Minguo calendar: 1728 before ROC 民前1728年
- Nanakshahi calendar: −1284
- Seleucid era: 495/496 AG
- Thai solar calendar: 726–727
- Tibetan calendar: ཆུ་མོ་ཕག་ལོ་ (female Water-Boar); 310 or −71 or −843 — to — ཤིང་ཕོ་བྱི་བ་ལོ་ (male Wood-Rat); 311 or −70 or −842

Year 184 (CLXXXIV) was a leap year starting on Wednesday of the Julian calendar. At the time, it was known as the Year of the Consulship of Eggius and Aelianus (or, less frequently, year 937 Ab urbe condita). The denomination 184 for this year has been used since the early medieval period, when the Anno Domini calendar era became the prevalent method in Europe for naming years.

== Events ==
=== By place ===
==== China ====
- The Yellow Turban Rebellion and Liang Province Rebellion break out in China.
- The Disasters of the Partisan Prohibitions ends.
- Zhang Jue leads the peasant revolt against Emperor Ling of Han of the Eastern Han dynasty. Heading for the capital of Luoyang, his massive and undisciplined army (360,000 men), burns and destroys government offices and outposts.
- June – Ling of Han places his brother-in-law, He Jin, in command of the imperial army and sends them to attack the Yellow Turban rebels.
- Winter – Zhang Jue dies of illness while his brothers Zhang Bao and Zhang Liang are killed in battles against Han imperial forces. The Yellow Turban rebels become scattered.
- Last (6th) year of Guanghe era and the start of Zhongping era of the Eastern Han dynasty.

==== Korea ====
- King Gogukcheon (Gaonanwu) of Goguryeo (Gaogouli) pushes Chinese armies back to Liaodong.
- Beolhyu becomes king of Silla.

== Births ==
- Guo Nüwang, Chinese empress of the Cao Wei state (d. 235)
- Origen, Christian scholar and theologian (approximate date)
- Sun Yi, Chinese general (d. 204)
- Wang Xiang, Chinese official and politician (d. 268)

== Deaths ==
- June 6 – Qiao Xuan (or Gongzu), Chinese official (b. 110)
- Adalla of Silla, Korean ruler (House of Park)
- Zhang Jue, Chinese leader of the Yellow Turban Rebellion
