= 100s (decade) =

Decade

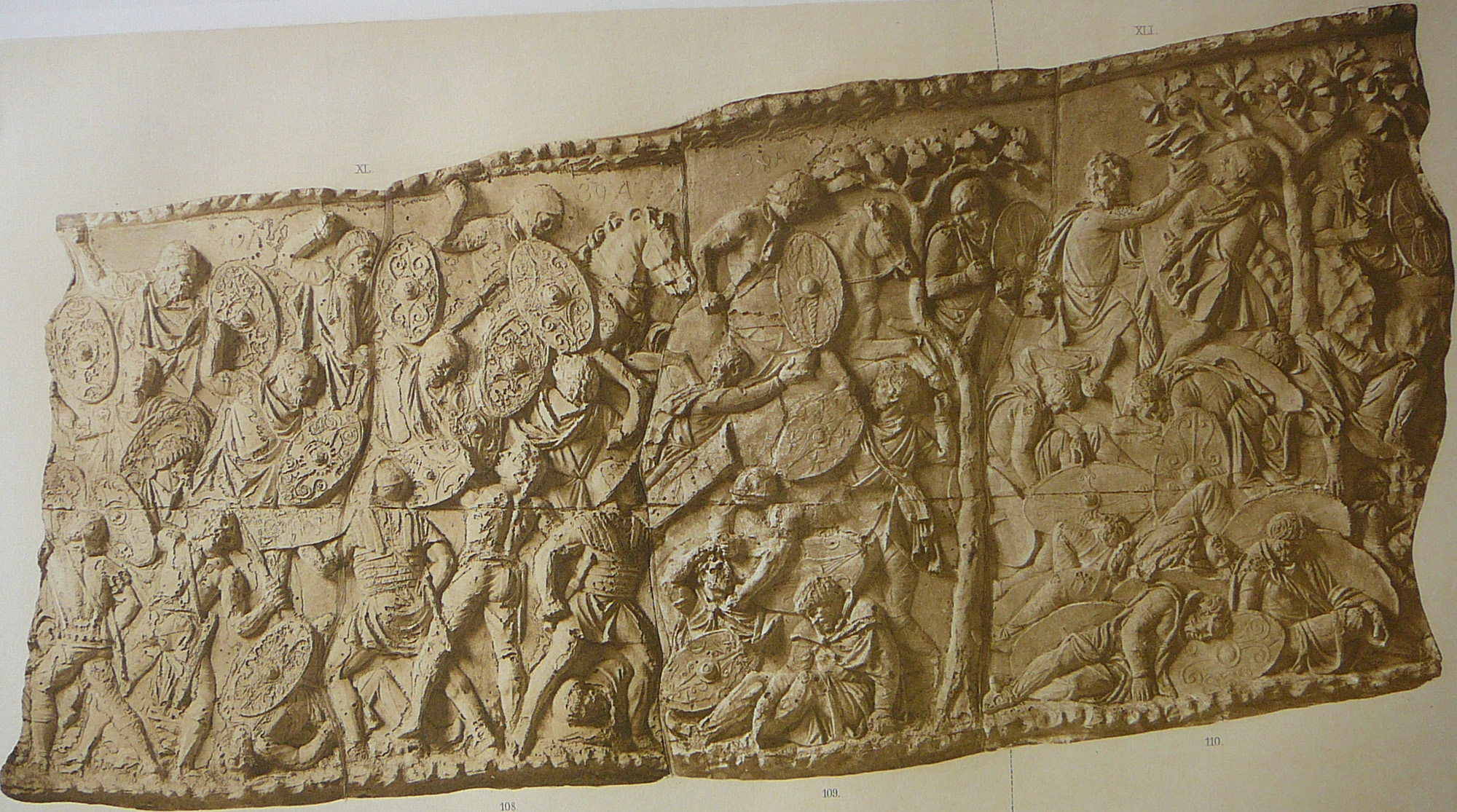
Stone tablet depicting fighting in Trajan's Dacian Wars (101–106). After the conquest in 106, Dacia's rich gold mines were secured, which then contributed around 700 million Denarii per annum to the Roman economy.

The 100s was a decade that ran from January 1, AD 100, to December 31, AD 109.

During this period, the Roman Empire continued to expand its territory. Emperor Trajan, who ruled from 98 to 117 AD, launched several successful military campaigns, including the Dacian wars (101–106) and the possibly violent conquest of Nabataea (106). The conquest of Dacia in 106 secured its rich gold mines, and it is estimated that Dacia then contributed 700 million Denarii per annum to the Roman economy, providing finance for Rome's future campaigns and assisting with the rapid expansion of Roman towns throughout Europe. Furthermore, the conquest changed the balance of power in the region, leading to a renewed anti-Roman alliance of local Germanic and Celtic tribes. However, within the annexed territory and surrounds, the material advantages of being part of the Roman system were not lost on the majority of the surviving Dacian aristocracy. Thus began the process by which most modern Romanian historians and linguists believe that many of the Dacians subsequently became romanized (see Origin of Romanians). Alimenta, a Roman welfare program that had been initiated by Nerva in 98, continued to be in operation during this decade.

In East Asia, the Han dynasty saw a succession of rulers: Emperor He was succeeded by Emperor Shang in 106, who was succeeded by Emperor An that same year. However, the young emperor An did not rule in his own right, with Deng Sui instead being regent from 106 onwards. Deng Sui showed herself to be an able regent who did not tolerate corruption, even by her own family members. She also carried out criminal law reforms. For example, in 107, she issued an edict that extended the period for death penalty appeals. She cut the expenses of the royal court, like the making of expensive handicrafts such as jade and ivory carvings, and sent home palace attendants with superfluous functions. She also demanded less tribute from the provinces. While Empress, she twice opened the imperial granaries to feed the hungry; forced the reduction of income landlords received from the land they rented out; she repaired waterways and cut court rituals and banquets. She also saw rebellions from the South Xiongnu and Qiang, the latter of which would not be quelled until the next decade. In West Asia, Parthia saw a revolt by Osroes I against Pacorus II in 109. South America saw the emergence of the Moche culture.

Emperor Trajan corresponded with Pliny the Younger on the subject of how to deal with the Christians of Pontus. The theologian Edward Burton wrote that this correspondence shows there were no laws condemning Christians at that time. There was an "abundance of precedent (common law) for suppressing foreign superstitions" but no general law which prescribed "the form of trial or the punishment; nor had there been any special enactment which made Christianity a crime". Even so, Pliny implies that putting Christians on trial was not rare, and while Christians in his district had committed no illegal acts like robbery or adultery, Pliny "put persons to death, though they were guilty of no crime, and without the authority of any law" and believed his emperor would accept his actions. Trajan did, and sent back a qualified approval. He told Pliny to continue to prosecute Christians, but not to accept anonymous denunciations in the interests of justice as well as of "the spirit of the age". Non-citizens who admitted to being Christians and refused to recant, however, were to be executed "for obstinacy". Citizens were sent to Rome for trial. Mithraism, a Roman mystery religion viewed as a rival of early Christianity, had developed by this time.

Trajan invested heavily in the provision of popular amusements. He carried out a "massive reconstruction" of the Circus Maximus, which was already the Empire's biggest and best-appointed circuit for the immensely popular sport of chariot racing. The Circus also hosted religious theatrical spectacles and games, and public processions on a grand scale. Trajan's reconstruction, completed by 103, was modestly described by Trajan himself as "adequate" for the Roman people. Furthermore, the decade saw the construction of Trajan's Bridge, the Baths of Trajan, and Roman roads such as Via Traiana and Via Traiana Nova. The Buddhacharita, a Sanskrit poem describing the birth and reign of the Third Mauryan Emperor Ashoka, was composed around this time. Plutarch wrote Parallel Lives, a series of 48 biographies of famous men, arranged in pairs to illuminate their common moral virtues or failings. Tacitus wrote Histories, which covers the history of Rome from 69 to 96. Juvenal wrote Satires, a collection of satirical poems. Furthermore, lions had become extinct in Greece by this period.

== Events ==
=== 100 ===
==== By place ====
====== Roman Empire ======
- Emperor Trajan and Frontinus become Roman consuls.
- Bricks become the primary building material in the Roman Empire.
- Pliny the Younger advances to consulship, giving his panegyric on Trajan in the process.
- The Imperial Roman army reaches 300,000 soldiers.
- Titus Avidius Quietus' rule as governor of Roman Britain ends.
- Timgad (Thamugas), a Roman colonial town in North Africa, is founded by Trajan.
- Trajan creates a policy intended to restore the former economic supremacy of Italy.
- The future emperor, Hadrian, marries Vibia Sabina.

====== Europe ======
- Lions have become extinct in Greece by this year.

====== Asia ======
- Pacores (last king of the Indo-Parthian kingdom) takes the throne.
- Paper is used by the general populace in China, starting around this year.

====== Americas ======
- The Hopewell tradition roughly begins in what is now Ohio.
- Teotihuacan, a major city at the centre of modern-day Mexico, reaches a population of around 60,000–80,000.
- The Moche culture emerges, and starts building a society in present-day Peru.

==== By topic ====
====== Arts and sciences ======
- In China, the wheelbarrow makes its first appearance.
- Main hall, Trajan's Market, Rome, is made (until AD 112).

====== Religion ======
- Appearance of the first Christian dogma and formulas regarding morality.
- The Gospel of John is widely believed to have been written around this date.
- The compilation of the Kama Sutra begins in India.
- The Temple of the God of Medicine is built in Anguo, China.
- The Fourth Buddhist Council is convened in Jalandhara, Punjab.

=== 101 ===
==== By place ====
====== Roman Empire ======
- Trajan begins his fourth consulship.
- Emperor Trajan starts an expedition against Dacia, exceeding the limits of the Roman Empire set by Augustus.
- Third Battle of Tapae: Roman forces, led by Trajan, defeat the Dacian king Decebalus in Transylvania.

==== By topic ====
====== Literature ======
- Epictetus writes and publishes The Discourses of Epictetus (approximate date).

=== 102 ===
==== By place ====
====== Roman Empire ======
- Lucius Julius Ursus Servianus and Lucius Licinius Sura become Roman consuls.
- Emperor Trajan returns to Rome after a successful campaign against Dacia, through which he reestablishes clear Roman sovereignty over King Decebalus.
- Trajan divides Pannonia into two provinces, sometime between this year and 107.
- The port of Portus is enlarged.
- Planning and surveying for the port of Ostia is undertaken.

====== Asia ======
- Having organised the territories of the Tarim Basin, Chinese General Ban Chao retires to Luoyang and dies shortly thereafter.

=== 103 ===
==== By place ====
====== Roman Empire ======
- Emperor Trajan and Manius Laberius Maximus become Roman consuls.
- Pliny the Younger becomes a member of the college of Augurs (103–104).
- Legio X Gemina moves to Vienna, where it remains until the 5th century.

==== By topic ====
====== Religion ======
- In Palmyra, Syria, a Temple of the Sun is erected to the god Baal.

=== 104 ===
==== By place ====
====== Roman Empire ======
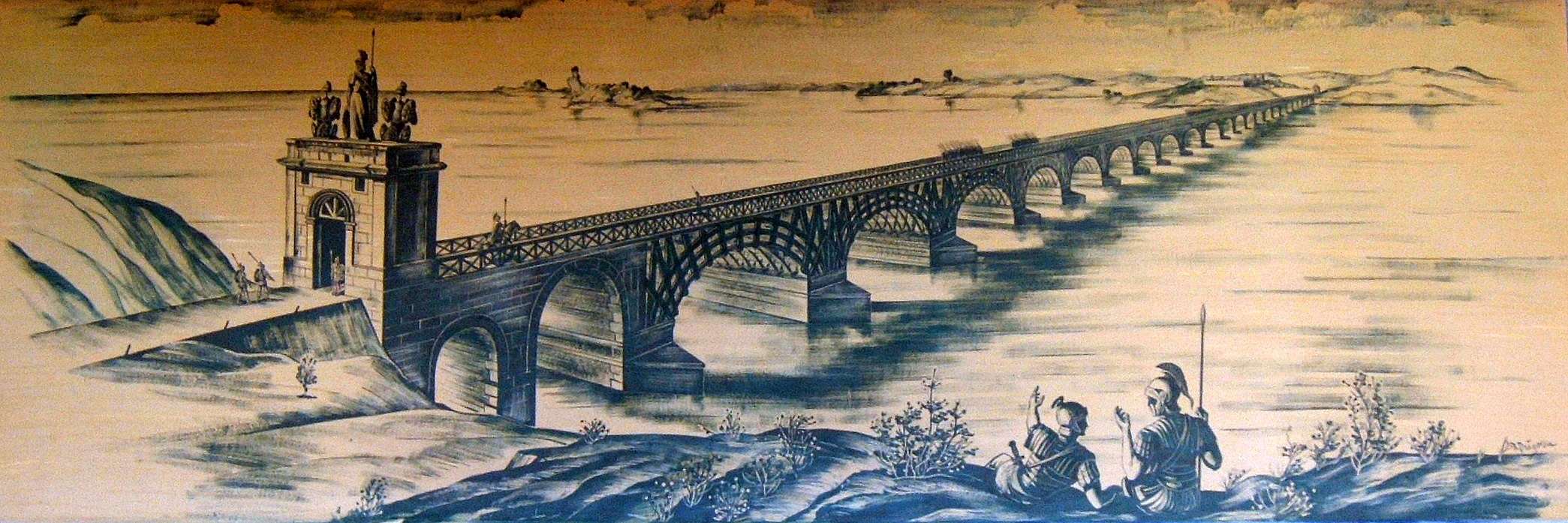
The Trajan's Bridge across the lower Danube, as seen from Drobeta. Reconstruction by the engineer E. Duperrex in 1907

- Pliny the Younger continues as a member of the College of Augurs (103–104).
- Nijmegen is renamed Ulpia Noviomagus Batavorum.
- A fire breaks out in Rome.
- Trajan gives the order to have the Alcántara Bridge, constructed by the architect Lacer, built over the Tagus River at Alcántara (Hispania).
- Apollodorus of Damascus builds a stone bridge over the Danube more than 1,000 meters (3,300 feet) long, almost 20 meters (66 feet) high and 15 meters (49 feet) wide. The bridge connects what is now Serbia with Romania (at the time known as Dacia).

==== By topic ====
====== Religion ======
- In India, figures of Buddha replace abstract motifs on decorative items.

=== 105 ===
==== By place ====
====== Roman Empire ======
- Emperor Trajan starts the second expedition against Dacia; he leaves with the Imperial Roman fleet from Brundusium.
- Permanent castrum of Legio II Adiutrix at Aquincum (modern Budapest) in Pannonia.
- Legio XXX Ulpia Victrix and II Traiana Fortis are created by Trajan.
- The Romans conquer Kerak from the Nabateans.
- Pacorus II of Parthia dies after a 27-year reign, in which he has reclaimed all of his empire. His successor Vologases III reigns until 147 AD, suppressing brief rebellions, as he battles against the Kushan and Alani.

====== Asia ======
- Emperor He Di dies after a 17-year reign in which court eunuchs and the emperor's in-laws have regained influence. Empress Deng Sui places her son Shang Di (barely 3 months old) on the throne, as the fifth emperor of the Chinese Eastern Han dynasty.
- Last year (17th) of yongyuan era and start of yuanxing era of the Chinese Eastern Han dynasty.
- A peace treaty is signed between Baekje and Silla in the Korean peninsula (the war started in AD 85).

==== By topic ====
====== Art and Science ======
- Papermaking is refined by the Chinese eunuch Cai Lun, who receives official praise from the emperor for his methods of making paper from tree bark, hemp, remnant rags, and fish nets. Occasionally, skin from cadavers were also spread as a final layer. Paper had been made in China from the 2nd century BC, but Cai Lun's paper provides a writing surface far superior to pure silk and is much less costly to produce. Bamboo and wooden slips will remain the usual materials for books and scrolls in most of the world for another 200 years, and paper will remain a Chinese secret for 500 years.
- The Trajan Bridge is finished. For more than a thousand years, it is the longest arch bridge in the world to have been built, in terms of both total and span length.

====== Religion ======
- Pope Alexander I succeeds Pope Evaristus as the sixth pope according to Roman Catholic tradition (approximate date).
- Change of Patriarch of Constantinople from Patriarch Plutarch to Patriarch Sedecion.

=== 106 ===
==== By place ====
====== Roman Empire ======
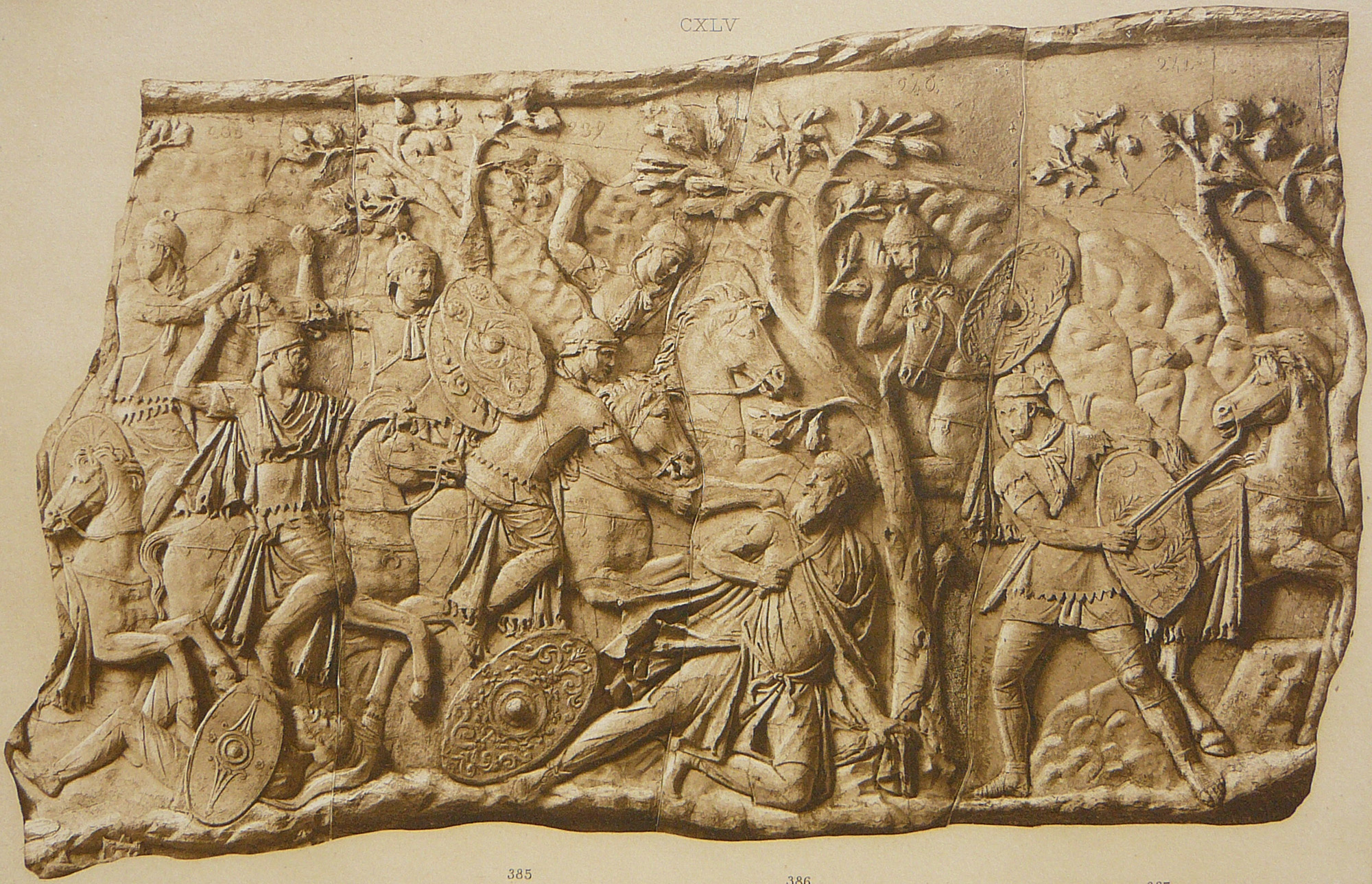
Decebalus' suicidal death, from Trajan's Column

- Ignatius writes a letter to Christians in Smyrna, using the term Catholic Church (approximate date). This is the earliest surviving witness to the use of the term "Catholic Church".
- Emperor Trajan conquers the Dacian Fortresses of the Orăştie Mountains, and surrounds the capital, Sarmizegetusa.
- Battle of Sarmizegetusa: The Dacians are defeated with 50,000 captured. King Decebalus flees and commits suicide.
- August 11 – The south-eastern part of Dacia (modern Romania) becomes a Roman province: Roman Dacia. The veterans of the legions are given land in the new province for their service in the Roman army.
- Trajan annexes the Nabataean Kingdom (with its capital Petra) as the Roman province of Arabia Petraea. The epoch of the calendar of the province of Arabia begins on March 22.
- Romans construct a road between Eilat and Damascus.

====== China ======
- February 13 – Emperor He of Han dies after a 18-year reign. Empress Dowager Deng places her infant son Han Shangdi on the Chinese throne. First and the only year of yanping era.
- September 21 – Han Shangdi dies after a 7-month reign and is succeeded by his 12-year-old cousin Han Andi as ruler of the Chinese Eastern Han dynasty (until 125).

==== By topic ====
====== Literature ======
- Aelianus Tacticus (or Aelian) writes his Taktike Theoria (approximate date).

=== 107 ===
==== By place ====
====== Roman Empire ======
- Lucius Licinius Sura and Quintus Sosius Senecio become consuls of Rome.
- An Indian ambassador is received by Emperor Trajan.

====== Asia ======
- First year of the yongchu era of the Chinese Eastern Han Dynasty.
- Han Andi (An-ti) becomes emperor of China.

=== 108 ===
==== By place ====
====== Roman Empire ======
- Appius Annius Trebonius Gallus and Marcus Atilius Bradua become Roman Consuls.

==== By topic ====
====== Arts and sciences ======
- Tacitus writes Histories, which covers the period from AD 69 to AD 96.
- The Hypogeum of Yarhai, an underground tomb from the Syrian city of Palmyra dedicated to the family of Yarhai, is built.

=== 109 ===
==== By place ====
====== Roman Empire ======
- June 24 – The Aqua Traiana is inaugurated by Emperor Trajan; the aqueduct channels water from Lake Bracciano, 40 kilometers (25 mi) northwest of Rome.
- The Via Traiana is constructed at the Emperor Trajan's personal expense; the road connects Benevento with Brundisium (Brindisi).
- The Baths of Trajan, built by the architect Apollodorus of Damascus, are dedicated during the Calends. The thermae are constructed on the platform of the Palace of Nero (Domus Aurea) in Rome.
- Pliny the Younger is legate to Bithynia.

====== Parthian Empire ======
- Osroes I of Parthia succeeds his brother Pacorus II, and rules over the western Parthian Empire.

==== By topic ====
====== Religion ======
- The Christian Church proclaims itself to be universal (catholic).

== Significant people ==
- Trajan, Roman Emperor (AD 98–117)

== Births ==
AD 100

- Fa Zhen (or Gaoqing), Chinese scholar (d. 188)
- Approximate date
  - Faustina the Elder, Roman empress (d. 140)
  - Justin Martyr, Christian apologist and saint (d. 165)
  - Marcus Cornelius Fronto, Roman grammarian, rhetorician and advocate (d. 170)
  - Ptolemy, Greek astrologer, astronomer, geographer and mathematician (d. 170)
  - Quintus Junius Rusticus, Roman teacher and politician (d. 170)
  - Quintus Tineius Sacerdos Clemens, Roman politician (d. 170)

101

- January 13 – Lucius Aelius Caesar, Roman politician (d. 138)
- Felicitas of Rome, Christian female martyr (d. 165)
- Herodes Atticus, Greek rhetoritician (d. 177)

103

- Kong Zhou, father of Kong Rong (d. 163)

104

- Chen Shi, Chinese politician and official (d. 187)
- Gaius Appuleius Diocles, Roman charioteer

105

- Alexander of Abonoteichus, Greek mystic and oracle (d. 170)
- Han Shangdi, Chinese emperor of the Han dynasty (d. 106)
- Marcus Sedatius Severianus, Roman politician (d. 161)

== Deaths ==
AD 100

- Herod Agrippa II, Jewish king of Judea (b. AD 27)
- Apollonius of Tyana, Greek philosopher (b. AD 15)
- Josephus, Jewish historian and writer (b. AD 37)
- John the Apostle of Jesus Christ (approximate date, b. AD 6)
- Wang Chong, Chinese philosopher (b. AD 27)

101

- Clement I, bishop of Rome (epistle to the Corinthians) (or 102 according to Roman Catholic tradition)
- Gan Ying, Chinese ambassador of the Han dynasty
- Jia Kui, Chinese scholar and philosopher (b. AD 30)
- Silius Italicus, Roman politician and author of the Punica (annals of Hannibal during the Second Punic War) (b. c. AD 28)

102

- Ban Chao, Chinese general of the Han dynasty (b. AD 32)
- Clement I, bishop of Rome (approximate date according to Roman Catholic tradition)
- Yin, Chinese empress of the Han dynasty

103

- Kanishka I, ruler of the Kushan Empire (approximate date)
- Sextus Julius Frontinus, Roman author (b. c. AD 40)
- Martial, poet and satirist
- Silius Italicus, Roman politician and author (b. c. AD 28)
- Yin, Chinese empress of the Han Dynasty (b. AD 80)

105

- June 24 – Gnaeus Afranius Dexter, Roman politician
- Gnaeus Pompeius Longinus, Roman politician
- Marcus Valerius Probus, Roman grammarian
- Pacorus II, king of the Parthian Empire
- Plutarch, bishop of Byzantium

106

- February 13 – He of Han, Chinese emperor of the Han dynasty (b. AD 79)
- September 21 – Han Shangdi, Chinese emperor of the Han dynasty (b. 105)
- Decebalus, king of Dacia (suicide, being pursued by the Romans) (b. AD 87)
- Liu Qing, Chinese prince of the Han dynasty (b. AD 78)
- Rabbel II Soter, ruler of the Nabataean Kingdom

107

- Titus Avidius Quietus, Roman politician and governor
- Ignatius of Antioch (possible date)

108

- Hyacinth of Caesarea, Christian martyr
