= AD 106 =

106 in various calendars
- Gregorian calendar: 106; CVI
- Ab urbe condita: 859
- Assyrian calendar: 4856
- Balinese saka calendar: 27–28
- Bengali calendar: −488 – −487
- Berber calendar: 1056
- Buddhist calendar: 650
- Burmese calendar: −532
- Byzantine calendar: 5614–5615
- Chinese calendar: 乙巳年 (Wood Snake); 2803 or 2596 — to — 丙午年 (Fire Horse); 2804 or 2597
- Coptic calendar: −178 – −177
- Discordian calendar: 1272
- Ethiopian calendar: 98–99
- Hebrew calendar: 3866–3867
- Hindu calendars
- Vikram Samvat: 162–163
- Shaka Samvat: 27–28
- Kali Yuga: 3206–3207
- Holocene calendar: 10106
- Iranian calendar: 516 BP – 515 BP
- Islamic calendar: 532 BH – 531 BH
- Javanese calendar: N/A
- Julian calendar: 106; CVI
- Korean calendar: 2439
- Minguo calendar: 1806 before ROC 民前1806年
- Nanakshahi calendar: −1362
- Seleucid era: 417/418 AG
- Thai solar calendar: 648–649
- Tibetan calendar: ཤིང་མོ་སྦྲུལ་ལོ་ (female Wood-Snake); 232 or −149 or −921 — to — མེ་ཕོ་རྟ་ལོ་ (male Fire-Horse); 233 or −148 or −920

Year 106 (CVI) was a common year starting on Thursday of the Julian calendar. At the time, it was known as the Year of the Consulship of Commodus and Civica (or, less frequently, year 859 Ab urbe condita). The denomination 106 for this year has been used since the early medieval period, when the Anno Domini calendar era became the prevalent method in Europe for naming years.

== Events ==
=== By place ===
==== Roman Empire ====
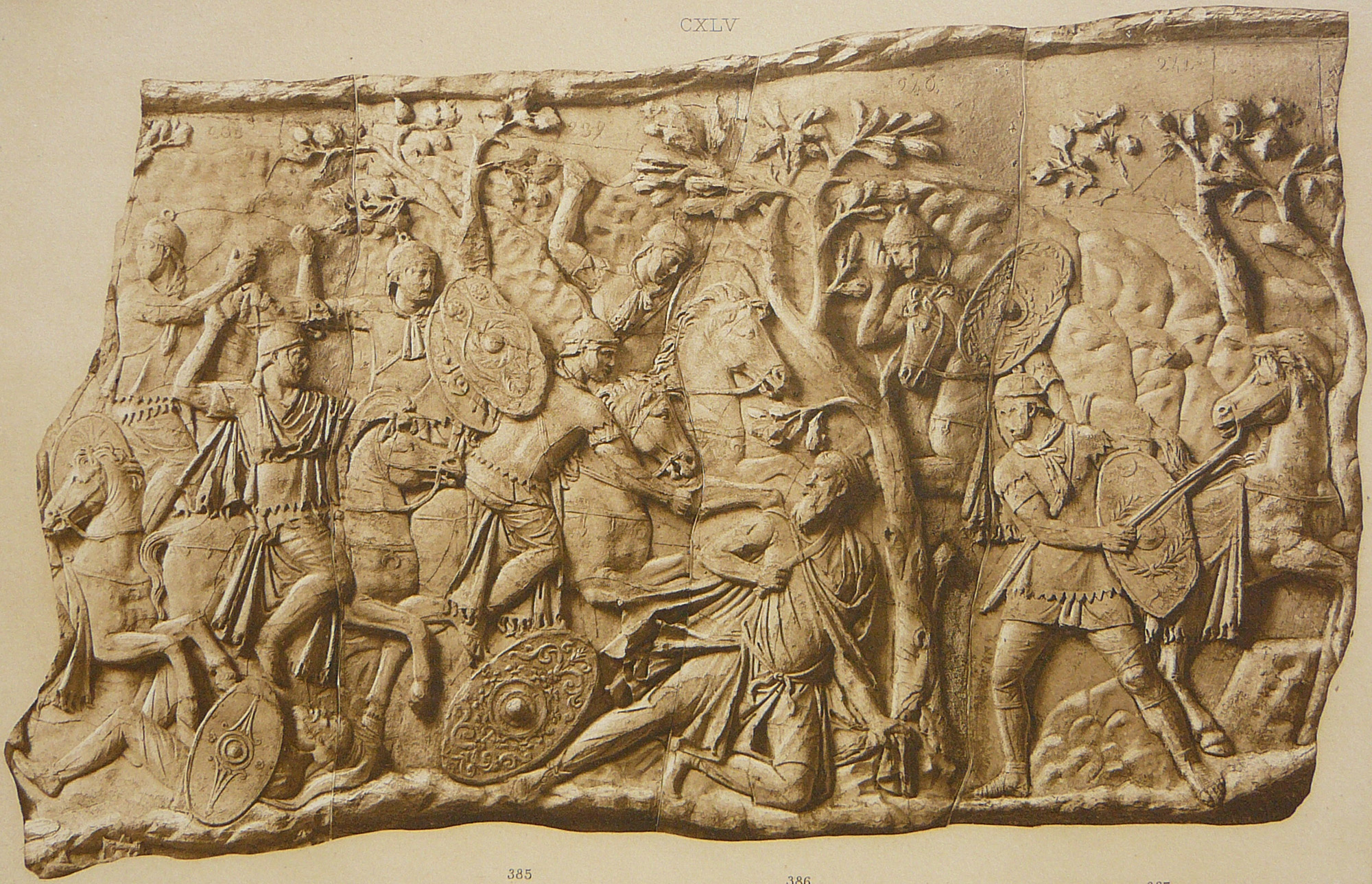
Decebalus' suicidal death, from Trajan's Column

- Ignatius writes a letter to Christians in Smyrna, using the term Catholic Church (approximate date). This is the earliest surviving witness to the use of the term "Catholic Church".
- Emperor Trajan conquers the Dacian Fortresses of the Orăştie Mountains, and surrounds the capital, Sarmizegetusa.
- Battle of Sarmizegetusa: The Dacians are defeated with 50,000 captured. King Decebalus flees and commits suicide.
- August 11 – The south-eastern part of Dacia (modern Romania) becomes a Roman province: Roman Dacia. The veterans of the legions are given land in the new province for their service in the Roman army.
- Trajan annexes the Nabataean Kingdom (with its capital Petra) as the Roman province of Arabia Petraea. The epoch of the calendar of the province of Arabia begins on March 22.
- Romans construct a road between Eilat and Damascus.

==== China ====
- February 13 – Emperor He of Han dies after an 18-year reign. Empress Dowager Deng places her infant son Han Shangdi on the Chinese throne. First and the only year of yanping era.
- September 21 – Han Shangdi dies after a 7-month reign and is succeeded by his 12-year-old cousin Han Andi as ruler of the Chinese Eastern Han dynasty (until 125).

=== By topic ===
==== Literature ====
- Aelianus Tacticus (or Aelian) writes his Taktike Theoria (approximate date).

== Deaths ==
- February 13 – He of Han, Chinese emperor of the Han dynasty (b. AD 79)
- September 21 – Han Shangdi, Chinese emperor of the Han dynasty (b. 105)
- Decebalus, king of Dacia (suicide, being pursued by the Romans) (b. AD 87)
- Liu Qing, Chinese prince of the Han dynasty (b. AD 78)
- Rabbel II Soter, ruler of the Nabataean Kingdom
