= AD 163 =

163 in various calendars
- Gregorian calendar: 163; CLXIII
- Ab urbe condita: 916
- Assyrian calendar: 4913
- Balinese saka calendar: 84–85
- Bengali calendar: −431 – −430
- Berber calendar: 1113
- Buddhist calendar: 707
- Burmese calendar: −475
- Byzantine calendar: 5671–5672
- Chinese calendar: 壬寅年 (Water Tiger); 2860 or 2653 — to — 癸卯年 (Water Rabbit); 2861 or 2654
- Coptic calendar: −121 – −120
- Discordian calendar: 1329
- Ethiopian calendar: 155–156
- Hebrew calendar: 3923–3924
- Hindu calendars
- Vikram Samvat: 219–220
- Shaka Samvat: 84–85
- Kali Yuga: 3263–3264
- Holocene calendar: 10163
- Iranian calendar: 459 BP – 458 BP
- Islamic calendar: 473 BH – 472 BH
- Javanese calendar: 39–40
- Julian calendar: 163; CLXIII
- Korean calendar: 2496
- Minguo calendar: 1749 before ROC 民前1749年
- Nanakshahi calendar: −1305
- Seleucid era: 474/475 AG
- Thai solar calendar: 705–706
- Tibetan calendar: ཆུ་ཕོ་སྟག་ལོ་ (male Water-Tiger); 289 or −92 or −864 — to — ཆུ་མོ་ཡོས་ལོ་ (female Water-Hare); 290 or −91 or −863

Year 163 (CLXIII) was a common year starting on Friday of the Julian calendar. At the time, it was known as the Year of the Consulship of Laelianus and Pastor (or, less frequently, year 916 Ab urbe condita). The denomination 163 for this year has been used since the early medieval period, when the Anno Domini calendar era became the prevalent method in Europe for naming years.

== Events ==
=== By place ===
==== Roman Empire ====
- Marcus Statius Priscus re-conquers Armenia; the capital city of Artaxata is ruined.

== Births ==
- Cui Yan (or Jigui), Chinese official and politician (d. 216)
- Sun Shao (or Changxu), Chinese chancellor (d. 225)
- Tiberius Claudius Severus Proculus, Roman politician
- Xun Yu, Chinese politician and adviser (d. 212)

== Deaths ==
- Kong Zhou, father of Kong Rong (b. 103)
- Marcus Annius Libo, Roman politician
