= AD 103 =

103 in various calendars
Gregorian calendar	103; CIII
Ab urbe condita	856
Assyrian calendar	4853
Balinese saka calendar	24–25
Bengali calendar	−491 – −490
Berber calendar	1053
Buddhist calendar	647
Burmese calendar	−535
Byzantine calendar	5611–5612
Chinese calendar	壬寅年 (Water Tiger); 2800 or 2593 — to — 癸卯年 (Water Rabbit); 2801 or 2594
Coptic calendar	−181 – −180
Discordian calendar	1269
Ethiopian calendar	95–96
Hebrew calendar	3863–3864
- Hindu calendars
Vikram Samvat	159–160
Shaka Samvat	24–25
Kali Yuga	3203–3204
Holocene calendar	10103
Iranian calendar	519 BP – 518 BP
Islamic calendar	535 BH – 534 BH
Javanese calendar	N/A
Julian calendar	103; CIII
Korean calendar	2436
Minguo calendar	1809 before ROC 民前1809年
Nanakshahi calendar	−1365
Seleucid era	414/415 AG
Thai solar calendar	645–646
Tibetan calendar	ཆུ་ཕོ་སྟག་ལོ་ (male Water-Tiger); 229 or −152 or −924 — to — ཆུ་མོ་ཡོས་ལོ་ (female Water-Hare); 230 or −151 or −923

103 (CIII) was a common year starting on Sunday of the Julian calendar. At the time, it was known as the Year of the Consulship of Traianus and Maximus (or, less frequently, year 856 Ab urbe condita). The denomination 103 for this year has been used since the early medieval period, when the Anno Domini calendar era became the prevalent method in Europe for naming years.

== Events ==
=== By place ===
==== Roman Empire ====
- Emperor Trajan and Manius Laberius Maximus become Roman consuls.
- Pliny the Younger becomes a member of the college of Augurs (103–104).
- Legio X Gemina moves to Vienna, where it remains until the 5th century.

=== By topic ===
==== Religion ====
- In Palmyra, Syria, a Temple of the Sun is erected to the god Baal.

== Births ==
- Kong Zhou, father of Kong Rong (d. 163)

== Deaths ==
- Kanishka I, ruler of the Kushan Empire (approximate date)
- Sextus Julius Frontinus, Roman author (b. c. AD 40)
- Martial, poet and satirist
- Silius Italicus, Roman politician and author (b. c. AD 28)
- Yin, Chinese empress of the Han Dynasty (b. AD 80)
