= AD 102 =

102 in various calendars
- Gregorian calendar: 102; CII
- Ab urbe condita: 855
- Assyrian calendar: 4852
- Balinese saka calendar: 23–24
- Bengali calendar: −492 – −491
- Berber calendar: 1052
- Buddhist calendar: 646
- Burmese calendar: −536
- Byzantine calendar: 5610–5611
- Chinese calendar: 辛丑年 (Metal Ox); 2799 or 2592 — to — 壬寅年 (Water Tiger); 2800 or 2593
- Coptic calendar: −182 – −181
- Discordian calendar: 1268
- Ethiopian calendar: 94–95
- Hebrew calendar: 3862–3863
- Hindu calendars
- Vikram Samvat: 158–159
- Shaka Samvat: 23–24
- Kali Yuga: 3202–3203
- Holocene calendar: 10102
- Iranian calendar: 520 BP – 519 BP
- Islamic calendar: 536 BH – 535 BH
- Javanese calendar: N/A
- Julian calendar: 102; CII
- Korean calendar: 2435
- Minguo calendar: 1810 before ROC 民前1810年
- Nanakshahi calendar: −1366
- Seleucid era: 413/414 AG
- Thai solar calendar: 644–645
- Tibetan calendar: ལྕགས་མོ་གླང་ལོ་ (female Iron-Ox); 228 or −153 or −925 — to — ཆུ་ཕོ་སྟག་ལོ་ (male Water-Tiger); 229 or −152 or −924

Year 102 (CII) was a common year starting on Saturday of the Julian calendar. At the time, it was known as the Year of the Consulship of Ursus and Sura (or, less frequently, year 855 Ab urbe condita). The denomination 102 for this year has been used since the early medieval period, when the Anno Domini calendar era became the prevalent method in Europe for naming years.

== Events ==
=== By place ===
==== Roman Empire ====
- Lucius Julius Ursus Servianus and Lucius Licinius Sura become Roman consuls.
- Emperor Trajan returns to Rome after a successful campaign against Dacia, through which he reestablishes clear Roman sovereignty over King Decebalus.
- Trajan divides Pannonia into two provinces, sometime between this year and 107.
- The port of Portus is enlarged.
- Planning and surveying for the port of Ostia is undertaken.

==== Asia ====
- Having organised the territories of the Tarim Basin, Chinese General Ban Chao retires to Luoyang and dies shortly thereafter.

== Deaths ==
- Ban Chao, Chinese general of the Han dynasty (b. AD 32)
- Clement I, bishop of Rome (approximate date according to Roman Catholic tradition)
- Yin, Chinese empress of the Han dynasty
