= Wang Sheng =

Wang Sheng may refer to:

- Wang Sheng (Han dynasty) (fl. 94–125), wet nurse of Emperor An of Han
- Wang Sheng (general) (1915–2006), Kuomintang general and political figure
- Wang Sheng (footballer) (born 1981), Chinese footballer
