= Emperor An =

Emperor An (安帝) is the posthumous name of several Chinese emperors. It may refer to:

- Emperor An of Han (r. 106–125)
- Emperor An of Jin (382–419) (r. 396–403, 404–418)
