= Yongchu =

Yongchu may refer to:

- Yeongju, a city in North Gyeongsang, South Korea

== Historical eras ==
- Yongchu (107–113), era name used by Emperor An of Han
- Yongchu (420–422), era name used by Emperor Wu of Liu Song
