= Empress Xiaode =

Empress Xiaode (Chinese: 孝德皇后) may refer to:

- Zuo Xiao'e (fl. 1st century), mother of Emperor An of Han
- Empress Xiaodexian (1831–1850), wife of the Xianfeng Emperor before he took the throne
