= Liu Long =

Liu Long may refer to:

- Liu Long (Yuanbo) (劉隆; died 57), style name Yuanbo (元伯), Eastern Han dynasty general, see Book of the Later Han
- Emperor Shang of Han (105–106), name Liu Long (劉隆), Eastern Han dynasty emperor
