= 225 =

225 in various calendars
- Gregorian calendar: 225; CCXXV
- Ab urbe condita: 978
- Assyrian calendar: 4975
- Balinese saka calendar: 146–147
- Bengali calendar: −369 – −368
- Berber calendar: 1175
- Buddhist calendar: 769
- Burmese calendar: −413
- Byzantine calendar: 5733–5734
- Chinese calendar: 甲辰年 (Wood Dragon); 2922 or 2715 — to — 乙巳年 (Wood Snake); 2923 or 2716
- Coptic calendar: −59 – −58
- Discordian calendar: 1391
- Ethiopian calendar: 217–218
- Hebrew calendar: 3985–3986
- Hindu calendars
- Vikram Samvat: 281–282
- Shaka Samvat: 146–147
- Kali Yuga: 3325–3326
- Holocene calendar: 10225
- Iranian calendar: 397 BP – 396 BP
- Islamic calendar: 409 BH – 408 BH
- Javanese calendar: 103–104
- Julian calendar: 225; CCXXV
- Korean calendar: 2558
- Minguo calendar: 1687 before ROC 民前1687年
- Nanakshahi calendar: −1243
- Seleucid era: 536/537 AG
- Thai solar calendar: 767–768
- Tibetan calendar: ཤིང་ཕོ་འབྲུག་ལོ་ (male Wood-Dragon); 351 or −30 or −802 — to — ཤིང་མོ་སྦྲུལ་ལོ་ (female Wood-Snake); 352 or −29 or −801

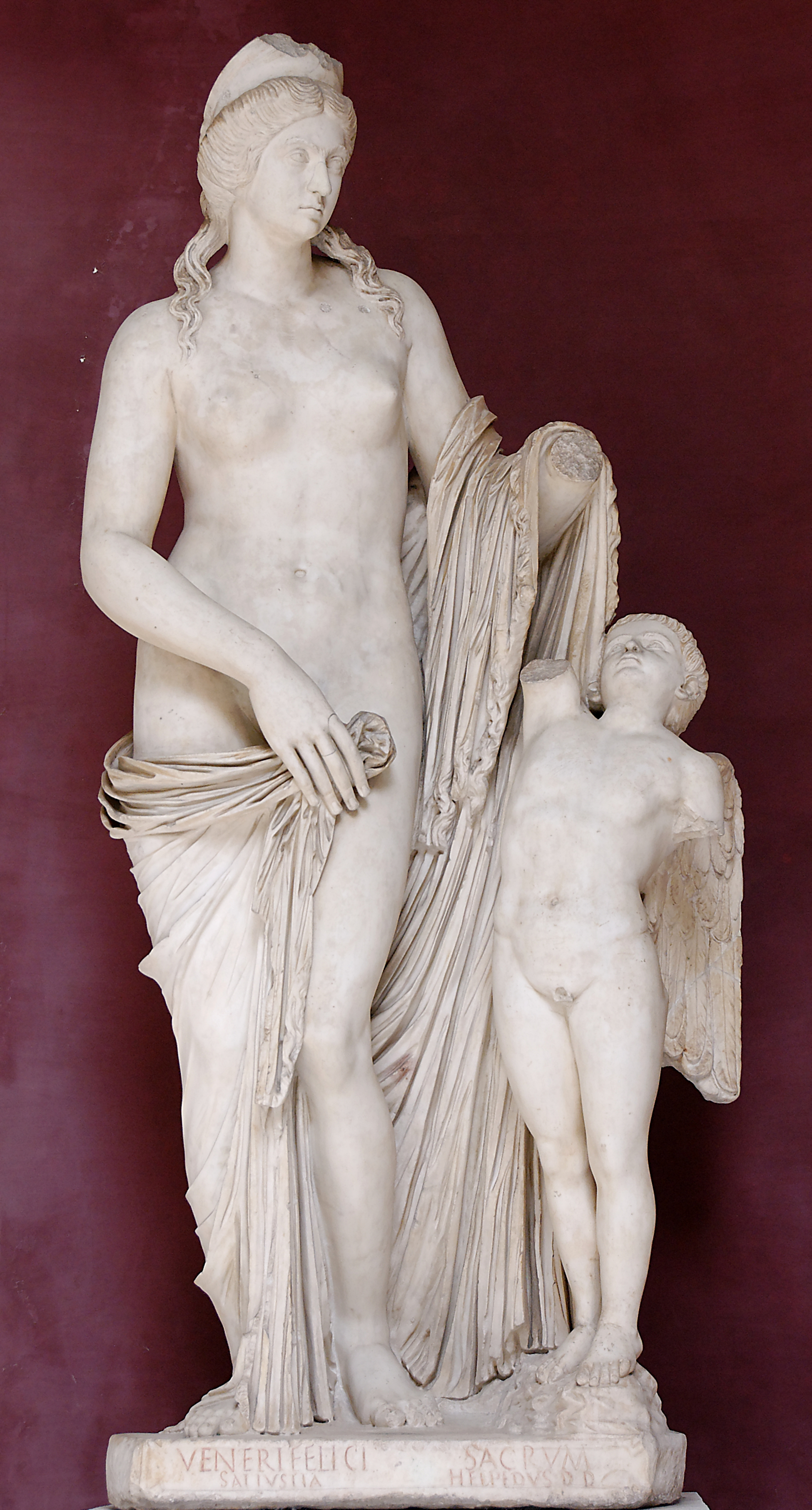
Empress Sallustia Orbiana

Year 225 (CCXXV) was a common year starting on Saturday of the Julian calendar. At the time, it was known as the Year of the Consulship of Fuscus and Domitius (or, less frequently, year 978 Ab urbe condita). The denomination 225 for this year has been used since the early medieval period when the Anno Domini calendar era became the prevalent method in Europe for naming years.

== Events ==
=== By place ===
==== Roman Empire ====
- Emperor Alexander Severus marries Sallustia Orbiana, and possibly raises her father Seius Sallustius to the rank of Caesar.

=== By topic ===
==== Art and Science ====
- The first Christian paintings appear in Rome, decorating the Catacombs.

== Births ==
- January 20 – Gordian III, Roman emperor (d. 244)
- December 26 – Lawrence, Christian martyr (d. 258)
- Trieu Thi Trinh, Vietnamese female warrior (d. 248)
- Zhong Hui, Chinese general and politician (d. 264)

== Deaths ==
- Gaius Vettius Gratus Sabinianus, Roman consul
- Gong Lu, Chinese official and politician (b. 195)
- Sun Shao, Chinese official and chancellor (b. 163)
- Xiahou Shang, Chinese general and politician
