= AD 80 =

AD 80 in various calendars
- Gregorian calendar: AD 80; LXXX
- Ab urbe condita: 833
- Assyrian calendar: 4830
- Balinese saka calendar: 1–2
- Bengali calendar: −514 – −513
- Berber calendar: 1030
- Buddhist calendar: 624
- Burmese calendar: −558
- Byzantine calendar: 5588–5589
- Chinese calendar: 己卯年 (Earth Rabbit); 2777 or 2570 — to — 庚辰年 (Metal Dragon); 2778 or 2571
- Coptic calendar: −204 – −203
- Discordian calendar: 1246
- Ethiopian calendar: 72–73
- Hebrew calendar: 3840–3841
- Hindu calendars
- Vikram Samvat: 136–137
- Shaka Samvat: 1–2
- Kali Yuga: 3180–3181
- Holocene calendar: 10080
- Iranian calendar: 542 BP – 541 BP
- Islamic calendar: 559 BH – 558 BH
- Javanese calendar: N/A
- Julian calendar: AD 80; LXXX
- Korean calendar: 2413
- Minguo calendar: 1832 before ROC 民前1832年
- Nanakshahi calendar: −1388
- Seleucid era: 391/392 AG
- Thai solar calendar: 622–623
- Tibetan calendar: ས་མོ་ཡོས་ལོ་ (female Earth-Hare); 206 or −175 or −947 — to — ལྕགས་ཕོ་འབྲུག་ལོ་ (male Iron-Dragon); 207 or −174 or −946

Aeolipile

AD 80 (LXXX) was a leap year starting on Saturday of the Julian calendar. At the time, it was known as the Year of the Consulship of Augustus and Domitianus (or, less frequently, year 833 Ab urbe condita). The denomination AD 80 for this year has been used since the early medieval period, when the Anno Domini calendar era became the prevalent method in Europe for naming years.

== Events ==
=== By place ===
==== Roman Empire ====
- An epidemic afflicts Rome.
- Martial publishes the Liber Spectaculorum.

==== Asia ====
- King Pasa becomes ruler of the Korean kingdom of Silla.

== Births ==
- Aspasius, Greek philosopher and writer (approximate date)
- Aśvaghoṣa, Indian philosopher and poet (d. c. 150)
- Yin, Chinese empress of the Han dynasty (d. 103)

== Deaths ==
- Kujula Kadphises, Kushan prince (approximate date)
- Lucius Vipstanus Messalla, Roman politician
- Philip the Apostle, Christian apostle and martyr
- Talhae of Silla, Korean ruler of Silla
- Vologases II, king of the Parthian Empire
- Zhao Xi, Chinese politician (b. AD 4)
