= 40s =

Fifth decade of the first century AD

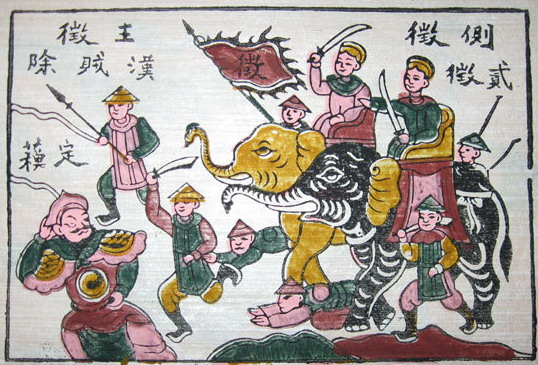
An anachronistic depiction of the Trung sisters' rebellion (40–43 AD)

The 40s ran from January 1, AD 40, to December 31, AD 49. Following the assassination of Caligula, Claudius became Roman emperor in AD 41. In AD 43 he sent Aulus Plautius with four legions across the Channel, initiating the decades-long Roman conquest of Britain.

The Trưng sisters' rebellion broke out in the far south of Han China in AD 40, when Vietnamese leader Trưng Trắc and her sister Trưng Nhị rose against Han authority in Jiaozhi, in what is now northern Vietnam. Han China dispatched General Ma Yuan to suppress the rebellion in AD 42. The Han army had suppressed the uprising by AD 43.

Christianity reached Egypt with the founding of the Church of Alexandria, whose first patriarch was Mark the Evangelist. James the Great, one of the Twelve Apostles and according to the New Testament, the first of them to be martyred, was killed in AD 44. Claudius expelled Jews from Rome at some point between AD 41 and 53. Scholars explain the measure to his concern with public order in Rome rather than a policy directed against Judaism.

A famine struck Judea between AD 44 and 48. Josephus records that Helena of Adiabene provided grain and dried figs to the people of Jerusalem, while her son Izates sent money to the city's leaders.

Literary works of this decade include the Histories of Alexander the Great, written by Quintus Curtius Rufus, and essays by Seneca (including De Ira; Ad Marciam, De Consolatione; De Brevitate Vitae; De Consolatione ad Polybium; and Ad Helviam Matrem, De Consolatione).

== Demographics ==
In the absence of reliable demographic data, estimates of the world population in the 1st century vary widely: figures for AD 1 ranging from 150 to 300 million. Demographers rarely attempt to estimate the population for most specific years in antiquity, instead giving approximate numbers for round years such as AD 1 or AD 200. Scott Manning has tentatively put the population in AD 40 at 247 million.

== Timeline ==
=== AD 40 ===
- Philo teaches that all men are born free.
- Emperor Caligula is consul without colleague.
- Caligula starts on a campaign to conquer Britain, which fails miserably. He declares himself victorious regardless.
- Noricum and Mauretania are incorporated into the Roman Empire.
- Caligula reforms the principatus into a Hellenistic Autocracy. He distributes honors carelessly, declares himself a god and orders that all the heads of the Greek deity statues be replaced by his. He also appoints his horse, Incitatus, to the Senate.
- Construction begins on the Pont du Gard aqueduct in Gallia Narbonensis (approximate date).
- Christianity comes to Egypt as a church is founded in Alexandria. Mark the Evangelist founds the Church of Alexandria as the first Patriarch (traditional date).
- An early Christian church is erected at Corinth (most probable date).
- The traditional date of Saint James the Great meeting Our Lady of the Pillar in Spain.
- The Germanic Quadi tribe begins settling in present-day Moravia and Slovakia.
- Vardanes I becomes king of Parthia, opposed by his brother Gotarzes II.
- The Vietnamese Trưng Sisters rebel against the rule of the Chinese Emperor Guang Wu of Han.

=== AD 41 ===
- January 24
  - Caligula, known for his eccentricity and cruel despotism, is assassinated by his disgruntled Praetorian Guards.
  - Claudius succeeds his nephew, Caligula, as emperor.
- January 25 – After a night of negotiation, Claudius is accepted as emperor by the Senate.
- Claudius makes Agrippa king of Judea.
- Messalina, wife of Claudius, persuades Claudius to have Seneca the Younger banished to Corsica on a charge of adultery with Julia Livilla.
- Claudius restores religious freedom to Jews throughout the empire, but prohibits Jews in Rome from proselytising.
- An attack across the Rhine by the Germans is stopped by the Romans.
- Emperor Guang Wu of the Han Dynasty deposes his wife, Guo Shengtong, as empress, and makes his consort Yin Lihua empress in her place.

=== AD 42 ===
- Romans take control of Ceuta, a port city on the North African side of the Strait of Gibraltar.
- The territories of the current Algeria and Morocco become a Roman province.
- Dalmatian legate Lucius Arruntius Camillus Scribonianus revolts, but his troops defect, and his rebellion quickly withers.
- Claudius begins construction of Portus, a harbour bearing a lighthouse on the right bank of the Tiber.
- Suro becomes the first king of Geumgwan Gaya, on the Korean Peninsula.
- The Chinese General Ma Yuan represses the rebellions of the Trưng Sisters in Tonkin.
- January 25 – The Apostle Paul is converted to Christianity (the exact date is not provided in texts, but the Roman Catholic Church chooses to commemorate this date).
- Traditional date of foundation of the Coptic Orthodox Church of Alexandria by the apostle Mark the Evangelist.

=== AD 43 ===
- Roman conquest of Britain:
  - May – Aulus Plautius, crossing (probably) from Boulogne (Bononia) in the Classis Britannica, lands with four Roman legions (20,000 men) and a similar number of auxiliaries at Rutupiae (probably modern Richborough) on the east coast of Kent. General (future emperor) Vespasian plays a major role in the defeat of the Britons led by the brothers Caratacus and Togodumnus (leaders of the Catuvellauni) in the 2-day Battle of the Medway (probably at the river near Rochester) and the Romans drive them back to and across the River Thames; Togodumnus dies soon after. Plautius halts at the Thames and sends for the Emperor.
  - September – Emperor Claudius, who arrives with reinforcements including war elephants, leads the march on Camulodunum (modern Colchester). Eleven British kings, probably including those of the Iceni and Brigantes, submit without a fight. Plautius becomes the first Governor of Roman Britain.
  - Vespasian begins to subdue the south-west.
  - The Romans begin to construct forts, such as at Peterborough, and a road that later becomes Ermine Street.
  - The Romans capture a Brythonic settlement at Kent and rename it Durovernum Cantiacorum (modern Canterbury); and establish a Roman fort to guard the crossing of the Kentish River Stour.
  - Roman London (Londinium) is established on the Thames.
- Julia Livia, daughter of Drusus Julius Caesar, is executed at the instigation of Claudius' wife Messalina.
- Claudius annexes Lycia in Asia Minor, combining it with Pamphylia as a Roman province.
- The Romans now have complete control of the Mediterranean Sea.
- Warfare begins between the northern and southern Huns.
- The warrior Trung Sisters commit suicide after their resistance is defeated at Nam Viet.
- Vietnam is designated a province of China.
- King Vardanes I of Parthia forces the city of Seleucia on the Tigris to surrender.
- In Coptic Orthodox Christianity, Mark the Evangelist becomes the first Pope of Alexandria, thus establishing the Christian Church in Africa.
- Pomponius Mela, Roman geographer, writes De situ orbis libri (approximate date).

=== AD 44 ===
- Emperor Claudius returns from his British campaign in triumph, the south-east part of Britannia now held by the Roman Empire, but the war will rage for another decade and a half.
- Boudicca marries Prasutagus, king of the British Celtic tribe the Iceni (doubtful).
- Mauretania becomes a Roman province.
- The Isle of Rhodes returns to the Roman Empire.
- Judaea is controlled by Roman governors.
- (Approximate date, may be as late as 48) A famine takes place in Judea.
- Cuspius Fadus (Roman governor of Judea) suppresses the revolt of Theudas, who is decapitated.
- Minjung becomes ruler of the Korean kingdom of Goguryeo.
- Pomponius Mela writes De situ orbis, a geography of the Earth.

=== AD 45 ===
- Juvavum (modern Salzburg) is awarded the status of a Roman municipium.
- Emperor Claudius expels the Jews from Rome (estimated date, more probably later, 47-49 AD).
- Claudius founds Savaria, today the Hungarian city of Szombathely.
- The Senate holds consultations regarding real estate speculation in Rome.
- Chinese general Ma Yuan conducts an expedition against the Xiongnu and the Xianbei (in Manchuria).
- Paul of Tarsus begins his missionary travels, according to one traditional dating scheme.

=== AD 46 ===
- The settlement at Celje gets municipal rights, and is named municipium Claudia Celeia.
- Dobruja is annexed into Roman Moesia.
- A census shows that there are more than 6,000,000 Roman citizens.
- After the death of its king, Thracia becomes a Roman province.
- Rome and its northeast border are reunited by the Danube Road.
- A large famine occurred across Syria, recorded by Orosius, Suetonius, Tacitus and Josephus, due to bad harvests.
- A drought and an invasion of locusts hit the Mongolian steppes, causing a famine and a revolt at Xiongnu.

=== AD 47 ===
- Claudius revives the censorship and ludi saeculares, and organises the order of the Haruspices, with 60 members.
- Gnaeus Domitius Corbulo is made commander of the Roman army in Germania Inferior. He conquers the Chauci and fights against the Cherusci and Frisians.
- Cauci pirates led by the Roman deserter Gannascus ravage the Gallic coast; Corbulo uses the Rhine fleet against them. The Frisian revolt is suppressed.
- Publius Ostorius Scapula replaces Aulus Plautius as governor of Britain. The south-east of the island is now a Roman province, while certain states on the south coast are ruled as a nominally independent client kingdom by Tiberius Claudius Cogidubnus, whose seat is probably at Fishbourne near Chichester. Ostorius immediately faces incursions from unconquered areas, which he puts down.
- Corbulo orders the construction of the canal Fossa Corbulonis, between the Rhine and Meuse in the Netherlands, which connects the city Forum Hadriani (Voorburg).
- Romans build the Traiectum fortification near the mouth of the Rhine, which will later grow to be the city of Utrecht.
- Claudius founds the city Forum Claudii Vallensium (modern Martigny) in the Alpes Poeninae (Switzerland).
- Ananias becomes high priest in Judaea.
- Paul starts his evangelistic work (first missionary journey), accompanied by Barnabas and Mark (possible date).

=== AD 48 ===
- Emperor Claudius invests Agrippa II with the office of superintendent of the Temple in Jerusalem.
- After the execution of his wife Messalina, Claudius gets senatorial approval to marry his niece, Agrippina the Younger.
- Publius Ostorius Scapula, governor of Britain, announces his intention to disarm all Britons south and east of the Trent and Severn. The Iceni, an independent, allied kingdom within that area, revolt but are defeated. Ostorius then moves against the Deceangli in north Wales, but is forced to abandon the campaign to deal with a revolt among the allied Brigantes.
- Gallic nobles are admitted to the Roman Senate. Claudius grants the rights of citizenship to the Aedui.
- Emperor Guang Wu of Han, restores Chinese domination of Inner Mongolia. The Xiongnu are made confederates and guard the Northern border of the empire.
- The Xiangnu empire dissolves.
- Mobon becomes ruler of the Korean kingdom of Goguryeo.
- Paul of Tarsus through his first mission goes to Cyprus and Asia Minor.
- According to Christian tradition, Martha travels to Avignon.

=== AD 49 ===
- Emperor Claudius marries his niece Agrippina the Younger (approximate date), and most of the real power falls to Agrippina.
- Seneca the Younger becomes Nero's tutor.
- Melankomas is the boxing champion, at the 207th Olympic Games.
- Likely date for the expulsion of the Jews from Rome.
- Nero becomes engaged to Claudia Octavia, daughter of Claudius.
- Agrippina the Younger charges Octavia's first fiancé, Lucius Junius Silanus Torquatus, with incest. He is brought before the Senate, and sentenced to death.
- In Britain, governor Publius Ostorius Scapula founds a colonia for Roman veterans at Camulodunum (Colchester). Verulamium (St Albans) is probably established as a municipium the same year. A legion is stationed on the borders of the Silures of South Wales in preparation for invasion.
- First apostolic council in Jerusalem (approximate date).
- The Apostle Paul begins his second missionary journey with Silas while Barnabas goes to Cyprus with Mark.
- The New Testament book Paul's Epistle to the Galatians is probably written.
- Christianity spreads into Europe, especially at Rome and at Philippi (probable date according to chronology derived from the Acts of the Apostles).

== Significant people ==
- Gaius Caesar Germanicus/Caligula (AD 37–41)
- Claudius, Roman Emperor (AD 41–54)
- Agrippina the Younger, Roman empress and power behind the throne (AD 49–54)
- Paul of Tarsus, Christian evangelist

== Births ==
=== AD 40 ===
- June 13 – Gnaeus Julius Agricola, Roman governor (d. AD 93)
- Claudia Octavia, daughter of Claudius and Messalina (d. AD 62)
- Dio Chrysostom, Greek philosopher and historian (d. c. 115)
- Ma, Chinese empress of the Han dynasty (d. AD 79)
- Pedanius Dioscorides, Greek physician and pharmacologist (d. AD 90)
- Sextus Julius Frontinus, Roman general and military author (d. 103)
- Titus Petronius Secundus, Roman prefect (d. AD 97)

=== AD 41 ===
- February 12 – Tiberius Claudius Caesar Britannicus, son of Claudius (d. AD 55)

=== AD 42 ===
- Herennius Philo, Greek grammarian and writer (d. 141)
- Sixtus I, pope of the Catholic Church (d. 124)

=== AD 43 ===
- Martial, Roman poet (approximate date)

=== AD 45 ===
- Ban Zhao, first female Chinese historian (d. 116)
- Domitilla the Younger, Roman noblewoman (d. AD 66)
- Lucius Julius Ursus Servianus, Roman politician (d. 136)
- Lucius Vipstanus Messalla, Roman orator (approximate date)
- Plutarch, Greek historian and biographer (approximate date)
- Publius Papinius Statius, Roman poet (approximate date)
- Tiberius Julius Celsus Polemaeanus, Roman politician

=== AD 46 ===
- Plutarch, Greek historian and biographer (approximate date)

=== AD 47 ===
- Taejodae, Korean ruler of Goguryeo (d. 165)

=== AD 48 ===
- Cai Lun, Chinese inventor and politician (d. 121)
- Ulpia Marciana, sister of Trajan (d. 112)

== Deaths ==
=== AD 40 ===
- Gnaeus Domitius Ahenobarbus, husband of Agrippina the Younger (b. 17 BC)
- Faustus Cornelius Sulla, Roman politician and suffect consul
- Ptolemy of Mauretania, Roman client king (executed by Caligula)
- Tiberius Julius Abdes Pantera, Roman soldier (hypothesized by numerous scholars to have been the father of Jesus)

=== AD 41 ===
- January 24
  - Caligula, Roman emperor (assassinated) (b. 12 AD)
  - Julia Drusilla, daughter of Caligula (assassinated) (b. 39 AD)
  - Milonia Caesonia, wife of Caligula (assassinated) (b. 6 AD)
- Asprenas Calpurnius Serranus, Roman politician
- Gnaeus Domitius Ahenobarbus, Roman consul (b. 17 BC)
- Julia Livilla, daughter of Germanicus (starved to death) (b. 18 AD)

=== AD 42 ===
- Arria, Roman noblewoman (committed suicide)
- Aulus Caecina Paetus, Roman politician (committed suicide)
- Gaius Appius Junius Silanus, Roman consul (executed)
- Lucius Annius Vinicianus, Roman politician (committed suicide)
- Lucius Arruntius Camillus Scribonianus, Roman politician (committed suicide)

=== AD 43 ===
- Aemilia Lepida, Roman noblewoman, fiancée of Claudius (b. 5 BC)
- Appius Junius Silanus, Roman consul (executed)
- Julia Livia, daughter of Drusus Julius Caesar (executed)
- Togodumnus, king of the Catuvellauni
- Trưng Sisters, Vietnamese military leaders (approximate date)

=== AD 44 ===
- Daemusin, Korean ruler of Goguryeo
- Herod Agrippa I, king of Judea (b. 11 BC)
- James the Great, apostle of Jesus (executed by the order of King Agrippa I)
- Wu Han, general of the Han Dynasty

=== AD 45 ===
- Pomponius Mela, Roman geographer (approximate date)
- Vardanes I, king of the Parthian Empire (approximate date)

=== AD 46 ===
- Marcus Vinicius, Roman consul and governor (b. c. 5 BC)
- Rhoemetalces III, Roman client king of Thrace (murdered)
- Servius Asinius Celer, Roman politician (executed)

=== AD 47 ===
- Decimus Valerius Asiaticus, Roman politician and consul
- Gaius Sallustius Crispus Passienus, Roman consul
- Gnaeus Pompeius Magnus, Roman nobleman
- Quintus Sanquinius Maximus, Roman politician
- Vardanes I, king of the Parthian Empire

=== AD 48 ===
- Gaius Silius, Roman politician (b. AD 13)
- Minjung, Korean ruler of Goguryeo
- Mnester, Roman pantomime actor
- Valeria Messalina, wife of Claudius

=== AD 49 ===
- Lollia Paulina, Roman noblewoman and empress (b. AD 15)
- Ma Yuan, Chinese general of the Han Dynasty(b. 14 BC)
