= AD 187 =

187 in various calendars
- Gregorian calendar: 187; CLXXXVII
- Ab urbe condita: 940
- Assyrian calendar: 4937
- Balinese saka calendar: 108–109
- Bengali calendar: −407 – −406
- Berber calendar: 1137
- Buddhist calendar: 731
- Burmese calendar: −451
- Byzantine calendar: 5695–5696
- Chinese calendar: 丙寅年 (Fire Tiger); 2884 or 2677 — to — 丁卯年 (Fire Rabbit); 2885 or 2678
- Coptic calendar: −97 – −96
- Discordian calendar: 1353
- Ethiopian calendar: 179–180
- Hebrew calendar: 3947–3948
- Hindu calendars
- Vikram Samvat: 243–244
- Shaka Samvat: 108–109
- Kali Yuga: 3287–3288
- Holocene calendar: 10187
- Iranian calendar: 435 BP – 434 BP
- Islamic calendar: 448 BH – 447 BH
- Javanese calendar: 64–65
- Julian calendar: 187; CLXXXVII
- Korean calendar: 2520
- Minguo calendar: 1725 before ROC 民前1725年
- Nanakshahi calendar: −1281
- Seleucid era: 498/499 AG
- Thai solar calendar: 729–730
- Tibetan calendar: མེ་ཕོ་སྟག་ལོ་ (male Fire-Tiger); 313 or −68 or −840 — to — མེ་མོ་ཡོས་ལོ་ (female Fire-Hare); 314 or −67 or −839

Year 187 (CLXXXVII) was a common year starting on Sunday of the Julian calendar. At the time, it was known as the Year of the Consulship of Quintius and Aelianus (or, less frequently, year 940 Ab urbe condita). The denomination 187 for this year has been used since the early medieval period, when the Anno Domini calendar era became the prevalent method in Europe for naming years.

== Events ==
=== By place ===
==== Roman Empire ====
- Septimius Severus marries Julia Domna (age 17), a Syrian princess, at Lugdunum (modern-day Lyon). She is the youngest daughter of high-priest Julius Bassianus – a descendant of the Royal House of Emesa. Her elder sister is Julia Maesa.
- Clodius Albinus defeats the Chatti, a highly organized German tribe that controlled the area that includes the Black Forest.

=== By topic ===
==== Religion ====
- Olympianus succeeds Pertinax as bishop of Byzantium (until 198).

== Births ==
- Cao Pi, Chinese emperor of the Cao Wei state (d. 226)
- Gu Shao, Chinese official and politician (d. 218)

== Deaths ==
- Chen Shi, Chinese official and politician (b. 104)
- Maternus, Gaulish rebel leader (approximate date)
- Pertinax, bishop of Byzantium
