= AD 79 =

AD 79 in various calendars
- Gregorian calendar: AD 79; LXXIX
- Ab urbe condita: 832
- Assyrian calendar: 4829
- Balinese saka calendar: 0–1
- Bengali calendar: −515 – −514
- Berber calendar: 1029
- Buddhist calendar: 623
- Burmese calendar: −559
- Byzantine calendar: 5587–5588
- Chinese calendar: 戊寅年 (Earth Tiger); 2776 or 2569 — to — 己卯年 (Earth Rabbit); 2777 or 2570
- Coptic calendar: −205 – −204
- Discordian calendar: 1245
- Ethiopian calendar: 71–72
- Hebrew calendar: 3839–3840
- Hindu calendars
- Vikram Samvat: 135–136
- Shaka Samvat: 0–1
- Kali Yuga: 3179–3180
- Holocene calendar: 10079
- Iranian calendar: 543 BP – 542 BP
- Islamic calendar: 560 BH – 559 BH
- Javanese calendar: N/A
- Julian calendar: AD 79; LXXIX
- Korean calendar: 2412
- Minguo calendar: 1833 before ROC 民前1833年
- Nanakshahi calendar: −1389
- Seleucid era: 390/391 AG
- Thai solar calendar: 621–622
- Tibetan calendar: ས་ཕོ་སྟག་ལོ་ (male Earth-Tiger); 205 or −176 or −948 — to — ས་མོ་ཡོས་ལོ་ (female Earth-Hare); 206 or −175 or −947

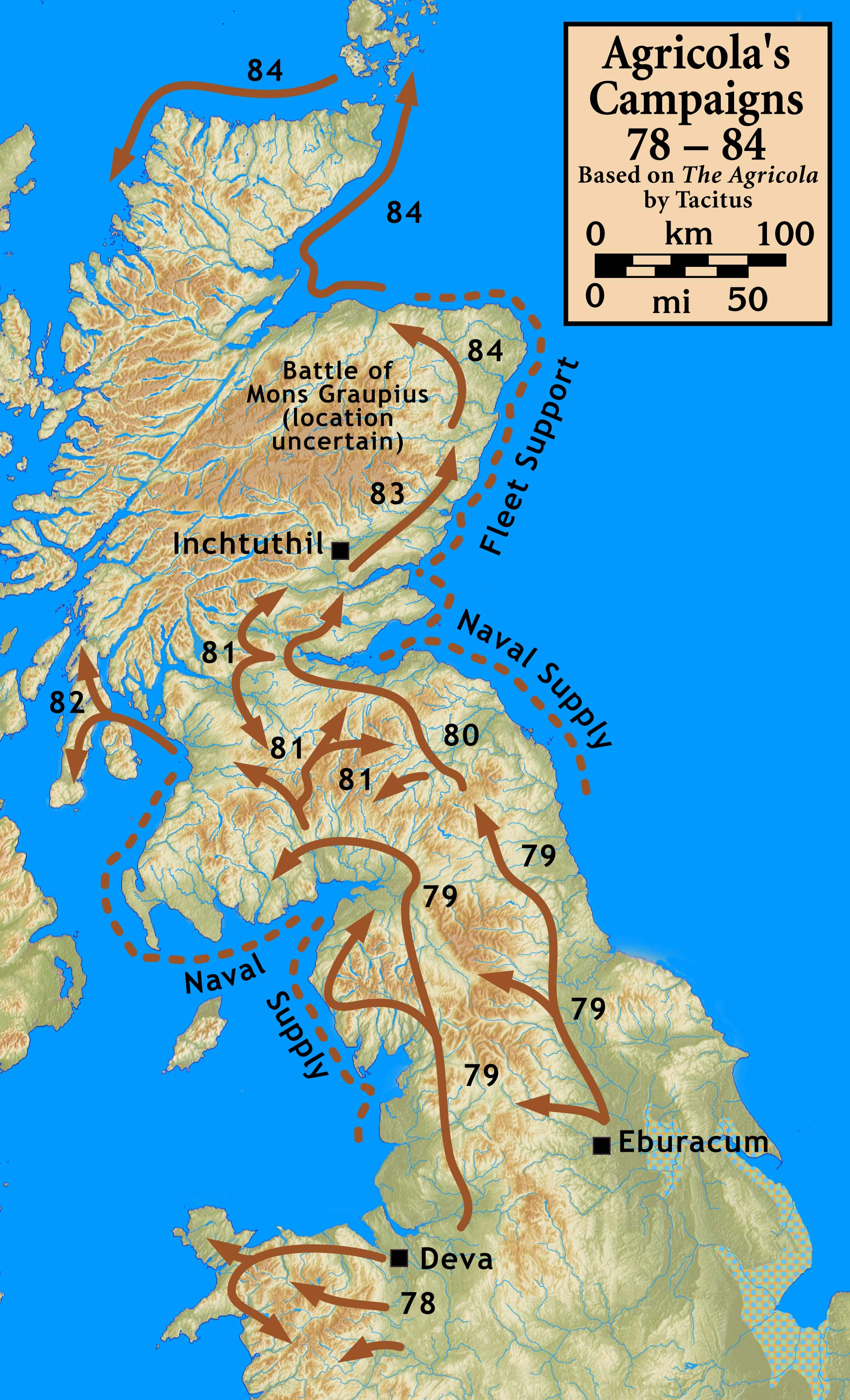
Agricola's Campaigns in Scotland (AD 78–84)

AD 79 (LXXIX) was a common year starting on Friday of the Julian calendar. At the time, it was known as the Year of the Consulship of Titus and Vespasianus (or, less frequently, year 832 Ab urbe condita). The denomination AD 79 for this year has been used since the early medieval period, when the Anno Domini calendar era became the prevalent method in Europe for naming years.

== Events ==
=== By place ===
==== Roman Empire ====
- Vespasianus Augustus and Titus Caesar Vespasianus become Roman Consuls.
- June 23 – Emperor Vespasian dies of fever from diarrhea; his last words on his deathbed are: "I think I'm turning into a god." Titus succeeds his father as Roman emperor. Titus' Jewish mistress, Berenice, comes to join him in Rome, but he exiles her to please the Senate.
- August 24 or c. October 24 – Eruption of Mount Vesuvius: Mount Vesuvius erupts, destroying Pompeii, Herculaneum, Stabiae and Oplontis. The Roman navy (based at Misenum), commanded by Pliny the Elder, evacuates refugees. Pliny dies after inhaling volcanic fumes.
- Roman conquest of Britain: Gnaeus Julius Agricola campaigns in Britain:
  - Chester is founded as a castrum or Roman fort with the name Deva Victrix. The fortress is built by Legio II Adiutrix and contains barracks, granaries, military baths and headquarters.
  - Mamucium (the first Manchester) is founded as a frontier fort and settlement in the North West of England, a distance to the north of Chester.
  - Agricola enters Caledonia (modern-day Scotland) but is resisted by the natives.

==== China ====
- A commission of scholars canonizes the text of works of Confucius and his school.

== Births ==
- He of Han, Chinese emperor (d. 106)
- Ma Rong, Chinese poet and politician (d. 166)

== Deaths ==
- June 24 – Vespasian, Roman emperor (b. AD 9)
- August 16 – Ma, Chinese empress of the Han Dynasty (b. AD 40)
- August 25 – Caesius Bassus, Roman poet (died in the eruption of Mount Vesuvius)
- August 25 – Drusilla, daughter of Herod (died in the eruption of Vesuvius)
- August 25 – Pliny the Elder, Roman writer and scientist (b. AD 23)
- Apollinaris of Ravenna, Syrian bishop and martyr (approximate date)
- Aulus Caecina Alienus, Roman general and politician (executed)
- Tiberius Claudius Balbilus, Roman politician and astrologer (b. AD 3)
- Titus Clodius Eprius Marcellus, Roman politician (committed suicide)
