= Zuo Xiao'e =

Zuo Xiao'e (左小娥) (also Zuo Ji, also Empress Xiaode) (fl. 1st century CE) was the mother of Emperor An of the Han dynasty. A consort of Liu Qing, she was known for her love of history and poetry. She was originally from Qianwe.
