= AD 107 =

107 in various calendars
- Gregorian calendar: 107; CVII
- Ab urbe condita: 860
- Assyrian calendar: 4857
- Balinese saka calendar: 28–29
- Bengali calendar: −487 – −486
- Berber calendar: 1057
- Buddhist calendar: 651
- Burmese calendar: −531
- Byzantine calendar: 5615–5616
- Chinese calendar: 丙午年 (Fire Horse); 2804 or 2597 — to — 丁未年 (Fire Goat); 2805 or 2598
- Coptic calendar: −177 – −176
- Discordian calendar: 1273
- Ethiopian calendar: 99–100
- Hebrew calendar: 3867–3868
- Hindu calendars
- Vikram Samvat: 163–164
- Shaka Samvat: 28–29
- Kali Yuga: 3207–3208
- Holocene calendar: 10107
- Iranian calendar: 515 BP – 514 BP
- Islamic calendar: 531 BH – 530 BH
- Javanese calendar: N/A
- Julian calendar: 107; CVII
- Korean calendar: 2440
- Minguo calendar: 1805 before ROC 民前1805年
- Nanakshahi calendar: −1361
- Seleucid era: 418/419 AG
- Thai solar calendar: 649–650
- Tibetan calendar: མེ་ཕོ་རྟ་ལོ་ (male Fire-Horse); 233 or −148 or −920 — to — མེ་མོ་ལུག་ལོ་ (female Fire-Sheep); 234 or −147 or −919

Year 107 (CVII) was a common year starting on Friday of the Julian calendar. At the time, it was known as the Year of the Consulship of Sura and Senico (or, less frequently, year 860 Ab urbe condita). The denomination 107 for this year has been used since the early medieval period, when the Anno Domini calendar era became the prevalent method in Europe for naming years.

== Events ==
=== By place ===
==== Roman Empire ====
- Lucius Licinius Sura and Quintus Sosius Senecio become consuls of Rome.
- An Indian ambassador is received by Emperor Trajan.

==== Asia ====
- First year of the yongchu era of the Chinese Eastern Han dynasty.
- Liu Hu becomes Emperor An of Han.

== Deaths ==
- Titus Avidius Quietus, Roman politician and governor
- Ignatius of Antioch (possible date)
