= Deng Sui =

Empress of the Han dynasty from 102 to 106

- 鄧綏
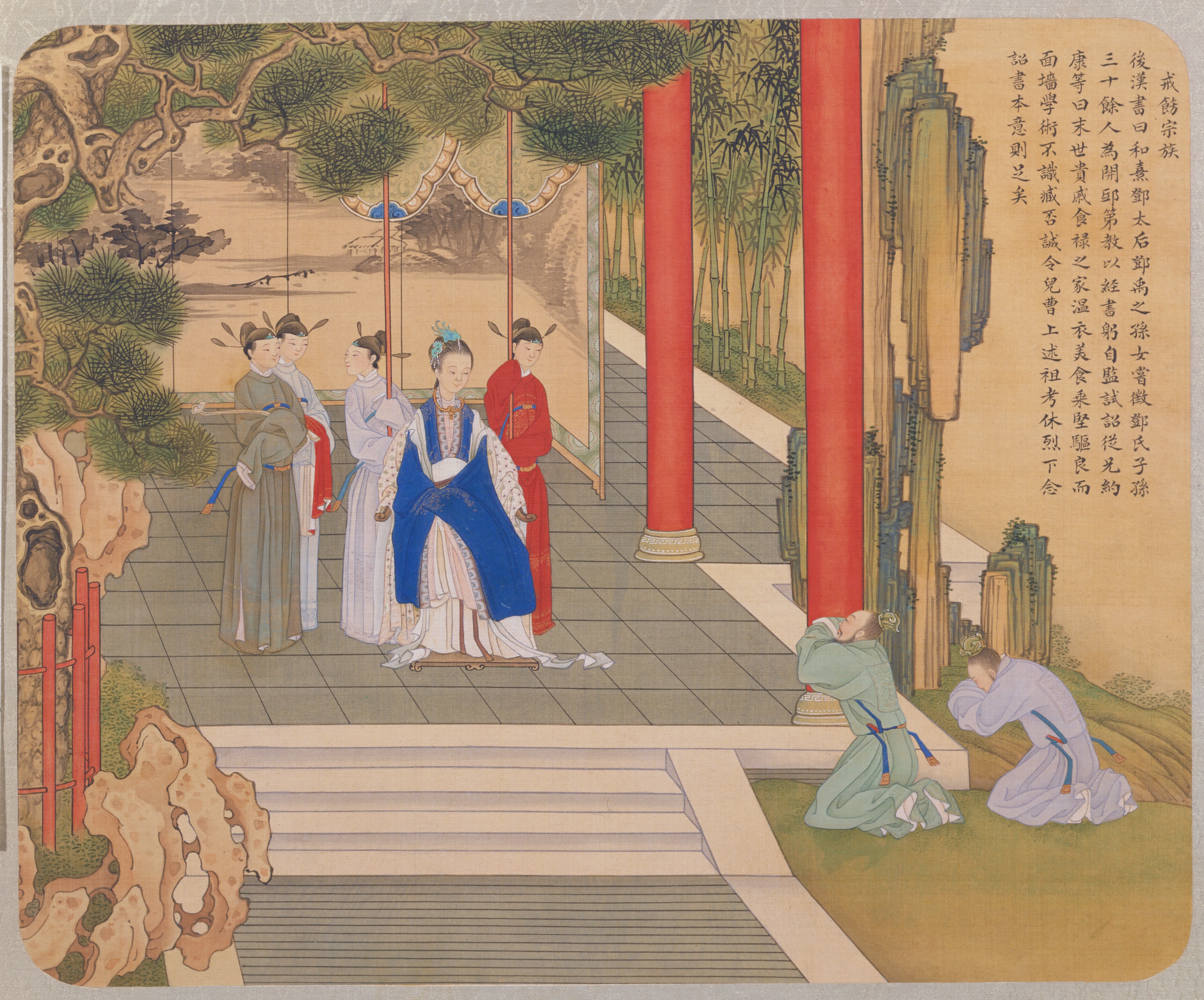
- A posthumous depiction of Deng Sui created by Jiao Bingzhen of the Qing dynasty.

Empress dowager and regent
- Regency: 106 – 121
- Successor: Empress Yan Ji

Empress consort of the Han dynasty
- Tenure: 21 November 102 – 13 February 106
- Predecessor: Empress Yin
- Successor: Empress Yan Ji
- Born: 81; Nanyang, Henan
- Died: 5 or 17 April 121 (aged 39–40); Luoyang, Henan
- Burial: Eastern Han Emperor Mausoleum
- Spouse: Emperor He of Han
Posthumous name
- Empress Hexi (和熹皇后)
- Father: Deng Xun
- Mother: Lady Yin

Deng Sui (Chinese: 鄧綏; 81 – 5 or 17 April 121), formally Empress Hexi (Chinese: 和熹皇后; lit. 'moderate and pacifying empress'), was an empress of the Eastern Han dynasty through her marriage to Emperor He of Han, and later its de facto ruler. Acting as regent twice for Emperor Shang, and then for Emperor An. Deng Sui was recognized as a merciful, intelligent leader who guided the dynasty well through a period of excessive natural disaster, disastrous famine, court intrigues, economic inflation and costly military conflicts, and she overcame all the problems and organized the government; as well as a staunch opponent of corruption and bribery, and an effective patron of education and the arts, which fostered growth and development in state. She is considered to be one of the Han dynasty's last effective rulers.

Beginning as an imperial consort to Emperor He, she managed to gain favor in the court through her humble and virtuous disposition, as well as her intelligence. She never wore lavish clothes, and refused any special privileges and gifts given to her. She gained the affections of He by expressing her concerns about him producing an heir, and suggesting other concubines that could possibly bear him one. Deng was also known for her beauty, which was recorded in many accounts and was undoubtedly the reason that He became enamored with her. Her influence in court caused He's wife, Empress Yin, to grow jealous, despite Deng's generosity towards her. Deng tried to forge a good relationship with Yin through acts of courtesy and respect, but Yin's jealousy caused her to resent Deng. Her jealousy towards Deng continued to grow until Yin was deposed due to accusations of her committing witchcraft, possibly to curse Deng. The Yin clan was exiled, and Yin later died. The same year, Deng was made empress.

As empress, Deng continued to be a humble and virtuous person. She used her status as empress to promote education and became a patron of scholarship and the arts. She opened up opportunities for scholars to become involved in the aristocracy, and encouraged original thinking, giving way to philosophers such as Ban Zhao, one of China's first known female historians and philosophers, who served as Deng's primary educator and ladies-in-waiting. As part of her humility, and possibly her education, Deng refused any tributes that would have normally been given to an empress, instead opting for paper and ink. She sponsored the usage of paper in the imperial palace, and as a result, she is considered to be responsible for the world's adoption of paper. When Emperor He died, Deng, who had not birthed him any heirs, claimed two sons from He's harem, Liu Sheng and Liu Long, both of whom were sickly. Ruling as empress dowager, she deemed Liu Long to be the less sickly of the two and made him heir. She proceeded to serve as regent for Liu Long, and when he died, she had the cousin of Liu Sheng, Prince Sheng, made heir, whom she served as regent for as well.

As regent, Deng had full control over the kingdom, and she demonstrated her intelligence through her decisions to cut taxes and reduce palace expenses, which provided great relief for the poor. She was known to be a fair leader who did not tolerate corruption, even within her own family. She was also known to be a very merciful ruler, issuing a general pardon to the family members and associates of Empress Dou (Emperor He's mother), who all had grown powerful during Emperor He's time before being toppled in a coup d'état by He, and issuing law reforms that extended the time allowed for death penalty appeals. Through her rule, she successfully guided the dynasty through a period fraught with severe hailstorms, floods, and droughts through her organization of relief efforts. Additionally, she navigated military conflict with the Xiongnu and Qiang, who were causing disturbances at the borders. Her administration is considered one of the last periods of stable and effective rule during the Eastern Han dynasty, with subsequent rulers drawn into power struggles that gradually destabilized the empire.

== Family background and early life ==
Deng Sui was born in 81 AD in Nanyang. Her father Deng Xun (鄧訓) was the sixth son of Emperor Guangwu's prime minister Deng Yu. Her mother, Lady Yin, was a daughter of a cousin of Emperor Guangwu's wife Empress Yin Lihua. She had a noted interest in studying, being able to read historical texts at age six and being able to recite the Book of Documents and Analects when she was twelve.

She was selected to be in the palace in 95. She became a consort to Emperor He in 96, when she was 15, and he was 17.

She may have been notable for her stature; at 166 centimeters she was two inches taller than the average man of the period.

== Imperial consort and empress ==
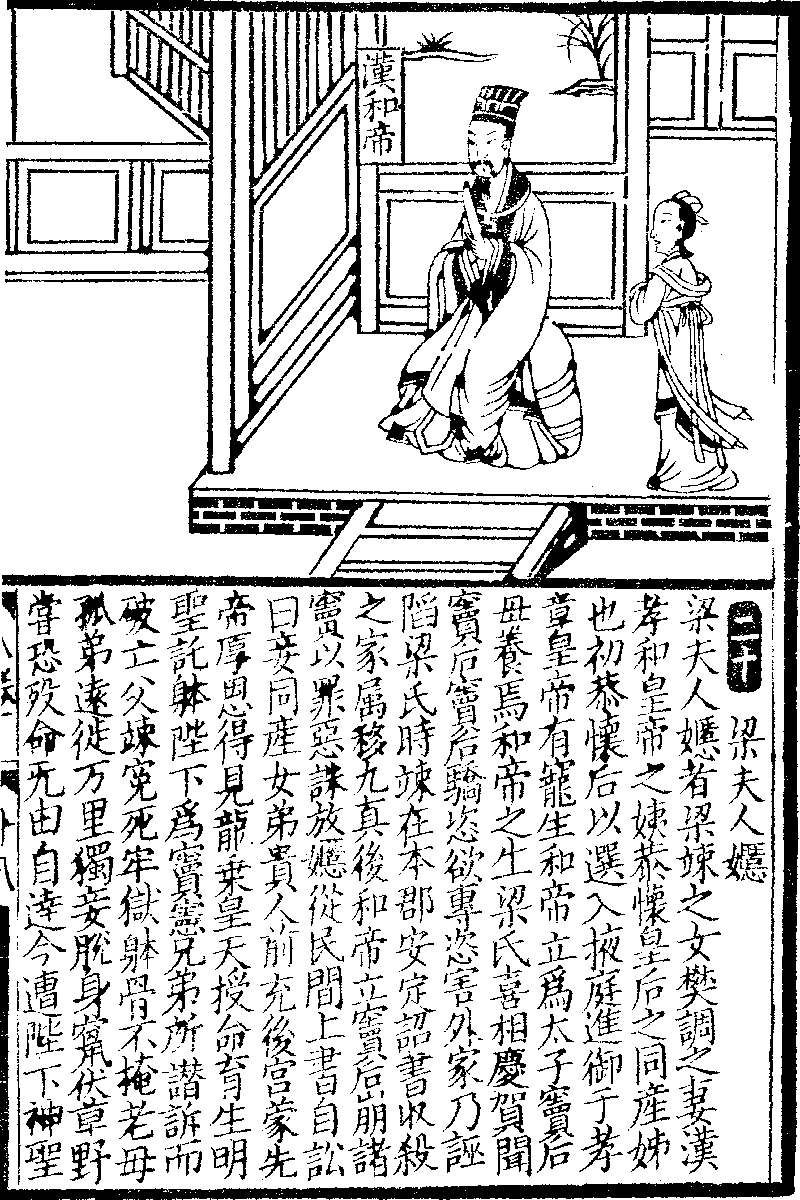
Emperor He of Han, whom Deng would later marry. When Deng became his imperial consort, he was already married to Empress Yin, but began to fall in love with her beauty and humble disposition.

When Deng Sui became an imperial consort, Emperor He had already created Empress Yin empress. Empress Yin was described as beautiful but short and clumsy, and she was also known for jealousy. Consort Deng tried to foster a proper relationship with her by being humble, and was described as constantly trying to cover Empress Yin's mistakes. This, however, only drew Empress Yin's jealousy, as Emperor He became impressed with her and considered her one of his favorites. Empress Yin was also not pleased that Consort Deng, concerned that Emperor He was constantly losing sons in childhood, often recommended other consorts for him to have sexual relations with. Once, when Emperor He was ill, Empress Yin made the remark that if she became empress dowager, the Dengs would be slaughtered. Upon hearing that remark, Consort Deng considered committing suicide, and one of her ladies-in-waiting saved her by falsely telling her that the emperor had recovered. However, the emperor did soon recover, so Consort Deng and her family escaped a terrible fate.

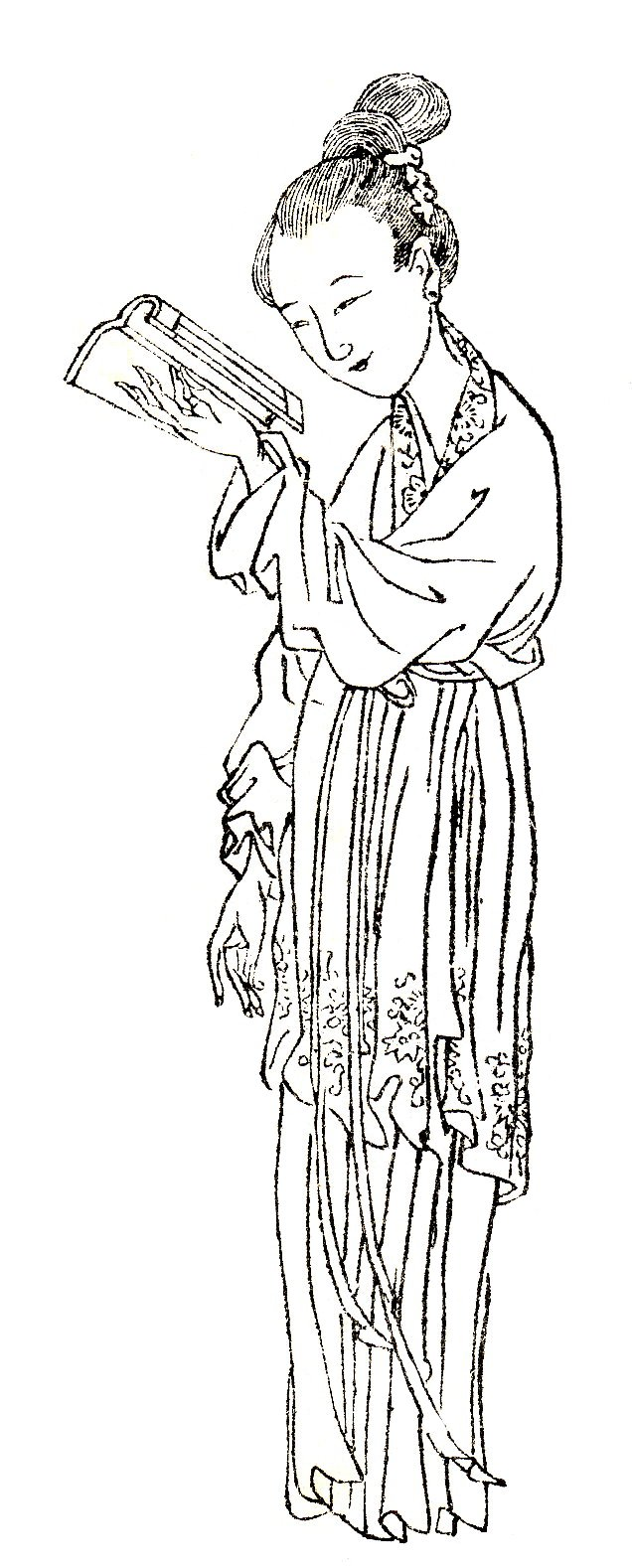
Ban Zhao, who educated and advised Deng Sui during her reign. She was the first female Chinese historian and philosopher, and she wrote Lessons for Women, a guide on women's conduct and behavior during, before, and after marriage. Deng would have most likely read Lessons during her lifetime.

In 102, Empress Yin and her grandmother, Deng Zhu (鄧朱), were accused of using witchcraft to curse imperial consorts (probably including Consort Deng). She was deposed and died of sorrow, probably in 102 as well. Emperor He created Consort Deng empress on 21 November of that year to replace her.

As empress, Empress Deng was described as diligent and humble, and she resisted offers by Emperor He to promote her relatives. She was taught by Ban Zhao, whom she made a Lady-in-Waiting.

She also prohibited the commanderies and principalities from offering her tributes—which had been customary for empresses to receive. As Empress, she refused all tributes from abroad, insisting on receiving annual gifts of paper and ink instead.

== Regency ==
=== Regency for Emperor Shang of Han ===
In 106, with China facing a financial crisis, Emperor He died, creating a succession crisis. Empress Deng and all of the imperial consorts had been without sons for a long time. (Note: Emperor He was described as having had a number of sons who died in young age; it is unclear whether Empresses Yin or Deng ever gave birth, but it appears that they did not.) Late in Emperor He's reign, he had two sons—whose mothers were not mentioned in history—Liu Sheng and Liu Long. Under the superstition of the time, it was thought that they might survive better if they grew up outside the palace in light of their other brothers' early deaths, so both were given to foster parents.

At the time Emperor He died, Liu Sheng, the older son, was still young (but actual age is not recorded in history) and believed to be constantly ill. The younger, Liu Long, was only 100 days old. Both were welcomed back to the palace, and Empress Deng created Liu Long crown prince, believing that he would be healthier, and then that night he was proclaimed emperor, as Emperor Shang. Power was in Empress Dowager Deng's hands, as regent for the infant emperor, and her brother Deng Zhi (鄧騭) quickly became the most powerful official at court. She also sought the advice of Ban Zhao, until her death in 116. She issued a general pardon, which benefitted the people who had rights stripped from them for associating with the family of Empress Dou, whose family had been powerful during the early reign of Emperor He but had been toppled in a coup d'état.

Late in 106, the young emperor died, creating yet another succession crisis. By this time, the officials had realized that Prince Sheng (then Prince of Pingyuan) was not as ill as initially thought, and they generally wanted him to be emperor. However, Empress Dowager Deng, concerned that Prince Sheng would bear a grudge for not having been made emperor first, had other ideas. She insisted on making Emperor Shang's cousin Prince Hu, who was seen by some as the rightful heir, emperor instead. He took the throne as Emperor An, at age 12.

=== Regency for Emperor An of Han ===
When Emperor An ascended the throne, his father Liu Qing was still alive, as was his wife Consort Geng—who had remained in the capital Luoyang with him until his ascension. (Emperor An's mother Consort Zuo Xiao'e (左小娥), Liu Qing's concubine, had died sometime earlier.) However, Deng Sui was able to ensure exclusive control over the young emperor still, as empress dowager, by sending Consort Geng to join her husband Liu Qing in his Principality of Qinghe.

Deng Sui showed herself to be an able regent who did not tolerate corruption, even by her own family members. She also carried out criminal law reforms. For example, in 107, she issued an edict that extended the period for death penalty appeals. She cut the expenses of the royal court, like the making of expensive handicrafts such as jade and ivory carvings and sent home palace attendants with superfluous functions. She also demanded less tribute from the provinces. While Empress, she twice opened the imperial granaries to feed the hungry; forced the reduction of income landlords received from the land they rented out; she repaired waterways and cut court rituals and banquets.

In 107, however, there would be major problems on the borders. First, kingdoms of the Western Regions (or Xiyu, modern Xinjiang and Central Asia), which had submitted to Han suzerainty during the times of the great general Ban Chao, had been resisting Ban's successors for some time due to their harsh regulations, and in 107, Empress Dowager Deng finally decreed that Xiyu be abandoned. That same year, Qiang tribes, who had been oppressed by Han officials for more than a decade and fearful that they would be ordered to quell Xiyu rebellions, rebelled themselves. This was a major rebellion, affecting a wide region over modern Shaanxi, Gansu, and northern Sichuan, and Qiang forces even made incursions into modern Shanxi and threatened the capital at one point. The situation became so severe that Deng Zhi considered abandoning Liang Province (涼州, roughly modern Gansu), a proposal that Empress Dowager Deng wisely rejected. The rebellion would not be put down until 118, by which point the western empire was in shambles.

Also, in 107 to 109, there were many natural disasters—floods, droughts, and hail, in different parts of the empire. Empress Dowager Deng was largely effective in organizing disaster relief efforts.

In 109, South Xiongnu, which had been a loyal vassal up to this point, rebelled as well, believing that Han had been so weakened by Qiang rebellions that it would be easy target. However, after Han made a strong show of force, South Xiongnu submitted again and would not become a trouble spot for the rest of Han dynasty.

On 22 November 110, Empress Dowager Deng's mother Lady Yin died. Her brothers resigned their posts to observe a period of mourning for three years, and after initially not approving the request, she eventually did, under female scholar Ban Zhao's suggestion. Even though they were without major government posts, however, they remained powerful advisors. As the years went by, Empress Dowager Deng's original humble nature appeared to entirely wear away as she hung onto power. When some of her relatives and close associates suggested that she transfer power to Emperor An, she became angry at them and would not do so.

== Death ==
In April 121, Empress Dowager Deng died and was buried with her husband Emperor He with full honors on 30 April. Emperor An finally took power at age 28. His wet nurse Wang Sheng (王聖) and trusted eunuchs Li Run (李閏) and Jiang Jing (江京), who had waited for years to have power, falsely accused Empress Dowager Deng of having considered deposing Emperor An and replacing him with his cousin, Liu Yi (劉翼) the Prince of Hejian. In anger, Emperor An removed all of Empress Dowager Deng's relatives from government and forced many of them to commit suicide. Later that year, however, he partially reversed his orders, and some of Empress Dowager Deng's relatives were allowed to return, but the clan had been decimated by then.

== Historical assessment ==
Deng is considered to have ruled "with conspicuous competence." She was regarded as an able and diligent administrator, is considered responsible for the world's first official adoption of paper, and was a patron of the arts. During her regency, she cut palace expenses, provided relief for the poor, was able to meet the challenge of natural disasters including crippling floods, droughts and hailstorms in several parts of the empire, as well as largely quelling wars with Xiongnu and Qiang. She was praised for her attention to criminal justice. Well educated, Empress Deng created new positions for scholars, encouraged original thinking, and was responsible for the standardization of the five classics. She called 70 members of the imperial families to study the classics and oversaw their examinations herself. She is seen as the last effective ruler of the Han Empire, as the later Emperors and Empress Dowagers were pulled into internal power struggles and corruption, leading to the fall of the Empire.

== Sources ==
- Monro, Alexander (2017) The Paper Trail: An Unexpected History of a Revolutionary Invention (Vintage Books)
- Book of Later Han, vols. 4, 10, part 1.
- Zizhi Tongjian, vols. 48, 49, 50.
- Bennet Peterson, Barbara (2000). Notable Women of China: Shang Dynasty to the Early Twentieth Century. M.E. Sharpe, Inc. ISBN 9780765605047.
- "Meaning of Chinese names". Archived from the original on 2 October 2013.

Chinese royalty
| Preceded by Empress Yin | Empress of the Eastern Han dynasty 102–106 | Succeeded by Empress Yan Ji |
