= AD 104 =

104 in various calendars
- Gregorian calendar: 104; CIV
- Ab urbe condita: 857
- Assyrian calendar: 4854
- Balinese saka calendar: 25–26
- Bengali calendar: −490 – −489
- Berber calendar: 1054
- Buddhist calendar: 648
- Burmese calendar: −534
- Byzantine calendar: 5612–5613
- Chinese calendar: 癸卯年 (Water Rabbit); 2801 or 2594 — to — 甲辰年 (Wood Dragon); 2802 or 2595
- Coptic calendar: −180 – −179
- Discordian calendar: 1270
- Ethiopian calendar: 96–97
- Hebrew calendar: 3864–3865
- Hindu calendars
- Vikram Samvat: 160–161
- Shaka Samvat: 25–26
- Kali Yuga: 3204–3205
- Holocene calendar: 10104
- Iranian calendar: 518 BP – 517 BP
- Islamic calendar: 534 BH – 533 BH
- Javanese calendar: N/A
- Julian calendar: 104; CIV
- Korean calendar: 2437
- Minguo calendar: 1808 before ROC 民前1808年
- Nanakshahi calendar: −1364
- Seleucid era: 415/416 AG
- Thai solar calendar: 646–647
- Tibetan calendar: ཆུ་མོ་ཡོས་ལོ་ (female Water-Hare); 230 or −151 or −923 — to — ཤིང་ཕོ་འབྲུག་ལོ་ (male Wood-Dragon); 231 or −150 or −922

Year 104 (CIV) was a leap year starting on Monday of the Julian calendar, the 104th Year of the Anno Domini (AD) designation, the 104th year of the 1st millennium, the 4th year of the 2nd century, and the 5th year of the 100s decade. At the time, it was known as the Year of the Consulship of Suburanus and Marcellus (or, less frequently, year 857 Ab urbe condita). The denomination 104 for this year has been used since the early medieval period, when the Anno Domini calendar era became the prevalent method in Europe for naming years.

== Events ==
=== By place ===
==== Roman Empire ====
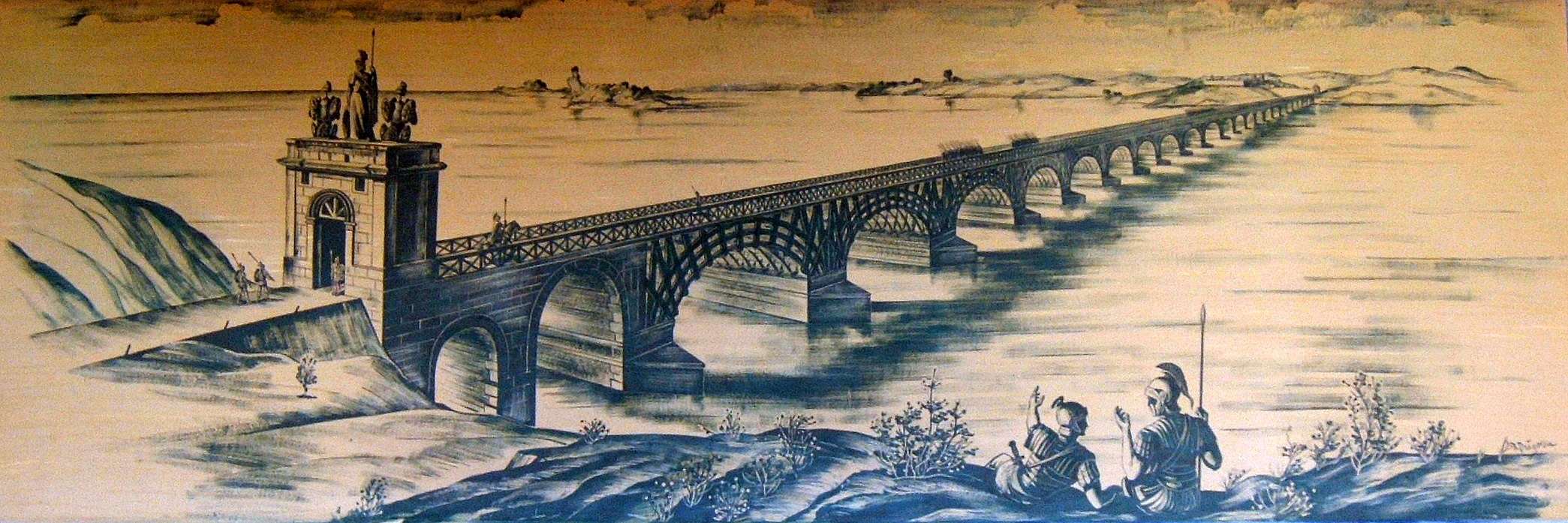
The Trajan's Bridge across the lower Danube, as seen from Drobeta. Reconstruction by the engineer E. Duperrex in 1907

- Pliny the Younger continues as a member of the College of Augurs (103–104).
- Nijmegen is renamed Ulpia Noviomagus Batavorum.
- A fire breaks out in Rome.
- Trajan gives the order to have the Alcántara Bridge, constructed by the architect Lacer, built over the Tagus River at Alcántara (Hispania).
- Apollodorus of Damascus builds a stone bridge over the Danube more than 1,000 meters (3,300 feet) long, almost 20 meters (66 feet) high and 15 meters (49 feet) wide. The bridge connects what is now Serbia with Romania (at the time known as Dacia).

=== By topic ===
==== Religion ====
- In India, figures of Buddha replace abstract motifs on decorative items.

== Births ==
- Chen Shi, Chinese politician and official (d. 187)
- Gaius Appuleius Diocles, Roman charioteer
