= Wang Sheng (Han dynasty) =

Influential wet nurse of Emperor An of Han

Wang Sheng (2nd-century), was a Chinese court official.

As recorded in the Zhizhi Tongjian, she was the wet nurse of Emperor An of Han, and subsequently had an influential position in the palace and imperial court during his reign, and was involved in several notable events.

She was, according to her critics at the time, from a "mean family". During the childhood of Emperor An, she showed him motherly care, and upon his ascension to the throne he was believed to show her great favour in return. He appointed her Lady of Yewang.

According to the Zhizhi Tongjian, Wang Sheng and her daughter, Wang Yong (called Borong), had power and favour within the court. This angered some officials. One, Yang Zhen, wrote a letter to the emperor in which he called Wang Sheng an "unworthy favorite", accusing her of greed and interference, saying she brought dishonour on the emperor and empress, and insisting the emperor should have her removed to live outside of the palace.

The emperor was not convinced, and instead showed the letter to Wang Sheng and other associates. He continued to treat her with favour. Later, Yang Zhen wrote another letter, protesting the emperor's decision to use imperial building resources make Wang Sheng's home larger.

Eventually, Wang Sheng conspired to ensure that the emperor's heir, Liu Bao, was housed in her residence. To bring this about, she allegedly slandered rivals, including the heir's own wet nurse (Want Nan) and other members of his household, leading oiheir deaths or exile. Liu Bao himself, though only nine years old, was dismissed as heir, and replaced.

After Emperor An's death, Wang Sheng and her daughter were vulnerable, no longer able to rely on his favour. Therefore, they made an alliance with other officials.
