= AD 112 =

112 in various calendars
- Gregorian calendar: 112; CXII
- Ab urbe condita: 865
- Assyrian calendar: 4862
- Balinese saka calendar: 33–34
- Bengali calendar: −482 – −481
- Berber calendar: 1062
- Buddhist calendar: 656
- Burmese calendar: −526
- Byzantine calendar: 5620–5621
- Chinese calendar: 辛亥年 (Metal Pig); 2809 or 2602 — to — 壬子年 (Water Rat); 2810 or 2603
- Coptic calendar: −172 – −171
- Discordian calendar: 1278
- Ethiopian calendar: 104–105
- Hebrew calendar: 3872–3873
- Hindu calendars
- Vikram Samvat: 168–169
- Shaka Samvat: 33–34
- Kali Yuga: 3212–3213
- Holocene calendar: 10112
- Iranian calendar: 510 BP – 509 BP
- Islamic calendar: 526 BH – 525 BH
- Javanese calendar: N/A
- Julian calendar: 112; CXII
- Korean calendar: 2445
- Minguo calendar: 1800 before ROC 民前1800年
- Nanakshahi calendar: −1356
- Seleucid era: 423/424 AG
- Thai solar calendar: 654–655
- Tibetan calendar: ལྕགས་མོ་ཕག་ལོ་ (female Iron-Boar); 238 or −143 or −915 — to — ཆུ་ཕོ་བྱི་བ་ལོ་ (male Water-Rat); 239 or −142 or −914

Year 112 (CXII) was a leap year starting on Thursday of the Julian calendar. At the time, it was known as the Year of the Consulship of Traianus and Cornelius (or, less frequently, year 865 Ab urbe condita). The denomination 112 for this year has been used since the early medieval period, when the Anno Domini calendar era became the prevalent method in Europe for naming years.

== Events ==
=== By place ===
==== Roman Empire ====
- Emperor Trajan and Titus Sextius Cornelius Africanus become Roman consuls.
- August 29 – Salonia Matidia receives the title of Augusta upon the death of Marciana.
- Hadrian succeeds Gaius Julius Cassius Steirieus as archon of Athens.
- Tacitus is named proconsul of the Roman province of Asia (112–113).

==== Asia ====
- King Jima succeeds Pasa as ruler of the Korean kingdom of Silla.

== Deaths ==
- Beatus of Lungern, Swiss monk and hermit
- Pasa (the Great), Korean ruler of Silla
