= AD 87 =

AD 87 in various calendars
- Gregorian calendar: AD 87; LXXXVII
- Ab urbe condita: 840
- Assyrian calendar: 4837
- Balinese saka calendar: 8–9
- Bengali calendar: −507 – −506
- Berber calendar: 1037
- Buddhist calendar: 631
- Burmese calendar: −551
- Byzantine calendar: 5595–5596
- Chinese calendar: 丙戌年 (Fire Dog); 2784 or 2577 — to — 丁亥年 (Fire Pig); 2785 or 2578
- Coptic calendar: −197 – −196
- Discordian calendar: 1253
- Ethiopian calendar: 79–80
- Hebrew calendar: 3847–3848
- Hindu calendars
- Vikram Samvat: 143–144
- Shaka Samvat: 8–9
- Kali Yuga: 3187–3188
- Holocene calendar: 10087
- Iranian calendar: 535 BP – 534 BP
- Islamic calendar: 551 BH – 550 BH
- Javanese calendar: N/A
- Julian calendar: AD 87; LXXXVII
- Korean calendar: 2420
- Minguo calendar: 1825 before ROC 民前1825年
- Nanakshahi calendar: −1381
- Seleucid era: 398/399 AG
- Thai solar calendar: 629–630
- Tibetan calendar: མེ་ཕོ་ཁྱི་ལོ་ (male Fire-Dog); 213 or −168 or −940 — to — མེ་མོ་ཕག་ལོ་ (female Fire-Boar); 214 or −167 or −939

AD 87 (LXXXVII) was a common year starting on Monday of the Julian calendar. At the time, it was known as the Year of the Consulship of Augustus and Saturninus (or, less frequently, year 840 Ab urbe condita). The denomination AD 87 for this year has been used since the early medieval period, when the Anno Domini calendar era became the prevalent method in Europe for naming years.

== Events ==
=== By place ===
==== Roman Empire ====
- The Roman Julius Maternus explores western Africa (approximate date).
- Lyon, a city in Gaul, has a population of over 100,000 citizens (approximate date).
- Sextus Julius Sparsus gains power in the Roman Senate (approximate date).

==== Europe ====
- Decebalus becomes king of Dacia.

== Births ==
- Pothinus, bishop of Lyon (approximate date)
- Rupilia Faustina, Roman noblewoman (approximate date)
