= Empress Yin (He) =

Empress of China from 96 to 102 CE

Empress Yin 陰皇后

Empress consort of the Eastern Han dynasty
- Tenure: 31 March 96 – 24 July 102
- Predecessor: Empress Dou
- Successor: Deng Sui
- Died: between 24 July 102 and 25 January 103 (Note: Lady Yin's biography indicate that she died after being deposed as empress, which took place on 24 Jul 102 in the Julian calendar; the year ends on 25 Jan 103.)
- Spouse: Emperor He
- Father: Yin Gang

Empress Yin (陰皇后, personal name unknown) (80? (Note: Lady Yin's age when she died was not recorded in her biography in Book of the Later Han.) – c.late 102 CE) was an empress during the Eastern Han dynasty. She was Emperor He's first wife. She was a daughter of Yin Gang (陰綱), a grandson of Emperor Guangwu's wife Empress Yin Lihua's brother Yin Shi (陰識). She became an imperial consort in 92 and quickly became a favorite of Emperor He. She was described as beautiful but short and clumsy, and often unable to carry out the ceremonies that empresses are to perform with physical grace. She was also described as arrogant due to her noble heritage.

On 31 March 96, Emperor He made her empress. In 97, he gave her father, Yin Gang, the title of the Marquess of Wufang. As the years went by, Empress Yin began to lose Emperor He's favor, particularly because she was jealous of another favorite of his, Consort Deng Sui, who came from a noble lineage herself. (Note: She was the granddaughter of Emperor Guangwu's prime minister Deng Yu.) Compared to Empress Yin's arrogance, Consort Deng was described as humble and always trying to maintain peaceful relations with other consorts and ladies in waiting. She, concerned that Emperor He was continually losing sons in young age, often would recommend other consorts for Emperor He to have sexual relations with, while Empress Yin did not. She therefore became more and more popular.

Once, when Emperor He was ill, Empress Yin made the remark that if she became empress dowager, the Dengs would be slaughtered; upon hearing that remark, Consort Deng considered committing suicide, and one of her ladies-in-waiting saved her by falsely telling her that the emperor had recovered. However, the emperor did soon recover, so Consort Deng and her family escaped a terrible fate. In 102, Empress Yin and her grandmother, Deng Zhu (鄧朱), were accused of using witchcraft to curse imperial consorts (probably including Consort Deng). Lady Deng Zhu and her sons, as well as Empress Yin's brother Yin Fu (陰輔), died under interrogation and torture. Empress Yin was deposed on 24 July, and her father Yin Gang (陰綱) committed suicide. The rest of her family was exiled. She herself died later that year. After she was deposed, Consort Deng was created empress to replace her.

In 110, Deng Sui (now Empress Dowager) allowed the Yin family and relatives to return home, giving back to them all the confiscated wealth and 500 teals of silver as compensation.

== Notes ==
Chinese royalty
| Preceded by Empress Dou | Empress of the Eastern Han dynasty 96–102 | Succeeded by Deng Sui |
