= Kong Zhou (Eastern Han) =

Chinese military commander (103-163)

Kong Zhou (103 – 10 March 163, Mandarin Chinese: 孔宙, "Pinyin: Kǒng Zhòu") was the 19th lineal descendant of Confucius. He was also the father of Kong Rong. Kong Zhou had served as captain (都尉) of Mount Tai Commandery.
