= Emperor Shang of Han =

Emperor of the Han dynasty in 106

Emperor Shang of Han 漢殤帝

Emperor of the Han dynasty
- Reign: 13 February – 21 September, 106
- Predecessor: Emperor He
- Successor: Emperor An
- Born: late October or early November 105
- Died: 21 September 106 (aged <1 year)
Names
- Liu Long (劉隆)
Era dates
- Yanping (延平; 106)
Posthumous name
- Short: Emperor Shang (殤帝); Full: Xiaoshang (孝殤)
- House: House of Liu
- Father: Emperor He

Emperor Shang of Han (Chinese: 漢殤帝; pinyin: Hàn Shāngdì; Wade–Giles: Han Shang-ti; late October or early November 105 – 21 September 106) was the 21st emperor of the Chinese Han dynasty and the fifth emperor of the Eastern Han.

Born Liu Long (劉隆), the infant was placed on the throne by the Empress Dowager Deng Sui when he was barely 100 days old, despite him having an older brother, Liu Sheng (劉勝).

Empress Dowager Deng also kept Liu Hu (劉祜) – the twelve-year-old cousin of the young emperor and future Emperor An of Han – in the capital Luoyang as insurance against the emperor's death. Liu Hu ascended to the throne when Emperor Shang died in September 106; however, Dowager Deng still remained as the regent for the teenager Emperor An. A decree by Empress Dowager Deng during this reign shed light on bureaucratic inefficiency.

Emperor Shang's reign, like his father's before him, was once again marred by corrupt eunuchs interfering themselves in important matters of state. Emperor Shang was both the shortest-living emperor and the youngest emperor to ascend to the throne in Chinese history.

== Early life ==
Prince Liu Long was born in autumn 105 to Emperor He and a concubine whose identity is unknown. Because Emperor He had, during his reign, frequently lost sons due to childhood illnesses, according to the superstitions of the time, both Prince Long and his older brother Prince Sheng were given to foster parents outside the palace to nurture.

When Emperor He died in February 106, his wife, Empress Deng Sui, brought the young princes back to the palace. Prince Sheng was older but regarded as frequently ill and unfit for the throne; therefore Empress Deng created the infant Prince Long crown prince and soon after had him proclaimed Emperor Shang, with Empress Deng acting as empress dowager.

== Reign ==
After Emperor Shang was proclaimed emperor, his brother Prince Sheng was created the Prince of Pingyuan.

Concerned that Emperor Shang might not live long, Empress Dowager Deng also kept Liu Hu (劉祜) – the twelve-year-old cousin of the young emperor and future Emperor An of Han – in the capital Luoyang as insurance against the emperor's death. Prince Hu was viewed by some as the rightful heir to Emperor He, as he was the son of Prince Qing of Qinghe, who was once a crown prince under Emperor He's father Emperor Zhang but was deposed due to machinations of Emperor Zhang's wife Empress Dou.

As Emperor Shang was an infant, actual and formal power were vested with Empress Dowager Deng. Her brother Deng Zhi (鄧騭) became the most powerful official in the imperial government. During the short reign, Empress Dowager Deng issued a general pardon to those who had had rights stripped from them for associating with the family of Empress Dou.

=== Death ===
In September 106, Emperor Shang died. The officials had by this time realized that his older brother, Prince Sheng, was not as ill as originally thought and therefore wanted to make him emperor. However, Empress Dowager Deng was concerned that Prince Sheng might bear a grudge at not being made emperor before his brother, and therefore insisted on making Emperor Shang's cousin, Prince Hu, emperor instead.

Emperor Shang, having died as a toddler, was not given a separate tomb, as was customary for emperors. Rather, in order to avoid unnecessary expenses, he was buried in the same tomb complex as his father Emperor He.

Prince Hu ascended to the throne – with the posthumous name "Emperor An" – when Emperor Shang died in 106; however, Dowager Deng still remained as the regent for the teenager Emperor An. A decree by Empress Dowager Deng during this reign shed light on bureaucratic inefficiency.

== Era name ==
- Yanping (延平) 106

== See also ==
- Family tree of the Han dynasty

Emperor Shang of Han House of Liu Born: 105 Died: 106
Regnal titles
Preceded by Emperor He of Han	Emperor of China; Eastern Han; 106 with Empress Dowager Deng (105–106)	Succeeded by Emperor An of Han
