= Emperor An of Han =

Emperor of Han China from 106 to 125

Emperor An of Han 漢安帝

Emperor of the Han dynasty
- Reign: 23 September 106 – 30 April 125
- Predecessor: Emperor Shang
- Successor: Marquess of Beixiang
- Born: 94
- Died: 30 April 125 (aged 30-31)
- Consorts: Empress Ansi
- Issue: Emperor Shun
Names
- Liu Hu (劉祜)
Era dates
- Yongchu (永初; 107–113); Yuanchu (元初; 114–121); Yongning (永寧; 121–122); Jianguang (建光; 121–122); Yanguang (延光; 122–125)
Posthumous name
- Short: Emperor An (安帝); Full: Xiao'an (孝安)
Temple name
- Gongzong (恭宗) (revoked in 190)
- House: House of Liu
- Father: Liu Qing
- Mother: Lady Zuo Xiao'e

Emperor An of Han (Chinese: 漢安帝; pinyin: Hàn Āndì; Wade–Giles: Han An-ti; 94 – 30 April 125) was the 22nd emperor of the Han dynasty and the sixth emperor of the Eastern Han, ruling from 106 to 125. He was a grandson of Emperor Zhang and cousin to Emperor Shang of Han, who died while Deng Sui, the empress dowager, served as regent.

When her infant stepson Emperor Shang succeeded to the throne in February 106, Empress Dowager Deng kept the then-12-year-old Crown Prince Liu Hu in the capital Luoyang as insurance against the infant emperor's death and the successor to the throne. Prince Hu ascended the throne and became emperor when Emperor Shang died in September 106. However, Empress Dowager Deng still remained as regent until her death in April 121. Thereafter, Emperor An removed many of her relatives from government and many of them committed suicide, probably under duress.

Emperor An did little to revive the withering dynasty. He began to indulge himself in women and heavy drinking and paid little attention to affairs of state, instead leaving matters to corrupt eunuchs. In this way, he effectively became the first emperor in Han history to encourage corruption. He also trusted his wife Empress Yan Ji and her family deeply, despite their obvious corruption. At the same time, droughts ravaged the country while peasants rose up in arms. In April 125, Emperor An died while travelling to Nanyang. He was only 31.

== Family background and accession to the throne ==
Then-Prince Hu was born in 94, to Prince Liu Qing of Qinghe and his concubine, Consort Zuo Xiao E (左小娥). Prince Qing was the older brother of Emperor He, and had once been crown prince under their father, Emperor Zhang, until the machinations of Emperor Zhang's wife, Empress Dou, led to his removal and his mother Consort Song's death. During Emperor He's reign, however, he was a trusted advisor to the emperor, and he had a major role in Emperor He's coup d'état against Empress Dou's domineering brother, Dou Xian, in 92.

When they were young, consort Zuo and her older sister Da E (左大娥) were both confiscated and made court servant girls because their uncle, Zuo Sheng (左聖), had been executed for making defamatory remarks against the emperor or imperial administration. As they grew older, they became known for beauty and talent and became ladies in waiting in Emperor He's palace; Xiao E was particularly known for her knowledge in history and poetry. At Prince Qing's request, Emperor He rewarded him with the two consorts. Both died sometime before Emperor He's death in 106 and were buried in the capital Luoyang. After Consort Zuo's death, Prince Hu was raised by Prince Qing's wife, Consort Geng (耿姬).

When Emperor He died in 106, his infant son, Emperor Shang, ascended the throne. Most of Emperor He's brothers, including Prince Qing, remained in the palace at Luoyang but were ordered to report to their principalities. As an insurance measure, Emperor He's wife, Empress Dowager Deng, kept Prince Qing's wife and 12-year-old son (Prince Hu). When Emperor Shang died later in 106, the officials largely wanted to make Emperor Shang's brother, Prince Sheng (劉勝) of Pingyuan, emperor. However, Empress Deng had initially denied Prince Sheng the throne because she believed him to be frequently ill; she was concerned that he would bear a grudge against her. At her insistence, Prince Hu ascended the throne as Emperor An.

== Early reign: regency by Empress Dowager Deng ==
After Emperor An ascended the throne, however, the real power remained in Empress Dowager Deng's hands. She sent Consort Geng to join her husband in the Principality of Qinghe (in modern central Hebei) so that Emperor An had no real influence on the administration.

Empress Dowager Deng was generally a capable ruler. While there were natural disasters and wars with Qiang and South Xiongnu, she generally coped with those emergencies well. She also carried out many criminal law reforms. During her regency, Emperor An appeared to have minimal input into the affairs of state. Meanwhile, he became heavily personally influenced by the eunuchs Jiang Jing (江京) and Li Run (李閏), and even more so by his wet nurse Wang Sheng (王聖). He was especially heavily influenced by his favorite consort, Empress Yan Ji (閻姬). He made Yan Ji empress in 115, even though she had poisoned one of his other consorts, Consort Li, who had given birth to his only son Liu Bao (劉保) earlier that year. While these people lacked real power as long as Empress Dowager Deng lived, they were planning to take power as soon as she was no longer on the scene. Empress Dowager Deng was somewhat aware of these plans and was offended; she was also disappointed that Emperor An, who was considered a precocious and intelligent child, had neglected his studies and became only interested in drinking and women. It is suspected that at some point, she even considered replacing the emperor with his cousin Liu Yi (劉翼), the Prince of Pingyuan. However, she eventually decided against it.

On 25 May 120, Emperor An named his only son, Prince Bao, crown prince.

== Late reign ==
Empress Dowager Deng died in April 121. At the age of 27, Emperor An finally had the reins of the imperial administration. He posthumously honored his father Prince Qing as Emperor Xiaode and his mother Consort Zuo as Empress Xiaode; his paternal grandmother Consort Song as Empress Jingyin; and his stepmother Consort Geng with the unique title of "Grand Consort of Gānlíng" (甘陵大貴人, Ganling being Prince Qing's tomb), a title inferior to his mother's, even though Consort Geng was his father's wife. He, however, was close to her and her brother Geng Bao (耿寶), and he quickly made his step-uncle a powerful official in his administration.

Initially, Emperor An continued to follow Empress Dowager Deng's policies, including leaving members of her clan in important advisory positions. However, his own close circle of associates, including Jiang, Li, Wang, and Empress Yan, were ready to act. Late in 121, he stripped members of the Deng clan of their posts and fiefs, and many of them committed suicide, probably under duress. Later, he relented and allowed some of the survivors to return, but by that time the Deng clan had been decimated.

In the place of the Dengs, the Song clan of Emperor An's grandmother became honored, but wielding much more actual power were the clan of the empress, the Yans—in particular Empress Yan's brothers Yan Xian (閻顯), Yan Jing (閻景), and Yan Yao (閻耀). Also powerful were the eunuchs Jiang and Li, who had been made marquesses. They, along with several other eunuchs, as well as Wang and her daughter Bo Rong (伯榮), became extremely corrupt in their ways. Emperor An ignored criticism of these people and failed to punish them for their corruption. He often listened to their suggestions while ignoring the advice of his key officials. One of the most outspoken ones, Yang Zhen (楊震), the commander of the armed forces, was eventually removed from his post in 124 and committed suicide in protest.

In 121, there were again Qiang and Xianbei rebellions, which would continue to plague Emperor An for the rest of his reign. The only border where there were Han accomplishments during Emperor An's reign was on the northwestern front—the Xiyu (modern Xinjiang and former Soviet central Asia)—where Ban Chao's son Ban Yong (班勇) was able to reestablish Han dominance over a number of kingdoms.

In 124, Wang Sheng, Jiang Jing, and another eunuch Fan Feng (樊豐) falsely accused Crown Prince Bao's wet nurse Wang Nan (王男) and chef Bing Ji (邴吉, not to be confused with Emperor Xuan's prime minister of the same name), and Wang and Bing were executed. Crown Prince Bao was greatly saddened. Jiang and Fan, fearful of reprisals later, entered into a conspiracy with Empress Yan (who had always hated Crown Prince Bao as not born of herself) to falsely accuse Crown Prince Bao and his servants of crimes. Emperor An believed these charges, and demoted Crown Prince Bao to Prince of Jiyin.

In April 125, Emperor An was on a trip to Wancheng (宛城, in modern Nanyang, Henan) when he suddenly felt ill and decided to return to Luoyang. Before he could, however, he died. Empress Yan did not want to allow his son Prince Bao to be emperor. Instead, she made Liu Yi (劉懿) emperor; Liu Yi had been the Marquess of Beixiang and was both a grandson of Emperor Zhang and Emperor An's cousin. He is generally believed to have been far younger than Prince Bao, who was ten years old at the time, though his actual age is not recorded in history. On 11 June 125, Emperor An was buried and given the temple name "Gongzong".

The young emperor, however, died later in December that year, and a number of eunuchs loyal to Prince Bao, led by Sun Cheng, carried out a coup d'état and made Prince Bao emperor (as Emperor Shun). The Yans were slaughtered, except for Empress Dowager Yan. Later, in 190, during the reign of Emperor Xian of Han, Emperor An's temple name was revoked.

== Era names ==
- Yongchu (永初) 107–113
- Yuanchu (元初) 114–120
- Yongning (永寧) 120–121
- Jianguang (建光) 121–122
- Yanguang (延光) 122–125

== Family ==
- Empress Ansi, of the Yan clan (安思皇后 閻氏; d. 126)Personal Name Ji (姬)
- Empress Gongmin, of the Li clan (恭愍皇后 李氏; d. 115)
  - Liu Bao, Emperor Xiaoshun (孝順皇帝 劉保; 115–144), first son

== See also ==
1. Family tree of the Han dynasty

Emperor An of Han House of Liu Born: 94 Died: 30 April 125
Regnal titles
Preceded by Emperor Shang of Han	Emperor of China; Eastern Han; 106–125 with Empress Dowager Deng (106–121)	Succeeded by Marquess of Beixiang
