= Book of the Later Han =

5th-century Chinese history book

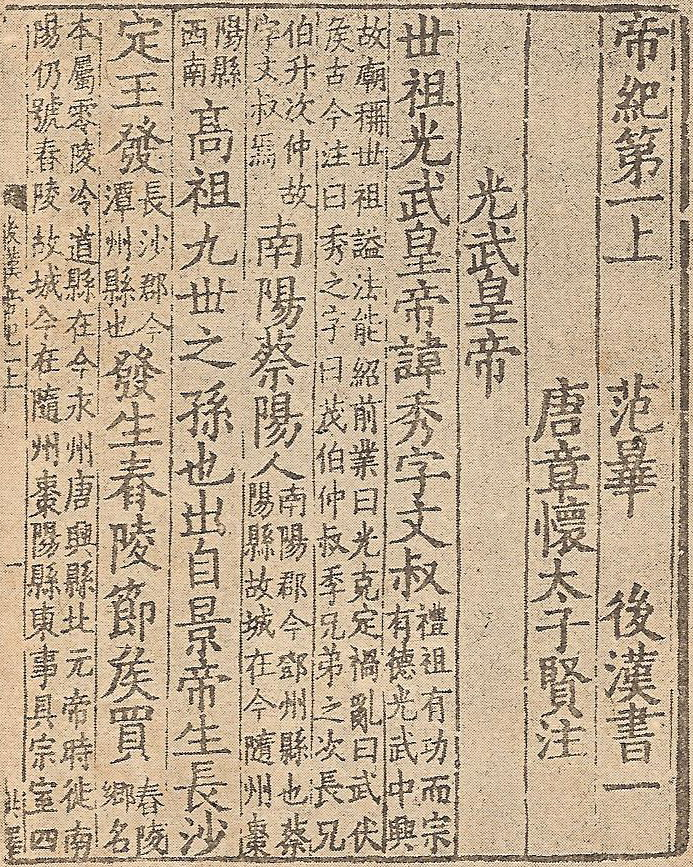
- First page of the book
- Author: Fan Ye et al
- Original title: 後漢書
- Language: Classical Chinese
- Subject: Ancient Chinese history (Eastern Han dynasty)
- Publication date: 5th century
- Publication place: China

Book of the Later Han
- Traditional Chinese: 後漢書
- Simplified Chinese: 后汉书
Transcriptions
Standard Mandarin
- Hanyu Pinyin: Hòu Hànshū
- Wade–Giles: Hou Han-shu
Southern Min
- Hokkien POJ: Hiō Hàn-su

Hou Hanshu (Chinese: 後漢書) also known in English as the Book of the Later Han, or History of the Later Han, is one of the Twenty-Four Histories and covers the history of the Han dynasty from 6 to 189 CE, a period known as the Later or Eastern Han. The book was compiled by Fan Ye and others in the 5th century during the Liu Song dynasty, using a number of earlier histories and documents as sources.

== Background ==
In 23 CE, Han dynasty official Wang Mang was overthrown by a peasants' revolt known as the Red Eyebrows. His fall separates the Early (or Western) Han dynasty from the Later (or Eastern) Han dynasty.

As an orthodox history, the book is unusual in being completed over two hundred years after the fall of the dynasty. (Note: The Book of Jin was compiled in the Tang dynasty, also over two hundred years after the fall of the Eastern Jin.) Fan Ye's primary source was the Dongguan Hanji (東觀漢記; "Han Records of the Eastern Lodge"), which was written during the Han dynasty itself.

== Contents ==
The book is part of four early historiographies of the Twenty-Four Histories canon, together with the Records of the Grand Historian, Book of Han and Records of the Three Kingdoms. Fan Ye used earlier histories, including accounts by Sima Qian and Ban Gu, along with many others (some had similar names, such as the Han Records of the Eastern Lodge by various contemporaries throughout the 2nd century, and the Annals of the Later Han by Yuan Hong from the 4th century), most of which did not survive intact.

The section on the Treatise on the Western Regions was based on a report composed by Ban Yong (with a few later additions) and presented to Emperor An of Han in around 125. It presumably includes notes from his father Ban Chao. It forms the 88th chapter (or 118th chapter in some editions) of the Book of the Later Han, and is a key source for the cultural and socio-economic data on the Western Regions, including the earliest accounts of Daqin (the Roman Empire), and some of the most detailed early reports on India and Central Asia. It records the occurrence of a solar eclipse followed by a circular halo a few days later during the reign of Emperor Guangwu, who proclaimed that he would pardon all of the sins of the population himself after such an event, which he interpreted as a sign of the state of affairs of both Heaven and mankind being upended. It also contains a few references to events occurring after the death of Emperor An, including a brief account of the arrival of the first official envoys from Rome in 166.

Fan Ye, himself, clearly says that the new information contained in this section on the Western Regions, is largely based on information from the report of Ban Yong:

"Ban Gu has recorded in detail the local conditions and customs of each kingdom in the former book [Book of Han or 'History of the Former Han Dynasty']. Now, the reports of the Jianwu period [25-56] onwards recorded in this 'Chapter on the Western Regions' differ from the earlier [ones by Ban Gu]; they are from Ban Yong's report [presented] at the end of [the reign of] Emperor An [107-125], and so on."

Fan Ye's text was later annotated at least twice, first by Liang dynasty scholar Liu Zhao, and later by a team led by Crown Prince Zhanghuai of the Tang dynasty.

=== Annals (紀) ===
#	Title	Translation	Notes
Volume 1 (Part 1)	卷一上 光武帝紀 第一上	Annals of Emperor Guangwu	Emperor Guangwu of Han
Volume 1 (Part 2)	卷一下 光武帝紀 第一下	Annals of Emperor Guangwu	Emperor Guangwu of Han
Volume 2	卷二 顯宗孝明帝紀 第二	Annals of Emperor Xianzong Xiaoming	Emperor Ming of Han
Volume 3	卷三 肅宗孝章帝紀 第三	Annals of Emperor Suzong Xiaozhang	Emperor Zhang of Han
Volume 4	卷四 孝和孝殤帝紀 第四	Annals of Emperor Xiaohe; Emperor Xiaoshang	Emperor He of Han; Emperor Shang of Han
Volume 5	卷五 孝安帝紀 第五	Annals of Emperor Xiao'an	Emperor An of Han
Volume 6	卷六 孝順孝沖孝質帝紀 第六	Annals of Emperor Xiaoshun; Emperor Xiaochong; Emperor Xiaozhi	Emperor Shun of Han; Emperor Chong of Han; Emperor Zhi of Han
Volume 7	卷七 孝桓帝紀 第七	Annals of Emperor Xiaohuan	Emperor Huan of Han
Volume 8	卷八 孝靈帝紀 第八	Annals of Emperor Xiaoling	Emperor Ling of Han
Volume 9	卷九 孝獻帝紀 第九	Annals of Emperor Xiaoxian	Emperor Xian of Han; Liu Bian
Volume 10 (Part 1)	卷十上 皇后紀 第十上	Annals of Empresses	Guo Shengtong; Yin Lihua; Empress Ma; Consort Jia; Empress Dou; Empress Yin; Deng Sui
Volume 10 (Part 2)	卷十下 皇后紀 第十下	Annals of Empresses	Yan Ji; Liang Na; Beautiful Lady Yu; Lady Chen; Empress Yan Ming; Liang Nüying; Deng Mengnü; Dou Miao; Empress Dong; Empress Song; Empress He; Fu Shou; Empress Cao Jie

=== Biographies (列傳) ===
Note: (Note: Some editions placed this section after the "records" section. Thus, an alternate numbering order would be volumes 41 to 120.)

#	Title	Translation	Notes
Volume 11	卷十一 劉玄劉盆子列傳 第一	Biographies of Liu Xuan; Liu Penzi	
Volume 12	卷十二 王劉張李彭盧列傳 第二	Biographies of Wang, Liu, Zhang, Li, Peng, Lu	Wang Chang (王昌); Liu Yong (劉永); Pang Meng (龐萌); Zhang Bu (張步); Wang Hong (王閎); Li Xian (李憲); Peng Chong (彭寵); Lu Fang (盧芳)
Volume 13	卷十三 隗囂公孫述列傳 第三	Biographies of Wei Xiao; Gongsun Shu	
Volume 14	卷十四 宗室四王三侯列傳 第四	Biographies of the Imperial Clan, Four Princes and Three Marquises	Liu Yan; Liu Xing (劉興); Liu Liang (劉良); Liu Zhi (劉祉); Liu Xi (劉歙); Liu Ci (劉賜); Liu Shun (劉順); Liu Jia (劉嘉)
Volume 15	卷十五 李王鄧來列傳 第五	Biographies of Li, Wang, Deng, Lai	Li Tong (李通); Wang Chang (王常); Deng Chen (鄧晨); Lai Xi (來歙)
Volume 16	卷十六 鄧寇列傳 第六	Biographies of Deng, Kou	Deng Yu; Kou Xun (寇恂)
Volume 17	卷十七 馮岑賈列傳 第七	Biographies of Feng, Cen, Jia	Feng Yi; Cen Peng (岑彭); Jia Fu (賈復)
Volume 18	卷十八 吳蓋陳臧列傳 第八	Biographies of Wu, Gai, Chen, Zang	Wu Han; Gai Yan (蓋延); Chen Jun (陳俊); Zang Gong (臧宮)
Volume 19	卷十九 耿弇列傳 第九	Biography of Geng Yan	
Volume 20	卷二十 銚期王霸祭遵列傳 第十	Biographies of Tiao Qi; Wang Ba; Zhai Zun	
Volume 21	卷二十一 任李萬邳劉耿列傳 第十一	Biographies of Ren, Li, Wan, Pi, Liu, Geng	Ren Guang (任光); Li Zhong (李忠); Wan Xiu (萬脩); Pi Tong (邳彤); Liu Zhi (劉植); Geng Chun (耿純)
Volume 22	卷二十二 朱景王杜馬劉傅堅馬列傳 第十二	Biographies of Zhu, Jing, Wang, Du, Ma, Liu, Fu, Jian, Ma	Zhu You (朱祐); Jing Dan (景丹); Wang Liang (王梁); Du Mao (杜茂); Ma Cheng (馬成); Liu Long (劉隆); Fu Jun (傅俊); Jian Tan (堅鐔); Ma Wu (馬武)
Volume 23	卷二十三 竇融列傳 第十三	Biography of Dou Rong	Dou Rong (竇融); Dou Gu; Dou Xian; Dou Zhang (竇章)
Volume 24	卷二十四 馬援列傳 第十四	Biography of Ma Yuan	
Volume 25	卷二十五 卓魯魏劉列傳 第十五	Biography of Zhuo, Lu, Wei, Liu	Zhuo Mao (卓茂); Lu Gong (魯恭); Wei Ba (魏霸); Liu Kuan (劉寬)
Volume 26	卷二十六 伏侯宋蔡馮趙牟韋列傳 第十六	Biographies of Fu, Hou, Song, Cai, Feng, Zhao, Mou, Wei	Fu Zhan (伏湛); Hou Ba (侯霸); Song Hong (宋弘); Cai Mao (蔡茂); Guo He (郭賀); Feng Qin (馮勤); Zhao Xi (趙憙); Mou Rong (牟融); Wei Biao (韋彪)
Volume 27	卷二十七 宣張二王杜郭吳承鄭趙列傳 第十七	Biographies of Xuan, Zhang, two Wangs, Du, Guo, Wu, Cheng, Zheng, Zhao	Xuan Bing (宣秉); Zhang Zhan (張湛); Wang Dan (王丹); Wang Liang (王良); Du Lin (杜林); Guo Dan (郭丹); Wu Liang (吳良); Cheng Gong (承宮); Zheng Jun (鄭均); Zhao Dian (趙典)
Volume 28 (Part 1)	卷二十八上 桓譚馮衍列傳 第十八上	Biographies of Huan Tan; Feng Yan	
Volume 28 (Part 2)	卷二十八下 馮衍傳 第十八下	Biography of Feng Yan	Feng Bao (馮豹)
Volume 29	卷二十九 申屠剛鮑永郅惲列傳 第十九	Biographies of Shentu Gang (申屠刚); Bao Yong; Zhi Yun	
Volume 30 (Part 1)	卷三十上 蘇竟楊厚列傳 第二十上	Biographies of Su Jing; Yang Hou	
Volume 30 (Part 2)	卷三十下 郎顗襄楷列傳 第二十下	Biographies of Lang Yi; Xiang Kai	
Volume 31	卷三十一 郭杜孔張廉王蘇羊賈陸列傳 第二十一	Biographies of Guo, Du, Kong, Zhang, Lian, Wang, Su, Yang, Jia, Lu	Guo Ji (郭伋); Du Shi; Kong Fen (孔奮); Zhang Kan (張堪); Lian Fan (廉范); Wang Tang (王堂); Su Zhang (蘇章); Yang Xu (羊續); Jia Cong (賈琮); Lu Kang (陸康)
Volume 32	卷三十二 樊宏陰識列傳 第二十二	Biographies of Fan Hong; Yin Shi	
Volume 33	卷三十三 朱馮虞鄭周列傳 第二十三	Biographies of Zhu, Feng, Yu, Zheng, Zhou	Zhu Fu (朱浮); Feng Fang (馮魴); Yu Yan (虞延); Zheng Hong (鄭弘); Zhou Zhang (周章)
Volume 34	卷三十四 梁統列傳 第二十四	Biography of Liang Tong	
Volume 35	卷三十五 張曹鄭列傳 第二十五	Biographies of Zhang, Cao, Zheng	Zhang Chun; Zhang Fen (張奮); Cao Bao (曹褒); Zheng Xuan
Volume 36	卷三十六 鄭范陳賈張列傳 第二十六	Biographies of Zheng, Fan, Chen, Jia, Zhang	Zheng Xing (鄭興); Zheng Zhong (鄭衆); Fan Sheng (范升); Chen Yuan (陳元); Jia Kui (賈逵); Zhang Ba (張霸); Zhang Kai (張楷); Zhang Ling; Zhang Xuan (張玄)
Volume 37	卷三十七 桓榮丁鴻列傳 第二十七	Biographies of Huan Rong, Ding Hong	
Volume 38	卷三十八 張法滕馮度楊列傳 第二十八	Biographies of Zhang, Fa, Teng, Feng, Du, Yang	Zhang Zong (張宗); Fa Xiong (法雄); Teng Fu (滕撫); Feng Gun (馮緄); Du Shang (度尚); Yang Xuan (楊璿)
Volume 39	卷三十九 劉趙淳于江劉周趙列傳 第二十九	Biographies of Liu, Zhao, Chunyu, Jiang, Liu, Zhou, Zhao	Liu Ping (劉平); Zhao Xiao (趙孝); Chunyu Gong (淳于恭); Jiang Ge (江革); Liu Ban (劉般); Zhou Pan (周磐); Zhao Zi (趙咨)
Volume 40 (Part 1)	卷四十上 班彪列傳 第三十上	Biography of Ban Biao	
Volume 40 (Part 2)	卷四十下 班彪列傳 第三十下	Biography of Ban Biao	Ban Gu
Volume 41	卷四十一 第五鍾離宋寒列傳 第三十一	Biographies of Diwu, Zhongli, Song, Han	Diwu Lun (第五倫); Zhongli Yi (鍾離意); Song Jun (宋均); Han Lang (寒朗)
Volume 42	卷四十二 光武十王列傳 第三十二	Biographies of Ten Princes of Guangwu	Liu Jiang (劉彊); Liu Fu (劉輔); Liu Kang (劉康); Liu Yan (劉延); Liu Yan (劉焉); Liu Ying; Liu Cang (劉蒼); Liu Jing (劉荊); Liu Heng (劉衡); Liu Jing (劉京)
Volume 43	卷四十三 朱樂何列傳 第三十三	Biographies of Zhu, Yue, He	Zhu Hui (朱暉); Sun Mu (孫穆); Yue Hui (樂恢); He Chang (何敞)
Volume 44	卷四十四 鄧張徐張胡列傳 第三十四	Biographies of Deng, Zhang, Xu, Zhang, Hu	Deng Biao (鄧彪); Zhang Yu (張禹); Xu Fang (徐防); Zhang Min (張敏); Hu Guang (胡廣)
Volume 45	卷四十五 袁張韓周列傳 第三十五	Biographies of Yuan, Zhang, Han, Zhou	Yuan An; Yuan Jing (袁京); Yuan Chang (袁敞); Zhang Pu (張酺); Han Leng (韓棱); Zhou Rong (周榮)
Volume 46	卷四十六 郭陳列傳 第三十六	Biographies of Guo, Chen	Guo Gong (郭躬); Chen Chong (陳寵)
Volume 47	卷四十七 班梁列傳 第三十七	Biographies of Ban, Liang	Ban Chao; Liang Jin (梁慬)
Volume 48	卷四十八 楊李翟應霍爰徐列傳 第三十八	Biographies of Yang, Li, Di, Ying, Huo, Yuan, Xu	Yang Zhong (楊終); Li Fa (李法); Di Pu (翟酺); Ying Feng (應奉); Ying Shao; Huo Xu (霍諝); Yuan Yan (爰延); Xu Qiu (徐璆)
Volume 49	卷四十九 王充王符仲長統列傳 第三十九	Biographies of Wang Chong, Wang Fu, Zhongchang Tong	
Volume 50	卷五十 孝明八王列傳 第四十	Biographies of Eight Princes of Xiaoming	Liu Jian (劉建); Liu Xian (劉羨); Liu Gong (劉恭); Liu Dang (劉黨); Liu Yan (劉衍); Liu Chang (劉暢); Liu Bing (劉昞); Liu Chang (劉長)
Volume 51	卷五十一 李陳龐陳橋列傳 第四十一	Biographies of Li, Chen, Pang, Chen, Qiao	Li Xun (李恂); Chen Shan (陳禪); Pang Shen (龐參); Chen Gui (陳龜), Qiao Xuan
Volume 52	卷五十二 崔駰列傳 第四十二	Biography of Cui Yin	
Volume 53	卷五十三 周黃徐姜申屠列傳 第四十三	Biographies of Zhou, Huang, Xu, Jiang, Shentu	Zhou Xie (周燮); Huang Xian (黃憲); Xu Zhi (徐稺); Jiang Gong (姜肱); Shentu Pan (申屠蟠)
Volume 54	卷五十四 楊震列傳 第四十四	Biography of Yang Zhen	
Volume 55	卷五十五 章帝八王傳 第四十五	Biographies of Eight Princes of Emperor Zhang	Liu Kang (劉伉); Liu Quan (劉全); Liu Qing; Liu Shou (劉壽); Liu Kai (劉開); Liu Shu (劉淑); Liu Wansui (劉萬歳); Liu Sheng (劉勝)
Volume 56	卷五十六 張王種陳列傳 第四十六	Biographies of Zhang, Wang, Zhong, Chen	Zhang Hao (張晧); Wang Gong (王龔); Zhong Gao (種暠); Chen Qiu (陳球)
Volume 57	卷五十七 杜欒劉李劉謝列傳 第四十七	Biographies of Du, Luan, Liu, Li, Liu, Xie	Du Gen (杜根); Luan Ba (欒巴); Liu Tao (劉陶); Li Yun (李雲); Liu Yu (劉瑜); Xie Bi (謝弼)
Volume 58	卷五十八 虞傅蓋臧列傳 第四十八	Biographies of Yu, Fu, Gai, Zang	Yu Xu (虞詡); Fu Xie (傅燮); Gai Xun (蓋勳); Zang Hong (臧洪)
Volume 59	卷五十九 張衡列傳 第四十九	Biography of Zhang Heng	
Volume 60 (Part 1)	卷六十上 馬融列傳 第五十上	Biography of Ma Rong	
Volume 60 (Part 2)	卷六十下 蔡邕列傳 第五十下	Biography of Cai Yong	
Volume 61	卷六十一 左周黃列傳 第五十一	Biographies of Zuo, Zhou, Huang	Zuo Xiong (左雄); Zhou Ju (周舉); Zhou Xie (周勰); Huang Qiong (黃瓊); Huang Wan (黃琬)
Volume 62	卷六十二 荀韓鍾陳列傳 第五十二	Biographies of Xun, Han, Zhong, Chen	Xun Shu; Xun Shuang; Xun Yue; Han Shao (韓韶); Zhong Hao (鍾皓); Chen Shi (陳寔); Chen Ji (陳紀)
Volume 63	卷六十三 李杜列傳 第五十三	Biographies of Li, Du	Li Gu (李固); Du Qiao (杜喬)
Volume 64	卷六十四 吳延史盧趙列傳 第五十四	Biographies of Wu, Yan, Shi, Lu, Zhao	Wu You (吳祐); Yan Du (延篤); Shi Bi (史弼); Lu Zhi; Zhao Qi
Volume 65	卷六十五 皇甫張段列傳 第五十五	Biographies of Huangfu, Zhang, Duan	Huangfu Gui (皇甫規); Zhang Huan (張奐); Duan Jiong (段熲)
Volume 66	卷六十六 陳王列傳 第五十六	Biographies of Chen, Wang	Chen Fan; Wang Yun
Volume 67	卷六十七 黨錮列傳 第五十七	Biographies of Partisan Prohibitions	Liu Shu (劉淑); Li Ying; Du Mi (杜密); Liu You (劉佑); Wei Lang (魏朗); Xia Fu (夏馥); Zong Ci (宗慈); Ba Su (巴肅); Fan Pang (范滂); Yin Xun (尹勳); Cai Yan (蔡衍); Yang Zhi (羊陟); Zhang Jian (張儉); Cen Zhi (岑晊); Chen Xiang (陳翔); Yuan Kang (苑康); Tan Fu (檀敷); Liu Ru (劉儒); Jia Biao (賈彪); He Yong
Volume 68	卷六十八 郭符許列傳 第五十八	Biographies of Guo, Fu, Xu	Guo Tai (郭泰); Fu Rong (符融); Xu Shao
Volume 69	卷六十九 竇何列傳 第五十九	Biographies of Dou, He	Dou Wu; He Jin
Volume 70	卷七十 鄭孔荀列傳 第六十	Biographies of Zheng, Kong, Xun	Zheng Tai (鄭泰); Kong Rong; Xun Yu
Volume 71	卷七十一 皇甫嵩朱鑈列傳 第六十一	Biographies of Huangfu Song, Zhu Jun	
Volume 72	卷七十二 董卓列傳 第六十二	Biography of Dong Zhuo	
Volume 73	卷七十三 劉虞公孫瓚陶謙列傳 第六十三	Biographies of Liu Yu, Gongsun Zan, Tao Qian	
Volume 74 (Part 1)	卷七十四上 袁紹劉表列傳 第六十四上	Biographies of Yuan Shao, Liu Biao	
Volume 74 (Part 2)	卷七十四下 袁紹劉表列傳 第六十四下	Biographies of Yuan Shao, Liu Biao	
Volume 75	卷七十五 劉焉袁術呂布列傳 第六十五	Biographies of Liu Yan, Yuan Shu, Lü Bu	
Volume 76	卷七十六 循吏列傳 第六十六	Biographies of Upright Officials	Wei Sa (衛颯); Wang Jing (王景); Qin Peng (秦彭); Wang Huan (王渙); Xu Jing (許荊); Meng Chang (孟嘗); Diwu Fang (第五訪); Liu Ju (劉矩); Liu Chong (劉寵); Qiu Lan (仇覽); Tong Hui (童恢); Di Yi (弟翊)
Volume 77	卷七十七 酷吏列傳 第六十七	Biographies of Cruel Officials	Dong Xuan (董宣); Fan Ye (樊曄); Li Zhang (李章); Zhou Zi (周錙); Huang Chang (黃昌); Yang Qiu (陽球); Wang Ji (王吉)
Volume 78	卷七十八 宦者列傳 第六十八	Biographies of Eunuchs	Zheng Zhong (鄭眾); Cai Lun; Sun Cheng; Cao Teng; Shan Chao (單超); Hou Lan; Cao Jie; Shen Zhong (審忠); Lü Qiang (呂強); Zhang Rang
Volume 79 (Part 1)	卷七十九上 儒林列傳 第六十九上	Biographies of Confucian Scholars	Liu Kun (劉昆); Zi Die (子軼); Wa Dan (窪丹); Yang Hong (陽鴻); Ren An (任安); Yang Zheng (楊政); Zhang Xing (張興); Dai Ping (戴憑); Wei Man (魏滿); Sun Qi (孫期); Ouyang Xi (歐陽歙); Cao Zeng (曹曾); Song Deng (宋登); Zhang Xun (張馴); Yin Min (尹敏); Zhou Fang (周防); Kong Xi (孔僖); Yang Lun (楊倫)
Volume 79 (Part 2)	卷七十九下 儒林列傳 第六十九下	Biographies of Confucian Scholars	Gao Xu (高詡); Bao Xian (包鹹); Wei Ying (魏應); Fu Gong (伏恭); Ren Mo (任末); Jing Luan (景鸞); Xue Han (薛漢); Du Fu (杜撫); Zhao Xun (召馴); Yang Ren (楊仁); Zhao Ye (趙曄); Shi Shan (時山); Dong Jun (董鈞); Ding Gong (丁恭); Zhou Ze (周澤); Zhang Kan (張堪); Zhong Xing (鐘興); Zhen Yu (甄宇); Lou Wang (樓望); Cheng Zeng (程曾); Zhang Xuan (張玄); Li Yu (李育); He Xiu (何休); Fu Qian (服虔); Ying Rong (穎容); Xie Gai (謝該); Xu Shen; Cai Xuan (蔡玄)
Volume 80 (Part 1)	卷八十上 文苑列傳 第七十上	Biographies of Writers	Du Du (杜篤); Wang Long (王隆); Xia Gong (夏恭); Fu Yi (傅毅); Huang Xiang (黃香); Liu Yi (劉毅); Li You (李尤); Su Shun (蘇順); Liu Zhen (劉珍); Ge Gong (葛龔); Wang Yi (王逸); Cui Qi (崔琦); Bian Shao (邊韶)
Volume 80 (Part 2)	卷八十下 文苑列傳 第七十下	Biographies of Writers	Zhang Sheng (張升); Shi Jun (仕郡); Zhao Yi (趙壹); Liu Liang (劉梁); Bian Rang (邊讓); Li Yan (酈炎); Hou Jin (侯瑾); Gao Biao (高彪); Zhang Chao (張超); Mi Heng
Volume 81	卷八十一 獨行列傳 第七十一	Biographies of Loners	Qiao Xuan (譙玄); Li Ye (李業); Liu Mao (劉茂); Wen Xu (溫序); Peng Xiu (彭修); Suolu Fang (索盧放); Zhou Jia (周嘉); Fan Shi (範式); Li Shan (李善); Wang Tun (王忳); Ling Xu (陵續); Li Chong (李充); Miao Rong (繆肜); Chen Zhong (陳重); Lei Yi (雷義); Fan Ran (范冉); Dai Jiu (戴就); Zhao Bao (趙苞); Xiang Xu (向栩); Liang Fu (諒輔); Liu Yi (劉翊); Wang Lie (王烈)
Volume 82 (Part 1)	卷八十二上 方術列傳 第七十二上	Biographies of Alchemists	Ren Wengong (任文公); Guo Xian (郭憲); Xu Yang (許楊); Gao Huo (高獲); Wang Qiaozhe (王喬者); Xie Yiwu (謝夷吾); Yang You (楊由); Li Nan (李南); Li He (李合); Feng Zhou (馮冑); Duan Yi (段翳); Liao Fu (廖扶); Zhe Xiang (折像); Fan Ying (樊英)
Volume 82 (Part 2)	卷八十二下 方術列傳 第七十二下	Biographies of Alchemists	Tang Tan (唐檀); Gongsha Mu (公沙穆); Xu Man (許曼); Zhao Yan (趙彥); Fan Zhizhang (樊志張); Shan Yang (單揚); Han Shuo (韓說); Dong Fu (董扶); Guo Yu (郭玉); Hua Tuo; Xu Deng (徐登); Fei Changfang (費長房); Ji Zixun (薊子訓); Liu Gen (劉根); Zuo Ci; Ji Zixun (計子勳); Wang Heping (王和平)
Volume 83	卷八十三 逸民列傳 第七十三	Biographies of Hermits	Xiang Chang (向長); Feng Meng (逢萌); Zhou Dang (周黨); Wang Ba (王霸); Yan Guang (嚴光); Jing Dan (井丹); Liang Hong (梁鴻); Gao Feng (高鳳); Tai Tong (台佟); Han Kang (韓康); Jiao Shen (矯慎); Dai Liang (戴良); Fa Zhen (法真); Pang Gong (龐公)
Volume 84	卷八十四 列女傳 第七十四	Biographies of Exemplary Women	
Volume 85	卷八十五 東夷列傳 第七十五	Treatise on the Dongyi	Fuyu; Yilou; Gaojuli; Woju; Huimo; Sanhan; Wo
Volume 86	卷八十六 南蠻西南夷列傳 第七十六	Treatise on the Nanman, Southwestern Barbarians	
Volume 87	卷八十七 西羌傳 第七十七	Treatise on the Western Qiang	Qiang
Volume 88	卷八十八 西域傳 第七十八	Treatise on the Western Regions	Yutian; Tiaozhi; Anxi; Daqin; Yuezhi; Tianzhu; Yancai; Shule; Yanqi; Jushi
Volume 89	卷八十九 南匈奴列傳 第七十九	Treatise on the Southern Xiongnu	
Volume 90	卷九十 烏桓鮮卑列傳 第八十	Treatise on the Wuhuan, Xianbei	

=== Records (志) ===
Notes: (Note: The "eight records" were from the Xu Hanshu compiled by Sima Biao. They were incorporated into Fan's Houhanshu by Liang dynasty scholar Liu Zhao, who wrote a preface to the incorporation/annotation.) (Note: Some editions placed this section before the "biographies" section. Thus, an alternate numbering order would be volumes 11 to 40.)

#	Title	Translation	Notes
Volume 91	第一 律曆上	One: Rhythm and the Calendar Part One	
Volume 92	第二 律曆中	Two: Rhythm and the Calendar Part Two	
Volume 93	第三 律曆下	Three: Rhythm and the Calendar Part Three	
Volume 94	第四 禮儀上	Four: Etiquette Part One	
Volume 95	第五 禮儀中	Five: Etiquette Part Two	
Volume 96	第六 禮儀下	Six: Etiquette Part Three	
Volume 97	第七 祭祀上	Seven: Rituals and Worship Part One	
Volume 98	第八 祭祀中	Eight: Rituals and Worship Part Two	
Volume 99	第九 祭祀下	Nine: Rituals and Worship Part Three	
Volume 100	第十 天文上	Ten: Astronomy Part One	
Volume 101	第十一 天文中	Eleven: Astronomy Part Two	
Volume 102	第十二 天文下	Twelve: Astronomy Part Three	
Volume 103	第十三 五行一	Thirteen: Five Elements Part One	
Volume 104	第十四 五行二	Fourteen: Five Elements Part Two	
Volume 105	第十五 五行三	Fifteen: Five Elements Part Three	
Volume 106	第十六 五行四	Sixteen: Five Elements Part Four	
Volume 107	第十七 五行五	Seventeen: Five Elements Part Five	
Volume 108	第十八 五行六	Eighteen: Five Elements Part Six	
Volume 109	第十九 郡國一	Nineteen: Commanderies and States Part One	
Volume 110	第二十 郡國二	Twenty: Commanderies and States Part Two	
Volume 111	第二十一 郡國三	Twenty One: Commanderies and States Part Three	
Volume 112	第二十二 郡國四	Twenty Two: Commanderies and States Part Four	
Volume 113	第二十三 郡國五	Twenty Three: Commanderies and States Part Five	
Volume 114	第二十四 百官一	Twenty Four: Officials Part One	
Volume 115	第二十五 百官二	Twenty Five: Officials Part Two	
Volume 116	第二十六 百官三	Twenty Six: Officials Part Three	
Volume 117	第二十七 百官四	Twenty Seven: Officials Part Four	
Volume 118	第二十八 百官五	Twenty Eight: Officials Part Five	
Volume 119	第二十九 輿服上	Twenty Nine: Records on Clothing Part One	
Volume 120	第三十 輿服下	Thirty: Records on Clothing Part Two	
