= Empress Jingyin =

1st-century Han dynasty imperial consort

Consort Song 宋貴人
- Born: Unknown
- Died: c.August 82
- Spouse: Emperor Zhang of Han
- Issue: Liu Qing
Posthumous name
- Empress Jingyin (敬隱后)
- Father: Song Yang

Consort Song (died c. August 82), posthumously known as Empress Jingyin (敬隱后; literally "the respectful and hidden empress"), was an imperial consort for Emperor Zhang of the Han dynasty of China. She was a victim in a power struggle at the hands of Emperor Zhang's empress consort, Empress Dou.

Consort Song was the older daughter of Song Yang (宋楊), a seventh-generation descendant of Song Chang (宋昌), an important official during the reign of Emperor Wen. Song Yang was famed for his filial piety. His aunt was the maternal grandmother of Emperor Ming's wife Empress Ma, and Empress Ma, upon hearing that his two daughters were both intelligent and beautiful, selected them as consorts for her adopted son, Crown Prince Liu Da. After Liu Da became emperor in 75 (as Emperor Zhang), both of them became imperial consorts. The elder Consort Song gave birth to a son, Liu Qing, in 78, and because Empress Dou did not have a son, Liu Qing was created crown prince on 23 May 79.

Empress Dou was not satisfied with the situation, however, and in 79, after another imperial consort, Consort Liang, gave birth to a son named Liu Zhao, she adopted Liu Zhao and intended to make him crown prince instead. After Empress Dowager Ma died later that year, Consort Song was left without anyone to protect her, and Empress Dou began to plot her destruction.

In 82, an opportunity came for Empress Dou. Consort Song had become ill, and in her illness, she craved raw cuscuta, and she requested that her family bring them. Empress Dou seized the cuscuta and falsely accused Consort Song of using it for witchcraft. Emperor Zhang was enraged and expelled Liu Qing from the palace. He had Consort Song and her sister arrested and interrogated by the eunuch Cai Lun. Consort Song and her sister saw that they were in deep straits, and they committed suicide by poison c.August 82. Her son Liu Qing would be deposed and replaced by Liu Zhao, who later became Emperor He. After the destruction of the Dou clan in 92 (in which her son Liu Qing had a hand) and Empress Dowager Dou's death in 97, she was posthumously honoured.

On 2 May 121, with her grandson Liu Hu having ascended the throne (as Emperor An), Consort Song was posthumously honoured with the title "Empress Jingyin". However, this was revoked in 190 during the reign of Emperor Xian of Han.
