= Liu Qing (prince) =

Han dynasty prince (78–106)

Prince of Qinghe
- Reign: 1 August 82 - 1 February 107
- Born: 78
- Died: 1 February 107
- Spouse: Lady Geng; Lady Zuo Xiao'e, Empress Xiaode
- Issue: Emperor An of Han; Liu Huwei 劉虎威; Liu Shinan, Princess Nieyang; Liu Biede, Princess Wuyin; Liu Jiuchang, Princess Puyang; Liu Zhide, Princess Pingshi; Liu Jiande, Princess Yincheng
Posthumous name
- Prince Xiao 孝王; Emperor Xiaode 孝德皇
- Father: Emperor Zhang of Han
- Mother: Consort Song

Liu Qing (Chinese: 劉慶; 78 – 1 February 107), formally Prince Xiao of Qinghe (清河孝王) or Emperor Xiaode (孝德皇), was a crown prince of the Han dynasty under his father Emperor Zhang who lost his position and his mother Consort Song due to palace intrigue at the hands of his father's wife Empress Dou. He, however, maintained a strong relationship with his half-brother Emperor He, and was able to avenge himself and his mother in conjunction with his brother. During his lifetime, he saw his son Liu Hu (劉祜) become emperor (as Emperor An) as successor to his nephew Emperor Shang, who died in infancy.

== Family background ==
Liu Qing was born to Emperor Zhang and Consort Song, then one of Emperor Zhang's favourites and also a favourite of Emperor Zhang's mother Empress Dowager Ma, in 78. As Emperor Zhang's wife Empress Dou was sonless, Prince Qing was created crown prince on 23 May 79, while still in infancy.

== Tragedy in childhood ==
Empress Dou was not satisfied with the situation, however, and in 79, after another imperial consort, Consort Liang, gave birth to a son named Liu Zhao (劉肇), she adopted Prince Zhao and intended to make him crown prince instead. After Empress Dowager Ma died later that year, Consort Song was left without anyone to protect her, and Empress Dou began to plot her destruction.

In 82, an opportunity came for Empress Dou. Consort Song had become ill, and in her illness, she craved raw cuscuta, and she requested that her family bring them. Empress Dou seized the cuscuta and falsely accused Consort Song of using it for witchcraft. Emperor Zhang was enraged and expelled Crown Prince Qing from the palace. He had Consort Song and her sister, also an imperial consort, arrested and interrogated by the eunuch Cai Lun. Consort Song and her sister saw that they were in dire straits, and they committed suicide by poison. Crown Prince Qing was deposed and created the Prince of Qinghe instead; he was replaced by Prince Zhao as crown prince. Prince Zhao, however, was friendly to his brother, and they often spent time together.

In April 88, Emperor Zhang died, and Crown Prince Zhao succeeded to the throne as Emperor He. The still-young Prince Qing remained in the capital Luoyang, and he and his emperor brother continued to spend great amounts of time together.

== As his brother's advisor ==
During the first part of Emperor He's reign, the clan of Empress Dowager Dou, particularly her brother Dou Xian, dominated the political scene. That trend continued even as Emperor He grew older and older. Dissatisfied with the autocratic authorities of Dou Xian, Emperor He pondered his options. Apparently encouraged by Prince Qing and the eunuch Zheng Zhong, Emperor He carried out a coup d'état in 92 and toppled the Dous' power. Prince Qing's involvement in the plot is not completely clear but apparently major, and it is speculated that his motivation was to avenge himself (for being deposed) and his mother (for being forced to commit suicide).

After Empress Dowager Dou died in October 97, it was finally revealed that Emperor He was born of Consort Liang. Only at that time did Prince Qing dare to request his half-brother to allow him to rebury his own mother Consort Song. Emperor He agreed and further ordered that Prince Qing be supplied with the proper items to worship his mother posthumously. For the rest of Emperor He's reign, Prince Qing remained in the capital and was a close advisor of Emperor He.

== After Emperor He's death ==
When Emperor He died in February 106, Prince Qing was so saddened by his brother's death that he vomited blood and became seriously ill. While he would recover, his health would be poor for the rest of his life. The fact that he was required to report to his Principality of Qinghe (in modern central Hebei) after his brother's death probably did not help. However, Emperor He's wife Empress Dowager Deng Sui, because Emperor He's son Emperor Shang was still an infant, ordered that Prince Qing's wife Consort Geng and his son Liu Hu (by his concubine Consort Zuo Xiao'e (左小娥)) remain in the capital to serve as a potential successor. When Emperor Shang died later in September 106, instead of making Emperor Shang's older brother Liu Sheng (劉勝) the Prince of Pingyuan emperor, Empress Deng made Prince Hu emperor, as Emperor An, due to her concerns that Prince Sheng would bear a grudge for not having been selected first. Empress Deng sent Consort Geng to Qinghe to join Prince Qing and dominated the government, and there was no sign that Prince Qing had significant input into his son's early reign.

On 1 February 107, Prince Qing died, and at his request was buried next to his mother Consort Song. Later, after Empress Dowager Deng's death on 17 April 121, Emperor An posthumously honored him as Emperor Xiaode on 2 May of that year.

== Family ==
Consorts and Issue:

- Princess consort, of the Geng clan (王妃 耿氏), first cousin
- Empress Xiaode, of the Zuo clan (孝德皇后 左氏)
  - Liu Hu, Emperor Xiao'an (孝安皇帝 劉祜; 94–125), first son
- Unknown
  - Liu Huwei, Prince Qinghemin (清河湣王 劉虎威)
  - Liu Changbao, Prince Guangchuan (廣川王 劉常保; d. 108)
  - Princess Nieyang (涅陽公主), personal name Shinan (侍男)
    - Married Cen Xi, Marquis Wuyang (岑熙)
  - Princess Wuyin (舞陰公主), personal name Biede (別得)
    - Married Deng Bao, Marquis Gaomi (鄧褒), and had issue (two sons)
  - Princess Puyang (濮陽公主), personal name Jiuchang (久長)
    - Married Geng Liang, Marquis Haozhi (耿良), and had issue (one son)
  - Princess Pingshi (平氏公主), personal name Zhide (直得)
    - Married Lai Ding, Marquis Zhengqiang (來定)
  - Princess Yincheng (陰城公主; d. 130), personal name Jiande (堅得)
    - Married Ban Shi of Fufeng, Marquis Dingyuan (扶風 班始; d. 130)
