= Yuanxing =

Yuanxing may refer to:

== Chinese era ==
Yuanxing (元興) was a Chinese era name used by several emperors of China. It may refer to:

- Yuanxing (105), era name used by Emperor He of Han
- Yuanxing (264–265), era name used by Sun Hao, emperor of Eastern Wu
- Yuanxing (402–404), era name used by Emperor An of Jin

== Beef cattle ==
- Yuanxing (beef cattle) (源興牛), an original Tajima strain's breed of Taiwanese beef cattle.
