= Emperor He of Han =

Emperor of the Han dynasty from 88 to 106

Emperor He of Han 漢和帝
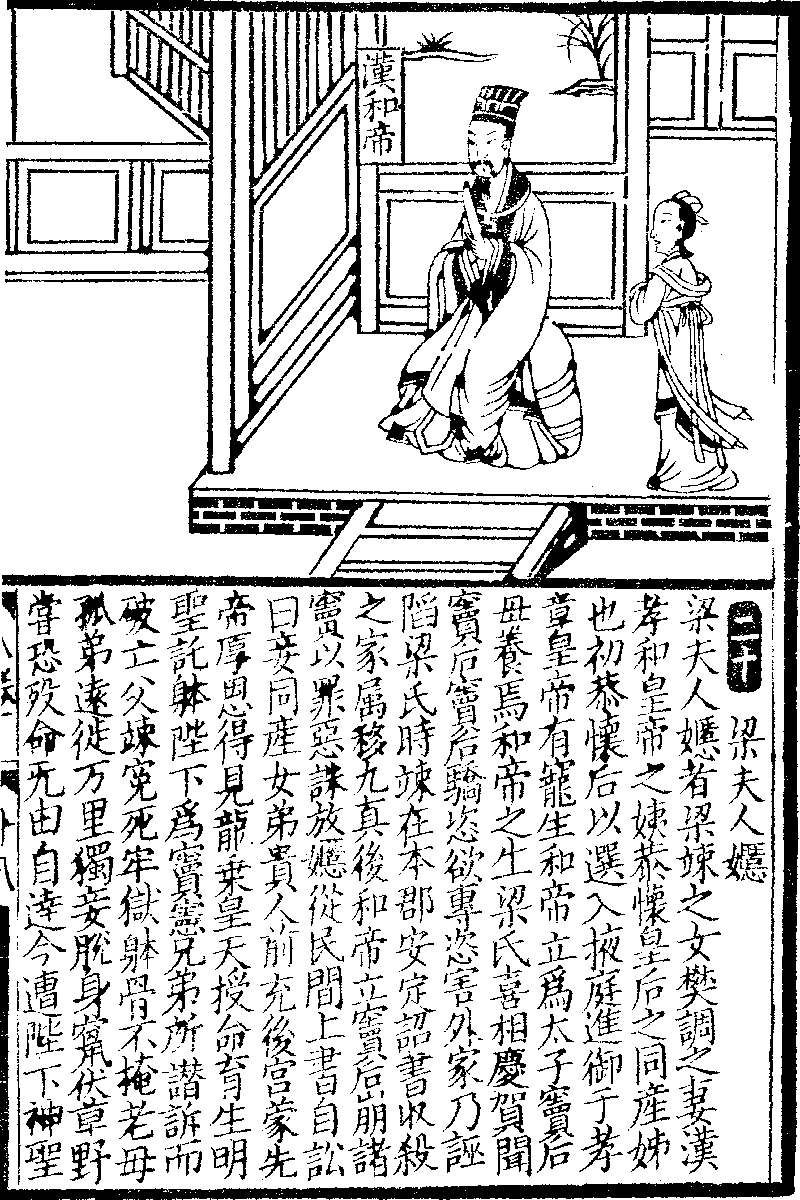
- Emperor He

Emperor of the Han dynasty
- Reign: 9 April 88 – 13 February 106
- Predecessor: Emperor Zhang of Han
- Successor: Emperor Shang of Han
- Born: 79
- Died: 13 February 106 (aged 26)
Names
- Family name: Liu (劉); Given name: Zhao (肇); Courtesy name
Era dates
- Yongyuan (永元): 89–105; Yuanxing (元興): 105
Posthumous name
- Emperor Xiaohe (孝和) (long), Emperor He (和) (short)
Temple name
- Muzong (穆宗)
- Dynasty: Eastern Han
- Father: Emperor Zhang of Han
- Mother: Consort Liang

Emperor He of Han (Chinese: 漢和帝; pinyin: Hàn Hédì; Wade–Giles: Han Ho-ti; 79 – 13 February 106) was the 20th emperor of the Chinese Han dynasty who ruled from 88 to 106. He was the 4th emperor of the Eastern Han.

Emperor He was a son of Emperor Zhang and, the then Empress Dou. He ascended the throne at the age of nine and ruled for 17 years. It was during Emperor He's reign that the Eastern Han dynasty began its decline. Strife between consort clans and eunuchs began when Empress Dowager Dou (Emperor He's adoptive mother) made her own family members important government officials. Her family was corrupt and intolerant of dissension. In 92, Emperor He was able to fix the situation by removing the empress dowager's brothers with the aid of the eunuch Zheng Zhong and his half-brother Liu Qing the Prince of Qinghe. This in turn created a precedent for eunuchs to be involved in important affairs of state. The trend would continue to escalate for the next century, contributing to the eventual end of the Han dynasty in 220. Further, while Qiang revolts, spurred by corrupt and/or oppressive Han officials, started during his father Emperor Zhang's reign, they began to create major problems for the Han during Emperor He's reign and would last until the reign of Emperor Ling.

Emperor He himself appeared to be a kind and gentle man. However, He lacked his father's and grandfather Emperor Ming's acumen for governance and for judgment of character. Although Emperor He's reign arguably began Han's long decline, notable scientific progress was made during this period, including the invention of paper by the eunuch Cai Lun in 105.

One additional trend that started with Emperor He was the lack of imperial heirs - most of Emperor He's sons predeceased him, and at his death He had only two living male children, neither of whom survived long after his death. Whereas many dynasties had succession crises triggered by an emperor's many sons vying to succeed him, in the case of the Eastern Han, the crises were triggered by the lack of direct male line heirs, further adding to dynastic instability.

== Family background ==
Prince Zhao was born to Emperor Zhang and his concubine Consort Liang in 79. Because Emperor Zhang's favourite, Empress Dou, had no sons of her own, she adopted Prince Zhao as her own son; in doing so, she might have been inspired by her mother-in-law, Empress Ma, who had adopted Emperor Zhang, born of Emperor Ming's concubine Consort Jia. By the time Prince Zhao was born, his older brother Liu Qing, born of another concubine, Consort Song, had already been created crown prince. However, Empress Dou dearly wanted to make her adopted son crown prince as well as to eliminate Consort Song and her younger sister, also an imperial consort, as competition for Emperor Zhang's affection.

In 82, an opportunity came for Empress Dou. Consort Song, the mother of Crown Prince Qing, had become ill, and in her illness, she craved raw cuscuta, and she requested that her family bring her some. Empress Dou seized the cuscuta and accused Consort Song and her sister of using it for witchcraft. Emperor Zhang was enraged and expelled Crown Prince Qing from the palace. He had both Consort Song and her sister arrested and interrogated by the eunuch Cai Lun. Following this they committed suicide by poison. Crown Prince Qing was deposed and created the Prince of Qinghe instead; He was replaced by Prince Zhao as crown prince. Prince Zhao, however, was friendly to his brother, and they often spent time together.

The Song sisters would not be Empress Dou's only victims. After Prince Zhao was made crown prince, his birth mother's clan, the Liangs, did not dare to openly celebrate, but were secretly happy. When the Dou clan heard of this, they were displeased and fearful, and they felt that they had to destroy the Liangs. Empress Dou began to give false reports about Prince Zhao's birth mother Consort Liang and her sister, also an imperial consort, and they lost Emperor Zhang's favour. In 83, the Dou clan further submitted anonymous accusations against the father of both Consorts Liang, Liang Song (梁竦), who died in prison. The two Liang sisters died of sadness and fear.

In 88, Emperor Zhang died, and Crown Prince Zhao succeeded to the throne at age nine.

== Early reign under the shadow of the Dous ==
His stepmother and adoptive mother, Empress Dou, who was now Empress Dowager, assumed regency, and the boy Emperor He had no real powers; these powers were in the hands of Empress Dowager Dou, and her brothers Dou Xian, Dou Du (竇篤), Dou Jing (竇景), and Dou Gui (竇瑰). Of her brothers, Dou Gui alone was humble and unassuming, but the other three, particularly Dou Xian, were arrogant, using their connection to the empress dowager to intimidate other officials into submission.

Late in 88, however, a crime that Dou Xian committed threatened to cause even Empress Dowager Dou to want him executed. Liu Chang (劉暢), the Marquess of Duxiang, was favoured by Empress Dowager Dou for his intelligence, and Dou Xian became fearful that Liu will reduce his power and influence. He therefore had Liu assassinated and blamed Liu's brother Liu Gang (劉剛), the Marquess of Li. Several judges who were unafraid of Dou Xian, however, carried out a thorough investigation, and Dou Xian's involvement was discovered. Empress Dowager Dou was enraged, and she put Dou Xian under arrest, and Dou Xian offered to lead an army against the North Xiongnu (Xiongnu having been divided into two since the times of Emperor Guangwu, with South Xiongnu being a loyal vassal and North Xiongnu being a constant nuisance, at most) to atone for his crimes.

Empress Dowager Dou agreed, and Dou Xian led an army and crushed the North Xiongnu in 89. After this great military victory, He became even more arrogant, and regained the support of Empress Dowager Dou. He had another major victory over the North Xiongnu in 91, essentially wiping North Xiongnu out as a political entity. As a result, Dou Xian so dominated the government that all dissenting officials faced the threat of demotion or even death.

== The coup d'etat against the Dous ==
In 92, however, the Dous would suddenly fall as the result of a coup d'etat. The details are unclear, but it appeared that Emperor He, perhaps encouraged by his brother Prince Qing (whose mother had died at the Dous' hand and whose status as crown prince had been stripped away by their machinations) and the eunuch Zheng Zhong (鄭眾).

Based on the traditional historical accounts, some of the Dous' relatives (but not the Dous themselves) had considered murdering the emperor. (The utter lack of motive, however, has led modern historians to generally discredit this assertion.) Emperor He, fearful of being murdered, planned along with Zheng and Liu Qing to destroy the Dous' power. They received some help—in the form of historical accounts that would inspire them as to what to do—from another brother of the emperor, Liu Kang (劉伉), the Prince of Qiancheng.

In the summer, Emperor He made a sudden move, issuing an edict ordering the imperial guards to go on alert and to close the gates of the capital Luoyang. The Dous' relatives who were accused of plotting to murder the emperor were executed. An imperial messenger was sent to seize Dou Xian's seal as the commander of the armed forces. All of the empress dowager's brothers were sent back to their march but under close guard—the emperor wanted to execute them but did not want to do so publicly, so once they returned to their marches, He ordered all of them, except for the more humble Dou Gui, to commit suicide.

== Late reign ==
After the coup d'état against the Dous, Emperor He appeared to actually take power. Empress Dowager Dou lost all power, although He continued to honour her as his mother, apparently having some inkling but not knowing for sure that she was not his birth mother. Prince Qing became a trusted advisor, as did Zheng. This, in turn, created the precedent of palace eunuchs being involved with important matters of state, which would partially contribute to the eventual end of the Han dynasty in 220. In 102, Zheng was created marquess, in an unprecedented action. In the aftermath of the coup d'état, innumerable officials accused of being the Dous' associates were arrested or removed from their posts. The chief among them were the historian Ban Gu, who was a chief assistant of Dou Xian and who had apparently been complicit in Dou's autocracy, as well as the commander of the armed forces Song You (宋由), although Ban Gu's brother Ban Chao was not affected and continued to enjoy imperial support in his Xiyu campaigns. In 97, Ban Chao sent his assistant Gan Ying (甘英) (Kan Ying) on a mission to the Roman Empire—but Gan turned back after reaching an unnamed shore in the Parthian Empire, which might have been the shore of the Persian Gulf—without reaching Rome. In 102, after Ban Chao's retirement, however, mismanagement led the Xiyu kingdoms to rebel against Han authority, and the suzerainty over Xiyu was lost.

The reign of Emperor He was generally one free of major corruption, and the young emperor was himself humble and unassuming. He also appeared to genuinely care for the people. However, He was also undistinguished as an emperor, as He appeared to lack the abilities of his father and grandfather in actively doing what was good for the people.

In 97, Empress Dowager Dou died. It was only at this time that officials revealed to Emperor He that He was born of Consort Liang. He sought out her brothers and honoured them with powerful posts—and from this point on, the Liang clan would become one of the most powerful in the Eastern Han aristocracy. He also posthumously rewarded her with an empress title. However, He rejected a suggestion that Empress Dowager Dou be posthumously demoted, and He buried her with full imperial honours with his father Emperor Zhang. (He also posthumously honoured his brother Prince Qing's mother with lesser honours and awarded her brothers with minor posts.)

=== Issues with the Qiang ===
Qiang rebellions — a persistent problem for the Eastern Han - also took place during Emperor He's reign. (They had first started during his father Emperor Zhang's reign, but were not a major problem until his reign.) In 92, when the official in charge of Qiang affairs, Deng Xun (鄧訓) died, the Qiang had been pacified apparently by Deng's good governing tactics, but after Deng's death, the new official Nie Shang (聶尚) apparently inadvertently offended the Qiang chief Mitang (迷唐), and Mitang rebelled. In 93, the new official in charge of Qiang affairs, Guan You (貫友), was able to defeat Mitang by alienating the other tribes from Mitang's own, but Mitang was not captured and remained a threat. After Guan's death, his successor Shi Chong (史充), indeed, would suffer major losses against Mitang. Mitang, however, would eventually surrender in 98 after running out of allies, and Emperor He in fact received Mitang in an official audience that year. In 100, however, Mitang, suspicious of Han officials' intentions in ordering him to move a long distance—under the rationale that his people were then living on poor soil and the new location provided better opportunities—rebelled again. However, for the rest of his years, Mitang would basically be a nuisance and not a major threat.

=== Marital issues ===
In 96, Emperor He created one of his favourites, Consort Yin—who came from the noble lineage of a brother of Emperor Guangwu's wife, Empress Yin Lihua—empress. She was described as beautiful but short and clumsy, and also jealous. In particular, she became jealous of another of Emperor He's favourites, Consort Deng Sui, who also came from a noble lineage, as a granddaughter of Emperor Guangwu's prime minister Deng Yu (鄧禹). Consort Deng was described to have tried to alleviate this situation by acting humbling before Empress Yin, but this further drew her wrath. Once, when Emperor He was ill, Empress Yin made the remark that if she became empress dowager, the Dengs would be slaughtered—and upon hearing that remark, Consort Deng considered committing suicide, and one of her ladies in waiting saved her by falsely telling her that the emperor had recovered. However, the emperor did soon recover, so Consort Deng and her family escaped a terrible fate.

In 102, Empress Yin and her grandmother, Deng Zhu (鄧朱), were accused of using witchcraft to curse imperial consorts (probably including Consort Deng). Lady Deng and her sons, as well as Empress Yin's brother Yin Fu (陰輔), died under interrogation and torture. Empress Yin was deposed, and her father Yin Gang (陰綱) committed suicide. The rest of her family was exiled. She herself died in sorrow, probably in 102 as well.

After Empress Yin was deposed, Consort Deng was created empress. While she was empress, she constantly rejected Emperor He's offers to promote her brothers, so they did not have much power during Emperor He's reign.

=== Death and succession problems ===
Empress Deng and all of the imperial consorts were sonless for a long time. (Emperor He was described to have had a number of sons who died in young age; it is unclear whether Empresses Yin or Deng ever gave birth, but it appears that they did not.) Late in Emperor He's reign, He had two sons—whose mothers were not mentioned in history—Liu Sheng (劉勝) and Liu Long (劉隆). Under the superstition of the time, it was thought that they might survive better if they grew up outside the palace in light of their other brothers' early deaths, so both were given to foster parents.

In February 106, Emperor He died. At that time, Liu Sheng, the older son, was still young (but actual age is not recorded in history) and believed to be constantly ill. The younger, Liu Long, was only 100 days old. Both were welcomed back to the palace, and Empress Deng created Liu Long crown prince, believing that He would be healthier. On the night of Emperor He's death, Liu Long was proclaimed emperor, as Emperor Shang. On 27 April 106, Emperor He was buried and given the temple name "Muzong".

Emperor Shang would only live to age one, however, and died later in September 106. After Emperor Shang's death, Empress Dowager Deng was apprehensive that Liu Sheng might resent her for not making him emperor first, refused to make him emperor, but made Prince Qing's son Liu Hu (劉祜) emperor, as Emperor An.

In 190, during the reign of Emperor Xian of Han, Emperor He's temple name was revoked.

== Era names ==
- Yongyuan (永元) 89–105
- Yuanxing (元興) 105

== Family ==
- Empress, of the Yin clan (皇后 陰氏; 80–102), third cousin
- Empress Hexi, of the Deng clan (和熹皇后 鄧氏; 81–121), third cousin once removed, personal name Sui (綏)
- Guiren, of the Zhou clan (贵人周氏)
- Guiren, of the Feng clan (贵人馮氏)
- Unknown
  - Liu Sheng, Prince Huai of Pingyuan (平原懷王 劉勝; d. 114), first son
  - Liu Long, Emperor Xiaoshang (孝殤皇帝 劉隆; 105–106), second son
  - Princess Xiuwu (修武公主), personal name Bao (保), first daughter
  - Princess Gongyi (共邑公主), personal name Cheng (成), second daughter
  - Princess Linying (臨潁公主), personal name Li (利), third daughter
    - Married Jia Jian, Marquis Mo (賈建) in 114
  - Princess Wenxi (聞喜公主), personal name Xing (興), fourth daughter

== See also ==
- Family tree of the Han dynasty

Emperor He of Han House of Liu Born: 79 Died: 106
Regnal titles
Preceded by Emperor Zhang of Han	Emperor of China; Eastern Han; 88–106	Succeeded by Emperor Shang of Han
