= Gao Feng =

Gao Feng may refer to:

- Gao Feng (Wentong) (高鳳), style name Wentong (文通), Eastern Han Dynasty hermit, see Book of the Later Han
- Gao Jifu (高季輔; 596–654), formal name Gao Feng (高馮), Tang Dynasty chancellor
- Gao Feng (footballer) (高峰; born 1971), former footballer
- Gao Feng (judoka) (高峰; born 1982), judoka
- Gao Feng (wrestler) (born 1986), freestyle wrestler
- Gao Feng (film director) (born 1956), film director
