= Zheng Zhong =

Zheng Zhong (traditional Chinese: 鄭眾; simplified Chinese: 郑众; pinyin: Zhèng Zhòng), courtesy name Jichan (季產) or Jiping (季平) (died 114), was the first Han dynasty eunuch with real power in government, thanks to the trust that Emperor He had in him for his contributions in overthrowing the clan of Empress Dowager Dou, particularly her autocratic brother Dou Xian. He was also a close associate of Emperor He's wife Empress Deng Sui and continued to be dominant after Emperor He's death, during her regency over his son Emperor Shang and Emperor An. He was also the first Eastern Han dynasty eunuch to be created a marquess. (The only Western Han dynasty eunuch who was created a marquess was Empress Xu Pingjun's father Xu Guanghan (許廣漢), whose creation was thanks to his relationship with his daughter and his son-in-law Emperor Xuan, not his post as a eunuch.)

Zheng was from Nanyang Commandery (roughly modern Nanyang, Henan) – the same commandery that the Eastern Han imperial clan dominated. He was described to be cautious, agile, and a deep thinker. He first served in the household of Liu Da, later Emperor Zhang, while he was still the crown prince under his father Emperor Ming. After Emperor Zhang ascended the throne in 75, Zheng Zhong was appointed as an Attendant at the Yellow Gates,. He was eventually promoted to the post of an imperial attendant (中常侍), and in the early reign of Emperor He (ca.90), he was made Prefect of the Palace Gardens.

During the time of Empress Dowager Dou's regency over Emperor He, Zheng served as the director of imperial gardens (鉤盾令). He was one of the eunuchs who did not endear himself to Empress Dowager Dou's clan. In 92, Emperor He, apparently dissatisfied with his suppression by the Dou clan, plotted a coup d'état with his brother Liu Qing the Prince of Qinghe, and Zheng. They were successful in carrying out the overthrow of the Dous, and as a reward, Emperor He promoted Zheng to the post of the Empress' palace's head of household with the title Grand Prolonger of Autumn (大長秋). Zheng accepted the post but declined most of the monetary rewards that Emperor He gave him, a fact that made Emperor He even more impressed with him. Emperor He often consulted with him on significant affairs of state, and this started a precedent of eunuchs becoming involved in imperial governance.

In 102, breaking past precedent, Emperor He created Zheng the Marquess of Chaoxiang, receiving a revenue from 1,500 households.

Zheng supported Emperor He's wife Empress Deng through the turmoils of Emperor He's death in 106 and the death of his son and successor Emperor Shang later that year. For his support, she added 300 households to his march in 107.

He died in 114, and his adopted son Zheng Hong (鄭閎) inherited his marquisate, which set another new precedent for the titles of court eunuchs.

== Bibliography ==
- de Crespigny, Rafe (2007). A Biographical Dictionary of Later Han to the Three Kingdoms (23–220 AD). Brill. ISBN 978-90-04-15605-0. ISSN 0169-9520.
- de Crespigny, Rafe (2016). Fire over Luoyang: A History of the Later Han Dynasty 23–220 AD. Brill. ISBN 9789004324916.
- "Zheng Zhong 鄭眾". chinaknowledge.de.
