= Guanglie =

Guanglie may refer to:

- Yin Lihua (5–64), posthumous name Empress Guanglie
- An Lushan (703–757), posthumous name Emperor Guanglie
