= Emperor Zhang (disambiguation) =

Emperor Zhang can refer to:

- Emperor Zhang of Han (漢章帝, 56-88), emperor of the Han Dynasty
- Emperor Zhang of Ming (章皇帝, 1399-1435), posthumous name of Xuande Emperor
- Emperor Zhang of Qing (章皇帝, 1638-1661), posthumous name of Shunzhi Emperor
