= Consort Jia =

Consort Jia may refer to:

== Imperial consorts with the surname Jia ==
- Consort Jia (Han dynasty) (fl. 1st century), concubine of Emperor Ming of Han
- Jia Nanfeng (257–300), wife of Emperor Hui of Jin
- Jia Yuanchun, fictional character from Dream of the Red Chamber

== Imperial consorts with the title Consort Jia ==
- Imperial Noble Consort Shujia (1713–1755), concubine of the Qianlong Emperor, known as Concubine Jia or Consort Jia in his harem
- Noble Consort Jia (1816–1890), concubine of the Daoguang Emperor
