= Gao Feng (Wentong) =

Chinese Eastern Han dynasty hermit

Gao Feng (Chinese: 高鳳, fl. 76), courtesy name Wentong (Chinese: 文通), was a Chinese Eastern Han dynasty era scholar and recluse known for his focus on study, righteousness and acceptance of poverty and low status.

He was one of 26 recluses recorded in the Book of the Later Han by Fan Ye, whose father, Marquis Fan Tai, while generally critical of the extremes involved in eremitism, admired Gao's devotion to his principles and acceptance of poverty.

== Life ==
Gao Feng was born to a peasant farming family in Nanyang, but was studious even when young. Later he moved to Mount Xitang (Chinese: 西唐山), about 30 km from present day Tanghe County, where had a school and hundreds of disciples.

Fan Ye tells that his focus on study was so strong that when he was asked by his wife to watch after drying wheat, he agreed but was so engrossed in his reading that rain washed the wheat away. This story inspired the yojijukugo kōhōhyōbaku (高鳳漂麦) meaning to work on one's studies wholeheartedly. In another episode he solved a feud between neighbors by kowtowing.

His wife took care of the practical matters of family life, like working the fields and drying the grains, although Cheng Tan Soon writes that the wheat episode shows that "there existed a real partnership between them inside the domestic household".

He strongly avoided taking an office by claiming that his family members had been shamans, that he was involved in a land dispute with a widow. When Emperor Zhang in 80 CE called for recommendations of men of direct speech, he was recommended by Court Architect Ren Wei but after arriving at the capital Gao claimed illness, returned home and fled into seclusion giving his possessions away to a nephew.
