= Yuanxing (beef cattle) =

- Country of origin: Taiwan
- Distribution: Hualien
- Use: meat

Traits
- Weight: Male: 600 kg; Female: 400 kg
- Coat: black brown
- Horn status: horned in both sexes

Yuanxing (Chinese: 源興牛; pinyin: Yuánxing níu) is an original Tajima strain's breed of Taiwanese beef cattle. This breed was found and purchased by former President of Taiwan Lee Teng-hui from Qingtiangang Grassland in Yangmingshan National Park in 2016, and originally imported from Japanese colonial government. The breed has originally 19 heads of cattle, and is currently raised in Hualien.
