= Empress Zhangde =

Empress of China from 78 to 88 CE

Empress Dou (竇皇后)
- Empress of the Eastern Han dynasty
- Born: c. 63
- Died: 8 October 97 CE (aged c. 34)
- Husband: Emperor Zhang
- House: Eastern Han
- Father: Dou Xun (竇勳)
- Mother: Princess Piyang (沘陽公主)
- Occupation: empress dowager, regent

Empress Dou
- Chinese: 竇皇后
Transcriptions
Standard Mandarin
- Hanyu Pinyin: Dòu Huánghòu
Middle Chinese
- Middle Chinese: dəu^{H} ɦwɑŋ ɦəu^{X}

Alternative Chinese name
- Chinese: 章德皇后
- Literal meaning: "the polite and virtuous empress"
Transcriptions
Standard Mandarin
- Hanyu Pinyin: Zhāngdé Huánghòu
Middle Chinese
- Middle Chinese: t͡ɕɨɐŋ tək̚ ɦwɑŋ ɦəu^{X}

Empress Dou (竇皇后, personal name unknown; c. 63 – 8 October 97 CE), formally Empress Zhangde (章德皇后, literally "the polite and virtuous empress"), was an empress of the Chinese Han dynasty. Her husband was Emperor Zhang. She was already influential and powerful during her husband's reign, but became particularly highly powerful and influential as empress dowager and regent between 88 and 92 for her adoptive son Emperor He after Emperor Zhang's death. Her family members, particularly her brother Dou Xian, became extremely powerful, until they were toppled in a coup d'etat by Emperor He, in 92. Empress Dou lost her power, but remained honored until her death.

== Family background ==
Lady Dou's father Dou Xun (竇勳) was a grandson of the statesman Dou Rong (竇融). Her mother was Princess Piyang (沘陽公主), a daughter of Liu Jiang (劉疆), the Prince of Donghai, who was a highly honored older brother to Emperor Ming and was Emperor Guangwu's first crown prince; therefore, she was created a princess even though her father was not an emperor. Dou Xun was able to marry a princess because the Dous were a powerful noble family at the time, although he himself would eventually be accused of bribing other officials and would die in prison.

== Marriage to Emperor Zhang and palatial intrigue ==
Lady Dou became an imperial consort to Emperor Zhang in 77. She was his favorite, and he created her empress on 3 April 78; he was 22 at the time.

Empress Dou was a jealous woman, and she became engaged in power struggles with other imperial consorts soon after she became empress. She was completely in control of the palace and exercised the power of rewards and punishments stubbornly over the palace.

While Emperor Zhang's adoptive mother Empress Dowager Ma was alive, she selected two daughters of Song Yang (宋楊) as consorts for Emperor Zhang. In 78, the elder Consort Song gave birth to a son named Liu Qing (劉慶), and because Empress Dou was sonless, Prince Qing was created crown prince in 79. The Consorts Song was greatly favored by Empress Dowager Ma until Empress Dowager Ma's death in 79.

Later in 79, however, Empress Dou would (perhaps remembering Empress Dowager Ma's example) adopt the son of another imperial consort, Consort Liang, Liu Zhao (劉肇), as her own son, and she plotted, along with her mother Princess Piyang and her brothers, to have her adopted son made crown prince. After Empress Dowager Ma's death, she put her plan into action. She had her brothers collect dossiers on faults of the Song clan while bribing the servants and eunuchs of Consorts Song to gather their own faults.

In 82, an opportunity came for Empress Dou. The elder Consort Song had become ill, and in her illness, she craved raw cuscuta, and she requested that her family bring them. Empress Dou seized the cuscuta and falsely accused Consort Song of using it for witchcraft. Emperor Zhang was enraged and expelled Crown Prince Qing from the palace. He had the Consorts Song arrested and interrogated by the eunuch Cai Lun. Consorts Song saw that they were in deep straits, and they committed suicide by poison. Crown Prince Qing was deposed and created the Prince of Qinghe instead; he was replaced by Prince Zhao as crown prince. Prince Zhao, however, was friendly to his brother, and they often spent time together.

The Song sisters would not be Empress Dou's only victims. After Prince Zhao was made crown prince, his birth mother's clan, the Liangs, did not dare to openly celebrate but were secretly happy. When the Dou clan heard of this, they were displeased and fearful, and they felt that they had to destroy the Liangs. Empress Dou began to give false reports about Prince Zhao's birth mother Consort Liang and her sister, also an imperial consort, and they lost Emperor Zhang's favor. In 83, the Dous further submitted false anonymous accusations against the Consorts Liang's father Liang Song (梁竦), causing him to die in prison. Consorts Liang died of sadness and fear.

The Dous, having made these powerplays, would eventually gain their goals of becoming even more powerful than they were. Also in 83, Emperor Zhang, having seen that his Ma cousins were not following the law, stopped favoring his Ma uncles, and eventually sent them back to their marches. Empress Dou's brothers Dou Xian and Dou Du (竇篤) effectively took over in the power structure—the first time in Han history that the empress' clan, rather than the empress dowager's clan, was the powerful consort clan. This would be a trend that would recur for the rest of the Eastern Han Dynasty and a source of corruption. In 83, angered by Dou Xian's arrogance, Emperor Zhang threatened to kill him. Empress Dou wore the clothes of concubines and apologized on Dou Xian's behalf, causing Emperor Zhang to spare him.

== As empress dowager and regent ==
In 88, Emperor Zhang died. Crown Prince Zhao succeeded to the throne as Emperor He, at age nine. Empress Dou, now empress dowager, served as regent. Her brothers Dou Xian, Dou Du, Dou Jing (竇景), and Dou Gui (竇瑰) all became powerful officials, even though they had relatively menial titles. Of her brothers, Dou Gui alone was humble and unassuming, but the other three, particularly Dou Xian, were arrogant, using their connection to the empress dowager to intimidate other officials into submission.

Late in 88, however, a crime that Dou Xian committed threatened to cause even Empress Dowager Dou to want him executed. Liu Chang (劉暢), the Marquess of Duxiang, was favored by Empress Dowager Dou for his intelligence, and Dou Xian became fearful that Liu will divide his power. He therefore had Liu assassinated and blamed Liu's brother Liu Gang (劉剛), the Marquess of Li. Several judges who were unafraid of Dou Xian, however, carried out a thorough investigation, and Dou Xian's involvement was discovered. Empress Dowager Dou was enraged, and she put Dou Xian under arrest, and Dou Xian offered to lead an army against the North Xiongnu (Xiongnu having been divided into two since the times of Emperor Guangwu, with South Xiongnu being a loyal vassal and North Xiongnu being a constant nuisance, at most) to atone for his crimes.

Empress Dowager Dou agreed, and Dou Xian led an army and crushed the North Xiongnu in 89. After this great military victory, he became even more arrogant, however—and Empress Dowager Dou permitted him to be. He had another major victory over the North Xiongnu in 91, essentially wiping North Xiongnu out as a political entity. As a result, Dou Xian so dominated the government that all dissenting officials faced the threat of demotion or even death.

In 92, however, the Dous would suddenly fall as the result of a coup d'état. The details are unclear now, but it appeared that Emperor He, perhaps encouraged by his brother Prince Qing (whose mother had died at the Dous' hand and whose status as crown prince had been stripped away by their machinations) and the eunuch Zheng Zhong (鄭眾), made sudden orders to the imperial guards to have them arrest Dou Xian's associates and execute them. He sent Dou Xian and his brothers back to their marches, but eventually ordered them to commit suicide, with the exception of Dou Gui. Empress Dowager Dou remained empress dowager, but lost all power.

== After the fall of the Dou clan ==
Emperor He was unaware that he was not Empress Dowager Dou's biological son, and he continued to honor and respect her, even though not giving her any real authority, after the fall of the Dou brothers. However, after she died in October 97, it became known that he was actually born of Consort Liang. While Emperor He posthumously honored Consort Liang and also rewarded her family with power and wealth subsequently, he rejected a suggestion to posthumously demote Empress Dowager Dou. Instead, she was buried with full imperial honors, with her husband Emperor Zhang.

Chinese royalty
Preceded by Empress Ma	Empress of Eastern Han Dynasty; 78–88	Succeeded by Empress Yin
