= Consort Liang =

1st-century Han dynasty imperial consort

Consort Liang (梁貴人, personal name unknown) (62(?) - 83?), posthumous title Empress Gonghuai (恭懷皇后, literally, "empress of reverent recollection"), was an imperial consort to Emperor Zhang of Han. She gave birth to his son Liu Zhao (劉肇) in 79, but her son was adopted by Emperor Zhang's wife Empress Dou and would not know his birth mother's identity until a long time later, after he became emperor (as Emperor He).

== Life ==
Consort Liang was a daughter of Liang Song (梁竦), a son of one of Emperor Guangwu's officials, Liang Tong (梁統). When she was 15, in 77, both she and her older sister became consort to Emperor Zhang (who was then 20).

At the time Consort Liang's son Prince Zhao was adopted by Empress Dou, Emperor Zhang had already created his son Liu Qing (劉慶), by another favorite, Consort Song, crown prince. Empress Dou made false accusations against Consort Song and her sister (also an imperial consort), however, and the two Consorts Song were forced to commit suicide in 82. Crown Prince Qing was deposed, and Prince Zhao was created crown prince in his stead.

The Liang clan did not dare to celebrate openly, but they were happy about that development. Empress Dou and her clan were not pleased, and, wanting to make sure that the Liangs would not step in and exert influence on the young prince, they also made false accusations against Liang Song, and he was arrested and died in prison in 83. His family was exiled to modern northern Vietnam. Consort Liang and her sister died in sadness, probably in 83 as well. Her son would succeed to the throne in April 88, believing that Empress Dowager Dou was his mother.

After Empress Dowager Dou died in October 97, officials revealed to Emperor He that Consort Liang was actually his birth mother. While Emperor He rejected a recommendation to posthumously demote Empress Dowager Dou, he reburied his mother and aunt with great honors (but not with his father -- that honor was reserved for Empress Dowager Dou, as his father's wife). He also posthumously rewarded his mother the title of empress, with the posthumous name of "Gonghuai". However, this posthumous title was later revoked in 190 during the reign of Emperor Xian of Han.
