= Pang Meng =

Pang Meng (died AD 30) was a Chinese general of the Xin dynasty and early period of the Eastern Han dynasty. He was born in Shanyang Commandery, Yanzhou.

== Biography ==
At first he belonged to the Xiajiang Army of the Green Forest Army. In AD 23, Liu Xuan assumed the position of Emperor Gengshi, Pang Meng was appointed as Jizhou animal husbandry, belonged to Shang Shuling Xie Gong, and defeated general Liu Xiu against Hebei Wang Chang. In AD 24, Liu Xiu slaughtered Xie Gong, and Pang Meng fell to Liu Xiu's subordinates.

In June AD 25, Liu Xiu assumed the position of Emperor Guangwu, appointed Pang Meng as attendant. Pang Meng is humble and meek, trusted and loved by Emperor Guangwu. Emperor Guangwu said: "You can hold the six-foot lonely one, and the one who lives for a hundred miles, Pang Meng is also." Then, Appointed Pang Meng as Pingdi General.

On July 28, the Dong Xian Division of the Prince of Liang Liu Yu camp will take a break and present Lanling (Donghai Commandery) to Eastern Han. Dong Xian Xingbing wanted to recapture Lanling, and Emperor Guangwu ordered Pang Meng and Gai Yan rescued Benxiu. Dong Xian defeated Pang Meng and Gai Yan. As a result, Lanling was retaken by Dong Xian. The Pang Meng mission failed, and there was an unstable atmosphere between Pang Meng and Gai Yan. Emperor Guangwu issued an edict to Gai Yan instead of Pang Meng. Pang Meng thought Gai Yan Emperor Guangwu made a whisper and began to wonder. In March AD 29, Pang Meng killed Chu Commandery Tai Shou Sun Meng, attacked Gai Yan, and attached to Liu Yu camp.

Hearing Pang Meng's rebellion, Emperor Guangwu was furious and scolded Pang Meng the old thief. The pro-raters will recover. Pang Meng was surrounded by Dongping Commandery with the support of Liang Army Su Mao. Emperor Guangwu Army defeated it. Pang Meng fought with Dong Xian in Shandong. Wu Han led the Han army to attack and Pang Meng lost. In February AD 30, Wu Han captured Dong Xian ’s Dong (Donghai Commandery), chased Pang Meng and Dong Xian to Donghai Commandery, and Wu Han ’s captain Han Zhan killed Dong Xian and Fang Yuren ’s Qianling cut Pang meng, sent to the heads of Luoyang.

== Bibliography ==
- 《Book of Later Han》列传2•Pang Meng传、Liu Yong传
- 《Book of Later Han》本紀1上Emperor Guangwu紀上
- Gu Ban and Zhao Ban, 1955. The history of the former Han dynasty - Volume 3.
- Li Shi. Book of Liang, Chen and Wei (Part I) Dynasty
- Rafe de Crespigny, 2006. A Biographical Dictionary of Later Han to the Three Kingdoms (23-220 AD).
