= Consort Jia (Han dynasty) =

Concubine of 1st century Emperor Zhang of Han

Consort Jia (賈貴人; fl.50-79), personal name unknown, was an imperial consort to the Han dynasty's Emperor Ming.

She joined Emperor Ming's harem while he was still crown prince, during the later part of the Jian'wu era of Emperor Guangwu's reign. She gave birth to Prince Liu Da (劉炟), later Emperor Zhang, in 57, while Emperor Ming was still crown prince. At Emperor Ming's direction, his wife Empress Ma, Consort Jia's aunt—her mother's sister—adopted Prince Da as her own son. The eventual Emperor Zhang was aware of Consort Jia's status as his birth mother but never treated her as mother. Even after Empress Dowager Ma died in 79, Emperor Zhang only authorized her to use the style of an imperial prince, never as an empress dowager, and her brothers were not honored as his uncles.
