= Yin Lihua =

Empress of China from 41 to 57 AD

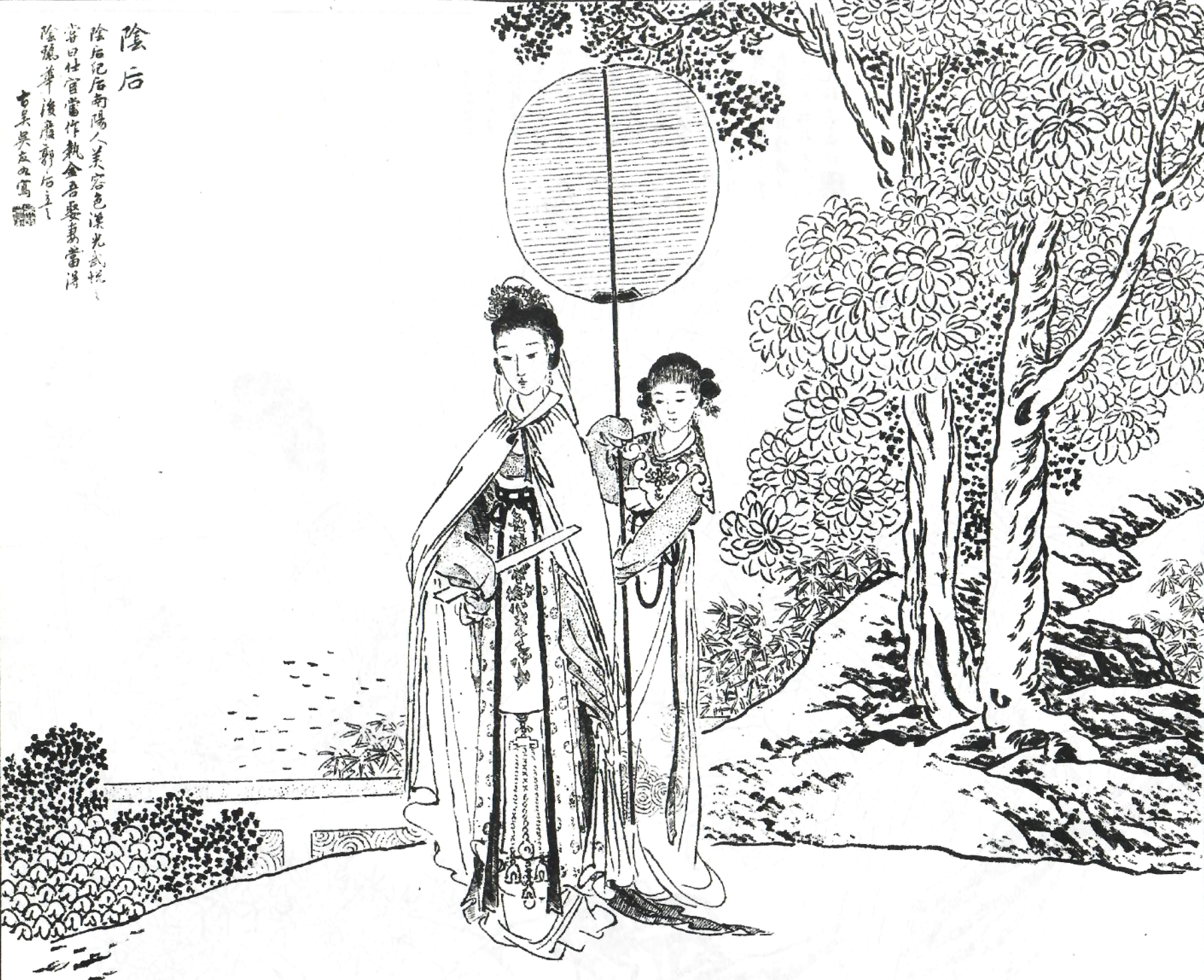

Empress Consort of the Eastern Han Dynasty
- Reign: 41 – 29 March 57 AD
- Predecessor: Empress Guo
- Successor: Empress Ma

Empress Dowager of the Eastern Han Dynasty
- Reign: 29 March 57 – 26 February 64 AD
- Predecessor: None
- Successor: Empress Dowager Ma
- Born: 5 AD
- Died: 64 (aged 58–59)
- Spouse: Emperor Guangwu of Han
- Issue: Emperor Ming of Han
Posthumous name
- Empress Guanglie (Chinese: 光烈 皇后)

Yin Lihua (simplified Chinese: 阴丽花; traditional Chinese: 陰麗華; pinyin: Yīn Lìhuā; 5–26 February 64 AD), formally Empress Guanglie (光烈皇后), was an empress during the Eastern Han dynasty. She was the second empress of her husband Emperor Guangwu (Liu Xiu), even though she was his first wife and married him before his first empress, Guo Shengtong. She was famed for her beauty and meekness. (Her posthumous name started a trend for the rest of the Eastern Han, where empresses' posthumous names were formed not just from their husbands' posthumous names, as was customary during the preceding Western Han, but used part of their husbands' posthumous names along with an additional descriptive character.)

== Family background and marriage to Liu Xiu ==
Yin Lihua was born and grew up in Nanyang Commandery (roughly modern Nanyang, Henan) -- the same commandery that her eventual husband came from. While they were young, he was enamored with her beauty. According to Hou Han Shu, when Liu Xiu was visiting the capital Chang'an, he became impressed with the mayor of the capital (zhijinyu, 執金吾) and, already impressed by Yin's beauty, he made the remarks: "If I were to be an official, I want to be zhijinyu; if I were to marry, I want to marry Yin Lihua".

Yin's father Yin Mu (阴睦) died early when she was six. Her mother's family name was Deng (鄧). She had at least four brothers—Yin Xing (陰興), Yin Jiu (陰就), Yin Shi (陰識), and Yin Xin (陰訢). Yin Xing and Yin Xin were born of the same mother as she; Yin Shi was born of her father's previous wife; it is not clear who was the mother of Yin Jiu. According to Hou Han Shu, the Yins were descended from the famed Spring and Autumn period Qi prime minister Guan Zhong.

In 23, while Liu Xiu was an official in the newly reestablished Han government of Gengshi Emperor, he was married to Yin Lihua. Later, when he was dispatched by Gengshi Emperor to the region north of the Yellow River, she returned home.

== As imperial consort ==
Liu Xiu eventually broke away from Gengshi Emperor, and he proclaimed himself emperor of Han in 25 (as Emperor Guangwu). Later that year, when he captured Luoyang to be his capital, he dispatched subordinates to bring Yin to the capital and made her an imperial consort. At that time, however, he was also married to Guo Shengtong, the niece of the regional warlord Liu Yang (劉楊), the Prince of Zhending, and Guo had given birth to a son, Liu Jiang (劉疆).

In 26, Emperor Guangwu was prepared to create an empress, and he favored his first love, Consort Yin. However, Consort Yin had not yet had a son by that point, and she declined the empress position and endorsed Consort Guo. Emperor Guangwu therefore made Guo empress and her son Prince Jiang crown prince.

In 28, Consort Yin gave birth to her first-born son, Liu Yang (劉陽, not to be confused with Empress Guo's uncle).

In 33, Lady Deng and Yin Xin were killed by robbers. Emperor Guangwu greatly mourned them, and he made Yin Jiu a marquess and tried to make Yin Xing a marquess as well, but the humble Yin Xing declined and further instructed Consort Yin to be always humble and not seeking to honor her relatives. She took the advice to heart.

As imperial consort, even though Consort Yin was not empress, she continued to be favored by Emperor Guangwu as his first love. She (like Empress Guo) bore him five sons.

== As empress ==
By 41, Empress Guo had long lost the emperor's favor. She continuously complained about that fact, and this angered Emperor Guangwu. In 41, he deposed her and made Consort Yin empress instead. Rather than imprisoning Guo (as is often the fate of deposed empresses), however, he made her son Liu Fu (劉輔) the Prince of Zhongshan and made her the Princess Dowager of Zhongshan. He made her brother Guo Kuang (郭況) an important official and, perhaps as a form of alimony, rewarded him with great wealth.

Not having the heart to depose mother and son, Emperor Guangwu initially left Guo's son, Crown Prince Jiang, as crown prince. Crown Prince Jiang, however, realizing that his position was precarious, repeatedly offered to step down. In 43, Emperor Guangwu agreed and Prince Yang, the oldest son of Empress Yin, crown prince instead. He also changed Prince Yang's name to Zhuang (莊).

Empress Yin was not mentioned frequently in history while she was empress—a sign that she was not trying to exert much influence as empress. However, her three brothers all became powerful officials and marquesses, even though they generally were low key and did not seek high offices on their own. She greatly favored former Empress Guo's youngest son Liu Yan, the Prince of Zhongshan, and after Empress Guo died in 52, she treated him as her own son.

Emperor Guangwu died in 57 and was succeeded by Crown Prince Zhuang (as Emperor Ming). Empress Yin received the title of empress dowager.

== As empress dowager ==
Empress Dowager Yin appeared to exert a moderate amount of influence on her son, but far less than past empress dowagers.

In 59, a tragedy would strike Empress Dowager Yin's family. The son of her brother Yin Jiu, the Marquess of Xinyang, Yin Feng (陰豐), had married Liu Xiu's daughter (it is not clear whether she was also Empress Dowager Yin's daughter) Liu Shou (劉綬), the Princess Liyi. Princess Liyi was arrogant and jealous, and Yin Feng, in anger, killed her and was executed. Yin Jiu and his wife then committed suicide. (However, even after this, Yin Jiu continued to be posthumously highly regarded and was praised in a later edict by Empress Dowager Yin's daughter-in-law Empress Ma.)

In 60, at Empress Dowager Yin's endorsement, Emperor Ming created Consort Ma, Ma Yuan's daughter, whom Empress Dowager Yin had favored because of her meekness and lack of jealousy—perhaps because these traits mirrored her own—empress.

Also in 60, Emperor Ming and Empress Dowager Yin made a rare visit to Emperor Guangwu and Empress Dowager Yin's home territory of Nanyang, where they spent days in banquet with Empress Dowager Yin's more distant Deng and Yin relations.

Empress Dowager Yin died in February 64 at the age of 59 and was buried with her husband, Emperor Guangwu.

Chinese royalty
| Preceded by Guo Shengtong | Empress of the Eastern Han dynasty 41–57 | Succeeded by Empress Ma |
