= Guo Shengtong =

Empress of Han China from 26 to 41 CE

Empress consort of the Eastern Han dynasty
- Tenure: 10 July 26 (Note: The wuxu day of the 6th month of the 2nd year of the Jianwu era. Her son Liu Qiang was made Crown Prince on the same day.) – 1 December 41 (Note: The xinsi day of the 10th month of the 17th year of the Jianwu era. Yin Lihua was made empress on the same day.)
- Spouse: Emperor Guangwu of Han (m. 24)
- Issue: Liu Qiang, Prince Gong of Donghai; Liu Fu, Prince Pei; Liu Kang, Prince An of Jinan; Liu Yan, Prince Ji of Fuling; Liu Yan, Prince Jian of Zhongshan
- Father: Guo Chang, Marquess Si of Yin'an

Guo Shengtong (Chinese: 郭聖通; c. AD 6 (Note: Lady Guo's age when she died was not recorded in her biography in the Book of the Later Han. However, her biography did indicate that her brother Guo Kuang was younger than her and was 16 (by East Asian reckoning) in AD 25, the 1st year of the Jianwu era.) – 22 July 52) (Note: The dingmao day of the 6th month of the 28th year of the Jianwu era.) was empress consort of China's Eastern Han dynasty. She was the second wife and first empress of Emperor Guangwu, the founder of the Eastern Han. She eventually lost her Emperor Guangwu's favor and was deposed in AD 41 in favor of his first wife, Yin Lihua. However, both she and her family continued to be respected and honored even after she was deposed.

== Family background and marriage to Liu Xiu ==
Guo Shengtong came from a wealthy family. Her father Guo Chang (郭昌) was a major landowner in the Zhending Commandery (roughly modern Shijiazhuang, Hebei). Her mother was a daughter of Liu Pu (劉普), Prince Gong of Zhending—a hereditary prince descended from the Western Han imperial house, as a sixth generation descendant of Emperor Jing, and she carried the courtesy title of Lady. After Guo's maternal grandfather's death in 7 BC, her uncle Liu Yang (劉楊) inherited the principality. When Wang Mang usurped the Han throne, he was demoted to duke, and the following year demoted to a commoner.

Around AD 23, as Wang Mang's Xin dynasty was crumbling, Liu Yang rose in rebellion and, as his family had hereditary authority in Zhending, the people followed him, and he reclaimed the title of Prince of Zhending. He became a regional power in his principality and nearby commanderies. He nominally submitted to Gengshi Emperor. When the pretender Wang Lang, claiming to be a son of Emperor Cheng (with the name Liu Ziyu (劉子輿)) rose against Gengshi Emperor in late 23, Prince Yang supported his claim. In 24 CE, however, as Liu Xiu, still an official under Gengshi Emperor, was trying to pacify the region, he engaged in talks with Liu Yang, and they reached an alliance, under which Liu Xiu took Liu Yang's niece Guo in marriage. (Liu Xiu was already married to Yin Lihua at the time, and it is not clear what Guo's status was vis-à-vis Yin, although Yin was likely in Liu's and her home territory of Nanyang (modern Nanyang, Henan) at the time, thus avoiding a direct difficult situation.)

In 25 CE, after Liu Xiu proclaimed himself emperor of a restored Han dynasty (as Emperor Guangwu), Guo was created an imperial consort. That year, she gave birth to his first son, Liu Jiang (劉疆). Her position would not change, even though her uncle Liu Yang was suspected of planning a rebellion and killed in 26. Despite that incident, Emperor Guangwu permitted Liu Yang's son and Consort Guo's cousin Liu De (劉得) to inherit the Principality of Zhending, although he would be demoted to marquess in 37 as part of a major reorganization of noble titles.

Also in 26 CE, Emperor Guangwu considered creating an empress. He favored his first love, Consort Yin. However, Consort Yin had not yet had a son by that point, and she declined the empress position and endorsed Consort Guo. Emperor Guangwu therefore created Guo empress and her son Prince Jiang crown prince.

== As empress ==
Empress Guo would be one of the empresses who would give birth to the most princes in Han history (a status she would eventually share with Yin), as she gave birth to five sons. However, as the years went by, Emperor Guangwu continued to favor his first love Consort Yin and not Empress Guo. This is even as he favored her brother Guo Kuang (郭況) as an official and promoted him on a number of occasions. She continuously complained about her lack of favor, which made Emperor Guangwu angry. In 41, he deposed her from her empress position and created Yin empress to replace her.

Empress Guo did not suffer the fate of other deposed empresses in history, however—imprisonment or death. Rather, Emperor Guangwu, who has by that point created his sons only as dukes, promoted her son Liu Fu (劉輔) to Prince of Zhongshan and created her the Princess Dowager of Zhongshan—a title that had not previously been and would not be later used for any mother of an imperial prince whose husband was still alive.

== As princess dowager ==
After Empress Guo was deposed, Emperor Guangwu continued to bestow her family honors as would otherwise befit an empress's family. Her brother Guo Kuang, already a marquess, was bestowed a large march, and given such great wealth that his mansion was nicknamed "the gold mine" by the people of the capital Luoyang. Her cousins Guo Jing (郭竟) and Guo Kuang (郭匡, not to be confused with her brother), for their achievements in Emperor Guangwu's administration, were created marquesses as well, as was her cousin's husband Chen Mao (陳茂).

In 44, Prince Fu's principality was moved to Pei, and Princess Dowager Guo went with him.

In 50, Princess Dowager Guo's mother died, and Emperor Guangwu personally attended her wake and burial. He also posthumously created Guo Chang, Princess Dowager Guo's father, a marquess and had his casket reburied with honors with his wife.

In July 52, Princess Dowager Guo died. She was probably in her 40s and was buried with honors, but not with the honors of an empress nor at Emperor Guangwu's eventual tomb.

== Notes ==
Chinese royalty
New dynasty	Empress of the Eastern Han dynasty 26–41	Succeeded by Empress Yin Lihua
Preceded by Empress Shi of the Xin dynasty	Empress of China; 26–41	Succeeded by Empress Yin Lihua
