= Empress Ma (Han dynasty) =

Empress of China from 60 to 75 CE

- Spouse: Emperor Ming of Han
- Issue: Emperor Zhang of Han (foster son)
- Father: General Ma Yuan
- Mother: Lady Lìn (藺夫人)

Empress Ma (馬皇后, personal name unknown; late 30s (Note: According to Lady Ma's biography in Book of the Later Han, she was in her 40s when she died.) – August 16, 79), formally Empress Mingde (明德皇后, literally, "the understanding and virtuous empress"), was an empress during the Eastern Han dynasty from 8 April 60 (Note: According to Emperor Ming's biography in Book of the Later Han, Lady Ma was made empress on the jiazi day of the 2nd month of the 3rd year of the Yong'ping era of his reign; this corresponds to 8 Apr 60 in the Julian calendar.) until 75, then empress dowager from that year till her death. Her husband was Emperor Ming of Han.

== Family background and marriage to Crown Prince Zhuang ==
The eventual Empress Ma was born to Emperor Guangwu's General Ma Yuan, known for his expeditions against Vietnamese rebellions and his exhortations on personal living, and his wife Lady Lin (藺夫人). Ma was a marquess, and Lady Ma was therefore born into comfort and wealth, as a member of a noble family.

In 49, however, things would change. Ma, while on expedition against the Wulin tribes (Note: in modern eastern Guizhou and northwestern Hunan), died during the campaign from a plague, which also killed a large number of his soldiers. After his death, Ma's deputy Geng Shu (耿舒), who had disagreed with Ma's strategy, and Emperor Guangwu's son-in-law Liang Song (梁松), who had prior grudges against Ma, falsely accused Ma of many crimes—most of which is unknown to us. Two specific accusations that are known are that Ma, by the route he took against the Wulin tribes, was responsible for the plague, and that he had, while on campaigns, embezzled pearls and rhinoceros horns. (Note: The later accusation was a misunderstanding in that one of Ma's favorite foods—which he considered capable of warding off plagues—was Job's tears (Chinese pearl barley), which was produced in southern China and northern Vietnam, which Ma had transported in large quantities back to the capital Luoyang.) Guangwu believed these false accusations and posthumously stripped Ma of his marquess title and fief, thus depriving the Ma family of its major source of income.

The other noble families began to look down on the Ma family. Lady Ma had been previously engaged to marry a son of another noble family, the Dous. The Dous began to have second thoughts of the marriage, believing that Lady Ma was no longer worthy to marry their son. Ma's cousin Ma Yan (馬嚴) and mother Lady Lin were angered by the Dous' attitude, and resolved to dissolve the engagement and offer Lady Ma to Crown Prince Liu Zhuang as a consort instead.

== As consort to the crown prince ==
As a consort to the crown prince, Consort Ma was described to be excellent at serving her mother-in-law, Empress Yin Lihua, and she quickly became Empress Yin's favorite. She was also cordial and warm to her fellow consorts. As a result, she also became a favorite of Crown Prince Zhuang. One of her virtues was said to be her willingness, or indeed, eagerness, to find appropriate beautiful ladies in waiting for Crown Prince Zhuang to have sexual relations with, because at that point Crown Prince Zhuang had not had many sons.

Consort Ma herself was childless. Her older sister's daughter, Consort Jia, was also a consort to the crown prince, and Consort Jia bore a son named Liu Da (劉炟). Crown Prince Zhuang instructed Consort Ma to adopt Prince Da as her son, and she did so. She raised him so carefully and lovingly that he never regarded anyone but her as his mother.

== As empress consort ==
In 57, Emperor Guangwu died, and Crown Prince Zhuang ascended the throne as Emperor Ming. Consort Ma became an imperial consort. In 60, he created her empress and created Prince Da crown prince.

As empress, Empress Ma was described as humble and solemn, and she loved reading. She often wore the less expensive white silk without elaborate designs. The imperial consorts and princesses were all surprised by how thrifty she was and yet impressed by her. Emperor Ming often consulted her on important matters of state when he could not make a decision quickly. She would analyze the issues carefully and come up with good suggestions. When Emperor Ming resolved dilemmas with her help, he tried to consult her even more on other important matters of governance, but she refused to more speak and make suggestions and supported Emperor Ming's own opinions. One thing she was described of having never done was to request favors for her brothers and cousins. Because of this, Emperor Ming continued to respect and trust and love her.

In 71, as mass tortures and executions were being carried out as a result of a conspiracy engaged in by Emperor Ming's brother Liu Ying, the Prince of Chu, Empress Ma interceded on the accused people's behalf, and as a result, Emperor Ming tapered off on his efforts to eliminate anyone who might be even remotely connected with the conspiracy.

In 72, when Emperor Ming created his sons princes, he gave them relatively small principalities. Empress Ma objected—she did not understand why these principalities were only half as large as the ones for Emperor Guangwu's sons. Emperor Ming responded that of course his sons could not be compared with his father's sons—a response that she would remember and agree with.

On 5 September 75, Emperor Ming died, and Crown Prince Da ascended the throne as Emperor Zhang. Empress Ma became empress dowager on the same day.

== As empress dowager ==
Empress Dowager Ma continued to be known for her humility and good judgment as empress dowager. Emperor Zhang, like his father, turned to her when he was in a dilemma about important government issues, to decide the issue with her advice or her approval in the decision he wanted to make. Emperor Zhang, who was close to his uncles—Empress Dowager Ma's brothers Ma Liao (馬廖), Ma Fang (馬防), and Ma Guang (馬光)—wanted to promote them quickly, but Empress Dowager Ma did not urge it. They did all become important court officials, however. In 77, when Emperor Zhang wanted to further create his uncles marquesses, Empress Ma refused, and issued an edict stating that—just as how Emperor Ming had told her that his sons could not be compared with his father's sons—the Mas could not be compared with the Yins and the Guos (Note: the family of Emperor Guangwu's first empress Guo Shengtong). She further ordered the local governments not to accept improper requests from the Ma family. If there were members of Ma or other closely related families who live exuberantly, Empress Dowager Ma would remove their names from the rolls of the nobles and exile them.

Empress Dowager Ma also established a textile factory and a mulberry garden for silkworms, which became a fairly productive industry for the imperial household. In her spare time, she often discussed important matters of state with Emperor Zhang and taught his sons the Confucian classics – particularly the Analects of Confucius.

In 79, over Empress Dowager Ma's objection, Emperor Zhang created his uncles marquesses. However, under pressure from the empress dowager, the new marquesses, after their requests to decline the fiefs were denied by Emperor Zhang, resigned their government posts. In August that year, Empress Dowager Ma died; she was in her 40s. She was buried with her husband.

== Notes ==
Chinese royalty
Preceded by Empress Yin Lihua	Empress of the Eastern Han dynasty 60–75	Succeeded by Empress Dou
