= Emperor Zhang of Han =

Emperor of China from 75 to 88

Emperor Zhang of Han 漢章帝
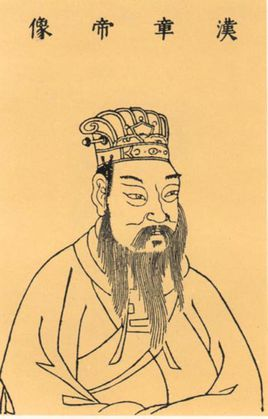
- Portrait of Emperor Zhang from Sancai Tuhui

Emperor of the Han dynasty
- Reign: 5 September 75 – 9 April 88
- Predecessor: Emperor Ming
- Successor: Emperor He
- Born: 56
- Died: 9 April 88 (aged 32)
- Consorts: Empress Zhangde; Empress Gonghuai; Consort Song
- Issue Detail: Emperor He; Liu Qing
Posthumous name
- Short: Zhang (章); Full: Xiaozhang (孝章)
- House: House of Liu
- Dynasty: Han dynasty
- Father: Emperor Ming
- Mother: Consort Jia

Emperor Zhang of Han
- Traditional Chinese: 漢章帝
- Simplified Chinese: 汉章帝
Transcriptions
Standard Mandarin
- Hanyu Pinyin: Hàn Zhāngdì
- Wade–Giles: Han Chang-ti
Yue: Cantonese
- Yale Romanization: Hon Jēung-dai
- Jyutping: Hon3 Zoeng1 dai3
Southern Min
- Hokkien POJ: Hàn Tsiong-tè

Alternative Chinese name
- Traditional Chinese: 劉炟
- Simplified Chinese: 刘炟
- Literal meaning: (personal name)
Transcriptions
Standard Mandarin
- Hanyu Pinyin: Liú Dá
- Wade–Giles: Liu Ta
Yue: Cantonese
- Yale Romanization: Làuh Tat
- Jyutping: Lau4 Tat3
Southern Min
- Hokkien POJ: Lâu Tat

Emperor Zhang of Han (Chinese: 漢章帝; pinyin: Hàn Zhāngdì; Wade–Giles: Han Chang-ti; 56 – 9 April 88), born Liu Da (劉炟), was the 19th emperor of the Chinese Han dynasty from 75 to 88. He was the third emperor of the Eastern Han.

Emperor Zhang was a hard-working and diligent emperor. He reduced taxes and paid close attention to all affairs of state. Zhang also reduced government spending as well as promoted Confucianism. As a result, Han society prospered and its culture flourished during this period. Along with his father Emperor Ming, Emperor Zhang's reign has been highly praised and was regarded as the golden age of the Eastern Han period, and their reigns are collectively known as the Rule of Ming and Zhang.

During his reign, Chinese troops under the leadership of General Ban Chao progressed far west while in pursuit of Xiongnu insurgents harassing the trade routes now collectively known as the Silk Road.

The Eastern Han dynasty, after Emperor Zhang, would be plagued with internal strife between royal factions and eunuchs struggling for power. The people for the coming century and a half would yearn for the good days of Emperors Ming and Zhang. (Note: However, part of the strife came from the power obtained by consort kin, and the precedent was set by Emperor Zhang's bestowing of power on both his adoptive mother Empress Dowager Ma's clan and his wife Empress Dou's clan.) The strife between the eunuchs and royal factions would start a chain reaction of events that led to the end of the Han dynasty in 220.

== Family background ==
Then-Prince Da was born to then-Crown Prince Liu Zhuang and one of his consorts, Consort Jia, in 56. As Crown Prince Zhang's favorite Consort Ma (Note: Consort Jia's maternal aunt (her mother's sister)) had no sons, so on Crown Prince Zhang's instruction, Consort Ma adopted Prince Da as her own son. Prince Da therefore grew up considering Consort Ma as his mother, and while he clearly knew that Consort Jia was his birth mother, he never treated her as his mother.

In 57, Prince Da's grandfather Emperor Guangwu died, and his father Crown Prince Zhuang succeeded to the throne as Emperor Ming. On 8 April 60, at the behest of his mother Empress Dowager Yin Lihua, (Note: Lady Yin herself would die about four years later, in February 64.) Emperor Ming made Consort Ma empress, and Prince Da, as her son, was made crown prince, even though he had four brothers who were older than he was.

== As crown prince ==
Not much was recorded about Crown Prince Da's career as crown prince, other than he was taught of the Confucian classics at a young age and was encouraged in his studies by his adoptive mother, Empress Ma, with whom he had a close relation. He was also close to his uncles of the Ma clan.

In 75, Emperor Ming died, and Crown Prince Da succeeded to the throne as Emperor Zhang at the age of 18. Empress Ma received the title of empress dowager.

== Early reign ==
Emperor Zhang continued his father's hardworking tendencies as emperor, but he was more lenient than his strict father. He sought out honest officials and promoted them, and he himself lived thriftily. He was generally humble and honored the senior officials who had served his grandfather and father faithfully in accordance.

In 76, at the suggestion of his advisor Yang Zhong (楊終) and prime minister Diwu Lun (第五倫), Emperor Zhang ordered that his father's Xiyu (modern Xinjiang and former Soviet central Asia) campaigns be abandoned. However, one of the Han generals in Xiyu, Ban Chao, seeing the importance of maintaining Han presence in Xiyu, refused to withdraw, and Emperor Zhang eventually relented and put Ban in charge of Han's operations in Xiyu.

Being close to his Ma uncles, Emperor Zhang wanted to create them marquesses from the early start of his reign. This was initially rebuffed by Empress Dowager Ma, who found this inappropriate. In 79, however, he created them marquesses over her objection and over their requests to only be made acting marquesses.

In 77, Emperor Zhang took a daughter of his cousin, the Princess Piyang (沘陽公主), and great-granddaughter of the statesman Dou Rong (竇融), as consort. He greatly loved her, and in 78, he created Consort Dou empress.

In 79, Empress Dowager Ma, who had given him much good counsel, died. Even after her death, Emperor Zhang did not honor his birth mother Consort Jia as his mother, but merely permitted her to take on the style of an imperial prince.

== Palace intrigue ==
After his mother's death, Emperor Zhang continued to be a diligent emperor, but within the palace, there was much struggle between Empress Dou and the other imperial consorts, which would create political instability down the line.

While Empress Dowager Ma was alive, she selected two daughters of Song Yang (宋楊) as consorts for Emperor Zhang. In 78, the elder Consort Song gave birth to a son named Liu Qing, and because Empress Dou was sonless, Prince Qing was made crown prince on the recommendation of Empress Dowager Ma in 79 . The Consorts Song were greatly favored by Empress Dowager Ma.

Later in 79, however, Empress Dou would (perhaps remembering Empress Dowager Ma's example) adopt the son of another imperial consort, Consort Liang, Liu Zhao, as her own son, and she plotted, along with her mother Princess Piyang and her brothers, to have her adopted son made crown prince. After Empress Dowager Ma's death, she put her plan into action. She had her brothers collect dossiers on faults of the Song clan while bribing the servants and eunuchs of Consorts Song to gather their own faults.

In 82, an opportunity came for Empress Dou. The elder Consort Song had become ill, and in her illness, she craved raw cuscuta, and she requested that her family bring them. Empress Dou seized the cuscuta and falsely accused Consort Song of using it for witchcraft. Emperor Zhang was enraged and expelled Crown Prince Qing from the palace. He had the Consorts Song arrested and interrogated by the eunuch Cai Lun. The Consorts Song saw that they were in deep straits, and they committed suicide by poison. Crown Prince Qing was deposed and created the Prince of Qinghe instead; he was replaced by Prince Zhao as crown prince. Prince Zhao, however, was friendly to his brother, and they often spent time together.

The Song sisters would not be Empress Dou's only victims. After Prince Zhao was made crown prince, his birth mother's clan, the Liangs, did not dare to openly celebrate, but were secretly happy. When the Dou clan heard of this, they were displeased and fearful, and they felt that they had to destroy the Liangs. Empress Dou began to give false reports about Prince Zhao's birth mother, Consort Liang, and her sister, also an imperial consort, and they lost Emperor Zhang's favor. In 83, the Dous further submitted false anonymous accusations against the Consorts Liang's father Liang Song (梁竦), causing him to die in prison. The Consorts Liang died of sadness and fear.

The Dous, having made these power play, would eventually gain their goals of becoming even more powerful than they were. Also in 83, Emperor Zhang, having seen that his Ma cousins were not following the law, stopped favoring his Ma uncles, and eventually sent them back to their marches. Empress Dou's brothers Dou Xian and Dou Du (竇篤) effectively took over in the power structure – the first time in Han history that the empress' clan, rather than the empress dowager's clan, was the most powerful consort clan. This trend held sway for the rest of Eastern Han dynasty and would prove to be a source of corruption. In short, the Dou clan were the recipients of special favor and affection; rewards and grants were bestowed upon them repeatedly, and their prestige and status increased day by day, to such an extent that among the imperial princes, princesses, and even great aristocratic families such as the Yin clan and the Ma clan, there was no one who did not fear them. Empress Dou enjoyed particular favor, and her position within the women’s court (the inner palace) was firmly and exclusively secured.

== Late reign ==
However, Emperor Zhang himself remained fairly diligent and open-minded. For example, in 84, when two university students, Kong Xi (孔僖) and Cui Yin (崔駰) were accused of improperly criticizing his ancestor Emperor Wu and, by criticizing Emperor Wu, making veiled criticism of Emperor Zhang, Emperor Zhang accepted the letter that Kong submitted in his own defense and made him an official in his administration.

In 86, the first of the Qiang (羌) rebellions began, and while the Qiang were pacified fairly quickly, this would be bad omen for the decades to come, as the Qiang, mistreated frequently by Han officials, would constantly rebel throughout the rest of the Eastern Han dynasty and become a major factor in the decline of the Han Empire.

In 88, Emperor Zhang died at the age of 32 and was succeeded by Crown Prince Zhao, who became Emperor He.

== Era names ==
- Jianchu (建初) 76–84
- Yuanhe (元和) 84–87
- Zhanghe (章和) 87–88

== Family ==
- Empress Zhangde, of the Dou clan of Fufeng (章德皇后 扶風竇氏; d. 97), first cousin once removed
- Empress Gonghuai, of the Liang clan of Anding (恭懷皇后 安定梁氏; 61–83)
  - Liu Zhao, Emperor Xiaohe (孝和皇帝 劉肇; 79–106), fourth son
- Empress Jingyin, of the Song clan (敬隱皇后 宋氏; 58–78)
  - Liu Qing, Emperor Xiaode (孝德皇 劉慶; 78–106), third son
- Guiren, of the Shen clan (貴人 申氏)
  - Liu Shou, Prince Hui of Jibei (濟北惠王 劉壽; d. 120), fifth son
  - Liu Kai, Emperor Xiaomu (孝穆皇 劉開; d. 131), sixth son
- Unknown
  - Liu Kang, Prince Zhen of Qiancheng (千乘貞王 劉伉; d. 93), first son
  - Liu Quan, Prince Dao of Pingchun (平春悼王 劉全; d. 79), second son
  - Liu Shu, Prince Huai of Chengyang (城陽懷王 劉淑; d. 94), seventh son
  - Liu Wansui, Prince Shang of Guangzong (廣宗殤王 劉萬歲; d. 90), eighth son
  - Princess Wude (武德公主), personal name Nan (男), first daughter
  - Princess Pingyi (平邑公主), personal name Wang (王), second daughter
    - Married Feng You (馮由)
  - Princess Yin'an (陰安公主), personal name Ji (吉), third daughter

== See also ==
- Family tree of the Han dynasty

== Notes ==
Emperor Zhang of Han House of Liu Born: 56 Died: 88
Regnal titles
Preceded by Emperor Ming of Han	Emperor of China; Eastern Han; 75–88	Succeeded by Emperor He of Han
