= Emperor Ming of Han =

Emperor of China from 57 to 75 AD

Emperor Ming of Han 漢明帝
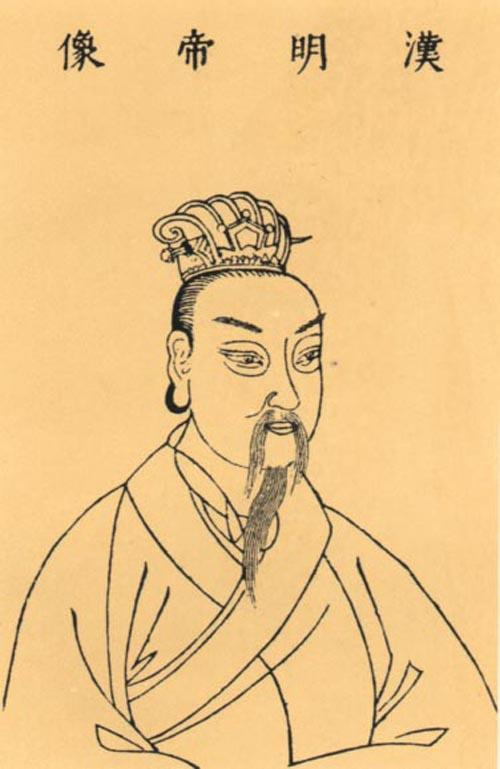
- Artist's conception of Emperor Ming by an unknown artist, published 1609 in a Chinese reference book, Sancai Tuhui.

Emperor of the Han dynasty
- Reign: 29 March 57 AD – 5 September 75 AD
- Predecessor: Emperor Guangwu
- Successor: Emperor Zhang
- Born: 15 June 28 AD
- Died: 5 September 75 AD (aged 47)
- Consorts: Empress Mingde; Consort Jia
- Issue Detail: Emperor Zhang
Names
- Family name: Liu (劉); Given name: Yang (陽), then Zhuang (莊)
Era dates
- Yongping (永平): 57–75 AD
Posthumous name
- Emperor Xiaoming (孝明皇帝) (long) Emperor Ming (汉明帝) (short)
Temple name
- Xianzong (顯宗)
- House: House of Liu
- Dynasty: Han dynasty
- Father: Emperor Guangwu
- Mother: Empress Guanglie

Emperor Ming of Han
- Traditional Chinese: 漢明帝
- Simplified Chinese: 汉明帝
- Literal meaning: Bright Emperor of the Han
Transcriptions
Standard Mandarin
- Hanyu Pinyin: Hàn Míngdì
- Wade–Giles: Han Ming-ti

Emperor Ming of Han (15 June 28 – 5 September 75 AD), courtesy name Zili (子麗; Zǐlì), born Liu Yang and also known as Liu Zhuang and as Han Mingdi, was the 18th emperor of the Han dynasty and the second emperor of the Eastern Han dynasty.

He was the fourth son and second crown prince of Emperor Guangwu. It was during Emperor Ming's reign that Buddhism began to spread into China.

Emperor Ming was a hard-working, competent administrator of the empire who showed integrity and demanded integrity from his officials. He also extended Chinese control over the Tarim Basin and eradicated the Xiongnu influence there, through the conquests of his general Ban Chao.

The reigns of Emperor Ming and his son Emperor Zhang were typically considered the golden age of the Eastern Han Empire and known as the Rule of Ming and Zhang.

== Family background ==
Liu Yang was born in AD 28 to Emperor Guangwu and his first love, Consort Yin Lihua. When Emperor Guangwu was still an official under the Gengshi Emperor, he married Yin in 23. After he became emperor in 25, had wanted to make her empress, but she declined because she had no sons at that point. Instead, she endorsed Consort Guo, who already had a son in Liu Jiang (劉疆), so Emperor Guangwu made Consort Guo empress and Prince Jiang crown prince in 26. However, Prince Yang's birth in AD 28 was still considered a major event.

== From Dukedom of Donghai to crown prince ==
In AD 39, Emperor Guangwu crowned all of his sons, other than Crown Prince Jiang, dukes, and Prince Yang was made the Duke of Donghai. He quickly became known for his intelligence even in his young age, and he often made quick judgments of situations that turned out to be correct. Emperor Guangwu became very impressed with him.

At the age of 41, Empress Guo had lost the emperor's favor, and her constant complaints angered Emperor Guangwu. In AD 41, he deposed her and made Duke Yang's mother Consort Yin empress instead. All of the imperial dukes were promoted to princes to accommodate Emperor Guangwu's new title for Empress Guo—Princess Dowager of Zhongshan (after appointing her son Liu Fu (劉輔) the Prince of Zhongshan); Duke Yang was made the Prince of Donghai.

After Empress Guo was deposed, her son, Crown Prince Jiang, became concerned about remaining crown prince, and repeatedly made requests to be replaced. Emperor Guangwu was initially hesitant to depose of both the mother and son, but in 43, he resolved the situation by switching Princes Jiang's and Yang's positions. He made Prince Jiang the Prince of Donghai, and made Prince Yang crown prince. At this time, he also changed Prince Yang's name to Zhuang, perhaps because Yang (which means "sun") is such a commonly used character that the law of naming taboo would cause the people too a lot of trouble. The new name was not without its own problems, and many members of the Zhuang clan were forced to change their names.

In 51, the woman who would eventually become his empress—Consort Ma, the youngest daughter of famed general Ma Yuan—would become a consort of his. At the time she was 12, and he was 23. She would become a favorite of his, but never bore him a son. Her niece (the daughter of her older sister), Consort Jia, also a consort of Crown Prince Zhuang, did give birth to a child—Liu Da (劉炟). So consort Ma adopted Consort Jia's son as her own.

As crown prince, Zhuang was often requested by Emperor Guangwu to render opinions in important matters. In AD 51, he was involved in making a correct major decision in Han's relationship with Xiongnu. By that point, the Xiongnu had a civil war and divided themselves into two sides, with the Northern Xiongnu ruled by Punu Chanyu (蒲奴) and the Southern Xiongnu ruled by Bi Chanyu (比). Han had become allied with the Southern Xiongnu, and in response, Punu Chanyu, also wanting peace with Han, requested a heqin marriage. Prince Zhuang suggested that Emperor Guangwu refuse the proposal, reasoning that Northern Xiongnu had only made the proposal to alienate Southern Xiongnu from Han. Emperor Guangwu agreed.

In 57, Emperor Guangwu died, and Crown Prince Zhuang succeeded to the throne as Emperor Ming.

== Early reign ==
Due to a naming taboo, people with the surname Zhuang (莊) were forced to change their surname to Yan (嚴).

Emperor Ming quickly established himself as a diligent and capable administrator of the empire. He did many things to try to stamp out corrupt officials, often putting them to death if they were discovered.

One thing traditional historians praised him for was his fair treatment of his brothers by the deposed Empress Guo, treating them as if they were also born of his mother Empress Dowager Yin. In 58, when his older brother, Prince Jiang of Donghai (the former crown prince) died, he ordered that princes and the major officials to attend Prince Jiang's funeral at Lucheng (魯城, in modern Jining, Shandong), a highly unusual honor.

In 59, at the suggestion of his brother Liu Cang (劉蒼) the Prince of Dongping, Emperor Ming instituted a number of Confucian rituals, in which the emperor personally honored the officials who had helped him, to show humility.

In 60, he created his favorite Consort Ma (who was also a favorite of his mother Empress Dowager Yin) empress, and created her adopted son Prince Da crown prince.

The same year, to honour the generals and officials who had assisted his father Emperor Guangwu in re-establishing the Han dynasty, Emperor Ming, perhaps echoing what Emperor Xuan had done, had the portraits of 28 of them drawn on a palace tower (known as the "Yuntai 28 Generals"). Later, four more portraits were added. However, Ma Yuan, because he was the father of the empress, did not receive this honor.

During the early part of his reign, the Northern Xiongnu continued to be a constant threat to both Han and its ally the Southern Xiongnu. Emperor Ming engaged in a variety of military and economic tactics to try to maintain peace with the Northern Xiongnu and was largely successful. In 65, he established a permanent border defense force, known as the Duliao Army (度遼營), in charge of protecting the northern boundaries and the Southern Xiongnu, and also to prevent the people of the Southern Xiongnu from defecting to the Northern Xiongnu.

In 66, in what would eventually evolve into one of the first imperial universities in Chinese history, Emperor Ming built a Confucian school at the capital Luoyang, for the children of high officials and marquesses. The children of Southern Xiongnu nobles also attended.

== Late reign ==
=== The Chu and Huaiyang ===
Emperor Ming was, early in his reign, known for his generosity and affection for his brothers. This, however, apparently caused some of them to engage in behavior that were considered taboo at the time and caused them to be severely punished by Emperor Ming, leading also to two major mass executions that blotted Emperor Ming's reign.

The first of these incidents happened in 66–67 and was relatively bloodless. The ambitious Prince Jing of Guanglin wanted to be emperor, and he plotted with people under him to rebel. When he was informed, he confessed, and Emperor Ming initially spared him and permitted him to remain the Prince of Guanglin but stripped his political powers. However, later Prince Jing hired warlocks to curse Emperor Ming. After he was discovered, Emperor Ming initially took no action, but in 67 forced Prince Jing to commit suicide.

The next incident would not be so bloodless. In 70, Prince Ying of Chu—incidentally, the only son of Emperor Guangwu not born of either of his empresses but of Consort Xu—hired warlocks to create golden turtles and jade cranes, and carved characters calling for unusual blessings on them—a major taboo at the time. Further, he was discovered to have written revolutionary writings. Emperor Ming did not put him to death, but deposed him from his principality, exiled him, and made him a commoner (but with a small fief of 500 households). In 71, Prince Ying committed suicide in exile. However, the investigation did not end. By Emperor Ming's orders, Prince Ying's associates (but not his family) were harshly tortured and interrogated, and anyone that they named as a co-conspirator was arrested and further tortured and interrogated. The interrogators themselves used this opportunity to falsely accuse many others of conspiracy. Tens of thousands of people died, either of torture or execution, during the investigation. Only after Empress Ma's intercession and persuasive petitions by one of the interrogators, Han Lang (寒朗), did the interrogations taper off.

A similar incident happened in 73, when Prince Yan of Huaiyang was informed to have hired warlocks to curse Emperor Ming. Several of Prince Yan's associates were executed, and there were also many others who were executed or exiled after Chu-style interrogations were carried out. Prince Yan himself was not executed, but was demoted from his commandery-level principality to be the Prince of Fulin, with only two counties in his principality.

=== Campaigns against Northern Xiongnu and reassertion of suzerainty over Xiyu ===
In 73, annoyed at Northern Xiongnu's constant incursions against Han, Emperor Ming commissioned his generals Geng Bing (耿秉) and Dou Gu (竇固) to lead a major expedition against Northern Xiongnu. They only had minor successes, but it demonstrated to Northern Xiongnu that Han was now in a position to strike back.

Dou, as part of his campaign, sent his assistant Ban Chao to visit the Xiyu (modern Xinjiang and former Soviet central Asia) kingdom of Shanshan (on the eastern edge of the Taklamakan Desert. (Xiyu kingdoms had long submitted to Northern Xiongnu's authority, and unable to bear the heavy taxes, had often requested that Han step in and reassert suzerainty that had been established during the Western Han Dynasty, starting with Emperor Wu's reign. However, they had been constantly rebuffed by Emperors Guangwu and Ming, who judged Han to be not sufficiently strong to engage in a Xiyu campaign.) Initially, the king of Shanshan was very pleased and welcomed the Han ambassadors as honored guests, but eventually the welcome faded. Ban realized that Northern Xiongnu ambassadors must have arrived. He found out where the Northern Xiongnu ambassadors were, and, in a night raid, massacred the Xiongnu ambassadors. The king of Shanshan was shocked but somewhat pleased, and submitted to Han suzerainty once again.

Emperor Ming promoted Ban and commissioned him to next visit Yutian ("Khotan"), then the strongest kingdom in southern Xiyu, which had a strong alliance with Northern Xiongnu. Guangde (廣德), the King of Yutian, trusted his chief warlock, who demanded Ban's horse. Ban agreed to give him the horse, and then, when the warlock arrived to pick up the horse, immediately executed him, and sent his head back to Guangde. Guangde was impressed and submitted to Han's suzerainty. With Yutian having submitted, the Xiyu kingdoms largely all submitted as well.

In 74, Dou and Geng led a major military expedition against a major remaining ally of the Northern Xiongnu, Cheshi (roughly modern Changji Hui Autonomous Prefecture, Xinjiang). Cheshi submitted, and at Dou's suggestion, the office of the Protector General of Xiyu (都護) was reinstituted. A Northern Xiongnu expedition in 75 to recapture Cheshi was repelled by Geng Gong (耿恭), one of the deputies of the protector general.

=== Death ===
In 75, Emperor Ming died. His will ordered that no temple be built for him, and that he only be worshipped as part of the worship of his mother Empress Dowager Yin. (This became a systematic reform that the rest of the Eastern Han Dynasty emperors largely followed; they did not have separate temples built for themselves, but instead were worshipped along with Emperor Guangwu. This was a major saving compared to the Western Han system of building a separate temple for each emperor.) His son Crown Prince Da succeeded to the throne as Emperor Zhang.

== Era name ==
- Yongping (永平) 58–75

== Family ==
- Empress Mingde, of the Ma clan of Fufeng (39–79)
- Guiren, of the Jia clan (貴人 賈氏)
  - Liu Da, Emperor Xiaozhang (57–88), fifth son
  - Princess Pingyang (平陽公主), personal name Nu (奴), second daughter
    - Married Feng Shun (馮順)
- Guiren, of the Yin clan (貴人 陰氏)
  - Liu Chang, Prince Jie of Liang (梁節王 劉暢; d. 98), seventh son
- Guiren, of the Qin clan (贵人 秦氏)
- Guiren, of the Yan clan (贵人 阎氏)
- Unknown
  - Liu Jian, Prince Ai of Qiancheng (千乘哀王 劉建; d. 61), first son
  - Liu Xian, Prince Jing of Chen (陳敬王 劉羨; d. 97), second son
  - Liu Gong, Prince Jing of Pengcheng (彭城靖王 劉恭; d. 117), third son
  - Liu Dang, Prince Jing of Lecheng (樂成靖王 劉黨; 58–96), fourth son
  - Liu Yan, Prince Hui of Xiapi (下邳惠王 劉衍; 64–126), sixth son
  - Liu Bing, Prince Qing of Huaiyang (淮陽頃王 劉昞; d. 87), eighth son
  - Liu Chang, Prince Dao of Jiyin (濟陰悼王 劉長; d. 84), ninth son
  - Princess Huojia (獲嘉公主), personal name Ji (姬), first daughter
    - Married Feng Zhu, Marquis Yangyi (馮柱), and had issue (one son)
  - Princess Longlü (隆慮公主), personal name Ying (迎), third daughter
    - Married Geng Xi, Marquis Mouping (耿襲)
  - Princess Pingshi (平氏公主), personal name Ci (次), fourth daughter
  - Princess Qinshui (沁水公主), personal name Zhi (致), fifth daughter
    - Married Deng Gan, Marquis Gaomi (鄧乾; d. 95)
  - Princess Pinggao (平皋公主), personal name Xiaoji (小姬), sixth daughter
    - Married Deng Bo, Marquis Chang'an (鄧蕃)
  - Princess Junyi (浚儀公主), personal name Zhong (仲), seventh daughter
    - Married Wang Du, Marquis Yang (王度)
  - Princess Wu'an (武安公主), personal name Hui (惠), eighth daughter
    - Married Lai Leng, Marquis Zhengqiang (來棱), and had issue (one son)
  - Princess Luyang (魯陽公主), personal name Chen (臣), ninth daughter
  - Princess Leping (樂平公主), personal name Xiaoying (小迎), tenth daughter
  - Princess Cheng'an (成安公主), personal name Xiaomin (小民), 11th daughter

== See also ==
- Family tree of the Han dynasty

Emperor Ming of Han House of Liu Born: 28 Died: 75
Regnal titles
Preceded by Emperor Guangwu of Han	Emperor of China; Eastern Han; 57–75	Succeeded by Emperor Zhang of Han
