= 210s =

Decade

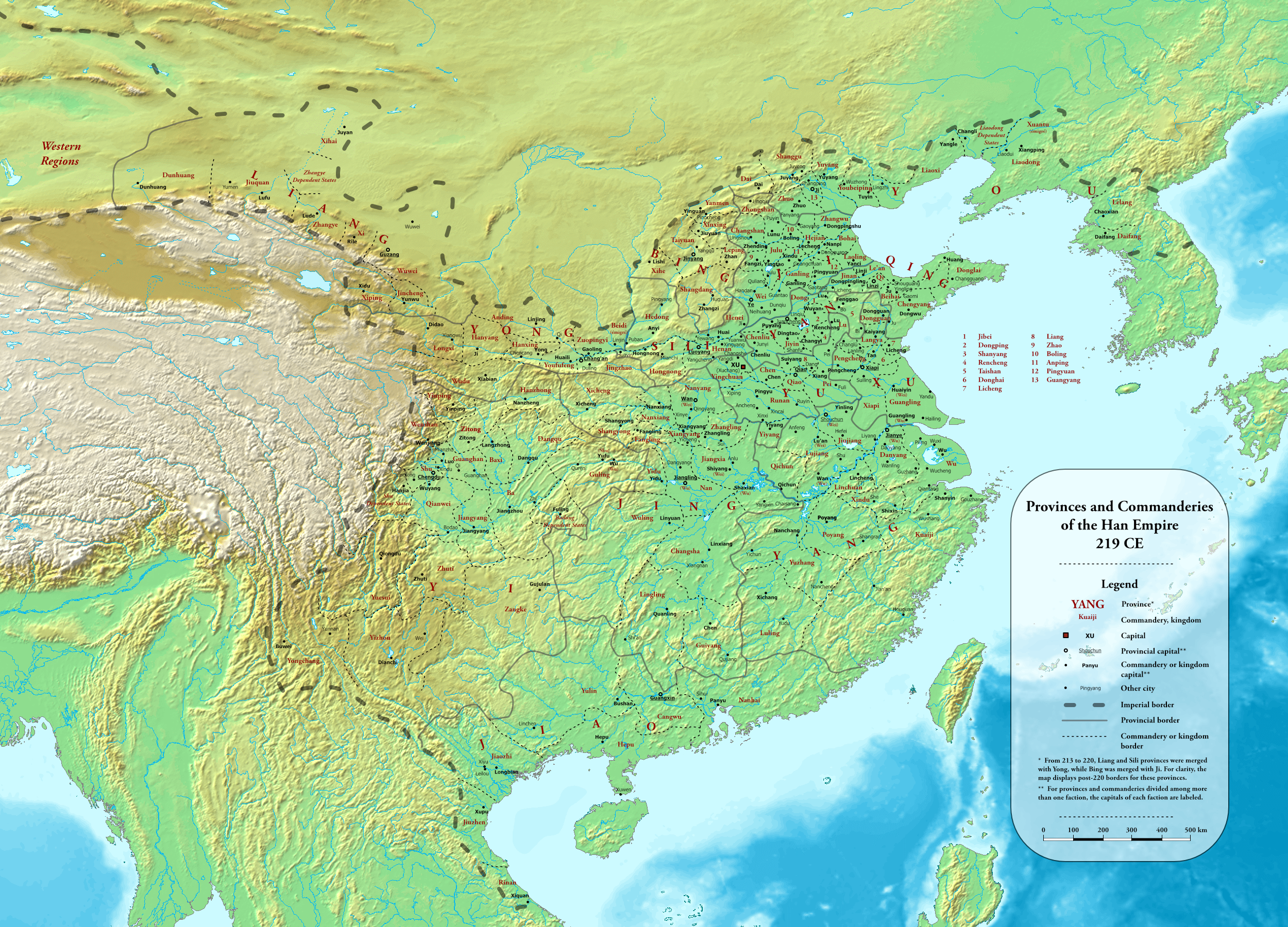
The provinces of the Han dynasty in 219, the penultimate year of the Han dynasty.

The 210s decade ran from January 1, 210, to December 31, 219.

== Events ==
=== 210 ===
==== By place ====
====== Roman Empire ======
- Having suffered heavy losses since invading Scotland in 208, Emperor Septimius Severus sends his son - Caracalla - to systematically wipe out and torture the Scots into submission.

=== 211 ===
==== By place ====
====== Roman Empire ======
- February 4 – Emperor Septimius Severus, having fallen ill, dies in Eboracum (modern-day York) while on campaign in Britain after an 18-year reign. He is later deified by the Senate. His sons Caracalla and Geta succeed him as joint Roman Emperors.
- December 19 – Geta is lured to come without his bodyguards to meet Caracalla, to discuss a possible reconciliation. When he arrives the Praetorian Guard murders him, and he dies in the arms of his mother Julia Domna.
- Eboracum becomes the capital of Britannia Inferior, a northern province of the Roman Empire.

====== China ======
- January – Warlord Cao Cao writes Ràng Xiàn Zì Míng Běn Zhì Lìng (讓縣自明本志令)
- March – September: Battle of Tong Pass: Cao Cao defeats Ma Chao.

====== Parthia ======
- Ardashir I becomes king of part of Persia.

==== By topic ====
====== Art ======
- Baths of Caracalla construction begins (approximate date).

====== Religion ======
- Marcus I is succeeded by Philadelphus, as Patriarch of Constantinople.

=== 212 ===
==== By place ====
====== Roman Empire ======
- The edict of Emperor Caracalla (Constitutio Antoniniana) extends Roman citizenship to all free inhabitants of the Roman Empire, with the exception of a limited group that may include Egyptians. The Jewish people are among those who receive citizenship. All free women in the Empire are given the same rights as Roman women.
- Roman jurist Papinian, one of the famous jurists who flourished during the reign of the late emperor Septimius Severus, refuses to write a legal defence for the murder of Caracalla's brother, Publius Septimius Geta. He is beheaded in Rome, in Caracalla's presence.
- Caracalla quiets the objections of the Roman army to Geta's murder, by huge donations.
- Construction begins on the Baths of Caracalla in Rome.
- Edessa in Mesopotamia becomes a Roman province.

=== 213 ===
==== By place ====
====== Roman Empire ======
- Emperor Caracalla leaves Rome and expels some Germanic marauders from Gaul, while his mother, Julia Domna, rules the Empire. He defends the northern Rhine frontier against the Alamanni and the Chatti. Caracalla wins over the Germanic tribes on the banks of the River Main, and gives himself the title "Germanicus". It is probably while campaigning in Germania that he takes a liking to the caracalla, a Celtic or Germanic tunic from which he acquires the name by which he is known.

====== China (Han dynasty) ======
- Cao Cao, the prime minister of the Han dynasty, is titled Wei Gong (Duke of Wei) and given a fief of ten cities under his domain. This later becomes the Kingdom of Wei.

=== 214 ===
==== By place ====
====== Roman Empire ======
- The kingdom of Osroene becomes a province of the Roman Empire.
- Caracalla's victories in Germany ensure his popularity within the Roman army.
- The defences of Rhaetia are reinforced, in the form of an uninterrupted stone wall.

====== Korea ======
- The Korean kingdom of Baekje attacks the Mohe tribes.
- Gusu becomes king of Baekje.

====== China ======
- Battle of Xiaoyao Ford: General Zhang Liao under the command of Cao Cao beats back Sun Quan at Hefei.
- Liu Bei takes Yi Province from his clansman Liu Zhang, forming the later basis for Shu Han during the Three Kingdoms period.
- Pang Tong dies in the hands of the enemy in an ambush at the Valley of the Fallen Phoenix.

=== 215 ===
==== By place ====
====== Roman Empire ======
- Caracalla's troops massacre the population of Alexandria, Egypt, beginning with the leading citizens. The emperor was angry about a satire, produced in Alexandria, mocking his claim that he killed Geta in self-defense.
- A coin, the Antoninianus, is introduced. The weight of this coin is a mere ^{1}/_{50} of a pound. Copper disappears gradually, and by the middle of the third century, with Rome's economy in crisis, the Antonianus will be the only official currency.

====== China ======
- Zhang Liao holds off Sun Quan's invasion force at the Battle of Xiaoyao Ford in Hefei, China.

====== Caucasus ======
- Vachagan I becomes king of Caucasian Albania.

=== 216 ===
==== By place ====
====== Roman Empire ======
- The Baths of Caracalla in Rome are completed with public baths (Thermae), reading rooms, auditoriums, running tracks, and public gardens that cover 20 acres.
- Emperor Caracalla tricks the Parthians by accepting a marriage proposal. He slaughters his bride and the wedding guests after the celebrations.
- Caracalla provokes a war with Artabanus V (of Parthia) to imitate his idol Alexander the Great. He crosses the Tigris, destroys towns and spoils the tombs of Arbela. The Roman army annexes Armenia.
- The basilica of Leptis Magna, ordered by Septimius Severus, is completed.

====== China ======
- Chinese warlord Cao Cao is made a vassal and ruler of Wei (Former Wei) by Emperor Xian, the last ruler of the Han Dynasty.

==== By topic ====
====== Religion ======
- Mithraism, which had begun in Persia, is on course to be adopted by many Roman soldiers serving in Asia.

=== 217 ===
==== By place ====
====== Roman Empire ======
- April 8 – Caracalla is assassinated by his soldiers near Edessa. Marcus Opellius Macrinus, head of the Praetorian Guard, declares himself Roman emperor.
- Summer – Battle of Nisibis: A Roman army, under the command of Macrinus, is defeated in a three days' battle by the Parthians at Nisibis, in the province of Mesopotamia.
- King Artabanus V signs a peace treaty with Rome after he receives 200 million sesterces, for the rebuilding of towns destroyed during the war in Parthia.
- Macrinus, of Mauritania, becomes the first equestrian Roman emperor.
- Empress Julia, wife of Septimius Severus and mother of Caracalla and Geta, commits suicide.
- The Colosseum is badly damaged by fire (lightning) which destroys the wooden upper levels of the amphitheater.

====== China ======
- Battle of Ruxu: Warlord Cao Cao once again clashes with his rival Sun Quan in Yang Province.

==== By topic ====
====== Religion ======
- December 20 – The papacy of Zephyrinus ends. Callixtus I is elected as the sixteenth pope, but is opposed by the theologian Hippolytus who accuses him of laxity and of being a Modalist, one who denies any distinction between the three persons of the Trinity.
- Hippolytus begins his "pontificate" as antipope and sets up a breakaway church for Christian followers.

====== Sports ======
- According to a tradition noted by 19th-century historian Stephen Glover, the earliest recorded game of association football (soccer) took place in Derby, England as a celebration on Shrove Tuesday, the day before commencement of the Lent season on Ash Wednesday, and 47 days before Easter Sunday

=== 218 ===
==== By place ====
====== Roman Empire ======
- May 16 – Julia Maesa, an aunt of the assassinated Emperor Caracalla, is banished to her home in Syria by the self-proclaimed emperor Macrinus, and declares her grandson Elagabalus, age 14, emperor of Rome.
- June 8 – Battle of Antioch: Elagabalus defeats, with the support of the Syrian legions, the forces of Macrinus. Macrinus flees, but is captured near Chalcedon and later executed in Cappadocia.
- Diadumenianus, son of Macrinus, escapes to the Parthian court, but is captured at Zeugma and also put to death.

====== Asia ======
- Spring – Ji Ben (or Ji Ping), Chinese court physician, plots a rebellion in the imperial capital Xu (modern-day Xuchang), but the revolt is suppressed and the conspirators are captured and executed.

==== By topic ====
====== Commerce ======
- The silver content of the Roman denarius falls to 43 percent under the reign of Elagabalus, down from 50 percent under Septimius Severus, as he empties the treasury.

=== 219 ===
==== By place ====
====== Roman Empire ======
- Imperator Marcus Aurelius Antoninus Augustus (Elagabalus) and Quintus Tineius Sacerdos become Roman Consuls.
- Julia Maesa arranges, for her grandson Elagabalus, a marriage with Julia Paula. The wedding is a lavish ceremony and Paula is given the honorific title of Augusta.
- Legions III Gallica and IV Scythica are disbanded by Elagabalus after their leaders, Verus and Gellius Maximus, rebel.
- Emperor Elagabalus, age 15, is initiated into the worship of the Phrygian gods Cybele and Attis.

====== India ======
- The reign of Pulona, Satavahana king of Andhra, begins in India.

====== China ======
- The Battle of Mount Dingjun ends with Liu Bei emerging victorious. He declares himself king of Hanzhong afterwards.
- Guan Yu floods the fortress at Fan (present-day Fancheng District, Xiangyang, Hubei) in the Battle of Fancheng, while Lü Meng captures his base in Jing Province. Guan Yu retreats to Maicheng, falls into an ambush, and gets captured by Sun Quan's forces.
- Cao Cao controls the Yellow River basin and northern China. Sun Quan rules southern China. Liu Bei controls Yi Province (covering present-day Sichuan and Chongqing).
- Tuoba Liwei becomes the first chieftain of the Tuoba clan of the Xianbei people.

== Births ==
210

- May 10 – Claudius II, Roman emperor (d. 270)
- Dexippus, Greek historian and general (d. 273)
- Egnatius Lucillianus, Roman governor (d. 244)
- Ruan Ji, Chinese musician and poet (d. 263)

211

- Sima Zhao, Chinese general and politician (d. 265)
- Xiahou Hui (or Yuanrong), Chinese noblewoman (d. 234)

213

- Gregory Thaumaturgus, Christian bishop (d. 270)
- Sun Lü, Chinese general and nobleman (d. 232)

214

- May 10 – Claudius Gothicus, Roman emperor (d. 270)
- September 9 – Aurelian, Roman emperor (d. 275)
- Cao Gan, Chinese prince and son of Cao Cao (d. 261)
- Diophantus, Greek mathematician (approximate date)
- Yang Huiyu, Chinese empress dowager (d. 278)

215

- Huangfu Mi (or Shi'an), Chinese physician and poet (d. 282)

216

- Mani, prophet and founder of Manichaeism (d. 274)

217

- Fu Xuan, Chinese historian and poet (d. 278)
- Hua He, Chinese official and historian (d. 278)
- Jia Chong, Chinese politician and general (d. 282)
- Wang Yuanji, Chinese empress dowager (d. 268)

218

- Gallienus, Roman emperor (d. 268)
- Yu Si, Chinese general and politician

219

- Hua He (or Yongxian), Chinese official and historian (d. 278)
- Sun Jun (or Ziyuan), Chinese general and regent (d. 256)

== Deaths ==
210

- Cao Chun, Chinese general and adviser (b. 170)
- Liu Hong, Chinese astronomer and politician (b. 129)
- Sextus Empiricus, Greek philosopher and writer
- Zhou Yu, Chinese general and strategist (b. 175)

211

- February 4 – Septimius Severus, Roman emperor (b. 145)
- December 26 – Publius Septimius Geta, Roman emperor (b. 189)
- Fulvia Plautilla, Roman empress and wife of Caracalla
- Serapion of Antioch, patriarch of Antioch

212

- Annia Cornificia Faustina Minor, daughter of Marcus Aurelius (b. 160)
- Gao You, Chinese scholar, historian, politician and writer (b 168).
- Ma Teng (or Shoucheng), Chinese general and warlord
- Papinian, Roman jurist and praetorian prefect (b. 142)
- Serenus Sammonicus, Roman poet and physician
- Xun Yu, Chinese politician and adviser (b. 163)
- Zhang Hong, Chinese official and politician (b. 153)

213

- Tiberius Claudius Cleobulus, Roman politician
- Wei Kang (or Yuanjiang), Chinese politician
- Zhang Ren, Chinese general under Liu Zhang
- Zhang Song, Chinese official and adviser

214

- Chogo of Baekje, Korean ruler
- Fu Shou, Chinese empress of the Han Dynasty
- Kuai Yue (or Yidu), Chinese politician and adviser
- Pang Tong, Chinese politician and adviser (b. 179)
- Peng Yang (or Yongnian), Chinese official (b. 178)
- Sun Qian, Chinese diplomat, general and politician
- Xun You, Chinese statesman and adviser (b. 157)

215

- Chen Wu, Chinese general serving under Sun Quan
- Clement of Alexandria, Greek scholar and philosopher
- Han Sui (or Wenyue), Chinese general and warlord
- Sun Yu, Chinese warlord and cousin of Sun Quan (b. 177)
- Zhang Cheng, Chinese official serving under Cao Cao

216

- Clement of Alexandria, Greek theologian (approximate date)
- Cui Yan (or Jigui), Chinese official and politician (b. 165)
- Huo Jun (or Zhongmiao), Chinese general and official
- Mao Jie (or Xiaoxian), Chinese official and politician
- Narcissus of Jerusalem, patriarch of Jerusalem
- Pantaenus, Greek theologian (approximate date)
- Zhang Lu, Chinese warlord and religious leader

217

- April 8 – Caracalla, Roman emperor (b. 188)
- December 20 – Zephyrinus, pope of Rome
- Chen Lin, Chinese official and politician
- Dong Xi (or Yuanshi), Chinese general
- Julia Domna, Roman empress (b. 160)
- Lucius Valerius Datus, Roman prefect
- Ling Tong (or Gongji), Chinese general (b. 189)
- Lu Su, Chinese general and politician (b. 172)
- Sima Lang, Chinese official and politician (b. 171)
- Wang Can, Chinese politician and poet (b. 177)
- Xu Gan, Chinese philosopher and poet (b. 171)

218

- June 8 – Macrinus, Roman emperor (b. 165)
- Diadumenian, son of Macrinus (b. 208)
- Cao Zizheng, Chinese marquis and warlord
- Gu Shao, Chinese official and politician
- Ji Ben (or Ji Ping), Chinese physician
- Theoclia, Syrian Roman noblewoman
- Yue Jin (or Wenqian), Chinese general

219

- Jiang Qin (or Gongyi), Chinese general serving under Sun Quan
- Lu Ji (or Gongji), Chinese scholar, official and politician (b. 188)
- Marcus Munatius Sulla Cerialis, Roman governor and politician
- Pang De (or Lingming), Chinese general serving under Cao Cao
- Sima Fang (or Jianong), Chinese official and politician (b. 149)
- Sun Jiao (or Shulang), Chinese general serving under Sun Quan
- Xiahou Yuan (or Miaocai), Chinese general serving under Cao Cao
- Yang Xiu (or Dezi), Chinese official, adviser and chancellor (b. 175)
- Zhang Zhongjing, Chinese physician and pharmacologist (b. 150)
