= 165 =

165 may refer to:

- 165 (number), the natural number following 164 and preceding 166
- AD 165
- 165 BC
- 165 (New Jersey bus)
- UFC 165
- ONE 165
- 165 Loreley
- 165 series

== See also ==
- Flight 165 (disambiguation)
- Class 165 (disambiguation)
- Interstate 165 (disambiguation)
