= 217 =

217 in various calendars
- Gregorian calendar: 217; CCXVII
- Ab urbe condita: 970
- Assyrian calendar: 4967
- Balinese saka calendar: 138–139
- Bengali calendar: −377 – −376
- Berber calendar: 1167
- Buddhist calendar: 761
- Burmese calendar: −421
- Byzantine calendar: 5725–5726
- Chinese calendar: 丙申年 (Fire Monkey); 2914 or 2707 — to — 丁酉年 (Fire Rooster); 2915 or 2708
- Coptic calendar: −67 – −66
- Discordian calendar: 1383
- Ethiopian calendar: 209–210
- Hebrew calendar: 3977–3978
- Hindu calendars
- Vikram Samvat: 273–274
- Shaka Samvat: 138–139
- Kali Yuga: 3317–3318
- Holocene calendar: 10217
- Iranian calendar: 405 BP – 404 BP
- Islamic calendar: 417 BH – 416 BH
- Javanese calendar: 94–95
- Julian calendar: 217; CCXVII
- Korean calendar: 2550
- Minguo calendar: 1695 before ROC 民前1695年
- Nanakshahi calendar: −1251
- Seleucid era: 528/529 AG
- Thai solar calendar: 759–760
- Tibetan calendar: མེ་ཕོ་སྤྲེ་ལོ་ (male Fire-Monkey); 343 or −38 or −810 — to — མེ་མོ་བྱ་ལོ་ (female Fire-Bird); 344 or −37 or −809

Year 217 (CCXVII) was a common year starting on Wednesday of the Julian calendar. At the time, it was known as the Year of the Consulship of Praesens and Extricatus (or, less frequently, year 970 Ab urbe condita). The denomination 217 for this year has been used since the early medieval period, when the Anno Domini calendar era became the prevalent method in Europe for naming years.

== Events ==
=== By place ===
==== Roman Empire ====
- April 8 – Caracalla is assassinated by his soldiers near Edessa. Marcus Opellius Macrinus, head of the Praetorian Guard, declares himself Roman emperor.
- Summer – Battle of Nisibis: A Roman army, under the command of Macrinus, is defeated in a three days' battle by the Parthians at Nisibis, in the province of Mesopotamia.
- King Artabanus V signs a peace treaty with Rome after he receives 200 million sesterces, for the rebuilding of towns destroyed during the war in Parthia.
- Macrinus, of Mauretania, becomes the first equestrian Roman emperor.
- Empress Julia, wife of Septimius Severus and mother of Caracalla and Geta, commits suicide.
- The Colosseum is badly damaged by fire (lightning) which destroys the wooden upper levels of the amphitheater.

==== China ====
- Battle of Ruxu: Warlord Cao Cao once again clashes with his rival Sun Quan in Yang Province.

=== By topic ===
==== Religion ====
- December 20 – The papacy of Zephyrinus ends. Callixtus I is elected as the sixteenth pope, but is opposed by the theologian Hippolytus who accuses him of laxity and of being a Modalist, one who denies any distinction between the three persons of the Trinity.
- Hippolytus begins his "pontificate" as antipope and sets up a breakaway church for Christian followers.

==== Sports ====
- According to a tradition noted by 19th-century historian Stephen Glover, the earliest recorded game of association football (soccer) took place in Derby, England as a celebration on Shrove Tuesday, the day before commencement of the Lent season on Ash Wednesday, and 47 days before Easter Sunday

== Births ==
- Fu Xuan, Chinese historian and poet (d. 278)
- Hua He, Chinese official and historian (d. 278)
- Jia Chong, Chinese politician and general (d. 282)
- Wang Yuanji, Chinese empress dowager (d. 268)

== Deaths ==
- April 8 – Caracalla, Roman emperor (b. 188)
- December 20 – Zephyrinus, pope of Rome
- Chen Lin, Chinese official and politician
- Dong Xi (or Yuanshi), Chinese general
- Julia Domna, Roman empress (b. 160)
- Lucius Valerius Datus, Roman prefect
- Ling Tong (or Gongji), Chinese general (b. 189)
- Lu Su, Chinese general and politician (b. 172)
- Sima Lang, Chinese official and politician (b. 171)
- Wang Can, Chinese politician and poet (b. 177)
- Xu Gan, Chinese philosopher and poet (b. 171)
