= C216 =

C216 may refer to:

== Vehicles ==
- Mercedes-Benz CL-Class (C216), a car
- New York City Subway car C216; a crane car, see List of New York City Subway R-type contracts
- C216, a vehicle operated by Pennsylvania mass transit provider CamTran

== Other uses ==
- Grampians Road (C216), Victoria, Australia; see List of road routes in Victoria
- Intel Panther Point (C216), an Ivy Bridge based chipset; see List of Intel Xeon chipsets

== See also ==
- 216 (disambiguation)
- C (disambiguation)
