= 168 =

168 may also refer to:

- 168 (number), the natural number following 167 and preceding 169
- AD 168
- 168 BC
- 168 (New Jersey bus)
- UFC 168
- 168 Sibylla
- Tracy 168
- Fieseler Fi 168

== See also ==
- Class 168 (disambiguation)
