= AD 101 =

101 in various calendars
- Gregorian calendar: 101; CI
- Ab urbe condita: 854
- Assyrian calendar: 4851
- Balinese saka calendar: 22–23
- Bengali calendar: −493 – −492
- Berber calendar: 1051
- Buddhist calendar: 645
- Burmese calendar: −537
- Byzantine calendar: 5609–5610
- Chinese calendar: 庚子年 (Metal Rat); 2798 or 2591 — to — 辛丑年 (Metal Ox); 2799 or 2592
- Coptic calendar: −183 – −182
- Discordian calendar: 1267
- Ethiopian calendar: 93–94
- Hebrew calendar: 3861–3862
- Hindu calendars
- Vikram Samvat: 157–158
- Shaka Samvat: 22–23
- Kali Yuga: 3201–3202
- Holocene calendar: 10101
- Iranian calendar: 521 BP – 520 BP
- Islamic calendar: 537 BH – 536 BH
- Javanese calendar: N/A
- Julian calendar: 101; CI
- Korean calendar: 2434
- Minguo calendar: 1811 before ROC 民前1811年
- Nanakshahi calendar: −1367
- Seleucid era: 412/413 AG
- Thai solar calendar: 643–644
- Tibetan calendar: ལྕགས་ཕོ་བྱི་བ་ལོ་ (male Iron-Rat); 227 or −154 or −926 — to — ལྕགས་མོ་གླང་ལོ་ (female Iron-Ox); 228 or −153 or −925

Year 101 (CI) was a common year starting on Friday of the Julian calendar. At the time, it was known as the Year of the Consulship of Traianus and Paetus (or, less frequently, year 854 Ab urbe condita). The denomination 101 for this year has been used since the early medieval period, when the Anno Domini calendar era became the prevalent method in Europe for naming years.

== Events ==
=== By place ===
==== Roman Empire ====
- Trajan begins his fourth consulship.
- Emperor Trajan starts an expedition against Dacia, exceeding the limits of the Roman Empire set by Augustus.
- Third Battle of Tapae: Roman forces, led by Trajan, defeat the Dacian king Decebalus in Transylvania.

=== By topic ===
==== Literature ====
- Epictetus writes and publishes The Discourses of Epictetus (approximate date).

== Births ==
- January 13 – Lucius Aelius Caesar, Roman politician (d. 138)
- Felicitas of Rome, Christian female martyr (d. 165)
- Herodes Atticus, Greek rhetorician (d. 177)

== Deaths ==
- Clement I, bishop of Rome (epistle to the Corinthians) (or 102 according to Roman Catholic tradition)
- Gan Ying, Chinese ambassador of the Han dynasty
- Jia Kui, Chinese scholar and philosopher (b. AD 30)
- Silius Italicus, Roman politician and author of the Punica (annals of Hannibal during the Second Punic War) (b. c. AD 28)
