= F175 =

F175 or F1-75 or similar may refer to:

- 1975 Formula One season
- 2025 Formula One World Championship, the 75th season of Formula One Grand Prix car racing
  - F1 75 Live, the launch event for the season
- Ferrari F1-75, a Formula One race car used by Scuderia Ferrari in the 2022 Grand Prix season
- Ferrari Purosangue (Type F175), a Ferrari SUV car
- Daihatsu Hi-Line model F175, a Japanese pickup truck
- KD Kelantan (F175), a Kedah-class offshore patrol vessel of the Malaysian navy
- HMS Hecla (F175), a World War II warship
- U.S. Army F175; see List of the United States Army fire control and sighting material by supply catalog designation
- f/1.75, a f-stop in photography

== See also ==
- 175 (disambiguation)
