= AD 177 =

177 in various calendars
- Gregorian calendar: 177; CLXXVII
- Ab urbe condita: 930
- Assyrian calendar: 4927
- Balinese saka calendar: 98–99
- Bengali calendar: −417 – −416
- Berber calendar: 1127
- Buddhist calendar: 721
- Burmese calendar: −461
- Byzantine calendar: 5685–5686
- Chinese calendar: 丙辰年 (Fire Dragon); 2874 or 2667 — to — 丁巳年 (Fire Snake); 2875 or 2668
- Coptic calendar: −107 – −106
- Discordian calendar: 1343
- Ethiopian calendar: 169–170
- Hebrew calendar: 3937–3938
- Hindu calendars
- Vikram Samvat: 233–234
- Shaka Samvat: 98–99
- Kali Yuga: 3277–3278
- Holocene calendar: 10177
- Iranian calendar: 445 BP – 444 BP
- Islamic calendar: 459 BH – 458 BH
- Javanese calendar: 53–54
- Julian calendar: 177; CLXXVII
- Korean calendar: 2510
- Minguo calendar: 1735 before ROC 民前1735年
- Nanakshahi calendar: −1291
- Seleucid era: 488/489 AG
- Thai solar calendar: 719–720
- Tibetan calendar: མེ་ཕོ་འབྲུག་ལོ་ (male Fire-Dragon); 303 or −78 or −850 — to — མེ་མོ་སྦྲུལ་ལོ་ (female Fire-Snake); 304 or −77 or −849

Year 177 (CLXXVII) was a common year starting on Tuesday of the Julian calendar. At the time, it was known as the Year of the Consulship of Commodus and Plautius (or, less frequently, year 930 Ab urbe condita). The denomination 177 for this year has been used since the early medieval period, when the Anno Domini calendar era became the prevalent method in Europe for naming years.

== Events ==
=== By place ===
==== Roman Empire ====
- Lucius Aurelius Commodus Caesar (age 15) and Marcus Peducaeus Plautius Quintillus become Roman Consuls.
- Commodus is given the title Augustus, and is made co-emperor, with the same status as his father, Marcus Aurelius.
- A systematic persecution of Christians begins in Rome; the followers take refuge in the catacombs.
- The churches in southern Gaul are destroyed after a crowd accuses the local Christians of practicing cannibalism.
- Forty-eight Christians are martyred in Lyon (Saint Blandina and Pothinus, bishop of Lyon, are among them).
- Second Marcomannic War: Marcus Aurelius and Commodus begin war against the Quadi and the Marcomanni.

==== Asia ====
- Chinese troops suffer a crushing defeat against a confederacy of Central Asian tribes, led by the Xianbei (see Wu Hu).

== Births ==
- Cao Ang, Chinese warlord and son of Cao Cao (d.197)
- Huo Jun, Chinese general of the Eastern Han (d. 216)
- Lucius Aurelius Commodus Pompeianus, Roman politician
- Sun Yu, Chinese warlord and cousin of Sun Quan (d. 215)
- Wang Can, Chinese politician, scholar and poet (d. 217)
- Zhu Huan, Chinese general of the Eastern Wu state (d. 238)

== Deaths ==
- Blandina, Christian martyr and saint (b. 162)
- Herodes Atticus, Greek politician (b. AD 101)
- Polycarpus, Greco-Roman bishop (b. AD 69)
- Pothinus, Roman bishop and martyr (b. AD 87)
