= AD 129 =

129 in various calendars
- Gregorian calendar: 129; CXXIX
- Ab urbe condita: 882
- Assyrian calendar: 4879
- Balinese saka calendar: 50–51
- Bengali calendar: −465 – −464
- Berber calendar: 1079
- Buddhist calendar: 673
- Burmese calendar: −509
- Byzantine calendar: 5637–5638
- Chinese calendar: 戊辰年 (Earth Dragon); 2826 or 2619 — to — 己巳年 (Earth Snake); 2827 or 2620
- Coptic calendar: −155 – −154
- Discordian calendar: 1295
- Ethiopian calendar: 121–122
- Hebrew calendar: 3889–3890
- Hindu calendars
- Vikram Samvat: 185–186
- Shaka Samvat: 50–51
- Kali Yuga: 3229–3230
- Holocene calendar: 10129
- Iranian calendar: 493 BP – 492 BP
- Islamic calendar: 508 BH – 507 BH
- Javanese calendar: 4–5
- Julian calendar: 129; CXXIX
- Korean calendar: 2462
- Minguo calendar: 1783 before ROC 民前1783年
- Nanakshahi calendar: −1339
- Seleucid era: 440/441 AG
- Thai solar calendar: 671–672
- Tibetan calendar: ས་ཕོ་འབྲུག་ལོ་ (male Earth-Dragon); 255 or −126 or −898 — to — ས་མོ་སྦྲུལ་ལོ་ (female Earth-Snake); 256 or −125 or −897

Year 129 (CXXIX) was a common year starting on Friday of the Julian calendar. At the time, it was known as the Year of the Consulship of Celsus and Marcellus (or, less frequently, year 882 Ab urbe condita). The denomination 129 for this year has been used since the early medieval period, when the Anno Domini calendar era became the prevalent method in Europe for naming years.

== Events ==
=== By place ===
==== Roman Empire ====
- A defense for Numidia is constructed at Lambaesis by Legio III Augusta.
- Emperor Hadrian continues his voyages, now inspecting Caria, Cappadocia and Syria.

=== By topic ===
==== Songs ====
- The song "Angel's Hymn" is made.

==== Religion ====
- Change of Patriarch of Constantinople, from Patriarch Diogenes to Eleutherius.

== Births ==
- Chen Ji, Chinese official, chancellor (d. 199)
- Galen, Greek physician, anatomist (d. c. 200/216)
- Liu Hong, Chinese official, astronomer (d. 210)

== Deaths ==
- June 19 – Justus of Alexandria, Egyptian patriarch
- King Osroes I of the Parthian Empire
