= I165 =

I65 or I-165 may refer to:

- Interstate 165 (disambiguation)
- Japanese submarine I-165
