= Yedian =

Yedian may refer to:

- Night Inn (夜店), 1947 Chinese film
- One Night in Supermarket (夜·店), 2009 Chinese film
- Yedian, Shandong (野店), a town in Mengyin County, Shandong, China
