= 216 (disambiguation) =

216 may refer to:

- 216 (year)
- 216 (number)
- Area code 216
- Hunter 216
- ISO 216
- UFC 216
- Tunisia's international calling code

== See also ==
- 216th (disambiguation)
