= 160 =

160 may refer to:

- 160 (number), the natural number following 159 and preceding 161
- AD 160, a year
- 160 BC, a year
- 160 (New Jersey bus), United States
- 160th (Welsh) Brigade
- UFC 160
- Tuvli 160
- Cine 160
