= 165 BC =

165 BC in various calendars
- Gregorian calendar: 165 BC; CLXV BC
- Ab urbe condita: 589
- Ancient Egypt era: XXXIII dynasty, 159
- Pharaoh: Ptolemy VI Philometor, 16
- Ancient Greek Olympiad (summer): 153rd Olympiad, year 4
- Assyrian calendar: 4586
- Balinese saka calendar: N/A
- Bengali calendar: −758 – −757
- Berber calendar: 786
- Buddhist calendar: 380
- Burmese calendar: −802
- Byzantine calendar: 5344–5345
- Chinese calendar: 乙亥年 (Wood Pig); 2533 or 2326 — to — 丙子年 (Fire Rat); 2534 or 2327
- Coptic calendar: −448 – −447
- Discordian calendar: 1002
- Ethiopian calendar: −172 – −171
- Hebrew calendar: 3596–3597
- Hindu calendars
- Vikram Samvat: −108 – −107
- Shaka Samvat: N/A
- Kali Yuga: 2936–2937
- Holocene calendar: 9836
- Iranian calendar: 786 BP – 785 BP
- Islamic calendar: 810 BH – 809 BH
- Javanese calendar: N/A
- Julian calendar: N/A
- Korean calendar: 2169
- Minguo calendar: 2076 before ROC 民前2076年
- Nanakshahi calendar: −1632
- Seleucid era: 147/148 AG
- Thai solar calendar: 378–379
- Tibetan calendar: ཤིང་མོ་ཕག་ལོ་ (female Wood-Boar) −38 or −419 or −1191 — to — མེ་ཕོ་བྱི་བ་ལོ་ (male Fire-Rat) −37 or −418 or −1190

Year 165 BC was a year of the pre-Julian Roman calendar. At the time it was known as the Year of the Consulship of Torquatus and Octavius (or, less frequently, year 589 Ab urbe condita). The denomination 165 BC for this year has been used since the early medieval period, when the Anno Domini calendar era became the prevalent method in Europe for naming years.

== Events ==
=== By place ===
==== Seleucid Empire ====
- Artaxias I, king of Armenia, is taken captive by the Seleucid king Antiochus IV Epiphanes when he attacks Armenia. Artaxias is forced to recognize Antiochus IV's suzerainty over Armenia before he is released.

==== Roman Republic ====
- The Roman playwright Terence's play Hecyra (The Mother-in-Law) is first performed.

== Births ==
- Sima Tan, Chinese astrologist and historian (approximate date)

== Deaths ==
- Mattathias, Jewish leader of the Maccabees
- Phraates I, king of Parthia (Arsacid dynasty)
