= 218 =

218 in various calendars
- Gregorian calendar: 218; CCXVIII
- Ab urbe condita: 971
- Assyrian calendar: 4968
- Balinese saka calendar: 139–140
- Bengali calendar: −376 – −375
- Berber calendar: 1168
- Buddhist calendar: 762
- Burmese calendar: −420
- Byzantine calendar: 5726–5727
- Chinese calendar: 丁酉年 (Fire Rooster); 2915 or 2708 — to — 戊戌年 (Earth Dog); 2916 or 2709
- Coptic calendar: −66 – −65
- Discordian calendar: 1384
- Ethiopian calendar: 210–211
- Hebrew calendar: 3978–3979
- Hindu calendars
- Vikram Samvat: 274–275
- Shaka Samvat: 139–140
- Kali Yuga: 3318–3319
- Holocene calendar: 10218
- Iranian calendar: 404 BP – 403 BP
- Islamic calendar: 416 BH – 415 BH
- Javanese calendar: 95–96
- Julian calendar: 218; CCXVIII
- Korean calendar: 2551
- Minguo calendar: 1694 before ROC 民前1694年
- Nanakshahi calendar: −1250
- Seleucid era: 529/530 AG
- Thai solar calendar: 760–761
- Tibetan calendar: མེ་མོ་བྱ་ལོ་ (female Fire-Bird); 344 or −37 or −809 — to — ས་ཕོ་ཁྱི་ལོ་ (male Earth-Dog); 345 or −36 or −808

Year 218 (CCXVIII) was a common year starting on Thursday of the Julian calendar. At the time, it was known as the Year of the Consulship of Severus and Adventus (or, less frequently, year 971 Ab urbe condita). The denomination 218 for this year has been used since the early medieval period, when the Anno Domini calendar era became the prevalent method in Europe for naming years.

== Events ==
=== By place ===
==== Roman Empire ====
- May 16 – Julia Maesa, an aunt of the assassinated Emperor Caracalla, is banished to her home in Syria by the self-proclaimed emperor Macrinus, and declares her grandson Elagabalus, age 14, emperor of Rome.
- June 8 – Battle of Antioch: Elagabalus defeats, with the support of the Syrian legions, the forces of Macrinus. Macrinus flees, but is captured near Chalcedon and later executed in Cappadocia.
- Diadumenianus, son of Macrinus, escapes to the Parthian court, but is captured at Zeugma and also put to death.

==== Asia ====
- Spring – Ji Ben (or Ji Ping), Chinese court physician, plots a rebellion in the imperial capital Xu (modern-day Xuchang), but the revolt is suppressed and the conspirators are captured and executed.

=== By topic ===
==== Commerce ====
- The silver content of the Roman denarius falls to 43 percent under the reign of Elagabalus, down from 50 percent under Septimius Severus, as he empties the treasury.

== Births ==
- Gallienus, Roman emperor (d. 268)
- Yu Si, Chinese general and politician

== Deaths ==
- June 8 – Macrinus, Roman emperor (b. 165)
- Diadumenian, son of Macrinus (b. 208)
- Cao Zizheng, Chinese marquis and warlord
- Gu Shao, Chinese official and politician
- Ji Ben (or Ji Ping), Chinese physician
- Yue Jin (or Wenqian), Chinese general
