= 216th =

216th may refer to:

- 216th Battalion (Bantams), CEF, a unit in the Canadian Expeditionary Force during the First World War
- 216th Infantry Division (German), raised in 1939 in Hameln Lower Saxony from primarily Landwehr in the area around Hannover
- 216th Infantry Division (Germany), created on 26 August 1939 by reorganizing several Border Defense and Army Reserve units from Lower Saxony
- 216th Motor Rifle Division, a division of the Soviet Ground Forces
- 216th Infantry Brigade, a British Army Home Service formation during the First World War
- 216th Independent Infantry Brigade (Home) a British Army Home Service formation during the Second World War
- CCXVI Field Brigade, Royal Field Artillery, a Territorial Force unit of the British Army during the First World War

== See also ==
- 216 (number)
- 216, the year 216 (CCXVI) of the Julian calendar
- 216 BC
