= 133 BC =

133 BC in various calendars
- Gregorian calendar: 133 BC; CXXXIII BC
- Ab urbe condita: 621
- Ancient Egypt era: XXXIII dynasty, 191
- Pharaoh: Ptolemy VIII Physcon, 13
- Ancient Greek Olympiad (summer): 161st Olympiad, year 4
- Assyrian calendar: 4618
- Balinese saka calendar: N/A
- Bengali calendar: −726 – −725
- Berber calendar: 818
- Buddhist calendar: 412
- Burmese calendar: −770
- Byzantine calendar: 5376–5377
- Chinese calendar: 丁未年 (Fire Goat); 2565 or 2358 — to — 戊申年 (Earth Monkey); 2566 or 2359
- Coptic calendar: −416 – −415
- Discordian calendar: 1034
- Ethiopian calendar: −140 – −139
- Hebrew calendar: 3628–3629
- Hindu calendars
- Vikram Samvat: −76 – −75
- Shaka Samvat: N/A
- Kali Yuga: 2968–2969
- Holocene calendar: 9868
- Iranian calendar: 754 BP – 753 BP
- Islamic calendar: 777 BH – 776 BH
- Javanese calendar: N/A
- Julian calendar: N/A
- Korean calendar: 2201
- Minguo calendar: 2044 before ROC 民前2044年
- Nanakshahi calendar: −1600
- Seleucid era: 179/180 AG
- Thai solar calendar: 410–411
- Tibetan calendar: མེ་མོ་ལུག་ལོ་ (female Fire-Sheep) −6 or −387 or −1159 — to — ས་ཕོ་སྤྲེ་ལོ་ (male Earth-Monkey) −5 or −386 or −1158

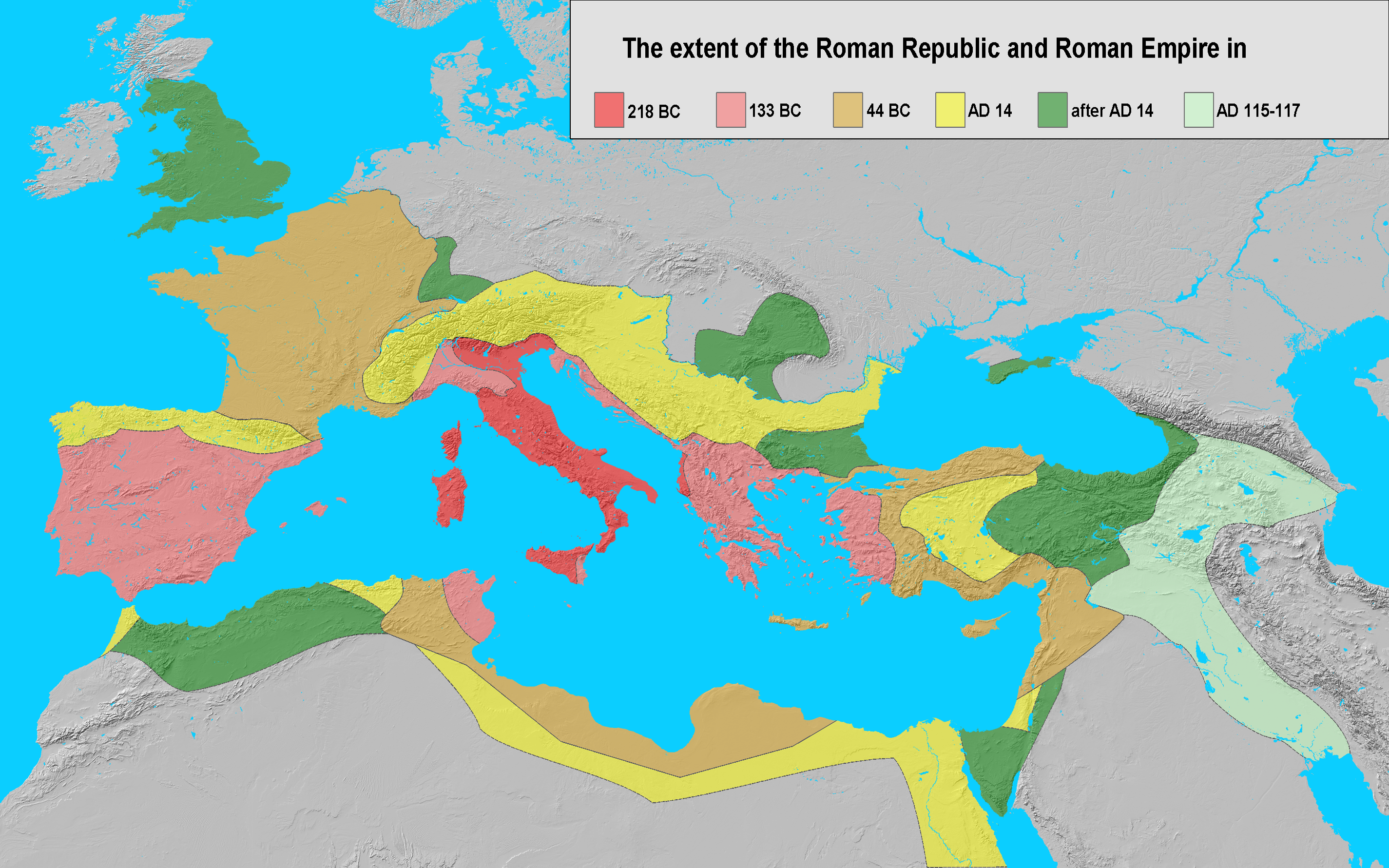
The Roman empire in 133 BC (in dark and light red)

Year 133 BC was a year of the pre-Julian Roman calendar. At the time it was known as the Year of the Consulship of Scaevola and Frugi (or, less frequently, year 621 Ab urbe condita) and the Second Year of Yuanguang. The denomination 133 BC for this year has been used since the early medieval period, when the Anno Domini calendar era became the prevalent method in Europe for naming years.

== Events ==
=== By place ===
==== Roman Republic ====
- Lucius Calpurnius Piso Frugi, as consul, is sent against the slaves in Italy. Gaius Marius serves under Publius Cornelius Scipio Aemilianus at Numantia.
- Scipio Aemilianus captures Numantia, after a siege of eight months, suffering famine and pestilence. The remnant population of 4,000 citizens, surrender and set their city on fire. Thus ends the Numantine War.
- Tiberius Sempronius Gracchus, is elected tribune of the people. He attempts to pass a law to redistribute the public land to benefit small landowners. Opposed by wealthier factions in the Roman Senate, he is killed by a group of senators and their followers that same year.
- The Kingdom of Pergamum is deeded to Rome, Aristonicus starts a rebellion against this.

==== China ====
- June – A large army of the Han dynasty, under the overall command of Han Anguo, attempts to ambush the Xiongnu leader Junchen Chanyu in the Battle of Mayi. By pretending to betray the city of Mayi, a Han official had lured Junchen onto Han soil. However, a captured Chinese officer tips off Junchen, and so he avoids the ambush. The episode abrogates the Xiongnu-Han treaty (called heqin 和親 or "harmonious kinship") and marks the beginning of Emperor Wu's Han-Xiongnu War.
- Foreign Minister Wang Hui, who, against the opposition of Han Anguo, had advocated for war, fails to attack the retreating supply column of the Xiongnu and is sentenced to death. He commits suicide.

== Deaths ==
- Attalus III, king of Pergamon. In his will, he makes the people of Rome his heirs (b. 170 BC)
- Tiberius Sempronius Gracchus the Roman tribune (assassination) (b. 168 BC)
