= AD 160 =

160 in various calendars
- Gregorian calendar: 160; CLX
- Ab urbe condita: 913
- Assyrian calendar: 4910
- Balinese saka calendar: 81–82
- Bengali calendar: −434 – −433
- Berber calendar: 1110
- Buddhist calendar: 704
- Burmese calendar: −478
- Byzantine calendar: 5668–5669
- Chinese calendar: 己亥年 (Earth Pig); 2857 or 2650 — to — 庚子年 (Metal Rat); 2858 or 2651
- Coptic calendar: −124 – −123
- Discordian calendar: 1326
- Ethiopian calendar: 152–153
- Hebrew calendar: 3920–3921
- Hindu calendars
- Vikram Samvat: 216–217
- Shaka Samvat: 81–82
- Kali Yuga: 3260–3261
- Holocene calendar: 10160
- Iranian calendar: 462 BP – 461 BP
- Islamic calendar: 476 BH – 475 BH
- Javanese calendar: 36–37
- Julian calendar: 160; CLX
- Korean calendar: 2493
- Minguo calendar: 1752 before ROC 民前1752年
- Nanakshahi calendar: −1308
- Seleucid era: 471/472 AG
- Thai solar calendar: 702–703
- Tibetan calendar: ས་མོ་ཕག་ལོ་ (female Earth-Boar); 286 or −95 or −867 — to — ལྕགས་ཕོ་བྱི་བ་ལོ་ (male Iron-Rat); 287 or −94 or −866

Year 160 (CLX) was a leap year starting on Monday of the Julian calendar. At the time, it was known in Rome as the Year of the Consulship of Atilius and Vibius (or, less frequently, year 913 Ab urbe condita). The denomination 160 for this year has been used since the early medieval period, when the Anno Domini calendar era became the prevalent method in Europe for naming years.

== Events ==
=== By place ===
- In Roman Empire, the Antonine Wall in Britain is retaken by Roman legions.
- In Jiuzhen (modern day Northern Vietnam) during the second Era of Northern Domination, a rebellion broke out but was swiftly quelled when the rebels surrendered to the newly appointed governor of Jiaozhi, who had previously governed the commandery in the 140s.

=== By topic ===
==== Art and Science ====
- In Rome, the manufacturing of soap containing grease, lime and ashes begins.
- Appian writes Ρωμαικα, known in English as the Roman History, in which he includes the history of each nation conquered up until the moment of its conquest.

==== Religion ====
- The first Buddhist monks arrive in China.

== Births ==
- Annia Cornificia Faustina Minor, daughter of Marcus Aurelius (d. 212)
- Felician of Foligno, Roman bishop and martyr (d. 250)
- Julia Domna, Roman empress consort (d. 217)
- Marius Maximus, Roman biographer (d. 230)
- Quintus Tineius Sacerdos, Roman politician
- Sextus Empiricus, Greek philosopher (d. 210)

== Deaths ==
- Marcion of Sinope, founder of Marcionism (approximate date)
- Suetonius, Roman historian and writer (approximate date)
