= 210 =

210 in various calendars
- Gregorian calendar: 210; CCX
- Ab urbe condita: 963
- Assyrian calendar: 4960
- Balinese saka calendar: 131–132
- Bengali calendar: −384 – −383
- Berber calendar: 1160
- Buddhist calendar: 754
- Burmese calendar: −428
- Byzantine calendar: 5718–5719
- Chinese calendar: 己丑年 (Earth Ox); 2907 or 2700 — to — 庚寅年 (Metal Tiger); 2908 or 2701
- Coptic calendar: −74 – −73
- Discordian calendar: 1376
- Ethiopian calendar: 202–203
- Hebrew calendar: 3970–3971
- Hindu calendars
- Vikram Samvat: 266–267
- Shaka Samvat: 131–132
- Kali Yuga: 3310–3311
- Holocene calendar: 10210
- Iranian calendar: 412 BP – 411 BP
- Islamic calendar: 425 BH – 424 BH
- Javanese calendar: 87–88
- Julian calendar: 210; CCX
- Korean calendar: 2543
- Minguo calendar: 1702 before ROC 民前1702年
- Nanakshahi calendar: −1258
- Seleucid era: 521/522 AG
- Thai solar calendar: 752–753
- Tibetan calendar: ས་མོ་གླང་ལོ་ (female Earth-Ox); 336 or −45 or −817 — to — ལྕགས་ཕོ་སྟག་ལོ་ (male Iron-Tiger); 337 or −44 or −816

Year 210 (CCX) was a common year starting on Monday of the Julian calendar. At the time, it was known as the Year of the Consulship of Faustinus and Rufinus (or, less frequently, year 963 Ab urbe condita). The denomination 210 for this year has been used since the early medieval period, when the Anno Domini calendar era became the prevalent method in Europe for naming years.

== Events ==
=== By place ===
==== Roman Empire ====
- Having suffered heavy losses since invading Scotland in 208, Emperor Septimius Severus sends his son - Caracalla - to systematically wipe out and torture the Scots into submission.

== Births ==
- May 10 – Claudius II, Roman emperor (d. 270)
- Dexippus, Greek historian and general (d. 273)
- Egnatius Lucillianus, Roman governor (d. 244)
- Ruan Ji, Chinese musician and poet (d. 263)

== Deaths ==
- Cao Chun, Chinese general and adviser (b. 170)
- Liu Hong, Chinese astronomer and politician (b. 129)
- Sextus Empiricus, Greek philosopher and writer
- Zhou Yu, Chinese general and strategist (b. 175)
