= 275 =

275 in various calendars
| Gregorian calendar | 275; CCLXXV |
| Ab urbe condita | 1028 |
| Assyrian calendar | 5025 |
| Balinese saka calendar | 196–197 |
| Bengali calendar | −319 – −318 |
| Berber calendar | 1225 |
| Buddhist calendar | 819 |
| Burmese calendar | −363 |
| Byzantine calendar | 5783–5784 |
| Chinese calendar | 甲午年 (Wood Horse); 2972 or 2765 — to — 乙未年 (Wood Goat); 2973 or 2766 |
| Coptic calendar | −9 – −8 |
| Discordian calendar | 1441 |
| Ethiopian calendar | 267–268 |
| Hebrew calendar | 4035–4036 |
- Hindu calendars
| Vikram Samvat | 331–332 |
| Shaka Samvat | 196–197 |
| Kali Yuga | 3375–3376 |
| Holocene calendar | 10275 |
| Iranian calendar | 347 BP – 346 BP |
| Islamic calendar | 358 BH – 357 BH |
| Javanese calendar | 154–155 |
| Julian calendar | 275; CCLXXV |
| Korean calendar | 2608 |
| Minguo calendar | 1637 before ROC 民前1637年 |
| Nanakshahi calendar | −1193 |
| Seleucid era | 586/587 AG |
| Thai solar calendar | 817–818 |
| Tibetan calendar | ཤིང་ཕོ་རྟ་ལོ་ (male Wood-Horse); 401 or 20 or −752 — to — ཤིང་མོ་ལུག་ལོ་ (female Wood-Sheep); 402 or 21 or −751 |

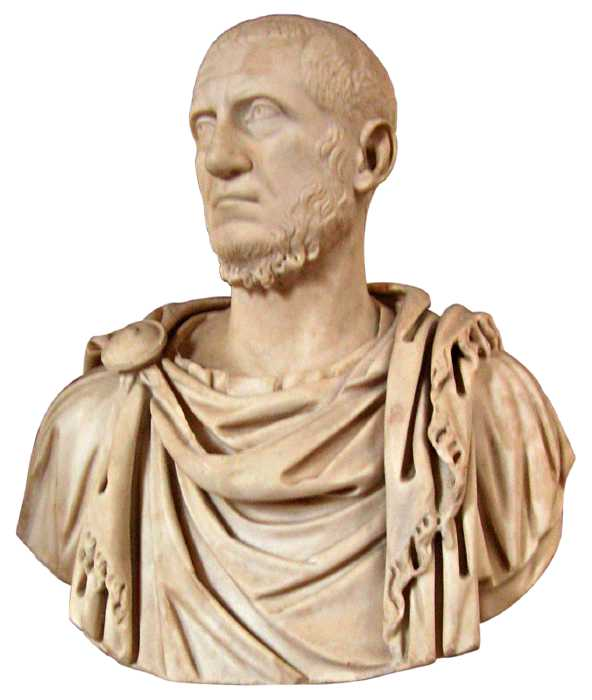
Emperor Tacitus (c. 200–276)

Year 275 (CCLXXV) was a common year starting on Friday of the Julian calendar. At the time, it was known as the Year of the Consulship of Aurelianus and Marcellinus (or, less frequently, year 1028 Ab urbe condita). The denomination 275 for this year has been used since the early medieval period, when the Anno Domini calendar era became the prevalent method in Europe for naming years.

== Events ==
=== By place ===
==== Roman Empire ====
- Emperor Aurelian puts down unrest in Gaul, and defeats Germanic incursions into Gaul and Raetia (these problems had been caused by Aurelian's defeat and overthrow of the Gallic Empire).
- The Goths begin to raid Thrace and Asia Minor. Aurelian begins a campaign against the Goths in Thrace.
- c. November – Aurelian is assassinated near Byzantium (Turkey). Aurelian had developed a reputation for punishing corruption with severity, and his secretary Eros was under suspicion. As a result, Eros, fearing for his life, forged a list of high-ranking officers marked for execution. In this way, the secretary tricked the officers into assassinating Aurelian. They then flee into Asia Minor to avoid the wrath of the soldiers.
- November/December – Marcus Claudius Tacitus is proclaimed Emperor by the imperial field army (other sources give him as proclaimed September 25 by the Senate). His half brother Marcus Annius Florianus becomes praetorian prefect.
- Tacitus marches into Asia Minor to fight the Goths and track down the faction responsible for assassinating Aurelian.

==== Asia ====
- The Pallava dynasty begins in Southern India.
- Approximate date – Himyar king Shammar Yahri'sh conquers Hadhramaut, Najran and Tihamah, unifying the territory later known as Yemen.

=== By topic ===
==== Religion ====
- January 4 – Eutychian succeeds Felix I as the 27th pope of Rome.

== Births ==
- Approximate date – Saint George of Lydda, Cappadocian Greek Roman soldier and Christian martyr (k. 303)

== Deaths ==
- c. November – Aurelian, Roman emperor (b. 214 or 215)
- Peroz I Kushanshah, ruler of the Sasanian Kingdom
- Approximate date – Septimia Zenobia, queen of the Palmyrene Empire (b. c. 240)
