= 257 =

257 in various calendars
- Gregorian calendar: 257; CCLVII
- Ab urbe condita: 1010
- Assyrian calendar: 5007
- Balinese saka calendar: 178–179
- Bengali calendar: −337 – −336
- Berber calendar: 1207
- Buddhist calendar: 801
- Burmese calendar: −381
- Byzantine calendar: 5765–5766
- Chinese calendar: 丙子年 (Fire Rat); 2954 or 2747 — to — 丁丑年 (Fire Ox); 2955 or 2748
- Coptic calendar: −27 – −26
- Discordian calendar: 1423
- Ethiopian calendar: 249–250
- Hebrew calendar: 4017–4018
- Hindu calendars
- Vikram Samvat: 313–314
- Shaka Samvat: 178–179
- Kali Yuga: 3357–3358
- Holocene calendar: 10257
- Iranian calendar: 365 BP – 364 BP
- Islamic calendar: 376 BH – 375 BH
- Javanese calendar: 136–137
- Julian calendar: 257; CCLVII
- Korean calendar: 2590
- Minguo calendar: 1655 before ROC 民前1655年
- Nanakshahi calendar: −1211
- Seleucid era: 568/569 AG
- Thai solar calendar: 799–800
- Tibetan calendar: མེ་ཕོ་བྱི་བ་ལོ་ (male Fire-Rat); 383 or 2 or −770 — to — མེ་མོ་གླང་ལོ་ (female Fire-Ox); 384 or 3 or −769

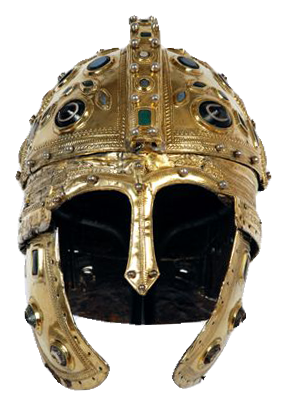
Golden Roman helmet found near Sirmium (Serbia)

Year 257 (CCLVII) was a common year starting on Thursday of the Julian calendar. At the time, it was known as the Year of the Consulship of Valerianus and Gallienus (or, less frequently, year 1010 Ab urbe condita). The denomination 257 for this year has been used since the early medieval period, when the Anno Domini calendar era became the prevalent method in Europe for naming years.

== Events ==
=== By place ===
==== Roman Empire ====
- Emperor Gallienus brings some order to the Danube area.
- Future emperor Aurelian defeats the Goths and brings many prisoners back to Rome.
- In Bavaria the Limes Germanicus (Upper Raetian Limes) along the river Iller is abandoned by the Romans.
- Valerian, under guardianship of Ingenuus, is established at Sirmium (Pannonia) to represent the Roman government in the troubled Illyrian provinces.
- Emperor Valerian recovers Antioch, Syria from King Shapur I of Persia.
- The Goths build a fleet on the Black Sea.
- The Goths separate into the Ostrogoths and the Visigoths.

=== By topic ===
==== Religion ====
- August 30 – Pope Sixtus II succeeds Pope Stephen I as the 24th pope.
- Valerian's persecution of Christians begins: his edict orders bishops and priests to sacrifice according to the pagan rituals, and prohibits Christians, under penalty of death, from meeting at the tombs of their deceased.

== Births ==
- Gregory the Illuminator, Armenian religious leader (approximate date)
- Jia Nanfeng (or Shi), Chinese empress (d. 300)

== Deaths ==
- August 2 – Stephen I, bishop of Rome
- September 26 – Zhu Yi (or Jiwen), Chinese general
- Wen Qin (or Zhongruo), Chinese general and politician
- Zhang Changpu, Chinese concubine (b. 199)
