= 267 =

267 in various calendars
- Gregorian calendar: 267; CCLXVII
- Ab urbe condita: 1020
- Assyrian calendar: 5017
- Balinese saka calendar: 188–189
- Bengali calendar: −327 – −326
- Berber calendar: 1217
- Buddhist calendar: 811
- Burmese calendar: −371
- Byzantine calendar: 5775–5776
- Chinese calendar: 丙戌年 (Fire Dog); 2964 or 2757 — to — 丁亥年 (Fire Pig); 2965 or 2758
- Coptic calendar: −17 – −16
- Discordian calendar: 1433
- Ethiopian calendar: 259–260
- Hebrew calendar: 4027–4028
- Hindu calendars
- Vikram Samvat: 323–324
- Shaka Samvat: 188–189
- Kali Yuga: 3367–3368
- Holocene calendar: 10267
- Iranian calendar: 355 BP – 354 BP
- Islamic calendar: 366 BH – 365 BH
- Javanese calendar: 146–147
- Julian calendar: 267; CCLXVII
- Korean calendar: 2600
- Minguo calendar: 1645 before ROC 民前1645年
- Nanakshahi calendar: −1201
- Seleucid era: 578/579 AG
- Thai solar calendar: 809–810
- Tibetan calendar: མེ་ཕོ་ཁྱི་ལོ་ (male Fire-Dog); 393 or 12 or −760 — to — མེ་མོ་ཕག་ལོ་ (female Fire-Boar); 394 or 13 or −759

Gothic invasions of 267-269

Year 267 (CCLXVII) was a common year starting on Tuesday of the Julian calendar. At the time, it was known in Rome as the Year of the Consulship of Paternus and Arcesilaus (or, less frequently, year 1020 Ab urbe condita). The denomination 267 for this year has been used since the early medieval period, when the Anno Domini calendar era became the prevalent method in Europe for naming years.

== Events ==
=== By place ===
==== Roman Empire ====
- First Gothic invasion: The Goths, originally from Scandinavia, with the Sarmatians (from modern Iran), invade the Balkans and Greece. They ravage Moesia and Thrace.
- The Heruli invade the Black Sea coast; they unsuccessfully attack Byzantium and Cyzicus. The Roman fleet defeats the Herulian fleet (500 ships) but allows them to escape into the Aegean Sea, where they raid the islands of Lemnos and Skyros.
- The Goths sack several cities of southern Greece including Athens, Corinth, Argos and Sparta. After the Sack of Athens, an Athenian militia force (2,000 men), under the historian Dexippus, pushes the invaders to the north where they are intercepted by the Roman army under emperor Gallienus. He wins an important victory near the Nestos River, on the boundary between Macedonia and Thrace.
- Aureolus, charged with defending Italy, defeats Victorinus (co-emperor of Gaul), is proclaimed emperor by his troops, and begins his march on Rome.

==== Near East ====
- King Septimius Odaenathus of Palmyra makes plans for a campaign in Cappadocia against the Goths. He is assassinated, along with his eldest son, most probably by his nephew due to a previous altercation between him and Odaenathus. His wife Zenobia succeeds him, and rules Vaballathus (the Palmyrene Empire) with her young son.

== Births ==
- Pei Wei (or Yimin), Chinese philosopher and politician (d. 300)

== Deaths ==
- Septimius Herodianus, co-king of Palmyra (assassinated)
- Septimius Odaenathus, king of Palmyra (assassinated)
