= 178 =

178 may refer to:

- 178 (number)
- 178 BC
- AD 178
- 178 (New Jersey bus)
- UFC 178
- Heinkel He 178
- Panhard 178
- 178 Belisana
- List of highways numbered 178
- Radical 178

== See also ==
- Flight 178
