= 300 =

300 in various calendars
- Gregorian calendar: 300; CCC
- Ab urbe condita: 1053
- Assyrian calendar: 5050
- Balinese saka calendar: 221–222
- Bengali calendar: −294 – −293
- Berber calendar: 1250
- Buddhist calendar: 844
- Burmese calendar: −338
- Byzantine calendar: 5808–5809
- Chinese calendar: 己未年 (Earth Goat); 2997 or 2790 — to — 庚申年 (Metal Monkey); 2998 or 2791
- Coptic calendar: 16–17
- Discordian calendar: 1466
- Ethiopian calendar: 292–293
- Hebrew calendar: 4060–4061
- Hindu calendars
- Vikram Samvat: 356–357
- Shaka Samvat: 221–222
- Kali Yuga: 3400–3401
- Holocene calendar: 10300
- Iranian calendar: 322 BP – 321 BP
- Islamic calendar: 332 BH – 331 BH
- Javanese calendar: 180–181
- Julian calendar: 300; CCC
- Korean calendar: 2633
- Minguo calendar: 1612 before ROC 民前1612年
- Nanakshahi calendar: −1168
- Seleucid era: 611/612 AG
- Thai solar calendar: 842–843
- Tibetan calendar: ས་མོ་ལུག་ལོ་ (female Earth-Sheep); 426 or 45 or −727 — to — ལྕགས་ཕོ་སྤྲེ་ལོ་ (male Iron-Monkey); 427 or 46 or −726

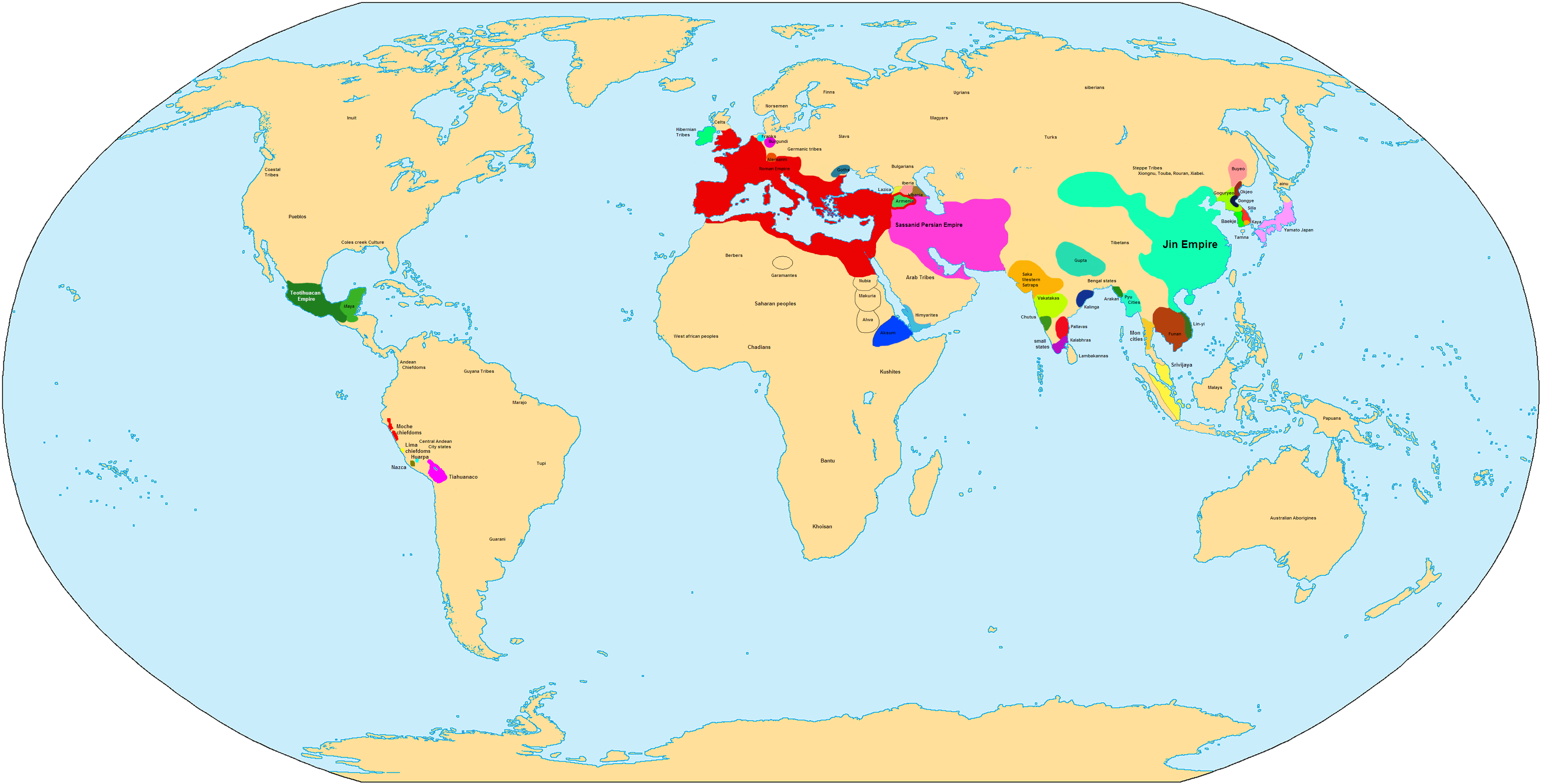
The world in 300

The year 300 (CCC) was a leap year starting on Monday of the Julian calendar. At the time, it was known as the Year of the Consulship of Constantius and Valerius (or, less frequently, year 1053 Ab urbe condita). The denomination 300 for this year has been used since the early Middle Ages / Medieval period, when the Latin language term / abbreviation "Anno Domini" ("In the year of Our Lord") for the calendar era became the prevalent universal / worldwide method for naming and numbering years.

== Events ==
=== By place ===
==== Roman Empire ====
- Emperor Diocletian begins construction of a palace that will become the city of Split (approximate date). Diocletian, who plans on abdicating, intends to use this palace as his place of retirement.
- Caesar Constantius I wins a victory over the Franks (approximate date).

==== Asia ====
- The lion becomes extinct from Armenia (approximate date).
- The Yayoi period ends in Ancient Japan (approximate date).
- Wootz steel is developed in India (approximate date).
- The Kama Sutra, an Indian handbook on the art of sexual love, is probably produced around this time by the sage Vatsyayana.
- Micheon becomes ruler of the Korean kingdom of Goguryeo.

==== Africa ====
- The elephant becomes extinct in North Africa (approximate date).
- The Atlas wild ass becomes extinct (approximate date).

==== Mesoamerica ====
- The Formative/Preclassic period in Mesoamerica comes to an end approximately around this year.
- The Mayan civilization reaches its most prolific period, the classic period, in what is now Guatemala, Belize and parts of southern Mexico adjacent to the former two. During most of this period, Tikal dominates the Mayan world.

=== By topic ===
==== Art and Science ====
- The magnetic compass for navigation is invented in China (approximate date).
- The Panchatantra, a Sanskrit collection of fables and fairy tales, is written in India.
- The Tetrarchs are probably made in Egypt. After 330 they are moved to Constantinople and in 1204 they are installed at the corner of the facade of the St Mark's Basilica, Venice (approximate date).
- Diocletian's Palace, Split, Croatia, is built. Its model is nowadays kept at the Museo della Civilta Romana, Rome.

==== Religion ====
- Peter of Alexandria becomes Patriarch of Alexandria.
- Possible date of the Codex Vaticanus Graecus 1209 and Codex Sinaiticus, manuscripts of the Bible written in Greek.
- Approximate date of the Synod of Elvira in Elvira, Spain, which prohibits interaction with Jews, pagans, and heretics.

== Births ==
- Aemilia Hilaria, Gallo-Roman physician (approximate date)
- Flavius Hermogenes, Roman prefect and politician (d. 361)
- Frumentius, Syrian missionary and bishop (approximate date)
- Hilary of Poitiers, Gallo-Roman bishop (approximate date)
- Li Shou, Chinese emperor of the Cheng Han Dynasty (d. 343)
- Macarius of Egypt, Coptic Christian monk and hermit (d. 391)
- Min of Jin, Chinese emperor of the Jin Dynasty (d. 318)
- Zeno of Verona, Christian bishop and martyr (approximate date)

== Deaths ==
- Jia Mi, Chinese general, official and politician
- Jia Nanfeng, Chinese empress of the Jin Dynasty (b. 257)
- Liu Ling, Chinese scholar and poet (b. 221)
- Lüzhu, Chinese dancer, singer and music teacher
- Pan Yue, Chinese poet and writer (b. 247)
- Pei Wei, Chinese philosopher and politician (b. 267)
- Shi Chong, Chinese politician and statesman (b. 249)
- Sima Yu, Chinese prince of the Jin Dynasty (b. 278)
- Sporus of Nicaea, Greek mathematician (approximate date)
- Zhang Hua, Chinese official, scholar and poet (b. 232)
