= AD 95 =

AD 95 in various calendars
- Gregorian calendar: AD 95; XCV
- Ab urbe condita: 848
- Assyrian calendar: 4845
- Balinese saka calendar: 16–17
- Bengali calendar: −499 – −498
- Berber calendar: 1045
- Buddhist calendar: 639
- Burmese calendar: −543
- Byzantine calendar: 5603–5604
- Chinese calendar: 甲午年 (Wood Horse); 2792 or 2585 — to — 乙未年 (Wood Goat); 2793 or 2586
- Coptic calendar: −189 – −188
- Discordian calendar: 1261
- Ethiopian calendar: 87–88
- Hebrew calendar: 3855–3856
- Hindu calendars
- Vikram Samvat: 151–152
- Shaka Samvat: 16–17
- Kali Yuga: 3195–3196
- Holocene calendar: 10095
- Iranian calendar: 527 BP – 526 BP
- Islamic calendar: 543 BH – 542 BH
- Javanese calendar: N/A
- Julian calendar: AD 95; XCV
- Korean calendar: 2428
- Minguo calendar: 1817 before ROC 民前1817年
- Nanakshahi calendar: −1373
- Seleucid era: 406/407 AG
- Thai solar calendar: 637–638
- Tibetan calendar: ཤིང་ཕོ་རྟ་ལོ་ (male Wood-Horse); 221 or −160 or −932 — to — ཤིང་མོ་ལུག་ལོ་ (female Wood-Sheep); 222 or −159 or −931

AD 95 (XCV) was a common year starting on Thursday of the Julian calendar, the 95th Year of the Anno Domini (AD) designation, the 95th year of the 1st millennium, the 95th year of the end of the 1st century, and the 5th year of the 10th decade. In the Roman Empire, it was known as the Year of the Consulship of Augustus and Clemens (or, less frequently, year 848 Ab urbe condita). The denomination AD 95 for this year has been used since the early medieval period, when the Anno Domini calendar era became the prevalent method in Europe for naming years.

== Events ==
=== By place ===
==== Roman Empire ====
- Emperor Domitian and Titus Flavius Clemens become Roman Consuls.
- Domitian executes senators out of paranoiac fears that they are plotting to kill him.
- The Roman consul Manius Acilius Glabrio is ordered by Domitian to descend into the arena of the Colosseum to fight a lion. After he kills the animal, Domitian banishes and puts him to death.

=== By topic ===
==== Epidemic ====
- In Rome a severe form of malaria appears in the farm districts and will continue for the next 500 years, taking out of cultivation the fertile land of the Campagna, whose market gardens supply the city with fresh products. The fever drives small groups of farmers into the crowded city, bringing the malaria with them, and lowers Rome's live-birth rate while rates elsewhere in the empire are rising.

==== Religion ====
- The Book of Revelation is written (approximate date).
- Possible date for the writing of the First Epistle of Peter.

== Births ==
- Appian of Alexandria, Greek historian and writer (d. 165)

== Deaths ==
- Avilius of Alexandria, patriarch of Alexandria
- Epaphroditus, Roman freedman of Nero (executed)
- Flavius Scorpus, Roman charioteer (b. c. AD 68)
- Manius Acilius Glabrio, Roman politician (executed)
