= Flight 165 =

Flight 165 may refer to:

Listed chronologically

- LOT Polish Airlines Flight 165 (1969), crashed on 2 April 1969
- Helikopter Service Flight 165, crashed on 26 June 1978
- LOT Polish Airlines Flight 165 (1978), hijacked on 30 August 1978
