= 232 =

232 in various calendars
- Gregorian calendar: 232; CCXXXII
- Ab urbe condita: 985
- Assyrian calendar: 4982
- Balinese saka calendar: 153–154
- Bengali calendar: −362 – −361
- Berber calendar: 1182
- Buddhist calendar: 776
- Burmese calendar: −406
- Byzantine calendar: 5740–5741
- Chinese calendar: 辛亥年 (Metal Pig); 2929 or 2722 — to — 壬子年 (Water Rat); 2930 or 2723
- Coptic calendar: −52 – −51
- Discordian calendar: 1398
- Ethiopian calendar: 224–225
- Hebrew calendar: 3992–3993
- Hindu calendars
- Vikram Samvat: 288–289
- Shaka Samvat: 153–154
- Kali Yuga: 3332–3333
- Holocene calendar: 10232
- Iranian calendar: 390 BP – 389 BP
- Islamic calendar: 402 BH – 401 BH
- Javanese calendar: 110–111
- Julian calendar: 232; CCXXXII
- Korean calendar: 2565
- Minguo calendar: 1680 before ROC 民前1680年
- Nanakshahi calendar: −1236
- Seleucid era: 543/544 AG
- Thai solar calendar: 774–775
- Tibetan calendar: ལྕགས་མོ་ཕག་ལོ་ (female Iron-Boar); 358 or −23 or −795 — to — ཆུ་ཕོ་བྱི་བ་ལོ་ (male Water-Rat); 359 or −22 or −794

Year 232 (CCXXXII) was a leap year starting on Sunday of the Julian calendar. At the time, it was known as the Year of the Consulship of Lupus and Maximus (or, less frequently, year 985 Ab urbe condita). The denomination 232 for this year has been used since the early medieval period, when the Anno Domini calendar era became the prevalent method in Europe for naming years.

== Events ==
=== By place ===
==== Roman Empire ====
- Roman–Persian Wars: Emperor Alexander Severus launches a three-pronged counterattack against the Persian forces of King Ardashir I, who have invaded Mesopotamia. However, the Roman army advancing through Armenia is halted. Alexander gives the order to march to the capital at Ctesiphon, but the Romans are defeated, and withdraw to Syria. The result is an acceptance of the status quo, and after heavy losses on both sides, a truce is signed.

=== By topic ===
==== Religion ====
- Relics of St. Thomas are brought to Edessa from India.
- Origen founds a school of Christian theology in Palestine.
- Pope Heraclas of Alexandria is the first Bishop of Alexandria to use the appellation of "Pope".

== Births ==
- August 19 – Marcus Aurelius Probus, Roman emperor (d. 282)
- Cao Fang, Chinese emperor of the Cao Wei state (d. 274)
- Sun Chen (or Zitong), Chinese general and regent (d. 259)
- Zhang Hua, Chinese official, scholar and poet (d. 300)

== Deaths ==
- January 30 – Hua Xin, Chinese official and politician (b. 157)
- October 22 – Demetrius I, patriarch of Alexandria (b. 127)
- December 27 – Cao Zhi, Chinese prince and poet (b. 192)
- Cao Hong, Chinese general of the Cao Wei state
- Sun Lü, Chinese general of the Cao Wei state
- Tiberius Julius Sauromates III, Roman client king
