= Class 165 =

Class 165 may refer to:

- British Rail Class 165
- Kaidai-type submarine, also known as I-165 class
