= Yedian, Shandong =

Yedian 野店镇
- Town
- Location in Shandong
- Coordinates: 35°52′50″N 118°5′24″E
- Country: People's Republic of China
- Province: Shandong
- Prefecture-level city: Linyi
- County: Mengyin County
- Time zone: UTC+8 (China Standard)

Yedian (Chinese: 野店; pinyin: Yědiàn) is a town in Mengyin County, Shandong province, China. As of 2020, it has 25 villages under its administration:

- Yedian Village
- Jiaopo Village (焦坡村)
- Yanzhuang Village (烟庄村)
- Maoping Village (毛坪村)
- Shiquan Village (石泉村)
- Nanyu Village (南峪村)
- Nanyanzi Village (南晏子村)
- Beiping Village (北坪村)
- Qipanshi Village (棋盘石村)
- Shangdongmen Village (上东门村)
- Banguya Village (板崮崖村)
- Sangziyu Village (桑子峪村)
- Dashan Village (大山村)
- Dashitou Village (大石头村)
- Huangtuliang Village (黄土良村)
- Yanmazhuang Village (演马庄村)
- Beiyanzi Village (北晏子村)
- Yingtaoyu Village (樱桃峪村)
- Sanhe Village (三合村)
- Yushi Village (峪石村)
- Zhujiapo Village (朱家坡村)
- Xinsheng Village (新盛村)
- Ping'an Village (坪安村)
- Suozhuang Village (梭庄村)
- Jinquanyu Village (金泉峪村)

== See also ==
- List of township-level divisions of Shandong
