= Class 168 =

Class 168 may refer to:

- British Rail Class 168
- Kaidai-type submarine, also known as I-168 class
