= 188 =

188 may refer to:

- 188 (number)
- AD 188
- 188 BC
- 188 (New Jersey bus)
- Bristol 188
- NGC 188
- UFC 188
- Cessna 188
- 188 Menippe
- Junkers Ju 188
- Kosmos 188
- IAPX 188
- Bundesstraße 188
- Obiekt 188
