= 282 =

282 in various calendars
- Gregorian calendar: 282; CCLXXXII
- Ab urbe condita: 1035
- Assyrian calendar: 5032
- Balinese saka calendar: 203–204
- Bengali calendar: −312 – −311
- Berber calendar: 1232
- Buddhist calendar: 826
- Burmese calendar: −356
- Byzantine calendar: 5790–5791
- Chinese calendar: 辛丑年 (Metal Ox); 2979 or 2772 — to — 壬寅年 (Water Tiger); 2980 or 2773
- Coptic calendar: −2 – −1
- Discordian calendar: 1448
- Ethiopian calendar: 274–275
- Hebrew calendar: 4042–4043
- Hindu calendars
- Vikram Samvat: 338–339
- Shaka Samvat: 203–204
- Kali Yuga: 3382–3383
- Holocene calendar: 10282
- Iranian calendar: 340 BP – 339 BP
- Islamic calendar: 350 BH – 349 BH
- Javanese calendar: 161–162
- Julian calendar: 282; CCLXXXII
- Korean calendar: 2615
- Minguo calendar: 1630 before ROC 民前1630年
- Nanakshahi calendar: −1186
- Seleucid era: 593/594 AG
- Thai solar calendar: 824–825
- Tibetan calendar: ལྕགས་མོ་གླང་ལོ་ (female Iron-Ox); 408 or 27 or −745 — to — ཆུ་ཕོ་སྟག་ལོ་ (male Water-Tiger); 409 or 28 or −744

Year 282 (CCLXXXII) was a common year starting on Sunday of the Julian calendar. At the time, it was known as the Year of the Consulship of Probus and Victorinus (or, less frequently, year 1035 Ab urbe condita). The denomination 282 for this year has been used since the early medieval period, when the Anno Domini calendar era became the prevalent method in Europe for naming years.

== Events ==
=== By place ===
==== Roman Empire ====
- Emperor Probus travels towards Sirmium (Serbia). He tries to employ his troops in peaceful projects, such as draining the swamps in Pannonia.
- The praetorian prefect Marcus Aurelius Carus usurps power in Raetia. Probus attempts to organise a campaign against Carus but is murdered by his discontented troops in Sirmium.
- Carus defeats the Quadi and Sarmatians on the Danube; for his victories he is given the title Germanicus Maximus.
- Carus appoints his sons Carinus and Numerian as Caesar.

==== China ====
- A new city is constructed in Fuzhou, slightly south of the original city Ye (the main street of the city has remained unchanged since that time).

=== By topic ===
==== Religion ====
- The Patriarch Theonas of Alexandria becomes one of the first bishops to use the title Pope.

== Deaths ==
- Huangfu Mi (or Shi'an), Chinese historian (b. 215)
- Jia Chong, Chinese politician and statesman (b. 217)
- Marcus Aurelius Probus, Roman emperor (b. 232)
- Xue Ying (or Daoyan), Chinese politician and poet
