= 179 =

179 may also refer to:

- 179 BC
- AD 179
- 179 (number)
- UFC 179, a mixed martial arts event held by the Ultimate Fighting Championship
- 179 Klytaemnestra, a stony Telramund asteroid from the outer regions of the asteroid belt
- Gliese 179, a small red dwarf star with an exoplanetary companion in the equatorial constellation of Orion
- Alfa Romeo 179, a Formula One racing car
- Radical 179, one of the 11 Kangxi radicals composed of 9 strokes meaning "leek"
