= 215 =

215 in various calendars
- Gregorian calendar: 215; CCXV
- Ab urbe condita: 968
- Assyrian calendar: 4965
- Balinese saka calendar: 136–137
- Bengali calendar: −379 – −378
- Berber calendar: 1165
- Buddhist calendar: 759
- Burmese calendar: −423
- Byzantine calendar: 5723–5724
- Chinese calendar: 甲午年 (Wood Horse); 2912 or 2705 — to — 乙未年 (Wood Goat); 2913 or 2706
- Coptic calendar: −69 – −68
- Discordian calendar: 1381
- Ethiopian calendar: 207–208
- Hebrew calendar: 3975–3976
- Hindu calendars
- Vikram Samvat: 271–272
- Shaka Samvat: 136–137
- Kali Yuga: 3315–3316
- Holocene calendar: 10215
- Iranian calendar: 407 BP – 406 BP
- Islamic calendar: 420 BH – 419 BH
- Javanese calendar: 92–93
- Julian calendar: 215; CCXV
- Korean calendar: 2548
- Minguo calendar: 1697 before ROC 民前1697年
- Nanakshahi calendar: −1253
- Seleucid era: 526/527 AG
- Thai solar calendar: 757–758
- Tibetan calendar: ཤིང་ཕོ་རྟ་ལོ་ (male Wood-Horse); 341 or −40 or −812 — to — ཤིང་མོ་ལུག་ལོ་ (female Wood-Sheep); 342 or −39 or −811

Year 215 (CCXV) was a common year starting on Sunday of the Julian calendar. At the time, it was known as the Year of the Consulship of Laetus and Sulla (or, less frequently, year 968 Ab urbe condita). The denomination 215 for this year has been used since the early medieval period, when the Anno Domini calendar era became the prevalent method in Europe for naming years.

== Events ==
=== By place ===
==== Roman Empire ====
- A coin, the Antoninianus, is introduced. The weight of this coin is a mere ^{1}/_{50} of a pound. Copper disappears gradually, and by the middle of the third century, with Rome's economy in crisis, the Antonianus will be the only official currency.

==== Egypt ====
- Caracalla's troops massacre the population of Alexandria, Egypt, beginning with the leading citizens after the Alexandrian Revolts. The emperor was angry about a satire, produced in Alexandria, mocking his claim that he killed Geta in self-defense.

==== China ====
- Zhang Liao holds off Sun Quan's invasion force at the Battle of Xiaoyao Ford in Hefei, China.

==== Caucasus ====
- Vachagan I becomes king of Caucasian Albania.

== Births ==
- Huangfu Mi (or Shi'an), Chinese physician and poet (d. 282)

== Deaths ==
- Chen Wu, Chinese general serving under Sun Quan
- Clement of Alexandria, Greek scholar and philosopher
- Fu Shou, Chinese empress of the Han Dynasty
- Han Sui (or Wenyue), Chinese general and warlord
- Sun Yu, Chinese warlord and cousin of Sun Quan (b. 177)
- Zhang Cheng, Chinese official serving under Cao Cao
