= 278 =

278 in various calendars
Gregorian calendar	278; CCLXXVIII
Ab urbe condita	1031
Assyrian calendar	5028
Balinese saka calendar	199–200
Bengali calendar	−316 – −315
Berber calendar	1228
Buddhist calendar	822
Burmese calendar	−360
Byzantine calendar	5786–5787
Chinese calendar	丁酉年 (Fire Rooster); 2975 or 2768 — to — 戊戌年 (Earth Dog); 2976 or 2769
Coptic calendar	−6 – −5
Discordian calendar	1444
Ethiopian calendar	270–271
Hebrew calendar	4038–4039
- Hindu calendars
Vikram Samvat	334–335
Shaka Samvat	199–200
Kali Yuga	3378–3379
Holocene calendar	10278
Iranian calendar	344 BP – 343 BP
Islamic calendar	355 BH – 354 BH
Javanese calendar	157–158
Julian calendar	278; CCLXXVIII
Korean calendar	2611
Minguo calendar	1634 before ROC 民前1634年
Nanakshahi calendar	−1190
Seleucid era	589/590 AG
Thai solar calendar	820–821
Tibetan calendar	阴火鸡年 (female Fire-Rooster); 404 or 23 or −749 — to — 阳土狗年 (male Earth-Dog); 405 or 24 or −748

Pisidia (Turkey)

Year 278 (CCLXXVIII) was a common year starting on Tuesday of the Julian calendar. At the time, it was known as the Year of the Consulship of Probus and Lupus (or, less frequently, year 1031 Ab urbe condita). The denomination 278 for this year has been used since the early medieval period, when the Anno Domini calendar era became the prevalent method in Europe for naming years.

== Events ==
=== By place ===
==== Roman Empire ====
- Emperor Probus defeats the Alamanni, advancing through the Neckar Valley. He expels the Franks from Gaul, and reorganizes the Roman defenses on the Rhine.
- Probus resettles the Germanic tribes in the devastated provinces of the Roman Empire. He adopts the titles of Gothicus Maximus and Germanicus Maximus.
- Piracy along the coast of Lycia et Pamphylia: The Romans besiege the city of Cremna (Pisidia) and kill the Isaurian robber Lydius.

== Births ==
- Sima Yu, Chinese crown prince of the Jin Dynasty (d. 300)

== Deaths ==
- December 27 – Yang Hu (or Shuzi), Chinese general and politician (b. 221)
- Cao Yu (or Pengzu), Chinese prince of the Cao Wei state (b. 211)
- Fu Xuan (or Xiuyi), Chinese historian, poet and politician (b. 217)
- Xi Zheng (or Lingxian), Chinese essayist, poet and politician
- Yang Huiyu, Chinese empress of the Jin Dynasty (b. 214)
