= Mengyin County =

Mengyin County 蒙阴县
- County
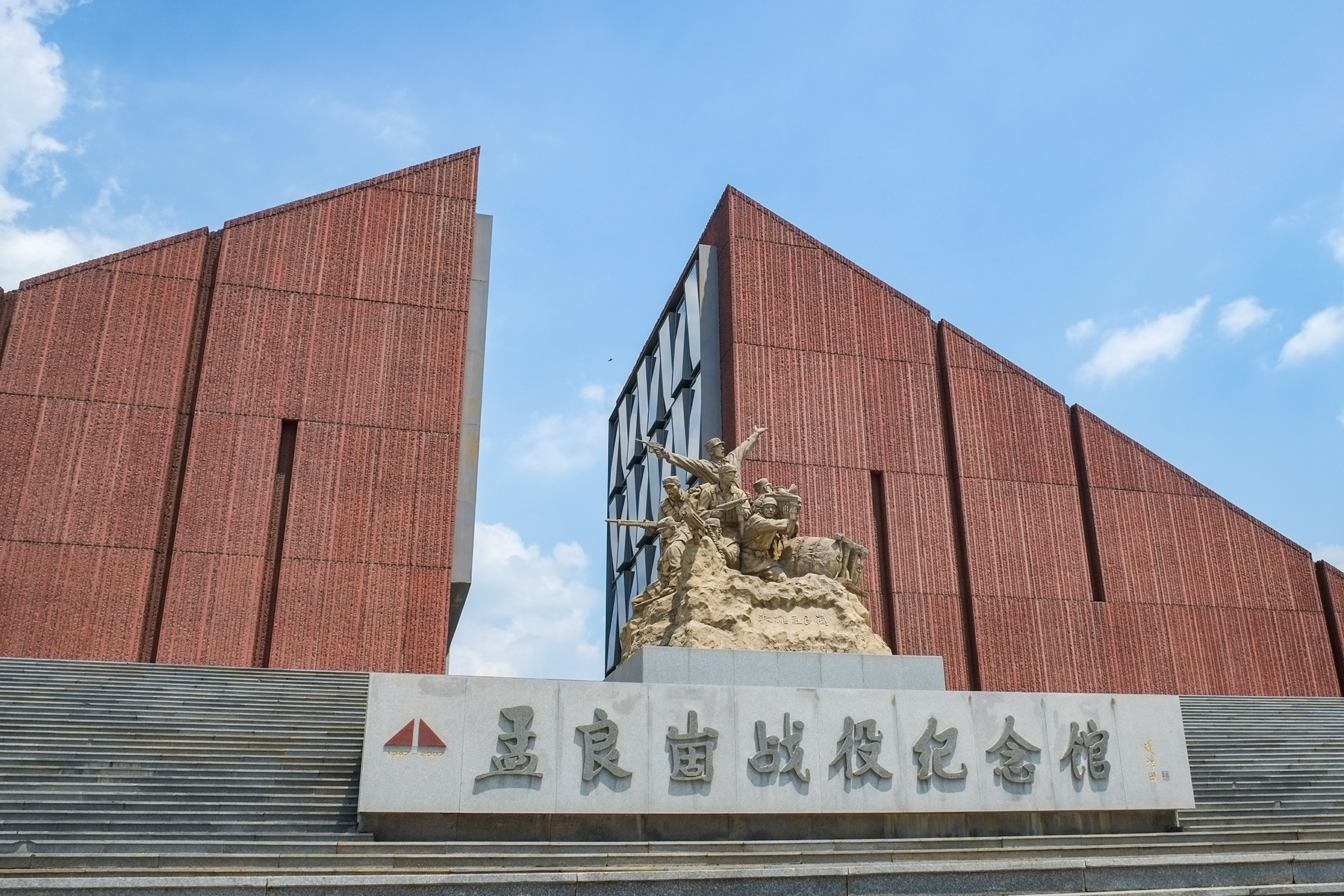
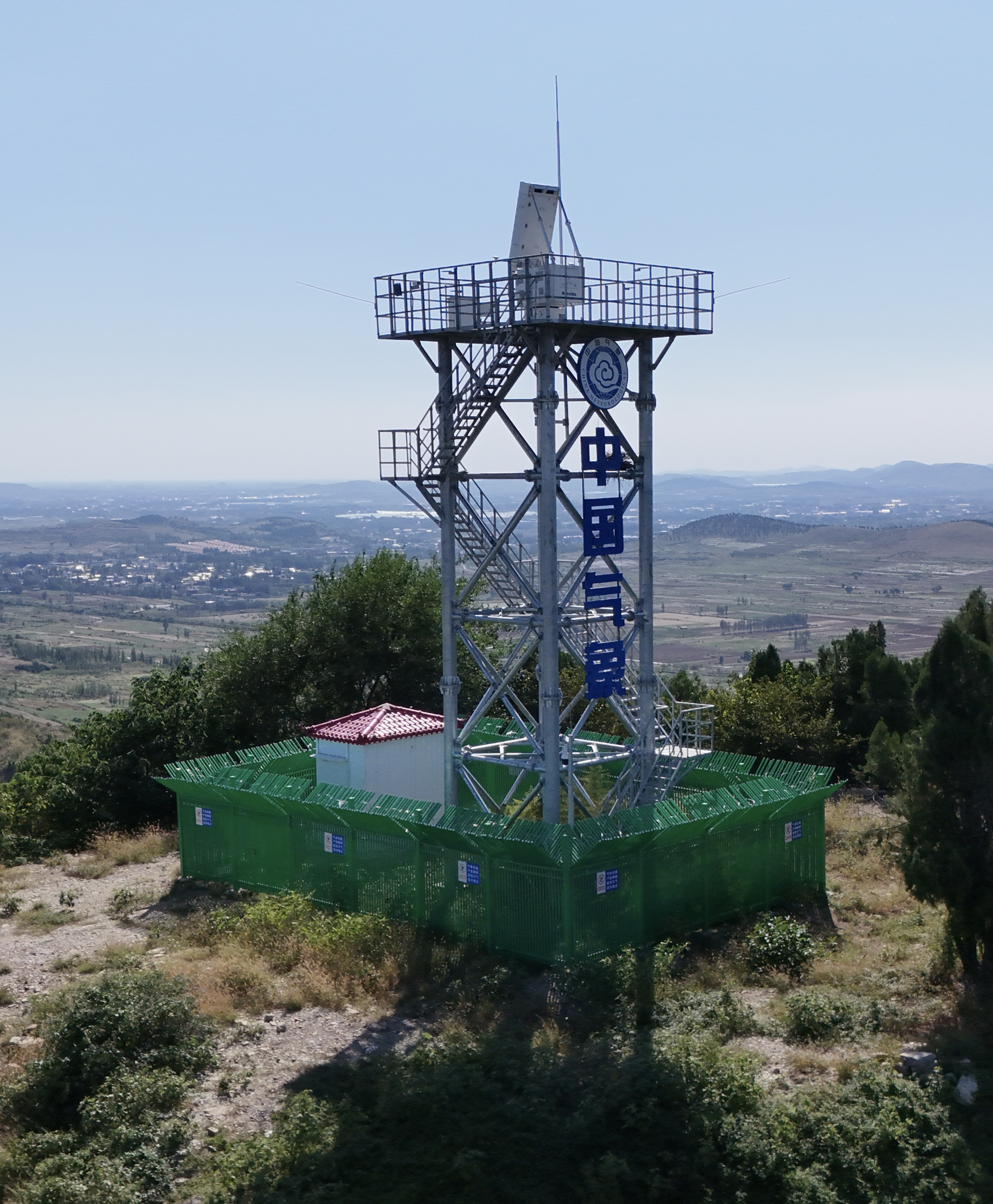
- Museum of Menglianggu campaign

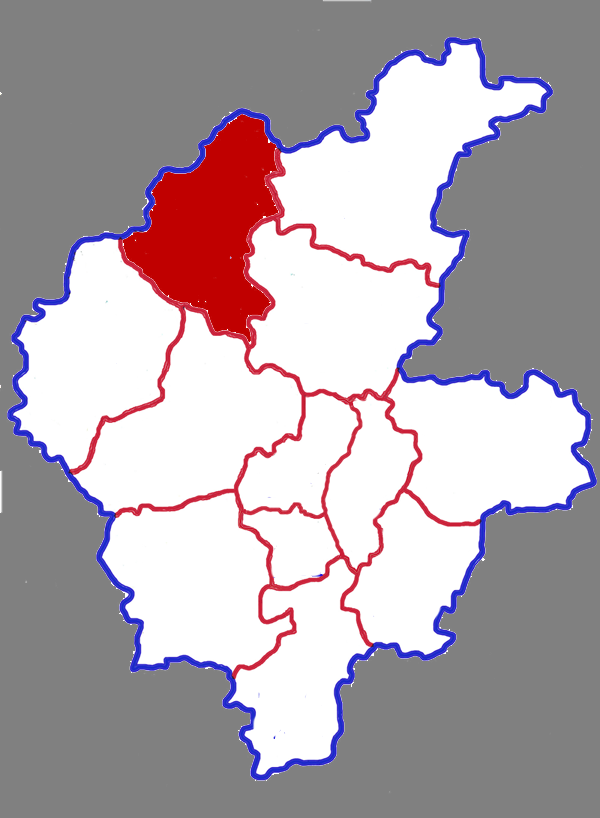
- Mengyin in Linyi

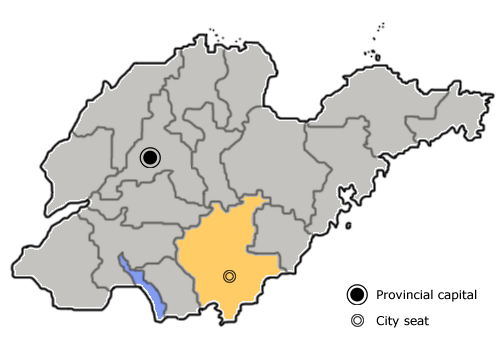
- Linyi in Shandong
- Coordinates: 35°42′36″N 117°56′42″E
- Country: People's Republic of China
- Province: Shandong
- Prefecture-level city: Linyi

Area
  - Total: 1,602 km^{2} (619 sq mi)
- Elevation: 211 m (692 ft)

Population (2019)
  - Total: 528,000
  - Density: 330/km^{2} (854/sq mi)
- Time zone: UTC+8 (China Standard)
- Postal code: 276200

Mengyin County (simplified Chinese: 蒙阴县; traditional Chinese: 蒙陰縣; pinyin: Méngyīn Xiàn) is a county in the southwest-central part of Shandong province, People's Republic of China. It is under the administration of Linyi City.

The population was 524,565 in 1999.

== Administrative divisions ==
As of 2012, this county is divided to one subdistrict, eight towns and two townships.

Subdistricts

- Mengyin Subdistrict (蒙阴街道)

Towns

- Changlu (常路镇)
- Daigu (岱崮镇)
- Tanbu (坦埠镇)
- Duozhuang (垛庄镇)
- Gaodu (高都镇)
- Yedian (野店镇)
- Taoxu (桃墟镇)
- Jiepai (界牌镇)

Townships

- Liancheng Township (联城乡)
- Jiuzhai Township (旧寨乡)

== Climate ==
Climate data for Mengyin, elevation 287 m (942 ft), (1991–2020 normals, extremes 1981–2010)
Month	Jan	Feb	Mar	Apr	May	Jun	Jul	Aug	Sep	Oct	Nov	Dec	Year
Record high °C (°F)	17.0 (62.6)	23.3 (73.9)	28.8 (83.8)	34.5 (94.1)	38.0 (100.4)	39.7 (103.5)	41.3 (106.3)	38.5 (101.3)	37.1 (98.8)	34.8 (94.6)	25.6 (78.1)	19.3 (66.7)	41.3 (106.3)
Mean daily maximum °C (°F)	4.2 (39.6)	7.7 (45.9)	14.0 (57.2)	21.1 (70.0)	26.6 (79.9)	30.0 (86.0)	31.0 (87.8)	30.0 (86.0)	26.6 (79.9)	20.9 (69.6)	13.0 (55.4)	6.1 (43.0)	19.3 (66.7)
Daily mean °C (°F)	−1.0 (30.2)	2.2 (36.0)	8.1 (46.6)	15.1 (59.2)	20.8 (69.4)	24.6 (76.3)	26.5 (79.7)	25.6 (78.1)	21.3 (70.3)	15.0 (59.0)	7.5 (45.5)	0.9 (33.6)	13.9 (57.0)
Mean daily minimum °C (°F)	−5.1 (22.8)	−2.2 (28.0)	3.1 (37.6)	9.7 (49.5)	15.4 (59.7)	19.8 (67.6)	23.0 (73.4)	22.1 (71.8)	17.0 (62.6)	10.2 (50.4)	3.1 (37.6)	−3.0 (26.6)	9.4 (49.0)
Record low °C (°F)	−18.9 (−2.0)	−15.4 (4.3)	−10.2 (13.6)	−3.1 (26.4)	3.7 (38.7)	10.7 (51.3)	16.3 (61.3)	12.1 (53.8)	6.0 (42.8)	−2.7 (27.1)	−11.1 (12.0)	−17.5 (0.5)	−18.9 (−2.0)
Average precipitation mm (inches)	8.9 (0.35)	16.1 (0.63)	18.2 (0.72)	33.8 (1.33)	61.5 (2.42)	103.7 (4.08)	222.5 (8.76)	203.4 (8.01)	63.2 (2.49)	30.0 (1.18)	30.6 (1.20)	12.2 (0.48)	804.1 (31.65)
Average precipitation days (≥ 0.1 mm)	3.2	4.0	4.0	5.8	7.3	8.8	12.4	12.1	7.4	5.3	5.0	3.5	78.8
Average snowy days	3.5	3.1	1.4	0.3	0	0	0	0	0	0	1.0	2.4	11.7
Average relative humidity (%)	59	56	50	52	56	64	77	78	71	66	64	62	63
Mean monthly sunshine hours	162.2	163.6	209.0	227.5	247.3	211.2	183.7	184.5	189.8	193.2	165.3	164.7	2,302
Percentage possible sunshine	52	53	56	58	57	49	42	45	52	56	54	55	52
Source: China Meteorological Administration
