= Flight 178 =

Flight 178 may refer to:

- Air France Flight 178, crashed on 1 September 1953
- Ural Airlines Flight 178, emergency landed in a field on 15 August 2019
