= 268 =

268 in various calendars
Gregorian calendar	268; CCLXVIII
Ab urbe condita	1021
Assyrian calendar	5018
Balinese saka calendar	189–190
Bengali calendar	−326 – −325
Berber calendar	1218
Buddhist calendar	812
Burmese calendar	−370
Byzantine calendar	5776–5777
Chinese calendar	丁亥年 (Fire Pig); 2965 or 2758 — to — 戊子年 (Earth Rat); 2966 or 2759
Coptic calendar	−16 – −15
Discordian calendar	1434
Ethiopian calendar	260–261
Hebrew calendar	4028–4029
- Hindu calendars
Vikram Samvat	324–325
Shaka Samvat	189–190
Kali Yuga	3368–3369
Holocene calendar	10268
Iranian calendar	354 BP – 353 BP
Islamic calendar	365 BH – 364 BH
Javanese calendar	147–148
Julian calendar	268; CCLXVIII
Korean calendar	2601
Minguo calendar	1644 before ROC 民前1644年
Nanakshahi calendar	−1200
Seleucid era	579/580 AG
Thai solar calendar	810–811
Tibetan calendar	མེ་མོ་ཕག་ལོ་ (female Fire-Boar); 394 or 13 or −759 — to — ས་ཕོ་བྱི་བ་ལོ་ (male Earth-Rat); 395 or 14 or −758

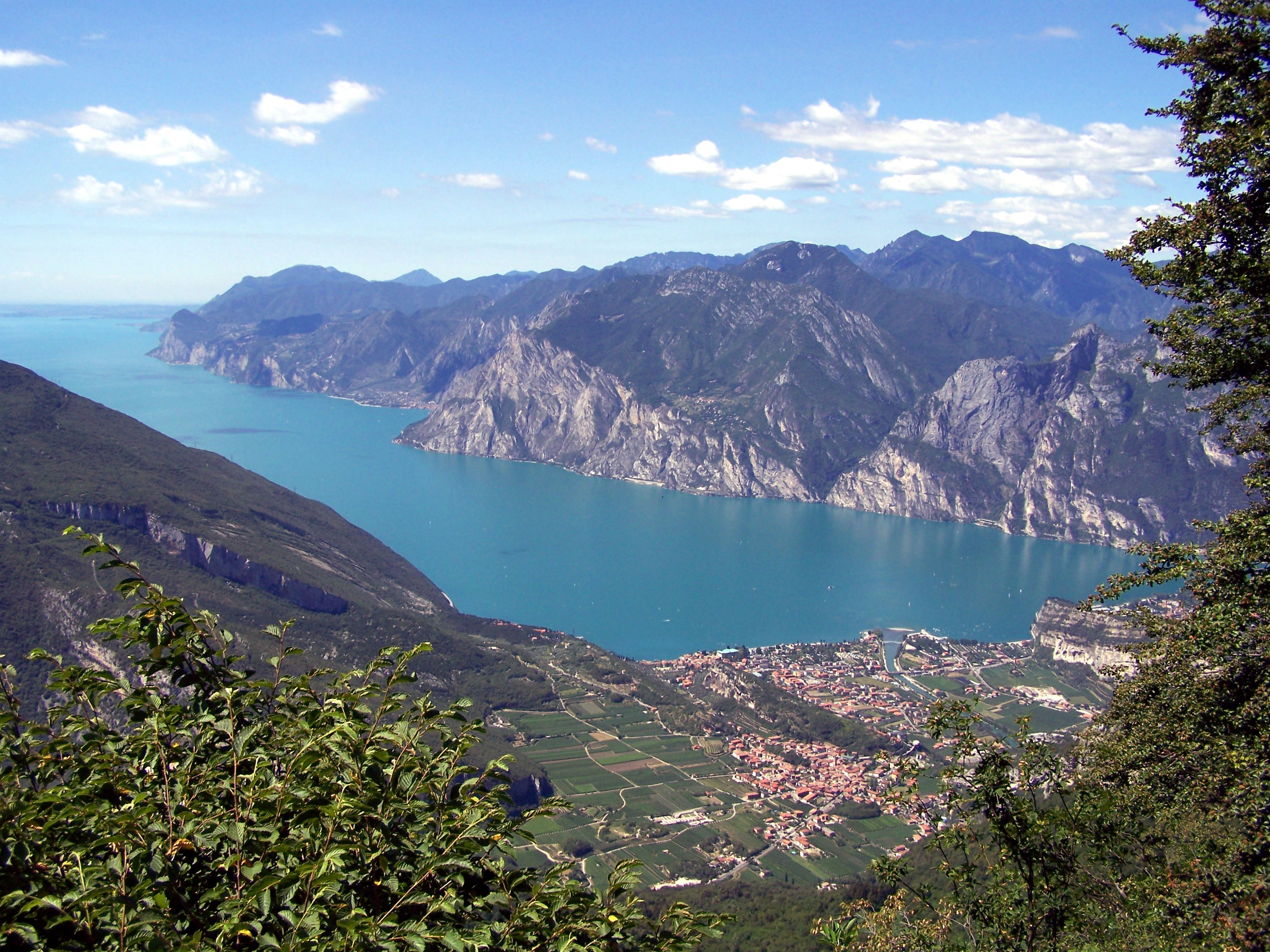
Lake Garda (Italy)

Year 268 (CCLXVIII) was a leap year starting on Wednesday of the Julian calendar. At the time, it was known in Rome as the Year of the Consulship of Paternus and Egnatius (or, less frequently, the year 1021 Ab urbe condita). The denomination 268 for this year has been used since the early medieval period when the Anno Domini calendar era became the prevalent method in Europe for naming years.

== Events ==
=== By place ===
==== Roman Empire ====
- September – Battle of Naissus: Emperor Gallienus, aided by Aurelian, defeats a Gothic coalition (50,000 warriors) near Naissus (Niš, modern Serbia).
- Gallienus is killed by his senior officers at Mediolanum (Milan) while besieging his rival Aureolus. Aureolus is murdered in turn by the Praetorian guard.
- Marcus Aurelius Claudius, who may have murdered Gallienus, becomes the new emperor of Rome and will reign as Claudius II.
- Claudius II asks the Senate to spare the lives of Gallienus's family and political supporters. Emperor Gallienus is deified and buried in a family tomb on the Appian Way.
- The Alamanni invade Italy north of the Po River.
- The Visigoths first appear as distinct people.
- November – Battle of Lake Benacus: A Roman army (35,000 men) under emperor Claudius II defeats the Germanic tribes of the Alamanni along the banks of Lake Garda.

==== Europe ====
- Victorinus is declared emperor of the Gallic Empire by the legions at Augusta Treverorum (Trier), following the murders of his predecessors. He is recognized by the provinces of Gaul and Britain, but Hispania might have reunited with the Roman Empire.

=== By Topic ===
==== Religion ====
- December 26 – Pope Dionysius dies in Rome after a 9-year reign and is succeeded by Felix I.

== Deaths ==
- December 26 – Dionysius, bishop of Rome
- Aureolus, Roman usurper
- Gallienus, Roman emperor (b. 218)
- Laelianus, Roman usurper
- Marcus Aurelius Marius, Roman emperor (Gaul)
- Postumus, Roman emperor of the Gallic Empire
