= Interstate 165 =

Interstate 165 is the designation for several highways in the United States, which are related to Interstate 65:

- Interstate 165 (Alabama), a spur that connects I-65 to downtown Mobile
- Interstate 165 (Kentucky), the designation of the former William H. Natcher Parkway
- Interstate 165 (Indiana), a canceled spur in Indianapolis
