= 175 =

175 may also refer to:

- 175 (number), the natural number following 174 and preceding 176
- 175 BC
- AD 175
- 175 (New Jersey bus)
- Paragraph 175
- UFC 175
- Interstate 175
- Delahaye 175
- 175 Andromache
- UNOH 175
