= Hua He =

Eastern Wu official and historian (219-278)

- 華覈

Right State Historian (右國史)
- In office ? – 275
- Monarch: Sun Hao

Dongguan Ling (東觀令)
- In office ? – 275
- Monarch: Sun Hao

Assistant in the Palace Secretariat (中書丞)
- In office before 263 – ?

Commandant of Agriculture (典農都尉)
- In office ?–?

Commandant of Shangyu (上虞尉)
- In office ?–?

Personal details
- Born: 219 Wujin District, Changzhou, Jiangsu
- Died: c. June 278 (aged 59)
- Occupation: Official, historian
- Courtesy name: Yongxian (永先)
- Peerage: Marquis of Xuling Village (徐陵亭侯)

Hua He (219 – c.June 278), courtesy name Yongxian, was an official and historian of the state of Eastern Wu during the late Three Kingdoms period of China. Hua He served mainly under the fourth and last Wu ruler, Sun Hao, but ended up being dismissed from office in 275 because he opposed Sun Hao's radical policies and outrageous behaviour. Hua He then went to live in seclusion as a result of this event.

== See also ==
- Lists of people of the Three Kingdoms
