= Liu Hong (astronomer) =

Chinese astronomer and official (129–210)

- 劉洪

Chancellor of Qucheng (曲城相)
- In office ?–?
- Monarch: Emperor Xian of Han

Administrator of Shanyang (山陽太守)
- In office ?–?
- Monarch: Emperor Xian of Han

Commandant of the East District of Kuaiji (會稽東部都尉)
- In office ?–?
- Monarch: Emperor Xian of Han

Gucheng Menhou (穀城門候)
- In office ?–?
- Monarch: Emperor Xian of Han

Personal details
- Born: 129 Mengyin County, Shandong
- Died: 210 (aged 81)
- Occupation: Astronomer, mathematician, politician
- Courtesy name: Yuanzhuo (元卓)
- Nickname: "Mathematical Sage" (算聖)

Liu Hong (129–210), courtesy name Yuanzhuo, was a Chinese astronomer, mathematician, and politician who lived in the late Eastern Han dynasty. He developed a work on predicting the passage of the moon which was in use during the Three Kingdoms period of China.

== Life ==
Liu Hong was from Mengyin County (蒙陰縣), Taishan Commandery, which is present-day Mengyin County, Shandong, and was a descendant of Liu Yu, the Prince of Lu, a son of Emperor Jing (r. 157–141 BCE). He developed an interest in astronomy at an early age. He was made an officer at the Imperial Astronomy around 160 CE which led to him writing the lost works Qi Yao Shu (七曜術; The Art of the Seven Planets) and Ba Yuan Shu (八元術; The Art of Eight Elements).

After the death of his father, Liu Hong retired for a short time but then returned to his work, collaborating with Cai Yong on the Qian Xiang Li (乾象曆; Qian Xiang Calendar). This was considered so advanced for its time that it was adopted by the Han government immediately. The calendar predicted the movement of the moon, the first time such considerations had been made in China. This system marked the first appearance of the argument of periapsis, a means to calculate the syzygy (the calculation between three celestial bodies), and a means of charting the moon through the seasons. His means of establishing the accuracy of the calendar was by the detection of eclipses.

This system replaced one which had been used by the Han dynasty since 85 CE, and following the end of the Han dynasty and beginning of the Three Kingdoms period, it was adopted by the Eastern Wu state until China was re-unified under the Jin dynasty in 280 CE. In 179 CE, he was asked by the Imperial Secretariat to consider proposals made by a private scholar called Wang Han regarding lunar calendars, but he did not support those proposals. A year later, the Minister of Ceremonies assigned him to review alternative means of calculating eclipses.

Throughout his service under the Han government, Liu Hong held various positions, including: Internuncio (謁者), gucheng menhou (穀城門候), Commandant of the East District of Kuaiji (會稽東部都尉), Administrator of Shanyang (山陽太守) and Chancellor of Qucheng (曲城相).
