= 168 BC =

168 BC in various calendars
- Gregorian calendar: 168 BC; CLXVIII BC
- Ab urbe condita: 586
- Ancient Egypt era: XXXIII dynasty, 156
- Pharaoh: Ptolemy VI Philometor, 13
- Ancient Greek Olympiad (summer): 153rd Olympiad (victor)¹
- Assyrian calendar: 4583
- Balinese saka calendar: N/A
- Bengali calendar: −761 – −760
- Berber calendar: 783
- Buddhist calendar: 377
- Burmese calendar: −805
- Byzantine calendar: 5341–5342
- Chinese calendar: 壬申年 (Water Monkey); 2530 or 2323 — to — 癸酉年 (Water Rooster); 2531 or 2324
- Coptic calendar: −451 – −450
- Discordian calendar: 999
- Ethiopian calendar: −175 – −174
- Hebrew calendar: 3593–3594
- Hindu calendars
- Vikram Samvat: −111 – −110
- Shaka Samvat: N/A
- Kali Yuga: 2933–2934
- Holocene calendar: 9833
- Iranian calendar: 789 BP – 788 BP
- Islamic calendar: 813 BH – 812 BH
- Javanese calendar: N/A
- Julian calendar: N/A
- Korean calendar: 2166
- Minguo calendar: 2079 before ROC 民前2079年
- Nanakshahi calendar: −1635
- Seleucid era: 144/145 AG
- Thai solar calendar: 375–376
- Tibetan calendar: ཆུ་ཕོ་སྤྲེ་ལོ་ (male Water-Monkey) −41 or −422 or −1194 — to — ཆུ་མོ་བྱ་ལོ་ (female Water-Bird) −40 or −421 or −1193

Battle of Pydna (Greece)

Year 168 BC was a year of the pre-Julian Roman calendar. At the time it was known as the Year of the Consulship of Macedonicus and Crassus (or, less frequently, year 586 Ab urbe condita). The denomination 168 BC for this year has been used since the early medieval period, when the Anno Domini calendar era became the prevalent method in Europe for naming years.

== Events ==
=== By place ===
==== Albania ====
- The king of Illyria, Gentius, is defeated at Scodra by a Roman force under Lucius Anicius Gallus and then brought to Rome as a captive to be interned in Iguvium. This loss removes Illyria as an important ally for Macedonia and effectively weakens Perseus of Macedon in his battle with Rome.
- The Roman general, Lucius Aemilius Paulus, is elected consul and arrives in Thessaly to lead the Roman army which has been trapped by Perseus' forces.
- June 22 – The Battle of Pydna (in southern Macedonia) gives Roman forces under Lucius Aemilius Paulus a crushing victory over Perseus and his Macedonian forces, thus ending the Third Macedonian War. Perseus is captured by the Romans and will spend the rest of his life in captivity at Alba Fucens, near Rome.
- The Macedonian kingdom is broken up by the Romans into four smaller states, and all the Greek cities which have offered aid to Macedonia, even just in words, are punished. The Romans take hundreds of prisoners from the leading families of Macedonia, including the historian Polybius.

==== Egypt ====
- The joint rulers of Egypt, Ptolemy VI, Ptolemy VIII Euergetes II and their sister Cleopatra II send a renewed request to Rome for aid.

==== Seleucid Empire ====
- The fleet of the Seleucid king Antiochus IV wins a victory off Cyprus, whose governor then surrenders the island to him.
- Antiochus IV then invades Egypt again and occupies Lower Egypt and his forces camp outside Alexandria. However, the Roman ambassador in Alexandria, Gaius Popillius Laenas, intervenes. He presents Antiochus IV with an ultimatum that he evacuate Egypt and Cyprus immediately. Antiochus, taken by surprise, asks for time to consider. Popillius, however, draws a circle in the earth (i.e. "a line in the sand") around the king with his walking stick and demands an unequivocal answer before Antiochus leaves the circle. Fearing the consequences of a war with Rome, the king agrees to comply with the ambassador's demands. In return, the Romans agree that Antiochus IV can retain southern Syria, to which Egypt has laid claim, thus enabling Antiochus IV to preserve the territorial integrity of his realm.
- Jason removes Menelaus as High Priest in Jerusalem, which Antiochus IV regards as an affront to his majesty.

== Births ==
- Tiberius Gracchus, Roman politician who would create turmoil in the Republic through his attempts to legislate agrarian reforms in the Roman Republic (d. 133 BC)

== Deaths ==
- Caecilius Statius, Roman comic poet, admirer and imitator of the Greek playwright Menander (b. c. 219 BC)
- Jia Yi, Chinese statesman and poet (b. 200 BC)
- Xin Zhui, wife of Li Cang (利蒼), the Marquis of Dai and Chancellor of Changsha Kingdom, during the Western Han dynasty of ancient China. (b. c. 217 BC)
