= 216 =

216 in various calendars
- Gregorian calendar: 216; CCXVI
- Ab urbe condita: 969
- Assyrian calendar: 4966
- Balinese saka calendar: 137–138
- Bengali calendar: −378 – −377
- Berber calendar: 1166
- Buddhist calendar: 760
- Burmese calendar: −422
- Byzantine calendar: 5724–5725
- Chinese calendar: 乙未年 (Wood Goat); 2913 or 2706 — to — 丙申年 (Fire Monkey); 2914 or 2707
- Coptic calendar: −68 – −67
- Discordian calendar: 1382
- Ethiopian calendar: 208–209
- Hebrew calendar: 3976–3977
- Hindu calendars
- Vikram Samvat: 272–273
- Shaka Samvat: 137–138
- Kali Yuga: 3316–3317
- Holocene calendar: 10216
- Iranian calendar: 406 BP – 405 BP
- Islamic calendar: 419 BH – 417 BH
- Javanese calendar: 93–94
- Julian calendar: 216; CCXVI
- Korean calendar: 2549
- Minguo calendar: 1696 before ROC 民前1696年
- Nanakshahi calendar: −1252
- Seleucid era: 527/528 AG
- Thai solar calendar: 758–759
- Tibetan calendar: ཤིང་མོ་ལུག་ལོ་ (female Wood-Sheep); 342 or −39 or −811 — to — མེ་ཕོ་སྤྲེ་ལོ་ (male Fire-Monkey); 343 or −38 or −810

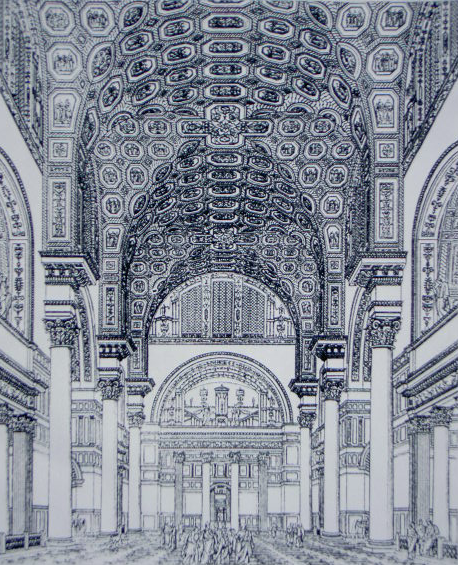
The Baths of Caracalla (reconstructive drawing from 1899)

Year 216 (CCXVI) was a leap year starting on Monday of the Julian calendar. At the time, it was known as the Year of the Consulship of Sabinus and Anullinus (or, less frequently, year 969 Ab urbe condita). The denomination 216 for this year has been used since the early medieval period, when the Anno Domini calendar era became the prevalent method in Europe for naming years.

== Events ==
=== By place ===
==== Roman Empire ====
- The Baths of Caracalla in Rome are completed with public baths (Thermae), reading rooms, auditoriums, running tracks, and public gardens that cover 20 acres.
- Emperor Caracalla tricks the Parthians by accepting a marriage proposal. He slaughters his bride and the wedding guests after the celebrations.
- Caracalla provokes a war with Artabanus V (of Parthia) to imitate his idol Alexander the Great. He crosses the Tigris, destroys towns and spoils the tombs of Arbela. The Roman army annexes Armenia.
- The basilica of Leptis Magna, ordered by Septimius Severus, is completed.

==== China ====
- Chinese warlord Cao Cao is made a vassal and ruler of Wei (Former Wei) by Emperor Xian, the last ruler of the Han Dynasty.

=== By topic ===
==== Religion ====
- Mithraism, which had begun in Persia, is on course to be adopted by many Roman soldiers serving in Asia.

== Births ==
- Mani, prophet and founder of Manichaeism (d. 274)

== Deaths ==
- Clement of Alexandria, Greek theologian (approximate date)
- Cui Yan (or Jigui), Chinese official and politician (b. 165)
- Huo Jun (or Zhongmiao), Chinese general and official
- Mao Jie (or Xiaoxian), Chinese official and politician
- Narcissus of Jerusalem, patriarch of Jerusalem
- Pantaenus, Greek theologian (approximate date)
- Zhang Lu, Chinese warlord and religious leader
