= AD 165 =

165 in various calendars
- Gregorian calendar: 165; CLXV
- Ab urbe condita: 918
- Assyrian calendar: 4915
- Balinese saka calendar: 86–87
- Bengali calendar: −429 – −428
- Berber calendar: 1115
- Buddhist calendar: 709
- Burmese calendar: −473
- Byzantine calendar: 5673–5674
- Chinese calendar: 甲辰年 (Wood Dragon); 2862 or 2655 — to — 乙巳年 (Wood Snake); 2863 or 2656
- Coptic calendar: −119 – −118
- Discordian calendar: 1331
- Ethiopian calendar: 157–158
- Hebrew calendar: 3925–3926
- Hindu calendars
- Vikram Samvat: 221–222
- Shaka Samvat: 86–87
- Kali Yuga: 3265–3266
- Holocene calendar: 10165
- Iranian calendar: 457 BP – 456 BP
- Islamic calendar: 471 BH – 470 BH
- Javanese calendar: 41–42
- Julian calendar: 165; CLXV
- Korean calendar: 2498
- Minguo calendar: 1747 before ROC 民前1747年
- Nanakshahi calendar: −1303
- Seleucid era: 476/477 AG
- Thai solar calendar: 707–708
- Tibetan calendar: ཤིང་ཕོ་འབྲུག་ལོ་ (male Wood-Dragon); 291 or −90 or −862 — to — ཤིང་མོ་སྦྲུལ་ལོ་ (female Wood-Snake); 292 or −89 or −861

Year 165 (CLXV) was a common year starting on Monday of the Julian calendar. At the time, it was known as the Year of the Consulship of Orfitus and Pudens (or, less frequently, year 918 Ab urbe condita). The denomination 165 for this year has been used since the early medieval period, when the Anno Domini calendar era became the prevalent method in Europe for naming years.

== Events ==
=== By place ===
==== Roman Empire ====
- A Roman military expedition under Avidius Cassius is successful against Parthia, capturing Artaxata, Seleucia on the Tigris, and Ctesiphon. The Parthians sue for peace.
- Antonine Plague: A pandemic breaks out in Rome, after the Roman army returns from Parthia. The plague significantly depopulates the Roman Empire and China.
- Legio II Italica is levied by Emperor Marcus Aurelius.
- Dura-Europos is taken by the Romans.
- The Romans establish a garrison at Doura Europos on the Euphrates, a control point for the commercial route to the Persian Gulf.
- Avidius Cassius takes Nisibis, and conquers the north of Mesopotamia.
- Marcus Aurelius creates 4 legal districts (iuridici) in Italy (5 if Rome is included).

==== Asia ====
- Sindae becomes ruler of the Korean kingdom of Goguryeo.

=== By topic ===
==== Religion ====
- The philosopher Justin of Nablus is executed in Rome as a Christian.
- Discourse to the Greek (Oratio ad Graecos), by the Syrian Tatian, is the first treatise on the evils of paganism in Christian literature.

== Births ==
- Annia Faustina, Roman noblewoman (d. 218)
- Marcus Opellius Severus Macrinus, Roman emperor (d. 218)
- Mi Zhu (or Zizhong), Chinese official and advisor (d. 221)
- Shi Hui, Chinese official and statesman (d. 227)
- Tiberius Claudius Cleobulus, Roman politician (d. 213)

== Deaths ==
- Appian, Greek historian and writer (approximate date)
- Chadea, Korean ruler of Goguryeo (b. AD 71)
- Claudius Ptolemaeus, Greek astronomer (approximate date)
- Deng Mengnü (or Bo Mengnü), Chinese empress
- Elpinice, daughter of Herodes Atticus (b. AD 142)
- Justin Martyr, Christian apologist (b. AD 100)
- Peregrinus Proteus, Greek philosopher (b. AD 95)
- Taejodae, Korean ruler of Goguryeo (b. AD 47)
