= Cui Yan =

Chinese politician (c. 160 – c. 216)

- 崔琰

Commandant of the Capital (中尉)
- In office 216
- Monarch: Emperor Xian of Han
- Chancellor: Cao Cao

Master of Writing (尚書)
- In office 216
- Monarch: Emperor Xian of Han
- Chancellor: Cao Cao

Personal details
- Born: c.160 (Note: Cui Yan's biography in Sanguozhi recorded that he was 29-30 years old (by East Asian reckoning) when the Yellow Turban rebels from Xu Province attacked Beihai Commandery; vol.59 of Zizhi Tongjian dated the resurgence of the Yellow Turban rebels in Xu Province to the 10th month of the 5th year of the Zhongping era; the month corresponds to 7 Nov to 6 Dec 188 in the Julian calendar. The Yellow Turbans' attack on Beihai very likely occurred before 190; per Tao Qian's biography in Sanguozhi, he had defeated the Yellow Turbans in Xu Province before Dong Zhuo's coup.) Gucheng County, Hebei
- Died: 216
- Relations: see Cui clan of Qinghe
- Occupation: Politician
- Courtesy name: Jigui (季珪)

Cui Yan (c.160 – c.216), courtesy name Jigui, was a Chinese politician serving under the warlord Cao Cao during the late Eastern Han dynasty of China. In his early life, he served briefly in the local district office before leaving home to study under the tutelage of the Confucian scholar Zheng Xuan. In the late 190s, Cui Yan became a subordinate of the northern warlord Yuan Shao but did not make any significant achievements under the latter, who ignored his suggestions. Following Yuan Shao's death in 202, Cui Yan was imprisoned when he refused to help either of Yuan's sons—Yuan Shang and Yuan Tan—in their struggle over their father's territories. After he was freed, Cui Yan came to serve under Cao Cao, the de facto head of the Han central government. Throughout his years of service under Cao Cao, Cui Yan performed his duties faithfully and diligently, maintaining law and order within his bureau and recommending talents to join the civil service. In 216, in an incident widely regarded as a case of grievous injustice, Cui Yan was accused of defaming Cao Cao in a letter and ended up being stripped of his post, thrown into prison and subsequently forced to commit suicide.

== Early life ==
Cui Yan was from Dongwucheng County (東武城縣), Qinghe Commandery, Ji Province, which is around present-day Gucheng County, Hebei. He was born in the Cui family of Qinghe Commandery, a political family which rose to prominence during the Sui and Tang dynasties later. In his youth, he was known to be plain, dull and lacking in communication skills, but he was very interested in swordsmanship and military arts. When he was 22 years old, he was nominated by the local district office to be a judicial officer, (Note: Cui Yan's appointment was a Director (正) under a Minister of Justice (廷尉).) for which he was so grateful that he started reading books such as the Analects and Han Shi (韓詩). (Note: The Han Shi (韓詩; literally poems of Han) was written by Han Ying (韓嬰), an academician who lived in the early Western Han dynasty, as an addendum to the Classic of Poetry.)

Six years later, at the age of 28, Cui Yan befriended Gongsun Fang (公孫方) and others and they studied together under the tutelage of the Confucian scholar Zheng Xuan. However, in c. November 188, before Cui Yan could even complete his first year of studies, the Yellow Turban rebels from Xu Province attacked Beihai Commandery, where Zheng Xuan conducted his classes, so Zheng and his students fled east to Mount Buqi (不其山; northwest of Mount Lao) to evade chaos. Even so, the rebellion had resulted in food shortages, so Zheng Xuan had no choice but to send his students away. After leaving Mount Buqi, Cui Yan could not return to Qinghe Commandery because rebel forces and bandits were rampant in the region and the roads leading west were blocked. He wandered around Qing, Xu, Yan and Yu provinces and visited several places, including Shouchun (壽春; present-day Shou County, Anhui), Lake Tai and the northern bank of the Yangtze River. After four years, he returned home and spent his time playing music and writing calligraphy.

== Service under Yuan Shao ==
Around the late 190s, (Note: Cui Yan's biography in the Sanguozhi mentioned that Yuan Shao held the nominal appointment of General-in-Chief (大將軍) under the Han imperial court when he recruited Cui to serve him. Cao Cao's biography in the Sanguozhi mentioned that Cao was initially appointed General-in-Chief by the Han imperial court in 196 but he later declined the post and offered it to Yuan Shao instead. (See Cao Cao#Receiving Emperor Xian for details.)) the northern warlord Yuan Shao heard of Cui Yan and recruited the latter to serve under him. At the time, due to widespread chaos and famine, many soldiers had resorted to crime as a means of survival and some started robbing and plundering tombs. Cui Yan urged Yuan Shao to maintain good discipline among his troops, saying, "In the past, Sun Qing once said: 'If the soldiers in an army are ill disciplined, the army's prowess will be weak. It will not achieve victory even if it was led by either Tang of Shang or King Wu of Zhou.' As of now, the roads are covered with the remains of the dead and the people have yet to see your virtuous deeds. You should order all commandery and county officials to ensure that the dead are properly buried, so as to showcase your sympathy and compassion by following the benevolent acts of King Wen of Zhou." Yuan Shao appointed Cui Yan as a Cavalry Commandant (騎都尉).

In 200 CE, when Yuan Shao was preparing for a campaign against a rival warlord Cao Cao, he set up military garrisons at Liyang (黎陽) and Yan Ford (延津). Cui Yan attempted to dissuade him from going to war by saying, "The Emperor is in Xu (Note: Referring to Xu (許; present-day Xuchang, Henan), the Han capital, which was under Cao Cao's control.) and the people's hopes are with him. Why don't you faithfully perform your duties by defending the border and maintaining peace within your jurisdiction?" Yuan Shao refused to listen to Cui Yan and insisted on attacking Cao Cao, but ended up being defeated by Cao at the decisive Battle of Guandu later that year. After Yuan Shao died in 202, his sons Yuan Tan and Yuan Shang formed their own military forces and started fighting for control over their father's territories in northern China. Both Yuan Tan and Yuan Shang wanted Cui Yan on their side, but Cui refused to help either of them and claimed that he was ill. As a consequence, he was imprisoned by Yuan Shang, but was later saved by Yin Kui (陰夔) and Chen Lin.

== Service under Cao Cao ==
In 205, after Cao Cao had defeated the Yuan brothers and taken over Ji Province, he wanted to recruit Cui Yan to serve as an aide-de-camp (別駕從事) under him. He told the latter, "According to official records, there are 300,000 troops under my command now. (Ji Province) is indeed a large province." Cui Yan replied, "The Empire is in a state of chaos and the Nine Provinces are divided, while the Yuan brothers fight among themselves and the bodies of the dead are scattered throughout the wilderness. The people have yet to see how your forces will bring benevolent rule and relief aid to them and liberate them from war and disaster, but now the first thing you do is to check the records for the numbers of troops and military equipment you've obtained. Is this what the people in this province expect of you?" Those present at the scene were all startled by Cui Yan's response. Cao Cao's facial expression changed and he thanked Cui Yan for his advice.

In the following year, when Cao Cao left Ji Province to attack Yuan Shao's nephew Gao Gan in Bing Province, he left his son Cao Pi in charge of Ye, the capital of Ji Province, and instructed Cui Yan to mentor Cao Pi. Once, when Cao Pi went on a hunting excursion to enjoy himself, Cui Yan wrote a long letter to him, haranguing the former on overly indulging in personal pleasures and neglecting his duties. Cao Pi later sent a reply, stating that he had destroyed his hunting equipment and thanking Cui Yan for his lecture.

In 208, when Cao Cao became the Han Chancellor, Cui Yan was appointed as a Senior Clerk in the East and West Bureaus (東西曹掾屬). The order from the Han imperial court conferring the appointment on Cui Yan read, "You possess the style of Boyi and the integrity of Shi Yu (史魚). (Note: Shi Yu (史魚) was an official of the Wey state in the Spring and Autumn period. He was known for being very frank and candid in giving advice to the Duke of Wey.) Corrupt officials will mend their ways out of admiration for you while men of valour will strive harder after being inspired by you. You will be serving as a role model in these times, therefore you are hereby appointed to the East Bureau."

In 216, Cao Cao was granted the title of a vassal king, King of Wei, by Emperor Xian of Han and was allowed to set up an autonomous vassal kingdom, which was nominally still under the Han dynasty. Cui Yan was appointed as a Master of Writing (尚書) in Cao Cao's vassal kingdom. At the time, Cao Cao had yet to designate one of his sons as his heir apparent and he was considering Cao Zhi, so he secretly sought the opinions of his subjects, including Cui Yan. Cui Yan openly replied, "According to Confucian ethics, a man's heir apparent should be his eldest son. Besides, Cao Pi is kind, filial and intelligent, so he is a suitable successor. I fully support him until my death." (Note: Cao Cao's official spouse, Lady Bian, bore him four sons. Cao Pi was the eldest while Cao Zhi was the third.) Cao Cao was very impressed with Cui Yan for adhering to Confucian rules of propriety (and succession). (Note: Cui Yan's niece (daughter of his elder brother), Lady Cui, was Cao Zhi's wife, so Cao Cao expected Cui Yan to support Cao Zhi, but Cui Yan followed the rules and endorsed Cao Pi (the eldest son) instead. Once, Lady Cui wore embroidered clothes to a ceremony and was seen by Cao Cao. Cao Cao later forced her to commit suicide because she violated a rule with her dress code.) He promoted Cui Yan to Commandant of the Capital (中尉) later.

== Death ==
Cui Yan once recommended Yang Xun (楊訓), who was from Julu Commandery, to serve in the government. Although Yang Xun's abilities were not up to expectations, Cui Yan still nominated him on the grounds of excellent moral conduct. Cao Cao heeded Cui Yan's suggestion and employed Yang Xun. After Emperor Xian enfeoffed Cao Cao as a vassal king, Yang Xun wrote a memorial to the imperial court, glorifying Cao's achievements in his military campaigns and showering Cao with words of praise. Yang Xun was ridiculed by many people for his flattering behaviour; Cui Yan was also cast in a negative light because he was deemed as having recommended a sycophant to join the civil service. After the incident, Cui Yan read Yang Xun's memorial and wrote to him,

"I have read your memorial. It is good. That is all. Time, time. There will be changes as time passes."

According to the historian Chen Shou, who wrote Cui Yan's biography in the Records of the Three Kingdoms (Sanguozhi), Cui's true intention in writing those remarks was to mock Yang Xun's critics for being too eager to disparage Yang without making any careful consideration. However, Cui Yan was accused of displaying arrogance and defaming Cao Cao in his letter. Cao Cao angrily said, "There is a saying, 'I gave birth to a daughter, that is all.' 'That is all' is not a complimentary phrase. He meant disrespect when he wrote, 'There will be changes as time passes.'" (Note: In traditional Chinese culture, sons are regarded more highly than daughters, so the birth of a girl was sometimes seen as something unimportant and not worthy of celebration or even mention. As such, the "that is all" remark was made in a dismissive or patronising tone similar to the use of words along the lines of "merely", "simply", "no more than", "only so", etc. It was therefore not seen as a complimentary phrase.) Cao Cao then had Cui Yan stripped off his post, thrown into prison, and ordered to perform hard labour. Later, he sent agents to observe Cui Yan in prison and they reported that Cui continued to remain defiant. Cao Cao issued an official statement, "Even though Cui Yan is serving a sentence, he still receives high numbers of visitors in prison. He glares at them straight in the eye as if he has grievances." He then forced Cui Yan to commit suicide.

The Weilüe recorded more details of the events leading to Cui Yan's death. It mentioned that Cui Yan's letter to Yang Xun fell into the hands of Cui Yan's enemies, who accused him of defaming Cao Cao. Cao Cao felt that Cui Yan was discrediting him so he had the latter arrested, imprisoned, head shaved, and sent to perform hard labour. Later, Cui Yan's enemies told Cao Cao, "When Cui Yan serves his sentence, he glares at people straight in the eye as if he is filled with resentment." Cao Cao believed them and wanted Cui Yan to die so he sent an official to inform Cui, "You've three days to live." Cui Yan did not understand what the official meant and he continued to live on for several days. When the official reported to Cao Cao that Cui Yan was alive and well, Cao furiously said, "Cui Yan is forcing me to use the sword on him!" The official went to see Cui Yan again and explained to the latter that Cao Cao actually wanted him to kill himself within three days. Cui Yan said, "How silly of me. I didn't know that he actually wanted me to do this." He committed suicide after that. The Fuzi recorded that he was framed by Ding Yi, a supporter of Cao Zhi.

Cui Yan's execution was widely considered as unfair. In his work, Yi Zhongtian proposed three reasons why Cao Cao wanted to have Cui Yan killed:

1. Cao Cao's infamous skepticism got the better out of him in this case. Cao had long been suspicious of his own subordinates since many of them actually disagreed with Cao's moves to take the supreme power. Cao Cao especially distrusted the "morally perfect" people since their contemporary "moral codes" included the loyalty and commitment for the existing Han dynasty, not for Cao Cao's rise to power. Cao Cao also disliked the contemporary clans of "intelligentsia nobility" (士族) whom he had to politically cooperate with but could never completely rely on. Cui Yan unfortunately belonged to both categories.
2. Cao Cao had been upset about being publicly reprimanded by Cui Yan after the victories in Ji Province years ago.
3. Cao Cao was actually displeased of how Cui Yan openly expressed his opinion in the choice of heir apparent despite Cao Cao's aim to sought the opinion only in secret. In contemporary politics when hidden moves were common, the public statements were occasionally believed as only "half-truth", and Cui Yan's honesty, although genuine, under the distrustful eyes of Cao Cao were interpreted as having a hidden agenda. Moreover, Cui Yan's openness could be seen as a moral blow to Cao Cao's secret way of surveying, which strongly upset Cao Cao.

== Physical appearance ==
Cui Yan was described as having a lofty and dignified bearing, a clear voice, sparkling eyes, and a beard four chi long. He commanded much respect from his colleagues in the Han imperial court with his august appearance and demeanour, and even Cao Cao admired and feared him.

== Anecdotes ==
Once, when Cao Cao was about to meet an emissary from the Xiongnu, he felt that he looked ugly and might not be able to command respect so he ordered Cui Yan to impersonate him while he carried a sword and stood beside Cui, pretending to be a bodyguard. After the meeting, Cao Cao sent someone to ask the Xiongnu emissary, "What are your thoughts about the King of Wei?" The Xiongnu emissary replied, "The King looks handsome and extraordinary. However, the man who was carrying a sword and standing beside him is a real hero." Cao Cao had the emissary killed when he heard that.

Cui Yan was a close friend of Sima Lang. When Sima Lang's younger brother Sima Yi was still young, Cui Yan once told Sima Lang, "Your younger brother is intelligent, perceptive and strong. He'll surpass you in the future." Sima Lang disagreed with Cui Yan and they often debated about this.

Cui Yan's younger cousin, Cui Lin, was not highly regarded when he was young. However, Cui Yan said, "He's what we call a 'late bloomer'. He'll go far in the future." When Sun Li and Lu Yu first came to serve under Cao Cao, Cui Yan said, "Sun Li is energetic, strong and decisive, while Lu Yu is alert, sensible and resilient. Both of them are capable of shouldering great responsibilities in the future." As Cui Yan foresaw, Cui Lin, Sun Li and Lu Yu rose to prominence later and they became important officials in the state of Cao Wei (established by Cao Pi) during the Three Kingdoms period.

Two of Cui Yan's ex-classmates, Gongsun Fang (公孫方) and Song Jie (宋階), who studied together with him under Zheng Xuan, died early. Cui Yan adopted their children and treated them as if they were his own children.

== Appraisal ==
The Xianxian Xingzhuang (先賢行狀) mentioned, "Cui Yan was noble and virtuous, possessed foresight, promoted ethics, and stood dignified in the imperial court. According to early records from Wei, his bureau was orderly and free of corruption throughout the ten years or so when he held office. He was well versed in literary and military arts, and had recommended many talents to serve in the government. [...]"

Chen Shou, who wrote Cui Yan's biography in the Sanguozhi, commented on Cui as follows, "Cui Yan's moral character was the most sound, [...] yet they were unable to avoid being killed. What a pity!" After writing about Cui Yan's death, Chen added: "Cao Cao was a suspicious person. He killed those whom he could not tolerate or bore grudges against because they had shown disrespect towards him. Among his victims – Kong Rong, Xu You, Lou Gui and others – Cui Yan is the most lamented. Until today, Cui Yan's case is still regarded as one of grave injustice."

During the reign of the Wei emperor Cao Rui in the Three Kingdoms period, Cui Lin (Cui Yan's cousin) and Chen Qun had a discussion on famous people from Ji Province. Cui Lin felt that Cui Yan was the most outstanding among all of them, but Chen Qun disagreed, saying that "intelligence alone is insufficient for a person to survive". Cui Lin replied, "We only get to see a real man by sheer coincidence. People like you only consider obtaining fame and fortune the best achievements in life."

== See also ==
- Lists of people of the Three Kingdoms
