= Cui Hao =

Chinese Northern Wei minister (died 450)

Cui Hao (Chinese: 崔浩) (died 5 July 450), courtesy name Boyuan (伯淵), was a Master of Writings (尚书; shangshu) of the Xianbei-led Northern Wei dynasty of China. Largely because of Cui's counsel, Emperor Taiwu of Northern Wei was able to unify northern China, ending the Sixteen Kingdoms era and, along with the Liu Song dynasty in southern China, entering the Northern and Southern dynasties era. Also because of the influence of Cui, who was a devout Taoist, Emperor Taiwu became a devout Taoist as well. However, in 450, over reasons that are not completely clear to this day, Emperor Taiwu had Cui and his cadet branch executed.

== During Emperor Daowu's and Emperor Mingyuan's reigns ==
It is not known when Cui Hao was born. He was the oldest son of the ethnic Han Cui Hong, (Note: In Book of Wei, Cui Hong was referred to by his courtesy name of "Xuanbo" (玄伯) as his name was the same as Emperor Xiaowen of Northern Wei and so violated naming taboo. He should not be confused with the compiler of the Spring and Autumn Annals of the Sixteen Kingdoms, who has a similar-sounding name. The compiler of Shiliuguo Chunqiu has a biography in vol.67 of Book of Wei, and his courtesy name was Yanluan (彦鸾).) a descendant of Cui Lin and a high-level official under Emperor Daowu, who carried the title of Marquess of Baima. His mother was a granddaughter of Lu Chen, son of Lu Zhi. Thus, Cui Hao was also a second cousin of Lu Xun, who was another great-grandson of Lu Chen.

In Cui Hao's youth, he was said to have studied a broad number of books, but was particularly known for his literary abilities, as well as his astrological prophecies. The first historical reference to Cui Hao was in 409, when he was a low-level official in Emperor Daowu's administration. At that time, Emperor Daowu was often violent and arbitrary in his actions, because of poisoning from pills he received from alchemists, and the imperial officials often found excuses to stay away from him lest they be stricken by his anger. However, Cui Hong and Cui Hao were described as having served Emperor Daowu diligently despite this, and they were among the few officials who never received any punishment from him.

Later in November 409, Emperor Daowu was assassinated by his son Tuoba Shao (拓跋紹) the Prince of Qinghe, who then tried to take over the regime, but was defeated and killed by his older brother Tuoba Si the Crown Prince, who took the throne as Emperor Mingyuan. During Tuoba Shao's coup, he tried to get officials to follow him by awarding them with many things, but Cui Hong declined them all, and Cui Hong was therefore praised by Emperor Mingyuan and created the Duke of Baima. In 414, Cui Hao started teaching Emperor Mingyuan the mystical texts I Ching and Hong Fan (洪範), and because of this and the accuracy of a number of Cui Hao's predictions, Emperor Mingyuan began to trust him greatly. In 415, during the middle of a severe famine, it was at the advice of Cui Hao and Zhou Dan (周澹) that Emperor Mingyuan stopped the plan of moving the capital from Pingcheng (平城, in modern Datong, Shanxi) to Yecheng, as Cui and Zhou were concerned that moving the capital would quickly expose the Xianbei's numerical inferiority to the Han, leading to rebellions. Later that year, when an unusual astrological sign that portended the destruction of a state appeared, it was Cui Hao who made the prediction that it foretold Later Qin's destruction, and after Later Qin fell in 417, not only the emperor but the other officials became impressed at Cui Hao's abilities.

However, one matter at which Emperor Mingyuan did not listen to Cui Hao was in his attempt to stop the Jin general Liu Yu from destroying Later Qin, as his wife Consort Yao was a sister of the Later Qin emperor Yao Hong. In 416, when Liu Yu tried to advance his main fleet west on the Yellow River, Emperor Mingyuan ordered his army to harass the Jin fleet, against Cui's suggestion that doing so would make Northern Wei bear the brunt of Jin attack. Indeed, after some limited success in Northern Wei's harassment campaign, Liu Yu had his general Ding Wu (丁旿) land on the northern bank and deal Northern Wei a major defeat, before resuming the advancement. This ended Emperor Mingyuan's attempt to save Later Qin, and he regretted not listening to Cui in this matter. It was also around this time that Cui Hao made the perceptive observation that after Liu Yu destroyed Later Qin, he would return to the Jin capital Jiankang and usurp the throne, and that the troops that he left to hold Later Qin territory would become trapped. He also suggested that Northern Wei should be patient, and that one day the territory would be Northern Wei's. Pleased with Cui's analysis, Emperor Mingyuan awarded him wine and salt, stating to him, "Your words are just as like wine and salt, and therefore I want to share these with you." In 418, after another astrological sign appeared showing the end of a state, Cui publicly stated that it meant the end of Jin, and when Liu Yu seized the Jin throne in 419 and established Liu Song, Cui was shown to be correct. Also in 419, Cui Hao's father Cui Hong died. Cui Hao inherited his father's title of Duke of Baima.

In 422, Emperor Mingyuan suffered a major illness, apparently caused by medicines that alchemists had given him that were supposedly capable of extending lifespans. He consulted Cui Hao on what he should do to prepare for events after his death. Cui Hao predicted that he would recover, but advised him to create his oldest son, 14-year-old Tuoba Tao the Prince of Taiping, crown prince, and then transfer some of the authorities to the crown prince so that his own burdens could be lessened. The senior official Baba Song (拔拔嵩) also agreed, and Emperor Mingyuan created Tuoba Tao crown prince, and further had Crown Prince Tao take the throne to serve as the secondary emperor. He commissioned his key advisors Baba, Cui, Daxi Jin, An Tong (安同), Qiumuling Guan (丘穆陵觀), and Qiudun Dui (丘敦堆) to serve as the Crown Prince's advisor. From this point on, most matters, particularly domestic matters, were ruled on by Crown Prince Tao, while Emperor Mingyuan himself only ruled on important matters. It was at this time that Emperor Mingyuan made positive remarks about each of the officials that he so charged with advising the crown prince, and as to Cui Hao, he stated, "Cui Hao is exceptionally knowledgeable and able to discern the will of Heaven and men."

Later in 422, after Liu Yu's death, Emperor Mingyuan decided to launch a major attack on Liu Song. Cui Hao opposed this, believing that Liu Song could not be conquered. However, this was one instance that Cui only appeared to be partially correct, as the armies under Emperor Mingyuan were able to capture Liu Song's northern regions, directly south of the Yellow River, although Emperor Mingyuan's original lofty goal of destroying Liu Song was nowhere close to being met.

== During Emperor Taiwu's reign ==
In December 423, Emperor Mingyuan died, and Crown Prince Tao succeeded him as Emperor Taiwu. Immediately, many of the other officials, jealous of Cui Hao, made accusations against him. Not willing to go against the majority of officials, Emperor Taiwu relieved Cui of his posts and had him retire to his mansion as the Duke of Baima. However, because Emperor Taiwu also knew Cui to be intelligent and wise, he still often consulted Cui on important matters. During this time, Cui spent much time caring for his skin, and his skin was said to be so fair and beautiful that it was comparable to beautiful women's. He also compared his own intelligence to that of the famed Han dynasty strategist Zhang Liang, and further believed that his own knowledge surpassed that of Zhang.

It appeared to be around this time that Cui became a Taoist. Previously, Cui was said to dislike Daode Jing and Zhuangzi, the most important Taoist works, but he particularly despised Buddhism, believing it to be a religion of barbarians. After he met the Taoist monk Kou Qianzhi, who had reorganized the Taoist religious thoughts but received few adherents, he became a follower of Kou, and he made many petitions to Emperor Taiwu endorsing Kou's writings. Emperor Taiwu was impressed and became a Taoist and a follower of Kou as well, giving official approval to Kou's followers' proselytization of Taoism throughout his empire and approving a large amount of stipend for Kou's religious ceremonies.

Shandong, Hebei, Henan, Shaanxi, and Shanxi were where the Celestial Masters' northern branch operated, while Louguan and Guanzhong Daoism developed around Henan, Shanxi and Shaanxi. Celestial Masters are not believed to be connected with stele founded in Shaanxi.

An anti-Buddhist plan was concocted by the Celestial Masters under Kou Qianzhi along with Cui Hao under the Taiwu Emperor. The Celestial Masters of the north urged the persecution of Buddhists under the Taiwu Emperor in the Northern Wei, attacking Buddhism and the Buddha as wicked and as anti-stability and anti-family. Anti Buddhism was the position of Kou Qianzhi. There was no ban on the Celestial Masters despite the non-fullfilment of Cui Hao's and Kou Qianzhi's agenda in their anti-Buddhist campaign.

By 426, Cui Hao was again a minister in Emperor Taiwu's administration, and it was at this time that Emperor Taiwu was considering a target for his armies. Cui Hao was among the ministers who suggested that he attack Xia, believing that Xia's cruel laws made it the obvious target, and Emperor Taiwu agreed. It was also around this time that Emperor Taiwu considered making the minister Li Shun (李順), who was related to Cui by marriage, a major general. (Note: Cui's younger brother was married to Li's sister, and his nephew was married to Li's daughter.) Cui believed Li to be frivolous and unsuitable and persuaded Emperor Taiwu of that belief. From this point on, Cui and Li became political enemies.

In 427, after fighting dangerously but with Cui at his side, Emperor Taiwu captured the Xia capital Tongwan (in modern Yulin, Shaanxi), forcing the Xia emperor Helian Chang to flee to Shanggui (上邽, in modern Tianshui, Gansu) and allowing Northern Wei to take more than half of Xia territory.

In 429, Emperor Taiwu commissioned Cui to continue writing Northern Wei's history, a project that had started under Emperor Daowu with the official Deng Yuan (鄧淵) in charge. Cui engaged Deng Yuan's son Deng Ying (鄧穎) to assist him. This project, however, would eventually have dire consequences for both Cui and Deng.

Also in 429, at the advice of Cui, and against the advice of all other officials and his wet nurse Nurse Empress Dowager Dou, Emperor Taiwu attacked Rouran. (Note: Cui believed that further major conflicts with Liu Song were inevitable, and that Northern Wei must first deal Rouran a major defeat to avoid being attacked on both sides.) However, Cui did not accompany Emperor Taiwu on this campaign, although he did inform Kou, who was, that the main Rouran force must be found and destroyed. When Emperor Taiwu engaged Rouran and dealt it a major loss, but was unable to find its Mouhanheshenggai Khan, Yujiulü Datan, he did not want to advance any further in fear of a trap, and even when Kou informed him what Cui had said, he stopped the pursuit. Only later did he find out that he was actually close to Yujiulü Datan's position and could have easily found and destroyed Yujiulü Datan, and he regretted this greatly.

Around this time, for Cui Hao's contributions, Emperor Taiwu awarded him several high titles. Cui often observed the stars at night, and he soaked copper in vinegar. Whenever he would see something unusual, he would use the copper as a pen and write his findings on paper. Knowing this, Emperor Taiwu often visited Cui's house at night to consult him, and despite Cui's inability to serve him with gourmet food, Emperor Taiwu would often eat at least some of the food that Cui offered before returning to his palace. When new vassals, Gaoche chiefs, arrived in Pingcheng, he introduced Cui Hao to them, with this commentary:

When you see this man, he looks thin and weak, unable to bend bows and unable to bear spears. However, the power in his heart is greater than a million soldiers. Often, I have desire to conquer but not the resolution to do so, and I am able to accomplish what I have because of the teaching of this gentleman.

In 430, when it appeared that Emperor Wen of Song was about to attack, Northern Wei's southern defense forces suggested making a preemptory attack against Liu Song, but Cui Hao opposed it, pointing out that if the attack were not quickly successful, it risked causing Liu Song to counterattack across the Yellow River, endangering Northern Wei's existence. Rather, it was probably at Cui Hao's suggestion that, when Liu Song forces did attack later that year, Emperor Taiwu withdrew Northern Wei forces south of the Yellow River, judging that all Emperor Wen intended was to recapture the region south of the Yellow River, and that once the Yellow River froze in the winter Northern Wei could counterattack easily. It was definitely at Cui Hao's suggestion that despite the loss of territory to Liu Song at this time, Emperor Taiwu instead launched one final attack against Xia's emperor Helian Ding (Note: Helian Chang's brother and successor), seizing what remained of Xia territory and forcing Helian Ding to flee west, where he was captured by Tuyuhun's khan Murong Mugui (慕容慕璝) in 431. Meanwhile, even without Emperor Taiwu, Northern Wei forces were able to advance south in winter 430, quickly recapturing most of the territory that Liu Song had captured, and regaining all of it by spring 431.

In 431, for reasons not completely clear, Cui and Li Shun appeared to have had a reconciliation, as Cui recommended Li for a mission to Northern Liang, whose prince Juqu Mengxun had recently become a vassal. Upon Li's return, he reported Northern Liang's conditions in great detail, greatly encouraging Emperor Taiwu's plans to conquer Northern Liang. Believing Li to be capable, Emperor Taiwu also made him a major advisor, and Li and Cui appeared to resume their rivalry from this point on.

In late 431, against the advice of his nephew Lu Xuan (盧玄), Cui Hao began a plan to reexamine the ancestry of the officials, believing, as the prevailing thoughts were at the time, that the officials should be ranked in accordance with the honors that their clan had gained in the past. This brought much resentment against Cui. It was also at this time that, at Emperor Taiwu's orders, Cui Hao rewrote criminal laws to try to make the criminal justice system more lenient. However, only several features of the Cui criminal code are referred to in history:

- That five-year and four-year imprisonment terms were abolished, and one-year terms instituted.
- That those who used witchcraft to harm others would have a goat tied to his or her back and a dog tied to the chest and thrown into a river.
- That a sufficiently high-ranked official who committed a crime would be allowed to forgo his office in lieu of punishment.
- That if a pregnant women were sentenced to death, she would be allowed to bear her child and be executed 100 days after giving birth.
- That each governmental agency would have a drum next to its front door, so that those who believed that they had been unfairly punished could pound the drum and make their requests.

In 439, Emperor Taiwu, even though by this point he had taken Juqu Mengxun's daughter as a concubine and had married his sister Princess Wuwei to Juqu Mengxun's son and successor Juqu Mujian, became resolved to conquer Northern Liang, and Cui greatly encouraged him, despite opposition from other key officials, including Li Shun, Daxin Jin (達奚斤), and Tuxi Bi (吐奚弼). (Note: Why Li switched his position from supporting a campaign to opposing it at this point was unclear, but Cui would later accuse him of having accepted bribes from Juqu Mengxun and Juqu Mujian.) Li and Tuxi argued that Northern Liang's territory was desolate, and that the Northern Wei army would run out of food and water. Emperor Taiwu followed Cui's suggestion, and was able to quickly conquer Northern Liang and force Juqu Mujian's surrender—and when he saw that the region around Northern Liang's capital Guzang (姑臧, in modern Wuwei, Gansu) was exceptionally fertile, he became very resentful of Li, and would eventually force Li to commit suicide in 442. Meanwhile, after the conquest of Northern Liang, at Cui's request, Juqu Mujian's officials Yin Zhongda (陰仲達) and Duan Chenggen (段承根) were added to Cui's staff of historians. He also added Gao Yun to his staff around this time.

In 442, at Kou Qianzhi's urging, Emperor Taiwu ascended a platform and formally received Taoist amulets from Kou, and changed the color of his flags to blue, to show his Taoist beliefs and to officially approve Taoism as the state religion. From that point on, it became a tradition for Northern Wei emperors, when they took the throne, to receive Taoist amulets. Also at Kou and Cui Hao's urging, he started building Jinglun Palace (靜輪宮), intended to be so high that it would be quiet and close to the gods. (Note: Emperor Taiwu's crown prince Tuoba Huang, a Buddhist, opposed the construction project on the basis of cost, but Emperor Taiwu disagreed with him. This might be the first sign of growing tensions between Cui and the crown prince.)

In 444, similarly to how his father had transferred authority to him early, Emperor Taiwu transferred much of his authority to Crown Prince Huang. Also similarly to what his father had done, he made several of his key officials Crown Prince Huang's advisors, and Cui was among those officials. This did not appear to cause the relationship between Cui and the crown prince to warm, however.

Also in 444, Cui was involved in a major political event. Dugu Jie (獨孤絜), a high-level official, who had opposed attacking Rouran, was accused by Cui Hao of being so jealous of Cui, whose suggestions of attacking Rouran were accepted by Emperor Taiwu, that he sabotaged Emperor Taiwu's war efforts by giving the generals the wrong times for rendezvous, and then further planning to have Emperor Taiwu captured by Rouran and then making Emperor Taiwu's brother Tuoba Pi (拓跋丕) the Prince of Leping emperor. Emperor Taiwu put Dugu to death, and Tuoba Pi died from anxiety. Further, because Dugu implicated them while being interrogated, fellow officials Zhang Song (張嵩) and Kudi Lin (庫狄鄰) were also put to death.

In 446, the Lushuihu rebel Gai Wu (蓋吳) rose in the Guanzhong region, and when Emperor Taiwu personally attacked Gai, he found weapons in Buddhist temples and believed that Buddhists were conspiring against him. Cui, who despised Buddhism, fanned the flames, and Emperor Taiwu first slaughtered the Buddhist monks in Chang'an. Cui then, despite Kou Qianzhi's opposition, suggested to Emperor Taiwu to slaughter all monks in the empire. Emperor Taiwu proceeded to slaughter the monks in Chang'an, destroy the statues, and burn the sutras. He then issued an empire-wide prohibition of Buddhism. Crown Prince Huang, however, used delaying tactics in promulgating the edict, allowing Buddhists to flee or hide, but it was said that not a single Buddhist temple remained standing in Northern Wei. This was the first of the Three Disasters of Wu.

In 447, after receiving reports that Juqu Mujian was planning a rebellion, Emperor Taiwu sent Cui Hao to the residence that Juqu Mujian shared with Princess Wuwei, to force Juqu Mujian to commit suicide.

The Shi jing (Dietary Classic) was written by Cui Hao.

== Death ==
In 450, Cui Hao, despite his honored and trusted status, would be put to death along with the particular cadet branch of his clan which he belonged to. The complete reasons are not clear, but what happened slightly prior to 450 and in 450 gave strong indications. The official announcement was that Cui Hao had defamed the imperial clan.

It was said that Cui had, sometime prior to 450, become so entrenched in his position and the favors of the emperor that he had recommended a large number of talented men to be officials, starting at the fairly high rank of commandery governors. Crown Prince Huang opposed, believing that the current lower level officials should be first promoted, while the men Cui recommended be given those lower ranks and gradually promoted. However, Cui insisted, and the men were given commandery governorships. When he heard this, Gao Yun commented, "It will be difficult for Cui Hao to avoid disaster. How will he be able to afford to oppose those more powerful than he, just to satisfy his own desires?"

=== Official version ===
In 450, at the suggestion of his staff members Min Dan (閔湛) and Chi Biao (郗標), Cui carved the text of the histories that he was the lead editor of onto stone tablets, and erected the tablets next to the altars to Heaven outside of Pingcheng. The tablets were said to have revealed much about Emperor Taiwu's ancestors, and the Xianbei were very angry, accusing Cui of revealing the ancestors' faults and damaging the image of the state. Emperor Taiwu, in anger, arrested Cui.

Meanwhile, Crown Prince Huang, wanting to spare Gao, brought him into the palace, and asked Gao to blame all of the writing on Cui. Gao, instead, ascribed the authorship of the various parts of histories as such:

- The biography of Emperor Daowu was written by Deng Yuan.
- The biographies of Emperor Mingyuan and Emperor Taiwu were written jointly by Cui and Gao, but Gao said that he actually wrote about two thirds.

Emperor Taiwu was initially going to put Gao to death as well, but then was said to be impressed by Gao's admission and spared him, also at Crown Prince Huang's urging. He then summoned Cui, and Cui was said to be so fearful that he was not able to respond. Emperor Taiwu then ordered Gao to draft an edict for him, ordering that Cui and Cui's staff—128 men in total—be executed, along with five family branches each. Gao refused—stating that not even Cui should be executed. Emperor Taiwu, in anger, was going to put Gao to death as well, but Crown Prince Huang again pleaded for Gao, and Gao was again spared, and in fact, Emperor Taiwu reduced the number of people to be executed. However, Emperor Taiwu still ordered a great slaughter of people related to Cui:

- All men and women, regardless of age, named Cui and related to Cui Hao in Cui's home region of Qinghe Commandery (roughly modern Xingtai, Hebei)
- Several cadet branches of prominent clans with marital connections to Cui's clan, including:
  - The Lu (盧) clan of Fanyang Commandery
  - The Guo (郭) clan of Taiyuan Commandery
  - The Liu (柳) clan of Hedong Commandery

Cui's staff members themselves were executed, although not their families.

Before execution, Cui was put into a caged cart and placed outside Pingcheng so that people could see him. Scores of soldiers guarded him, and they took turns urinating on Cui's face and body. Cui yelled out in grief, and he sounded like "Ao Ao." After Cui's death, Emperor Taiwu began to regret putting him to death, and mourned bitterly.

Despite the massacre Cui Hao's immediate cadet branch, his larger clan Cui clan of Qinghe which had several cadet branches survived into the Tang dynasty as did the larger clans of the other families like the Lu clan of Fanyang which survived into the Song dynasty. The Guo clan of Taiyuan (太原郭氏) and the Liu clan of Hedong (河東柳氏) both survived into the Tang dynasty.

=== Unresolved issues ===
What is not clear is what Cui had revealed that would bring such disaster on him. After all, Gao had admitted to writing most of the history, and yet he was spared and Cui was severely punished. Further, what Cui had revealed was not recorded in history. That had led to speculation that perhaps Cui had tried to start a Han rebellion, or that he had been the victim of a Buddhist conspiracy. Neither speculation appeared to be more than speculation.

Modern historian Bo Yang believed there to be two probable reasons to Cui's death:

1. He believed that Cui did reveal an infamy about the imperial clan—that Emperor Daowu was a traitor and had sold out his father Tuoba Shiyiqian to Former Qin. (See here for more details; under the later official history, however, Tuoba Shiyiqian was Emperor Daowu's grandfather, not father.)
2. He believed that Cui was in conflict with Crown Prince Huang, and that it was at Crown Prince Huang's direction that Gao attributed the histories' authorship as indicated—because the key problematic passage would come from Tuoba Shiyiqian's biography, not Emperor Daowu's, and Gao was silent as to who wrote Tuoba Shiyiqian's biography.

Bo's analysis is itself speculation, but might be considered a reasonable explanation for what happened to Cui. Bo also believed that Cui was poisoned—which would explain why he was not able to respond at all to Emperor Taiwu's interrogation, and was later only yelling "Ao Ao" in lament, unable to say anything.
