= Ma Sui (Song dynasty) =

Ma Sui (馬遂) (died 1048) was a minor Song dynasty military officer who tried to kill the rebel leader Wang Ze with his bare hands, but failed and was dismembered. His heroics impressed Emperor Renzong of Song, who generously rewarded his family.

Ma Sui was prominently featured (as one of the "Three Sui") in the Ming dynasty novel The Three Sui Quash the Demons' Revolt, a fantasy novel loosely based on Wang Ze's rebellion.

== Biography ==
A native of Kaifeng, the Song dynasty capital, Ma Sui first joined the capital army and rose in ranks overs the years. When Wang Ze rebelled in Bei Prefecture in 1048, Ma Sui was stationed in the "northern capital" Daming Prefecture. Having heard the news, he went to see the Daming prefect Jia Changchao (賈昌朝) and asked to fight the rebels. Jia Changchao instead sent him to Bei Prefecture as an unarmed messenger with a letter demanding Wang Ze's surrender. Wang received Ma generously, but refused to answer any of Ma's questions. Suddenly Ma jumped, threw his cup at Wang, and with his fingers squeezed Wang's throat so hard it bled. Wang's followers then hacked off one of Ma's arms. Wang screamed, "You devil, I will chop you into ten thousand pieces!" Ma was promptly dismembered in front of the hall, but Wang reportedly rested for many days after the scare and injury.

Emperor Renzong of Song sighed for a long time after hearing Ma's story. He awarded Ma posthumously as "commissioner of palaces and gardens" (宮苑使). Ma's wife was honored as a madame, and his 5 sons received offices. The family also received generous material rewards. Wang's rebellion was suppressed quickly, and the soldier Shi Qing (石慶) who killed Ma was brought before Ma's sons, who sacrificed him.
