= Lady Cui (Cao Wei) =

Wife of Cao Zhi

Lady Cui 崔氏
- Spouse: Cao Zhi
- House: Cui clan of Qinghe
- Father: Cui Yan's elder brother

Lady Cui (崔氏) was a Chinese noblewoman of the Cui clan of Qinghe from the late Eastern Han dynasty. She was the wife of Cao Zhi, Cao Cao's son and a prince of the Cao Wei state during the Three Kingdoms period. She is best known for the incident that led to her death: after a dispute over succession between Cao Zhi and Cao Pi, Lady Cui wore an embroidered robe that was specific to the wife of the heir at a ceremony and was seen by Cao Cao who later forced her to commit suicide for violating the dress code.

== Biography ==
Lady Cui was born into the Cui clan of Qinghe in Qinghe Commandery. The Cui clan was an eminent Chinese family of high government officials and Confucian scholars. She was the niece of Cui Yan, a politician who served under Yuan Shao and later Cao Cao, a warlord who was a regent of Emperor Xian of Han. She married Cao Zhi, later a prince and famous poet, who was embroiled in a succession dispute over the leadership of Wei with his brother Cao Pi. Cao Cao once called Lady Cui's uncle to ask for an opinion on who should succeed him. Cao Cao considered making Cao Zhi heir and expected Cui Yan to support him on Lady Cui's behalf, but Cui Yan surprised him by saying that he should make Cao Pi his successor as he was the eldest surviving son.

In 216, in an incident widely regarded as a case of grievous injustice, Cui Yan was accused of defaming Cao Cao in a letter and ended up being stripped of his post, thrown into prison and subsequently forced to commit suicide.

During this time, Cao Cao became disappointed in Cao Zhi due to his bad behavior, such as the incident in the city of Ye where Cao Zhi walked drunk through the gate reserved only for the emperor. Around the same time, a close friend of Cao Zhi, Yang Xiu, was accused of insulting Cao Zhang. When Cao Cao learned of this, he had Yang Xiu executed in 219 after the campaign against Liu Bei at Hanzhong.

The Shishuo Xinyu records that once Cao Cao caught Lady Cui wearing clothes that were too extravagant and superior to her status, violating the law, and as punishment she was forced to commit suicide. According to this source, Lady Cui was dressed as the wife of the heir, which was seen as an affront as the succession discussion had ended in favor of Cao Pi, so she had to die to prevent any further opposition. The law Lady Cui violated was one of many designed to combat growing political corruption, as many people were dressing above their position to gain privileges.

At the same time, Lady Cui's death was a form of suppression of Cao Zhi, relatively weakening his power and support. It is unknown whether Lady Cui's death was shortly after her uncle's. Cao Zhi, who became known as one of the most influential poets, wrote several poems mourning her death. The reason for Yang Xiu's death, as well as Lady Cui's, is often answered by their proximity to Cao Zhi; although it is also justified by Yang Xiu knowing Cao Cao's inner thinking and cruelly ambitious nature.

In 220 Cao Cao died and a brief dispute ensued between Cao Pi, Cao Zhang (another son of Cao Cao and Queen Dowager Bian) and Cao Zhi; resulting in Cao Pi being crowned as Lady Cui's uncle recommended. Cao Zhi was banned from engaging in politics, and shortly afterwards Cao Zhang died, possibly poisoned by Cao Pi.

Cao Zhi had two sons — Cao Miao and Cao Zhi (Yungong) and two daughters — Cao Jinhu and Cao Xingnü. It is not known whether Cao Zhi's three children were born to Lady Cui or not. According to his biography in Book of Jin, Cao Zhi's mother was a concubine.

== Appraisal ==
The condemnations of Cui clan members are considered to be unjust. Yi Zhongtian a contemporary historian said ''Cui Yan used his death to prove he was a gentleman. Cao Cao used Cui Yan's death to prove he was a traitor''.

== Bibliography ==
- Pei, Songzhi (5th century). Annotated Records of the Three Kingdoms (Sanguozhi zhu).
- Chen, Shou (3rd century). Records of the Three Kingdoms (Sanguozhi).
