= Wang Ze =

Chinese rebel

Wang Ze 王則
- Reign: December 18, 1047 – February 17, 1048
- Born: Unknown; Zhuo Prefecture, Liao Empire
- Died: March 14, 1048; Kaifeng Prefecture, Song Empire
Era name and dates
- Déshèng (得聖): December 20, 1047 – February 17, 1048
Regnal name
- King of Dongping (東平郡王)
- Dynasty: Anyang (安陽)

Wang Ze
- Traditional Chinese: 王則
- Simplified Chinese: 王则
Transcriptions
Standard Mandarin
- Hanyu Pinyin: Wáng Zé

Wang Ze (died 14 March 1048) was a rebel leader during Emperor Renzong's reign in the Song dynasty, whose agrarian army occupied Bei Prefecture for 65 days before it was crushed by the government army led by Wen Yanbo.

Wang utilized Maitreya teachings as a tool to organize his Millenarian troops. A much later supernatural novel The Three Sui Quash the Demons' Revolt based its story on this rebellion.

== Early life ==
Wang Ze was a Zhuo Prefecture native who during a famine drifted to Bei Prefecture, where he sold himself to become a goatherd. Later he became a corporal in the army. Back when he left Zhuo Prefecture, his mother had tattooed the Chinese character fu (福; "auspiciousness") on his back as a talisman. Believers in the Maitreyan cult, present in great numbers in Bei Prefecture and the neighboring Ji Prefecture, spread the false rumor about his tattoo, and soon enough Wang became the cult leader. Their doctrine proclaimed, "Sakyamuni has declined and Maitreya shall rule the world."

With the assistance of subprefectural clerks Zhang Luan and Bu Ji, Wang's following spread to neighboring De Prefecture and Qi Prefecture. The original plan was to destroy the pontoon bridge in Chan Prefecture on 10 January 1048, but after the capture of cult activist Pan Fangjing (潘方凈)—for attempting and failing to assassinate the prefect of Daming—Wang and his followers decided to rise in arms quickly.

== The rebellion ==
Once Wang Ze and his followers raided the armory, Bei's prefect Zhang Deyi (張得一) fled to the cavalry barracks, but he was captured after the rebels burned down the doors. After some fighting on the streets, Wang's followers successfully drove away general Tian Bin (田斌) and his cavalry from the city, then proceeded to massacre most officials that could not get away. They also released all prisoners from jail.

Ma Sui was sent by Daming prefect Jia Changchao (賈昌朝) as an unarmed messenger with a letter demanding Wang Ze's surrender. During negotiations, Ma jumped and threw his cup at Wang, and attempted to strangle Wang to death with bare hands. Wang's followers then hacked off one of Ma's arms, stopping the strangulation and Ma was subsequently killed. Wang reportedly rested for many days after the scare and injury.

Once order was restored, Wang proclaimed himself the King of Dongping (東平郡王), founder of a new state called Anyang (安陽). His era name was to be "Desheng" (得聖; "Acquiring God"), and a new calendar was drawn up changing the twelfth lunar month to the first month (as the rebellion happened in the twelfth lunar month). He also named Zhang Luan the chancellor and Bu Ji the commissioner of military affairs.

== Notes and references ==
- (in Chinese) Toqto'a; et al., eds. (1345). Song Shi (宋史) [History of Song].
- (in Chinese) Li Tao (1183). Xu Zizhi Tongjian Changbian (續資治通鑑長編) [Extended Continuation to Zizhi Tongjian].
- Fusek, Lois. "A Fantastic History: San Sui ping yao zhuan Reconsidered". The Three Sui Quash the Demons' Revolt: A Comic Novel Attributed to Luo Guanzhong. University of Hawai'i Press.
