= Cao Zhi =

Cao Wei prince and poet (192–232)

Cao Zhi 曹植
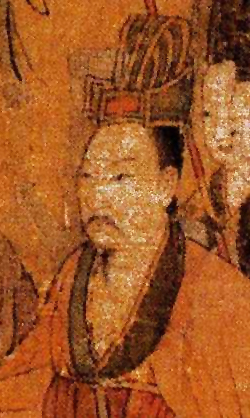
- Detail from Nymph of Luo River

Prince of Chen (陳王)
- Tenure: c. March 232 – 27 December 232
- Successor: Cao Zhi (Yungong)

Prince of Dong'e (東阿王)
- Tenure: 229–232

Prince of Yongqiu (雍丘王)
- Tenure: 228–229; 223–227

Prince of Junyi (浚儀王)
- Tenure: 227–228

Prince of Juancheng (鄄城王)
- Tenure: 12 May 222 – 223

Marquis of Juancheng (鄄城侯)
- Tenure: 221 – 12 May 222
- Born: 192 (Note: Cao Rui's biography in the Sanguozhi recorded that Cao Zhi died on the gengyin day of the 11th month of the 6th year of the Taihe era of Cao Rui's reign. This date corresponds to 27 December 232 in the Julian calendar. Cao Zhi's biography in the Sanguozhi also recorded that he was 41 (by East Asian age reckoning) when he died. By calculation, Cao Zhi was born in 192.); Juancheng County, Shandong
- Died: 27 December 232 (aged 40); Huaiyang District, Henan
- Spouse: Lady Cui
- Issue: Cao Miao; Cao Zhi (Yungong); Cao Jinhu; Cao Xingnü
Names
- Family name: Cao (曹); Given name: Zhi (植); Courtesy name: Zijian (子建)
Posthumous name
- Prince Si (思王)
- House: House of Cao
- Father: Cao Cao
- Mother: Empress Wuxuan

Cao Zhi
- "Cao Zhi" in Chinese characters
- Chinese: 曹植
Transcriptions
Standard Mandarin
- Hanyu Pinyin: Cáo Zhí
- Gwoyeu Romatzyh: Tsaur Jyr
- Wade–Giles: Ts'ao^{2} Chih^{2}
- IPA: [tsʰǎʊ ʈʂɨ̌]
Yue: Cantonese
- Yale Romanization: Chòuh Jihk
- Jyutping: Cou^{4} Zik^{6}
- IPA: [tsʰɔw˩ tsɪk̚˨]
Southern Min
- Tâi-lô: Tsô Si̍t
Middle Chinese
- Middle Chinese: dzaw d͡ʒik

Cao Zhi (Chinese: 曹植; 192 – 27 December 232), courtesy name Zijian (Chinese: 子建), posthumously known as Prince Si of Chen (陈思王), was a prince of the state of Cao Wei in the Three Kingdoms period of China, and an accomplished poet in his time. His style of poetry, greatly revered during the Jin dynasty and Southern and Northern Dynasties, came to be known as the Jian'an style.

Cao Zhi was a son of Cao Cao, a warlord who rose to power towards the end of the Eastern Han dynasty and laid the foundation for the state of Cao Wei. As Cao Zhi once engaged his elder brother Cao Pi in a power struggle to succeed their father, he was ostracised by his victorious brother after the latter became the emperor and established the Cao Wei state. In his later life, Cao Zhi was not allowed to meddle in politics, despite his many petitions to seek office.

== Early life ==
Born in 192, Cao Zhi was the third son of the warlord Cao Cao and Lady Bian. According to the Records of the Three Kingdoms (Sanguozhi), Cao Zhi could recite the Shi Jing, Analects and more than ten thousand verses worth of poems before he even turned 20. His literary talent made him a favorite son of Cao Cao in the early stage of his life. He married Lady Cui of the Cui clan of Qinghe, a niece of Cui Yan.

== Character and failure ==
However, Cao Zhi was an impetuous man with little self-discipline. He was also a heavy drinker. On the other hand, his elder brother Cao Pi knew how to act at the right times. Cao Pi also enjoyed a much closer relationship to the servants and subjects around Cao Cao, and they spoke well of him. In 217, Cao Cao eventually picked Cao Pi to succeed himself. This further aggravated Cao Zhi's already eccentric behaviour. He once rode his chariot along the road reserved for the emperor and through the Sima Gate (司马门), the front gate of the palace. This infuriated his father, who had the chariot driver executed.

Cao Zhi's wife, Lady Cui, was caught by Cao Cao wearing clothes that were too extravagant and superior to her status, violating the law. As punishment she was forced to commit suicide. She was dressed as Crown Princess (consort of the Crown Prince), which was seen as an affront as the succession discussion had ended in favor of Cao Pi as Crown Prince, so she was killed to prevent any further opposition.

Having chosen a successor, Cao Cao took measures to undermine other contestants. He did this by executing Yang Xiu, a chief adviser to Cao Zhi. This greatly unsettled Cao Zhi, but failed to jolt him back to his senses. On the contrary, he sank further into his drunken habits. In 219, Cao Cao's cousin and leading general Cao Ren was besieged at the fortress at Fancheng (樊城; present-day Fancheng District, Hubei) by Guan Yu. Cao Cao named Cao Zhi to lead a relief force to the rescue, in the hope that the task would instil into the latter a sense of responsibility. However, Cao Zhi was so drunk that he could not come forth to take the order. Cao Cao then gave up on this son.

Within months, Cao Cao died. One of the first things Cao Pi did was to do away with Ding Yi (丁儀) and Ding Yì (丁廙), two firm supporters of Cao Zhi. He also sent Cao Zhi, along with the other brothers, away from the capital to a country estate exiling them into the countryside, and prohibited them from taking part in central political issues.

== Continued rejection ==
Prospects for Cao Zhi did not improve after Cao Pi died in June 226. He wrote to the second Wei emperor, his nephew Cao Rui, many times, seeking a position to apply his talents. In 232, he even sought a private meeting with Cao Rui to discuss politics. However, Cao Rui probably still considered him a threat to the throne (Note: As Cao Zhi was by then the only surviving son of Cao Cao and Empress Dowager Bian (who was alive for the first few years of Cao Rui's reign), his legitimacy could be seen as being superior even when compared to his nephew-emperor.) and declined all the offers.

== Death ==
Severely depressed by the setbacks and by the news that he was to leave the capital for the third time in eleven years, Cao Zhi soon developed a fatal illness. Aged 41 (by East Asian reckoning), he quickly died in December 232, leaving behind instructions for a simple burial. He was succeeded as Prince of Chen by his son Cao Zhi; Cao Zhi's fiefdom was soon shifted to Jibei (济北).

His tomb in Yushan (魚山) of Dong'e county was excavated in 1951, during which 28 bones were recovered. However, the whereabouts of these bones are currently unknown.

== Poetry ==
Despite his failure in politics, Cao Zhi was hailed as one of the representatives of the poetic style of his time, together with his father Cao Cao, his elder brother Cao Pi and several other poets. Their poems formed the backbone of what was to be known as the Jian'an poetry style (建安風骨). The civil strife towards the end of the Eastern Han dynasty gave the Jian'an poems their characteristic solemn yet heart-stirring tone, while lament over the ephemerality of life was also a central theme of works from this period. In terms of the history of Chinese literature, the Jian'an poems were a transition from the early folk songs into scholarly poetry.

Although Jian'an refers to the era name between 196 and 220, Cao Zhi's poems could in fact be categorised into two periods, with the year 220 as the watershed. The earlier period consisted of poems that expressed his ambitions. These poems were optimistic and romantic in nature. On the other hand, his setbacks in political pursuits after the death of his father in 220 gave rise to the grievous tone of his later works.

More than 90 poems by Cao Zhi remain today, more than 60 of which are five-character poems (五言詩). These are held in high esteem for their significant influence over the development of five-character poetry in later ages. The most complete collection of Cao Zhi's poems and other literary works is Chen Si Wang Ji (陳思王集, Collection of Works by King Si of Chen), compiled during the Ming dynasty. One of Cao Zhi's most celebrated poems is On the White Horse. Written in the early years of his life, the poem portrayed a young warrior who answered fearlessly to the need of his country and reflected Cao Zhi's own aspiration to contribute to his times.

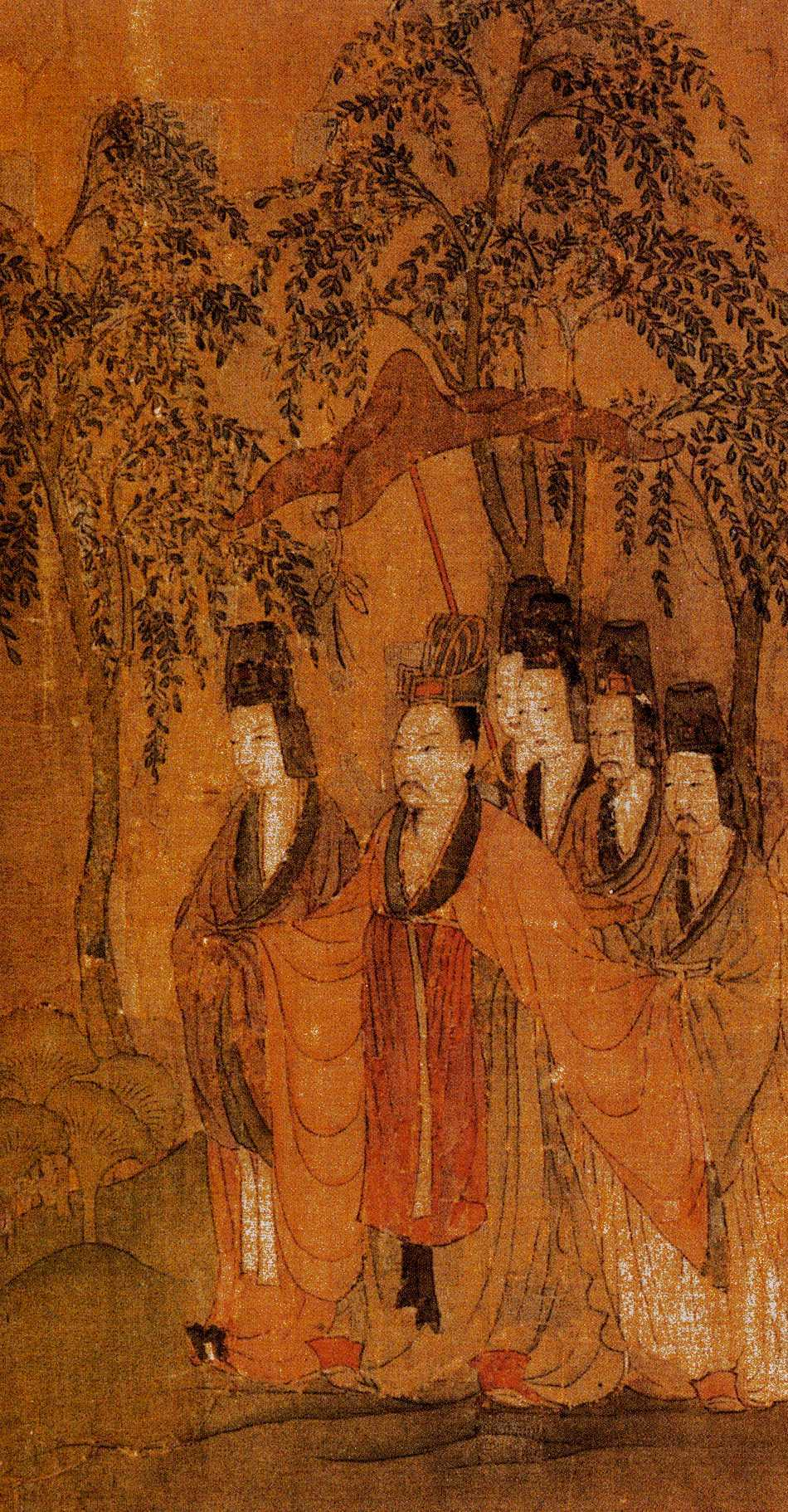
Cao Zhi's full-length portrait on Nymph of Luo River (or Goddess of Luo River) by Gu Kaizhi of the Jin dynasty (266–420), which illustrates a fu (descriptive poem) of same title written by Cao Zhi.

《白馬篇》

白馬飾金羈，
連翩西北馳。
借問誰家子，
幽幷遊俠兒。
少小去鄉邑，
揚聲沙漠垂。
宿昔秉良弓，
楛矢何参差。
控弦破左的，
右發摧月支。
仰手接飛猱，
俯身散馬蹄。
狡捷過猴猿，
勇剽若豹螭。
邊城多警急，
胡虏數遷移。
羽檄从北來，
厲馬登高堤。
長驅蹈匈奴，
左顧陵鲜卑。
弃身鋒刃端，
性命安可懷。
父母且不顧，
何言子与妻。
名編壯士籍，
不得中顧私。
捐軀赴國難，
視死忽如歸。

Translation:
On the White Horse

A white horse, in a halter of gold,
Galloping swiftly to the northwest.
Ask which family's son is the rider –
A noble knight, who hails from You and Bing.
He left his home in early youth, and now,
His name is known throughout the deserts.
Morning and evening he clutches his bow;
How many arrows hang at his side!
He pulls his bow — the left-hand target is pierced,
He shoots at the right and cuts it through.
Upwards his arrows seek the flying monkeys,
Downward they destroy another object.
His dexterity surpasses that of monkeys,
His courage that of a leopard or dragon.
Alarms are heard from the frontier!
Northern tribesmen pour into the country in their thousands.
Letters are sent from the north, and
Reining his horse he clambers up the hill.
He charges Hun soldiers to the right;
Looking left he assaults the Xianbei.
He has staked himself on the edge of his sword;
How can he treasure his life?
Even his father and mother he puts at the back of his mind,
Let alone his children and wife.
If his name is to enter the roll of the heroes,
He cannot be concerned about personal matters.
Giving up his life for the sake of his country,
He looks toward death as a journey home...

— Translation by Wu Fusheng and Gradham Hartill

Cao Zhi's most famous poem was the Seven Steps Verse, often translated as The Quatrain of Seven Steps. However, his authorship of this poem is disputed since the poem comes from the Shishuo Xinyu, a collection of ahistorical anecdotes.

== In Romance of the Three Kingdoms ==
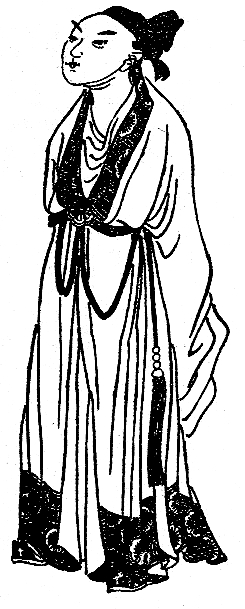
Portrait of Cao Zhi from a Qing dynasty edition of the historical novel Romance of the Three Kingdoms

Romance of the Three Kingdoms, a 14th-century historical novel, was a romanticisation of the events that occurred during the late Eastern Han dynasty and Three Kingdoms period. Exploiting the complicated relationship among the Cao Cao's sons, especially Cao Pi and Cao Zhi, Luo Guanzhong was able to create a scenario where the elder brother, having succeeded his father, tried to do away with his younger brother.

After the death of Cao Cao, Cao Zhi failed to turn up for the funeral. Men sent by Cao Pi found Cao Zhi drunk in his own house. Cao Zhi was then bound and brought to Cao Pi. When Empress Bian, their common birth mother, heard of this, she went to Cao Pi and pleaded for the life of her younger son. Cao Pi agreed. However, Hua Xin then convinced Cao Pi to put Cao Zhi's literary talent to a test. If Cao Zhi failed the test, it would be excuse enough to put him to death, Hua Xin suggested.

Cao Pi agreed and held audience with Cao Zhi, who in great trepidation bowed low and confessed his faults. On the wall there was a painting of two oxen fighting, one of which was falling into a well. Cao Pi told his brother to make a poem based on the painting after walking seven paces. However, the poem was not to contain explicit reference to the subjects of the drawing.

Cao Zhi took seven paces as instructed, and the poem was already formulated in his heart. He then recited:

兩肉齊道行，
頭上帶凸骨。
相遇塊山下，
欻起相搪突。
二敵不俱剛，
一肉臥土窟。
非是力不如，
盛氣不泄畢。

Translation:

Two butcher's victims lowing walked along,
Each head bore curving bones, a sturdy pair.
They met just by a hillock, both were strong,
Each would avoid a pit newly-dug there.
They fought unequal battle, for at length
One lay below a gory mess, inert.
'Twas not that they were of unequal strength
Though wrathful both, one did not strength exert.

— C. H. Brewitt-Taylor

However, Cao Pi was not satisfied. He then bade Cao Zhi make another poem on the spot based on their fraternal relationship, without using the word "brother". Not taking a second to think, Cao Zhi recited the famous Seven Steps Verse: 煮豆燃豆萁，豆在釜中泣。本是同根生，相煎何太急? (Note: see translations and different renditions in Seven Steps Verse) Having heard this, Cao Pi was moved to tears. He then let his brother go after merely degrading the peerage of the latter as a punishment.

== Modern references ==
In 2002, Hong Kong's TVB produced the television drama, Where the Legend Begins, featuring Cao Zhi as the intelligent and compassionate protagonist. Steven Ma played the role of Cao Zhi in the series. There is also a 2013 Chinese television series Legend of Goddess Luo produced by Huace Film and TV, starring Yang Yang as Cao Zhi.

Cao Zhi (Ts'ao Chih) may be the titular figure of Ezra Pound's poem Ts'ai Chi'h, included in Des Imagistes (1914).

== See also ==
- Han poetry
- Jian'an poetry
- Lists of people of the Three Kingdoms
- List of Chinese language poets
- The Quatrain of Seven Steps
