= Cui Hong =

- 崔宏

Minister of Civil Service Affairs (吏部尚書)
- In office ?–?
- Monarch: Emperor Daowu of Northern Wei

Personal details
- Born: Unknown Linqing, Shandong
- Died: 418
- Spouse: Lady Lu
- Children: Cui Hao; Cui Jian; Cui Tian
- Parent: Cui Qian
- Courtesy name: Xuanbo (玄伯)
- Peerage: Duke of Baima (白馬公)
- Posthumous name: Wenzhen (文貞)

Cui Hong (died 418), courtesy name Xuanbo, was a Chinese minister of the Northern Wei during the Northern and Southern dynasties period. Serving the Former Qin and Later Yan in his early career, he was eventually employed by Tuoba Gui (posthumously known as Emperor Daowu) and became an important minister within the Northern Wei administration. Cui was a favourite of Tuoba Gui and his successor, Emperor Mingyuan, and was credited with establishing many of the official systems, laws and rites of the early Wei government. His son, Cui Hao was also an influential minister who later aided Emperor Taiwu in his reunification of northern China.

== Early life and career ==
Cui Hong was a member of the famous Cui clan of Qinghe as the grandson of Cui Yue, a minister and calligrapher under the Later Zhao, and the son of Cui Qian, an official of Former Yan. From a young age, he was described as exceptionally talent, earning the nickname of the "Child Prodigy of Ji Province" (冀州神童). In 372, under the reign of Fu Jian of the Former Qin dynasty, the Duke of Yangping, Fu Rong assigned to Governor of Ji province, during which he recruited Cui Hong as a Palace Attendant, Assistant Officer and Recordkeeper. Cui was decisive in handling general affairs in the province while also developing a close friendship with Fu Rong. His achievements soon gained the attention of Fu Jian, who summoned him to serve in the imperial court, but Cui declined due to his mother's illness and was demoted to an Assistant Editorial Director.

In 380, Fu Jian's son, Fu Pi, replaced Fu Rong as Governor and appointed Cui Hong as Officer of Merit of the Eastern Expeditionary Forces. Following the disastrous Battle of Fei River in 383, the Former Qin fell into a rapid collapse. Cui Hong fled to the Qi-Lu region for refuge and planned to head further south to join the Eastern Jin dynasty, but along the way, he was detained by the Heavenly King of Zhai Wei, Zhai Zhao. In 392, Zhai Wei was destroyed by the Later Yan, and Cui Hong subsequently served under them. He successively held the offices of Secretarial Court Gentleman, Assistant of the Left of the Masters of Writing and Interior Minister of Gaoyang.

== Service under Emperor Daowu ==
In 396, Tuoba Gui (posthumously known as Emperor Daowu) of the Northern Wei invaded Later Yan and conquered Changshan. Cui Hong abandoned his post at Gaoyang and fled east, but Tuoba, hearing of Cui's reputation, sent a cavalry detachment to capture Cui and bring him to his army camp. Tuoba was impressed by Cui from their conversation and promptly appointed him as a Gentleman at the Yellow Gates, tasking him with managing confidential affairs alongside Zhang Gun while establishing state institutions.

Later on, Cui Hong was transferred to Minister of Civil Service Affairs, during which he held executive power over matters pertaining to official ranks, court etiquette, music and laws. Many of his decisions became established rules in the Northern Wei. When the Eight Councillors were established, Cui Hong was placed in charge of the 36 bureau departments below them. Cui's power in the Wei court was unparalleled among his peers, and Tuoba Gui trusted him as his chief consultant and often followed his advice. One particular advice he followed was to forbid his court officials from marrying his princesses, instead marrying these princesses off to his vassal states. Cui was later dismissed from his post as Supervisor but was granted the fiefly title of Marquis of Baima. He was then appointed General of the Zhou Army, holding an equal position to that of Yu Yue and Xi Jin, but with more personal favour from Tuoba Gui. Even as Tuoba Gui reportedly went mad and began a brutal purge of his government during the later years of his life, Cui Hong and his son, Cui Hao continued to receive the emperor's goodwill.

== Service under Emperor Mingyuan ==
In 409, Emperor Daowu was assassinated by his son, the Prince of Qinghe, Tuoba Shao. At the time, the court knew that Daowu had died, but not the circumstances surrounding his death. As confusion and sedition arose, Tuoba Shao gifted the princes and ministers with clothes to appease them, but only Cui Hong did not accept them. Soon, Daowu's heir, the Prince of Qi, Tuoba Si, entered Pingcheng and killed Tuoba Shao before ascending the throne. Tuoba Si, posthumously known as Emperor Mingyuan, appointed Cui Hong, along with Zhangsun Song, Xi Jin, An Tong and four others, to sit on the right side of the Zhichen Gate (止車門) to discuss court affairs with him. These people were later known as the "Eight Sages" (八公). For refusing Tuoba Shao's gift, Emperor Mingyuan also specially commended Cui Hong and gifted him 200 bolts of cloth before the other officials.

Later, Emperor Mingyuan assigned Cui Hong and Mu Guan to investigate officials accused of illegal activities and oversee their trials. Cui was praised by the emperor for his fair and appropriate handling of these trials, and in 411, he was once again appointed to adjudicate on criminal cases with Zhangsun Song in court.

On one occasion, Emperor Mingyuan, believing that the local gentry in several counties and commanderies were a burden to the common people, sent out an edict summoning them to Pingcheng, ostensibly to reward them, but the real intention was to force them out of their hometowns. However, many of these people saw through his ruse and refused to leave, and as the local officials began to pressure them, they intensified their resistance by forming gangs and stirring up trouble. With the situation beginning to spiral out of control, Emperor Mingyuan decided to issue a general amnesty. The minister, Tuoba Qu, opposed this decision, believing they should be executing the ringmasters while sparing their followers. On the other hand, Cui Hong supported a general amnesty for the well-being of the people, and that they should only execute those who continued to resist. In the end, Emperor Mingyuan went with Cui Hong's advice.

In 415, a famine broke out in Shangdang Commandery, which caused the Hu people of Bing province to rise up in revolt. Emperor Mingyuan initially dispatched Gongsun Biao to suppress them, but Gongsun suffered a defeat. Fearing that the rebellion will have adversely impact the harvest season, the emperor consulted several of his ministers for advice. Cui Hong opined that Gongsun's defeat was simply due to his miscalculations, not due to a lack of strength. He further stated that the rebels lacked a real leader, and that they should have Shusun Jian participate in the campaign due to his fearsome reputation among the people in Bing. Following his advice, the Wei forces under Shusun crushed the revolt the following year. Afterwards, Cui Hong was appointed Daren of the Heavenly Division and had his peerage elevated to the Duke of Baima.

In 418, Cui Hong fell deathly ill, so Emperor Mingyuan sent Mu Guan to receive his last words as well as courtiers to monitor and report on his condition. Not long after, Cui died. Mingyuan issued an edict to express his grief, posthumously appointing Cui as Minister of Works and giving him the posthumous name of "Wenzhen". During the reign of Emperor Xiaowen (471–499), his name was enshrined in the Imperial Ancestral Temple.
