= Cui clan of Qinghe =

Chinese aristocratic family

The Cui clan of Qinghe (Chinese: 清河崔氏) was an eminent Chinese family of high-ranking government officials and Confucian scholars. The clan's ancestral home was in Qinghe Commandery, which covered parts of present-day Shandong and Hebei provinces.

The Cui clans of Boling and Qinghe both traced their ancestry to a common ancestor, Cui Ming, an official who lived in the Spring and Autumn period.

The first notable member of this clan, according to the New Book of Tang, was Cui Ye (崔業), who held the peerage of Marquis of Donglai (東萊候) during the Han dynasty.

Cui Lin, a high-ranking official of the Cao Wei state during the Three Kingdoms period, was from the Cui family of Qinghe, as was his relative Cui Yan, a notable official who served in the administration of the Grand Chancellor Cao Cao in the late Eastern Han dynasty. Cui Yan's niece, Lady Cui, married Cao Zhi, a famous poet and prince of the Cao Wei state. Another member of the clan married Liu Kun, a general and poet of the Jin dynasty.

The Liu clan of Zhongshan, the Lu clan of Fanyang and the Cui clan of Qinghe formed a network.

The Cui clan of Qinghe expanded its power over many official positions in the Northern Wei dynasty through political marriages, and became one of the four main clans of Northern China at the time. Cui Hao's family, a cadet branch of the Cui clan of Qinghe, was exterminated during the Northern Wei, but other branches of the clan survived.

During the Sui and Tang dynasties, the Cui clan of Qinghe was able to maintain its prosperity by producing a total of 12 statesmen from various branches who served as grand chancellors in the imperial government. Among them was Cui Qun. Lady Cui, a member of the Zhengzhou branch of the clan, married Dugu Xin and became the mother of Empress Wenxian. Around the time of the Sui dynasty, Lady Cui, a daughter of Cui Biao, married a son of Yang Su.

During the Tang dynasty, the Li clan of Zhao Commandery (趙郡李氏), the Cui clan of Boling, the Cui clan of Qinghe, the Lu clan of Fanyang, the Zheng clan of Xingyang (滎陽鄭氏), the Wang clan of Taiyuan (太原王氏) and the Li clan of Longxi (隴西李氏) were seven families who were legally banned from intermarriages. It is known that the Cui clan of Qinghe intermarried with the Ming clan of Ge County.

The Cui clan of Qinghe lost their political privilege by the end of the Tang dynasty and dissolved into different social classes.

== Branches ==
These were the branches of the Cui clan of Qinghe and some of their cadet branches:

- Eastern ancestry (東祖)
- Western ancestry (西祖)
- Southern ancestry (南祖)
  - Wushui branch (烏水房)
- Senior branch of Qinghe (清河大房)
- Junior branch of Qinghe (清河小房)
- Qingzhou branch of Qinghe (清河青州房)
- Zhengzhou branch of Qinghe (清河鄭州房)
- Xuzhou branch of Qinghe (清河許州房)
  - Yanling branch (鄢陵房)

== Prominent members ==
- Cui Yan (崔琰; 163–216), official who served under Yuan Shao and Cao Cao
- Cui Lin (崔林; d. 245), Cao Wei official who became one of the Three Excellencies
- Cui Bi, great-grandson of Cui Yan
- Cui Hao, a seventh-generation descendant of Cui Lin. (Note: His father Cui Hong was a sixth-generation descendant of Cui Lin.)
