= Cui Lin =

Chinese Cao Wei official (died 245)

- 崔林

Minister of Works (司空)
- In office 18 November 238 – January or February 245
- Monarch: Cao Rui / Cao Fang
- Preceded by: Wei Zhen
- Succeeded by: Zhao Yan

Colonel-Director of Retainers (司隸校尉)
- In office 227 – 18 November 238
- Monarch: Cao Rui

Minister of the Household (光祿勛)
- In office 227–238
- Monarch: Cao Pi

Minister Herald (大鴻臚)
- In office ?–226
- Monarch: Cao Pi

Administrator of Hejian (河間太守)
- In office ?–?
- Monarch: Cao Pi

Inspector of You Province (幽州刺史)
- In office 220–?
- Monarch: Cao Pi

Master of Writing (尚書)
- In office 220–?
- Monarch: Cao Pi

Palace Assistant Imperial Clerk (御史中丞)
- In office 213–220
- Monarch: Emperor Xian of Han
- Chancellor: Cao Cao

Personal details
- Born: Unknown Zhucheng, Shandong
- Died: January or February 245 (Note: Cao Fang's biography in the Sanguozhi recorded that Cui Lin died in the 12th month of the 5th year of the Zhengshi era of Cao Fang's reign. This month corresponds to 15 January to 13 February 245 in the Gregorian calendar.)
- Relations: see Cui clan of Qinghe
- Children: Cui Shu; Cui Sui
- Occupation: Politician
- Courtesy name: Deru (德儒)
- Posthumous name: Marquis Xiao (孝侯)
- Peerage: Marquis of Anyang District (安陽鄉侯)

Cui Lin (died January or February 245), courtesy name Deru, was a Chinese politician of the state of Cao Wei during the Three Kingdoms period of China. He was known for his scruples in good governance, judgment of character, and for being the first of the Three Ducal Ministers after the end of the Eastern Han dynasty to be enfeoffed as a marquis. He was from Dongwu County, Qinghe Commandery, Ji Province, which is in present-day Zhucheng, Shandong.

== Service under Cao Cao ==
Although Cui Lin was a member of the influential Cui family of Qinghe Commandery, his extended family was not well-acquainted with him, and only his relative Cui Yan thought him exceptional. In 200, following Cao Cao's conquest of Ji Province, Cui Lin was summoned to be Chief of Wu County (鄔縣), in present-day Shanxi. He drew such a pitiful salary from this position that he could not even afford a horse and carriage.

Zhang Zhi (張陟), the inspector of Bing Province, recommended Cui Lin to Cao Cao as the village chief whose governance was the most virtuous. As a result, Cui Lin was promoted to higher offices in the central administration of Ji Province, and shortly thereafter transferred to Cao Cao's office.

In 213, Cao Cao was enfeoffed as the Duke of Wei (魏公), and Cui Lin was promoted to Palace Assistant Imperial Clerk (御史中丞), a powerful position overseeing correspondence from the provincial inspectors and their subordinates. When Cao Pi established the state of Cao Wei in 220, Cui Lin was sent out to be the Inspector of You Province on the northeastern frontier. He held this office for one season, then took the office of Administrator of Hejian Commandery (河閒郡). (Note: Hejian Commandery had, in different points in its history, been classified as a commandery or a state; during the early Cao Wei dynasty it was a commandery, encompassing an area somewhat greater than present-day Hejian City in Cangzhou, Hebei.) The base text of the Records of the Three Kingdoms says that Cui Lin voluntarily gave up control of You Province to make way for Wu Zhi to unite the northern frontier forces, which Cui Lin considered a better way of dealing with the non-Han Chinese frontier peoples. However, Pei Songzhi notes a memorial by Xin Pi stating that Huan Jie, at that time holding the post of Supervisor of the Masters of Writing, felt Cui Lin was incapable as a provincial inspector and demoted him.

== As Minister Herald ==
From the Administrator of Hejian Commandery, Cui Lin rose to the position of Minister Herald, in charge of interstate affairs with foreign dependencies. In 222, while Cui Lin occupied this post, the King of Kucha sent a son to study under and be sinicised by the Wei court, which richly rewarded the king for sending his son such a long way. Sensing opportunity, the other border states each sent a prince to study at the Wei court. Cui Lin feared some of the envoys sent to collect their princes' ransoms were unreliable, so he stamped and sealed their rewards and attached to their return missions groups of mercantile border people who guarded the treasure the entire road back.

At Dunhuang, Cui Lin had the imperial decrees promulgated, and engraved important stories from Chinese history to ensure their endurance. In 226, Cao Rui granted Cui Lin the landless title of a Secondary Marquis, and promoted him to Minister of the Household (光祿勳) and Colonel-Director of Retainers, one of the Three Venerables (三獨坐).

== Late career ==
As Colonel-Director of Retainers, Cui Lin wielded supervisory power over officials in and around the capital region. In the areas he controlled, he fired all government officials who had engaged in illegal conduct or committed transgressions. He enforced honesty in governance, streamlined process, and protected the body politic, earning him lasting acclaim. A future Colonel-Director of Retainers under Cao Fang, Wang Jing, was a farmer from the same commandery as Cui Lin, whom Cui Lin plucked from obscurity out of an infantry squad.

In 238, following a strong recommendation from the imperial adviser Meng Kang (孟康), Cui Lin was promoted to Minister of Works, one of the Three Ducal Ministers, the highest positions in the civil government. He was enfeoffed as the Marquis of Anyang Village, with a marquisate of 600 taxable households. After spending his entire stipend, he was promoted to a district marquis, although his fief was later split and part given to a son of Cao Rui. Cui Lin died in January or February 245 and was succeeded by his elder son, Cui Shu (崔述). His younger son, Cui Sui (崔隨), served as a Supervisor of the Masters of Writing (尚書僕射) under the Jin dynasty. One of Cui Lin's grandsons, Cui Wei (崔瑋), served as a Right Commandant of the Guards of the Heir Apparent (太子右衛率) during the Jin dynasty.

== See also ==
- Lists of people of the Three Kingdoms
