= Bei Prefecture =

Zhou (prefecture) in imperial China

- Traditional Chinese: 貝州
- Hanyu Pinyin: Bèi Zhōu
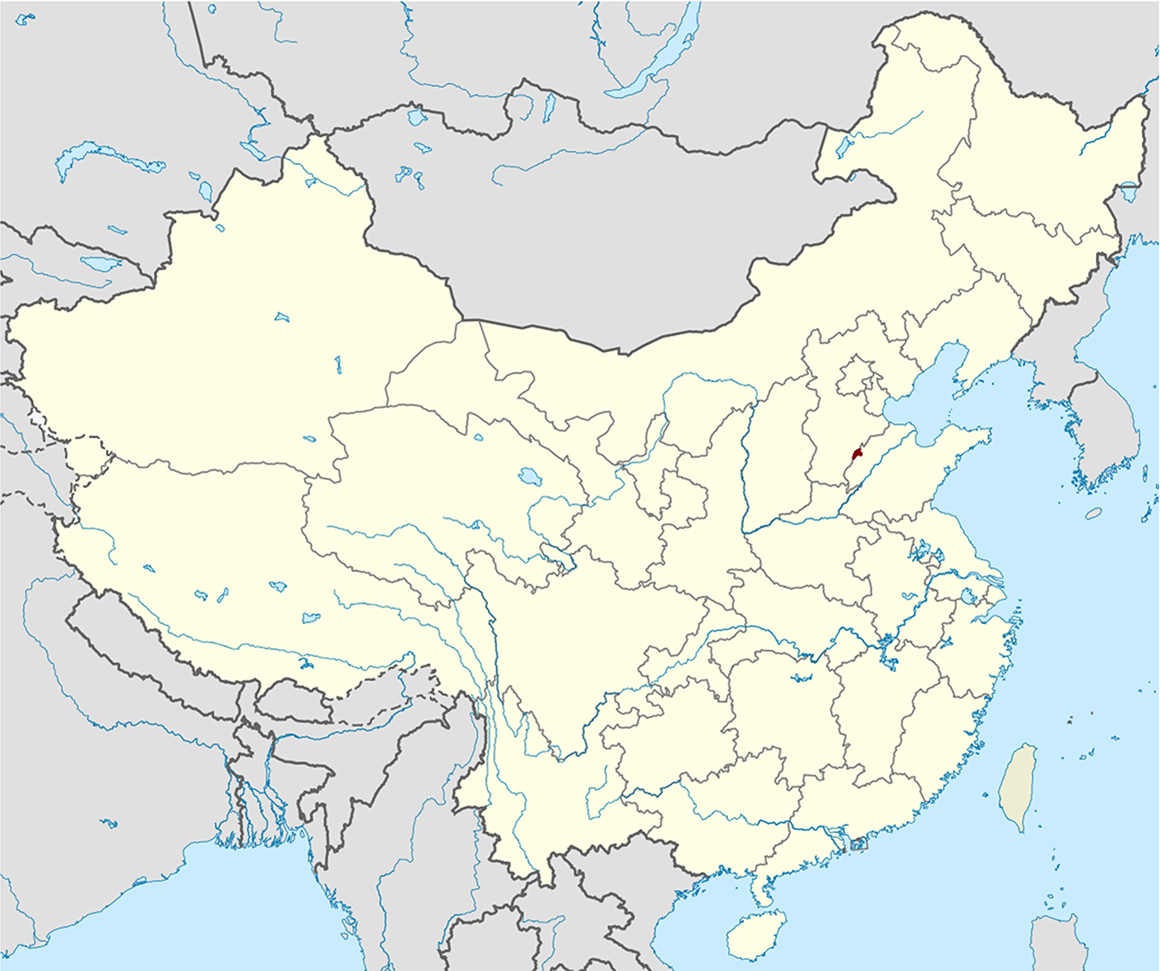
- Population
  - 740s or 750s: 834,757
- History
  - Preceded by: Qinghe Commandery
  - Created: 578 (Northern Zhou); 621 (Tang dynasty); 758 (Tang dynasty)
  - Succeeded by: En Prefecture
- Contained within
  - Circuit: Hebei Circuit

Beizhou or Bei Prefecture was a zhou (prefecture) in imperial China seated in modern Qinghe County in Hebei, China. It existed (intermittently) from 578 to 1048, when its name changed to En Prefecture after Wang Ze's rebellion in the prefecture.

== Geography ==
The administrative region of Bei Prefecture in the Tang dynasty is in the border area of southeastern Hebei and western Shandong. It probably includes parts of modern:

- Under the administration of Xingtai, Hebei:
  - Qinghe County
- Under the administration of Liaocheng, Shandong:
  - Linqing
- Under the administration of Dezhou, Shandong:
  - Xiajin County
  - Wucheng County
