= The Three Sui Quash the Demons' Revolt =

Shenmo fantasy novel

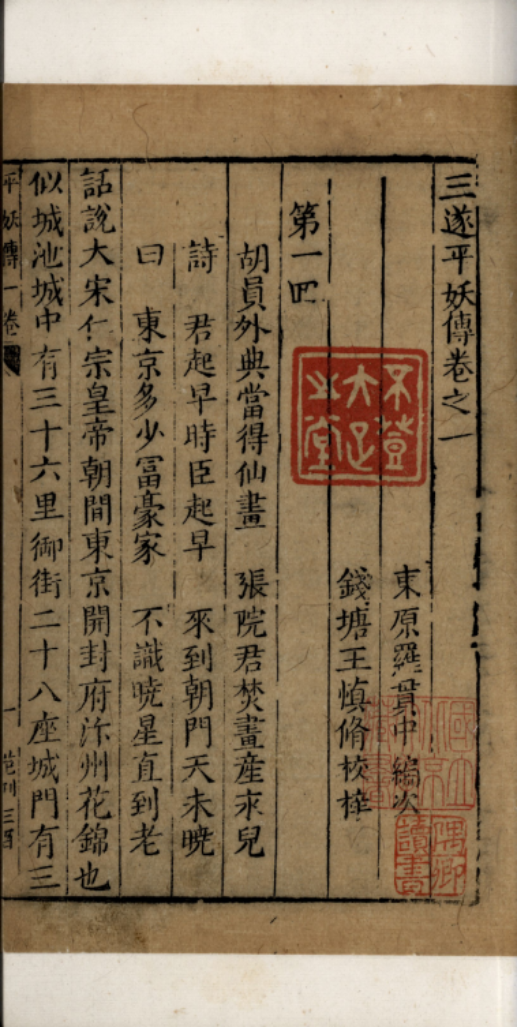
- First page from a 16th century printed edition of the novel, located in the Peking University
- Author: Luo Guanzhong (14th century); Feng Menglong (16th century)
- Original title: 三遂平妖傳 (Luo's version) 平妖傳 (Feng's version)
- Translator: Lois Fusek (2010; Luo's); Nathan Sturman (2008; Feng's); Patrick Hanan (2017, Luo's)
- Language: Chinese
- Genre: Chinese mythology, shenmo, fantasy, historical fiction
- Publication date: 16th century
- Publication place: Ming China
- Media type: Print

The Three Sui Quash the Demons' Revolt (Chinese: 三遂平妖傳; pinyin: Sān Suì píng yāo zhuàn), also translated as Quelling the Demons' Revolt and The Sorcerer's Revolt, is a Chinese novel attributed to the 14th-century novelist Luo Guanzhong, although the earliest extant version was compiled between 1571 and 1589, possibly by Wang Shenxiu (王慎脩). In 1620 Feng Menglong expanded the novel to forty chapters from the original twenty. A work in the shenmo genre, the novel blends comedy with the supernatural, and is an early work of vernacular fiction.

The story is very loosely based on Wang Ze's failed 1047–48 rebellion during the Song dynasty.

== Synopsis ==
The story is set in the Northern Song Dynasty. Wang Ze, a military commander, marries the sorceress Hu Yong'er. Hu was conceived after her mother burned an enchanted painting. She was taught magic from a fox spirit, enabling her to conjure armies with her spells. The three sorcerers, Zhang Luan, Bu Ji, and the Egg Monk Danzi Wang, join Wang after a series of adventures battling corrupt officials with their supernatural powers.

Wang leads a revolt to overthrow the government with the help of the sorcerers. The three sorcerers grow disillusioned with Wang's impropriety and defect to the government forces headed by Wen Yanbo, who had arrived to suppress the rebels. The Egg Monk disguises himself as a monk by the name of Zhuge Sui and aids the imperial generals Ma Sui and Li Sui. Together, the Three Suis defeat Wang and end the rebellion.

== History ==
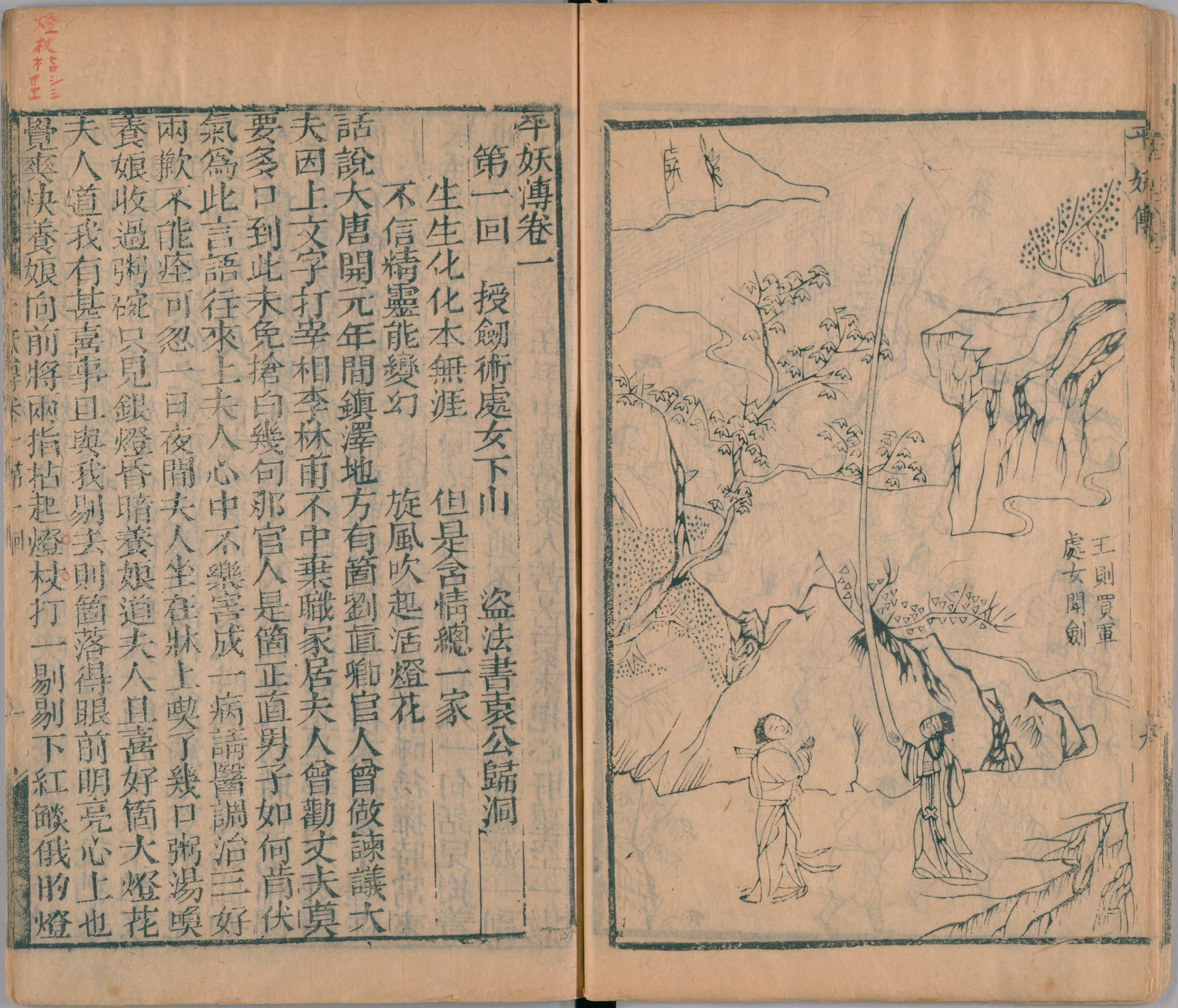
Early 19th century print and illustration of the novel

Legends of Wang Ze and his revolt, a historical event, were popular since the Yuan Dynasty and commonly embellished with elements from Chinese mythology. The novel attributed to Luo Guanzhong is a shenmo novel loosely based on Wang's revolt and published in the 16th century. It is not certain if Luo is the genuine author of the novel. The appearance of lijia, a social institution for local governance in rural areas, suggests that the text was written during or after the 15th century, but this may have been an alteration by a later editor. The original copies of the book attributed to Luo are lost. The only surviving works of Luo's earlier story are a revised edition published by Wang Shenxiu and the Nanjing Publishing House Shide tang. Three copies of the revised novel are still extant. It contains twenty chapters, separated into four juan (sections).

Feng Menglong wrote a new and longer version of the story to improve what he perceived as the novel's shortcomings. It was published by the studio Tianxu Zhai in 1620. The first edition was anonymously written and released as a work by the original author, but the second edition revealed that Feng was the new writer. His revision expanded the novel to forty chapters, of which fifteen precede the first chapter of the original novel. Parts of the older chapters were rewritten, or revised with entirely new passages. He provided backstories for many of the supporting characters that were introduced haphazardly in the original story. According to translator Nathan Sturman, Feng Menglong's version is one of the world's first psychological novels, which he compares to the Faust stories.

The novel was popular and critically acclaimed when it was originally released, but later faded into obscurity. Ota Tatsuo wrote the first extensive contemporary non-Chinese analysis of the work in 1967, and the scholarship and critical views of Patrick Hanan were important in following years.

== Translations ==
- The Sorcerer's Revolt. Translated by Nathan Sturman. Silk Pagoda. 2008. ISBN 978-1596545670.
- The Three Sui Quash the Demons' Revolt: A Comic Novel Attributed to Luo Guanzhong. Translated by Lois Fusek. University of Hawaii Press. 2010. ISBN 978-0-8248-3406-7.
- ——— (2017). Quelling the Demons' Revolt: A Novel from Ming China. Translated by Patrick Hanan. Introduction by Ellen Widmer and David Der-Wei Wang. New York: Columbia University Press. ISBN 9780231183062.

== Adaptations ==
- Legend of Sealed Book, a 1983 Chinese animation film
- 2023 "The Legend of the Sealed Book (The Magical Legend)".
