= Cao Zhi (Yungong) =

Cao Wei prince and Western Jin official (died 288)

Cao Zhi 曹志

Prince of Chen (陳王)
- Tenure: 27 December 232 (Note: Cao Rui's biography in the Sanguozhi recorded that Cao Zhi (Zijian) died on the gengyin day of the 11th month of the 6th year of the Taihe era of Cao Rui's reign. This date corresponds to 27 December 232 in the Julian calendar.) - ？

Prince of Jibei (济北王)
- Tenure: ? – 9 February 266

Duke of Juancheng (鄄城公)
- Tenure: 9 February 266 – 288
- Born: Unknown (Note: Cao Zhi's father was born in 192.)
- Died: 288; Luoyang, Henan
Names
- Family name: Cao (曹); Given name: Zhi (志); Courtesy name: Yungong (允恭)
Posthumous name
- Ding (定)
- House: House of Cao
- Father: Cao Zhi

Cao Zhi (Chinese: 曹志; died 288), courtesy name Yungong (允恭), posthumously known as Duke Ding of Juancheng (鄄城定公), was a son of Cao Zhi, Prince Si of Chen, and his unnamed concubine, and a grandson of Cao Cao. Besides his heritage, Cao Zhi was best known for his friendship with Sima Yan (Emperor Wu of Jin), and his support of Sima You remaining in the capital to help in the administration of the empire, against Yan's wishes.

== Background and life under Cao Wei ==
Cao Zhi was born in an unknown year to Cao Zijian and his unnamed concubine. At a young age, Zhi was studious and well known for his literary talents; he was also skilled in riding and archery. His father made him heir and praised him, "This shall be the protector of our clan." At some point, the Wei court granted Zhi the title of Duke of Mu Village (穆乡公), and his brother Cao Miao (曹苗) Duke of Gaoyang Village (高阳乡公); Cao Zijian wrote a memorial to thank the imperial court for the grants.

When Cao Zijian died in December 232, Cao Zhi inherited his peerage as Prince of Chen; he was later appointed Prince of Jibei. During the Jingchu era (237–239) of Cao Rui's reign, Cao Zijian was posthumously rehabilitated, and his literary works were allowed to be compiled and stored. Cao Zhi's fiefdom was also expanded to 990 households.

Despite his father's hopes, historical records did not indicate Cao Zhi's involvement in protecting the Cao clan from the Sima clan after the death of Cao Rui, the last Cao Wei ruler who wielded real power, in January 239. In February 249, Sima Yi became sole regent of the state of Cao Wei after he overthrew Cao Shuang in a coup. After Yi's death in September 251, his sons Sima Shi and Sima Zhao also became regents of Cao Wei.

In June 260, after the killing of Cao Mao, Zhao's son Sima Yan was ordered to receive the new emperor Cao Huang at Yecheng. Cao Zhi went to visit Sima Yan at night; their conversations lasted until the next morning, and Sima Yan was deeply impressed by Cao Zhi.

Less than six years after their meeting, on 4 February 266, Sima Yan forced Cao Huan (Cao Huang after changing his name) to abdicate. (Note: Sima Yan would crown himself emperor and found the Jin dynasty (266-420) on 8 February 266.) Five days later, Cao Huan was appointed Prince of Chenliu, while the former princes of Cao Wei were demoted to marquesses.

== During Emperor Wu's reign ==
As Duke of Juancheng, Cao Zhi held several positions, including stints as administrator at Leping, Zhangwu and Zhao Commanderies.

Cao Zhi was once asked by Sima Yan if the treatise "Liu Dai Lun" (六代论) was authored by his father. Zhi replied that the bibliography of his father's works should be consulted. When the treatise was not listed in the bibliography, Sima Yan asked about the author's identity; Zhi replied that the actual author was his clan elder Cao Jiong (曹冏), who attributed the treatise to Zijian due to the latter's fame. Sima Yan then declared the authorship matter closed. (Note: The "Liu Dan Lun" was later included in Wen Xuan; in his annotations to the work, Li Shan (李善) cited Sun Sheng's Weishi Chunqiu, which recorded that Cao Jiong's courtesy name was Yuanshou (元首). Cao Jiong was a clan elder of Cao Fang, and he wrote the treatise as a warning to Cao Shuang, who ignored his advice. Cao Jiong later became Administrator of Hongnong.)

In February or March 283, Sima Yan ordered the court to discuss about ordering his brother Sima You, the Prince of Qi, to leave the capital Luoyang for his fiefdom. Many officials, including Cao Zhi, opposed the motion. In particular, probably due to his father's rejection by Cao Rui, Cao Zhi was vehement in his opposition. After Sima Yan read Cao Zhi's memorial, he exclaimed in anger, "If even Cao Zhi could not understand my intentions, what more the others from across the Four Seas?" He then ordered the officials who had voiced their opposition to be put on trial. However, for Cao Zhi, he was merely relieved of his posts and sent back to his residence. (Note: Sima You himself died in late April 283.)

Soon after being sent back to his residence, Cao Zhi's mother died. In his mourning and grief, Cao Zhi became ill and unpredictable in his emotions. After his death in 288, there were discussions about giving him an unflattering posthumous name. An official named Cui Bao (崔褒), citing the story of Wei Ke (魏颗), (Note: According to the Zuo Zhuan, Wei Ke's father once informed Ke that after his death, his concubine was to be allowed to remarry. However, during a later illness, Wei Ke's father changed his mind and ordered the concubine to be sacrificed after his death. After the death of Wei Ke's father, Ke allowed the concubine to remarry, on the grounds that his father was of unsound mind when he made the second request.) opposed the motion. Eventually, Cao Zhi's posthumous name became "Ding".
