= Gucheng County, Hebei =

Gucheng County 故城县 Kucheng
- County
- Location in Hebei
- Coordinates: 37°21′N 115°58′E
- Country: People's Republic of China
- Province: Hebei
- Prefecture: Hengshui
- Time zone: UTC+8 (China Standard)
- Postal code: 053300

Gucheng (Chinese: 故城; pinyin: Gùchéng; lit. 'Old City') is county of Hengshui, Hebei province, China, bordering Dezhou City of Shandong to the east.

== Administrative divisions ==
Towns

- Zhengjiakou (郑家口镇), Xiazhuang (夏庄镇), Qinghan (青罕镇), Gucheng (故城镇), Wuguanzhai (武官寨镇), Raoyangdian (饶阳店镇), Juntun (军屯镇), Jianguo (建国镇), Xibantun (西半屯镇)

Townships

- Xinzhuang Township (辛庄乡), Lilao Township (里老乡), Fangzhuang Township (房庄乡), Sanlang Township (三朗乡)

== Climate ==
Gucheng has a cold Semi-arid climate (BSk), featuring very cold, dry winters influenced by the Siberian anticyclone and wet summers due to the effects of the East Asian Monsoon.

Climate data for Gucheng, elevation 27 m (89 ft), (1991–2020 normals, extremes 1981–2010)
| Month | Jan | Feb | Mar | Apr | May | Jun | Jul | Aug | Sep | Oct | Nov | Dec | Year |
|---|---|---|---|---|---|---|---|---|---|---|---|---|---|
| Record high °C (°F) | 16.7 (62.1) | 23.7 (74.7) | 30.8 (87.4) | 33.7 (92.7) | 40.5 (104.9) | 40.7 (105.3) | 41.1 (106.0) | 36.9 (98.4) | 37.5 (99.5) | 32.2 (90.0) | 26.5 (79.7) | 18.5 (65.3) | 41.1 (106.0) |
| Mean daily maximum °C (°F) | 3.6 (38.5) | 7.7 (45.9) | 14.5 (58.1) | 21.5 (70.7) | 27.3 (81.1) | 32.2 (90.0) | 32.2 (90.0) | 30.6 (87.1) | 27.1 (80.8) | 21.1 (70.0) | 12.1 (53.8) | 5.1 (41.2) | 19.6 (67.3) |
| Daily mean °C (°F) | −2.3 (27.9) | 1.4 (34.5) | 8.0 (46.4) | 15.0 (59.0) | 21.0 (69.8) | 25.9 (78.6) | 27.2 (81.0) | 25.6 (78.1) | 20.9 (69.6) | 14.4 (57.9) | 6.1 (43.0) | −0.5 (31.1) | 13.6 (56.4) |
| Mean daily minimum °C (°F) | −6.8 (19.8) | −3.4 (25.9) | 2.5 (36.5) | 9.1 (48.4) | 15.0 (59.0) | 20.1 (68.2) | 22.9 (73.2) | 21.6 (70.9) | 16.1 (61.0) | 9.2 (48.6) | 1.4 (34.5) | −4.7 (23.5) | 8.6 (47.5) |
| Record low °C (°F) | −21.1 (−6.0) | −16.0 (3.2) | −9.7 (14.5) | −2.0 (28.4) | 3.4 (38.1) | 10.2 (50.4) | 16.2 (61.2) | 12.6 (54.7) | 6.0 (42.8) | −2.1 (28.2) | −15.4 (4.3) | −21.0 (−5.8) | −21.1 (−6.0) |
| Average precipitation mm (inches) | 2.9 (0.11) | 7.9 (0.31) | 7.5 (0.30) | 29.0 (1.14) | 39.3 (1.55) | 61.8 (2.43) | 144.4 (5.69) | 125.1 (4.93) | 43.6 (1.72) | 28.4 (1.12) | 14.2 (0.56) | 3.6 (0.14) | 507.7 (20) |
| Average precipitation days (≥ 0.1 mm) | 1.8 | 3.1 | 2.4 | 5.1 | 6.0 | 7.7 | 10.8 | 9.5 | 5.9 | 4.8 | 3.9 | 2.4 | 63.4 |
| Average snowy days | 3.0 | 3.0 | 1.0 | 0.2 | 0 | 0 | 0 | 0 | 0 | 0 | 1.2 | 2.1 | 10.5 |
| Average relative humidity (%) | 62 | 58 | 53 | 57 | 61 | 60 | 76 | 81 | 74 | 67 | 68 | 66 | 65 |
| Mean monthly sunshine hours | 162.7 | 169.7 | 222.7 | 241.7 | 263.4 | 231.9 | 197.1 | 205.8 | 200.5 | 192.3 | 160.7 | 156.0 | 2,404.5 |
| Percentage possible sunshine | 53 | 55 | 60 | 61 | 60 | 53 | 44 | 49 | 55 | 56 | 53 | 53 | 54 |
Source: China Meteorological Administration
