= Luo Guanzhong =

14th-century Chinese novelist

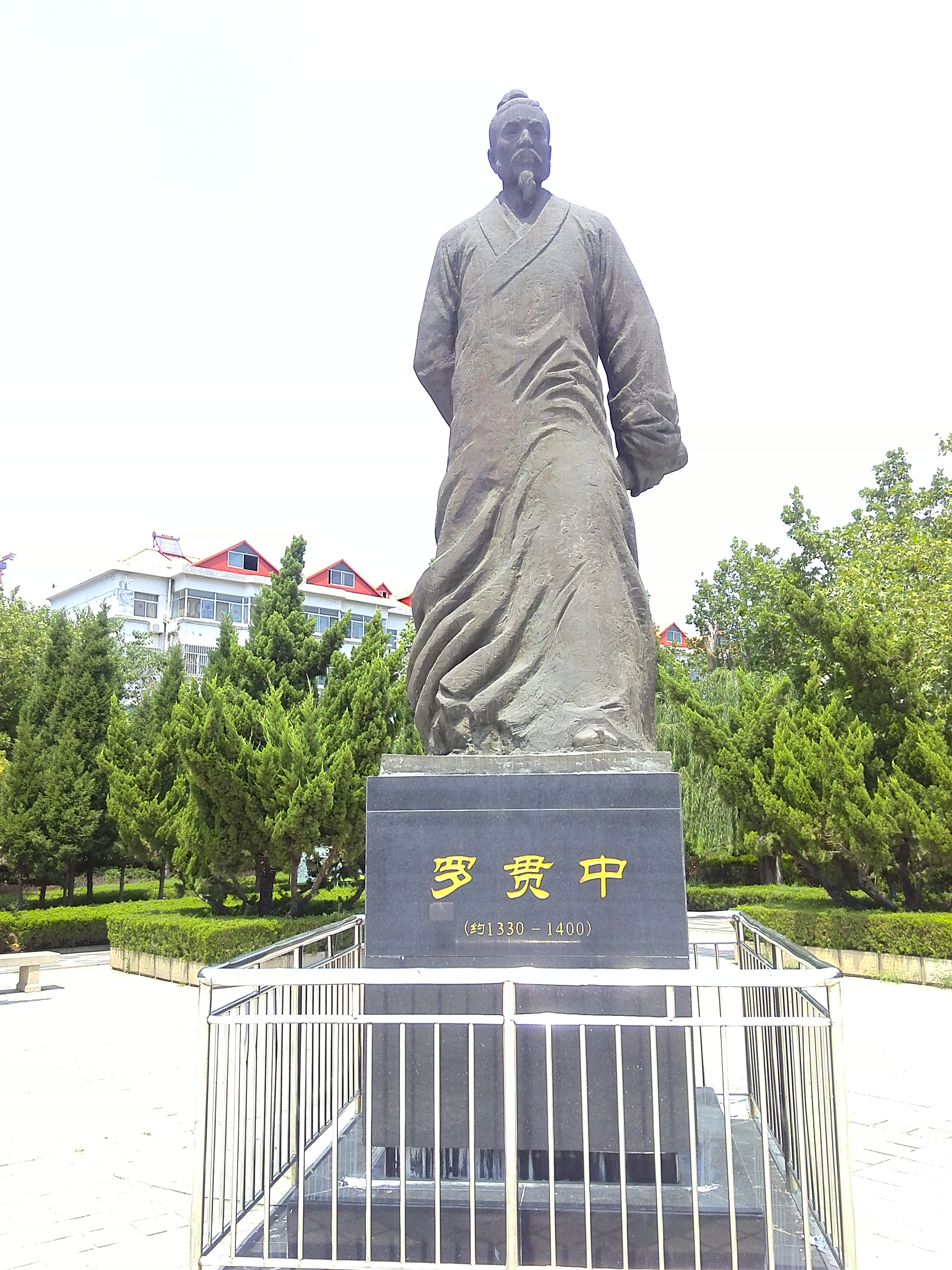
- Statue of Luo Guanzhong in Dongping Lake Square in Dongping County
- Born: c. 1280 or 1330
- Died: c. 1360 or 1400
- Writing career
- Pen name: Huhai Sanren
- Notable work: Romance of the Three Kingdoms

Luo Guanzhong
- Traditional Chinese: 羅貫中
- Simplified Chinese: 罗贯中
Transcriptions
Standard Mandarin
- Hanyu Pinyin: Luó Guànzhōng
- Wade–Giles: Lo Kuan-chung
- IPA: [lwǒ kwânʈʂʊ́ŋ]
Yue: Cantonese
- Yale Romanization: Lòh Gunjūng
- Jyutping: Lo^{4} Gun^{3} Zung^{1}

Birth name
- Traditional Chinese: 羅本
- Simplified Chinese: 罗本
Transcriptions
Standard Mandarin
- Hanyu Pinyin: Luó Běn
- Wade–Giles: Lo Pen
Yue: Cantonese
- Yale Romanization: Lòh Bún
- Jyutping: Lo^{4} Bun^{2}

Also known as
- Traditional Chinese: 湖海散人
- Simplified Chinese: 湖海散人
- Literal meaning: Leisure Man of Lakes and Seas
Transcriptions
Standard Mandarin
- Hanyu Pinyin: Húhǎi Sǎnrén
- Wade–Giles: Ho-hai San-jen
Yue: Cantonese
- Yale Romanization: Wùhhói Sáanyàhn
- Jyutping: Wu^{4} Hoi^{2} Saan^{2} Jan^{4}

Luo Ben (c. 1330–1400, or c.1280–1360), better known by his courtesy name Guanzhong (Mandarin pronunciation: [lwo kwanʈʂʊŋ]), was a Chinese novelist who lived during the Ming dynasty. He is also known by his pseudonym Huhai Sanren (Chinese: 湖海散人; pinyin: Húhǎi Sǎnrén; lit. 'Leisure Man of Lakes and Seas'). Luo Guanzhong is credited with writing Romance of the Three Kingdoms, one of the Four Great Classical Novels of Chinese literature.

== Identity ==
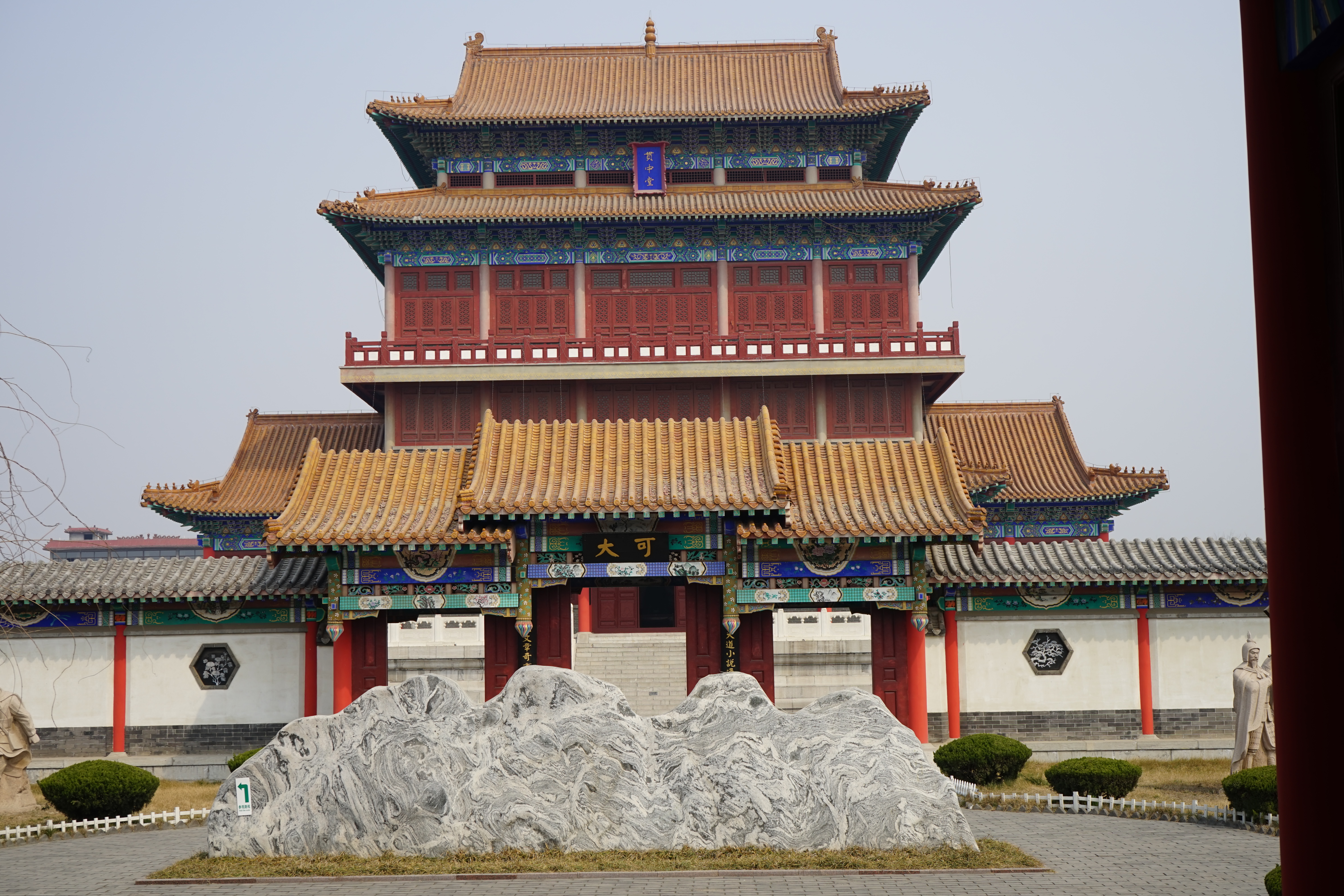
Luo Guanzhong Memorial, in Dongping County, Shandong

The location and date of Luo Guanzhong's birth are controversial. One possibility was that he was from Taiyuan, and lived in the late Yuan dynasty and early Ming dynasty by the record of his contemporary, the playwright Jia Zhongming (賈仲明), who said that he had met him in 1364. Another possibility was that he was born in Dongyuan, the province of Shandong, in about 1280 – 1360. Literary historians suggest other possibilities for his home, also including Hangzhou and Jiangnan.

According to Meng Fanren (孟繁仁), Luo Guanzhong can be identified in the pedigree of the Luo family, and Taiyuan is most likely his hometown. But, his name is not in this pedigree, and some people believe that pedigree of the Luo Family cannot prove that Luo Guanzhong is the author of Three Kingdoms. Some people doubt that If Luo Ben came from Taiyuan, why he had intimate knowledge of people's lives in Shandong, and he had taken all his time and energy to write about them, and not about people in Taiyuan. Some people believe that the source of Taiyuan statement, which was written by Jia Zhongming (賈仲明), is most likely wrong in handwritten copy. According to recent research, there were two people named Luo Guanzhong during this time (陈辽，Chen Liao): one was a drama artist who came from Taiyuan, and the other was the author of the novel who came from Dongping.

Recent research has suggested that his date of birth was between 1315 and 1318. But other sources state it was nearer to 1330.

== Works ==
The stories forming the bulk of Romance of the Three Kingdoms and Water Margin are thought to have been developed by many independent storytellers. Shi Nai'an is thought to be the first to assemble Water Margin into a unified work, and Luo subsequently brought it to the current form of 100 chapters. Luo is usually considered the author of Romance of the Three Kingdoms.

The Three Sui Quash the Demons' Revolt (平妖傳) is a shenmo fantasy story attributed to Luo with 20 chapters, developed from the original pieces of storytelling based on a rebellion at the end of the Northern Song, and later expanded by Feng Menglong (馮夢龍) into 40 chapters. Can Tang Wudai Shi Yanzhuan (殘唐五代史演義傳) is a chronicle of the end of the Tang dynasty and the following Five Dynasties and Ten Kingdoms period, a compilation of storytelling pieces based on the rebellion of Zhu Wen.

== See also ==
- Romance of the Three Kingdoms, text attributed to him
- Records of the Three Kingdoms, main source of influence for the Romance
- Chen Shou, writer of the Records who influenced Luo's writing

== Bibliography ==
- Can Tang Wudai Shi Yanzhuan (残唐五代史演義, "The End of Tang Dynasty and the Period of the Five Dynasties")
- Fenzhuang Lou (粉妝樓, "Cosmetical Building")
- Romance of the Three Kingdoms
- Sui Tang Zhizhuan (隋唐志傳)
- Sui Tang Liangchao Zhizhuan (隋唐兩朝志傳, "The Chronicle of the Sui and Tang Dynasties)
- The Three Sui Quash the Demons' Revolt (attributed)
- Water Margin (editing)
