= Zhuo Prefecture =

Historical administrative division in Hebei, China

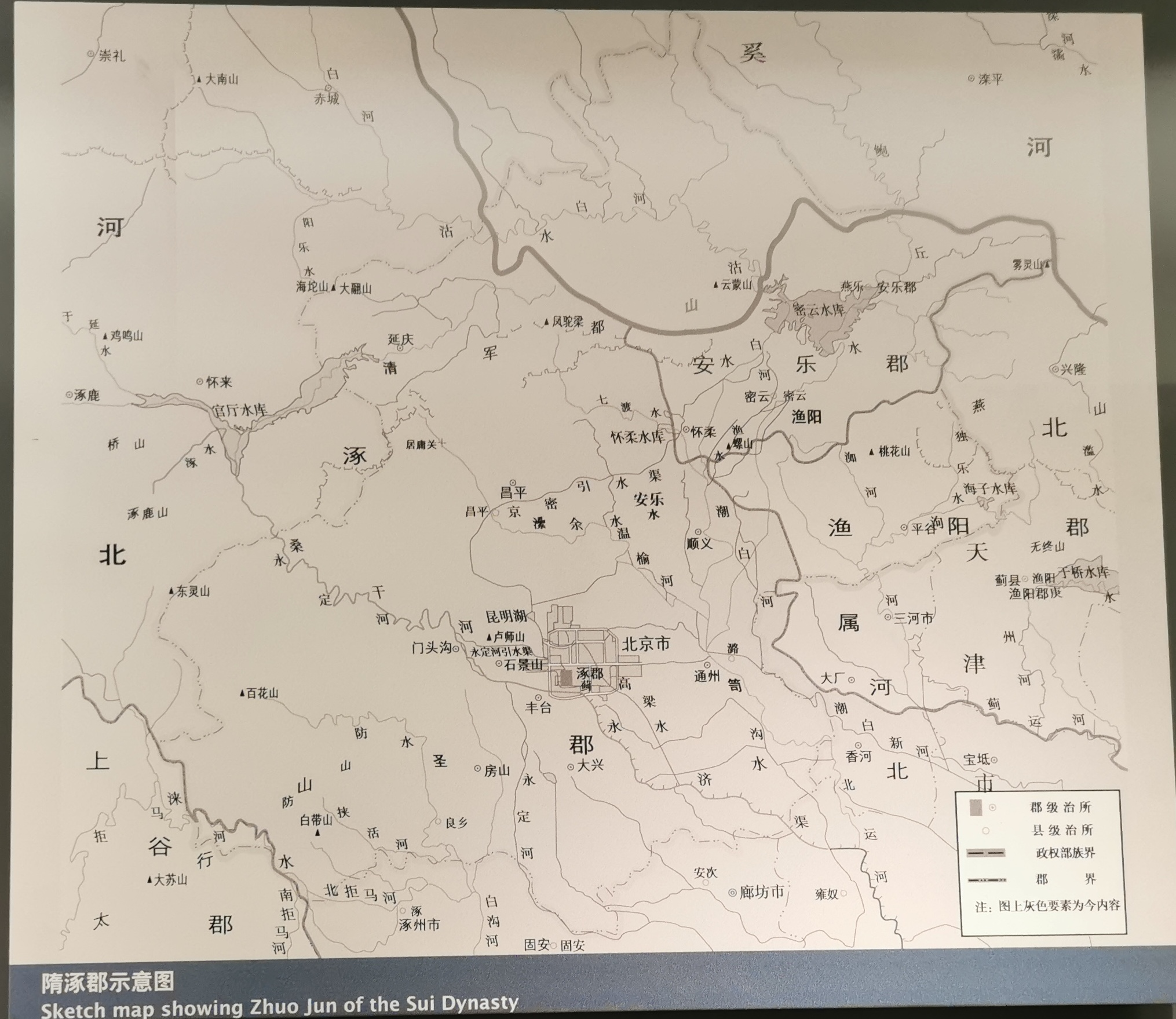
Zhuo Prefecture in Sui Dynasty

Zhuozhou or Zhuo Prefecture (Chinese: 涿州) was a zhou (prefecture) in imperial China in modern Zhuozhou, Hebei, China. It existed (intermittently) from 769 to 1913. It was one of the Sixteen Prefectures.

The modern city of Zhuozhou, created in 1986, retains its name.

== Geography ==
The administrative region of Zhuo Prefecture in Later Zhou is in modern central Hebei. It probably includes parts of modern:

- Under the administration of Baoding:
  - Zhuozhou
  - Xiong County
- Under the administration of Langfang:
  - Gu'an County
