= Nanjing Publishing House =

Chinese publishing house

Nanjing Publishing House is a publishing house in Nanjing, Jiangsu, China. The office of Nanjing Publishing House is located at Ginling Academy, No.53, Taipingmen Street, Xuanwu District, Nanjing.

== history ==
Established in October, 1988, Nanjing Publishing House is under Nanjing Press and Publication Administration located at No.8, Hunan Road, Nanjing. The publications including guidelines, policies and news of Government agencies, economics, technology and works of local writer. In 2001, Civilized City, the publication of Nanjing Publishing House won the 8th Jiangsu Book Excellence Awards second prize. As of 2007, Nanjing Publishing House had published 289 books. In 2013 and 2018, Nanjing Publishing House won Advanced Press and Publications Award in Jiangsu. In 2015, Nanjing Publishing House was awarded the title “General Reading Advance Organization” by Jiangsu Radio and Television Administration.

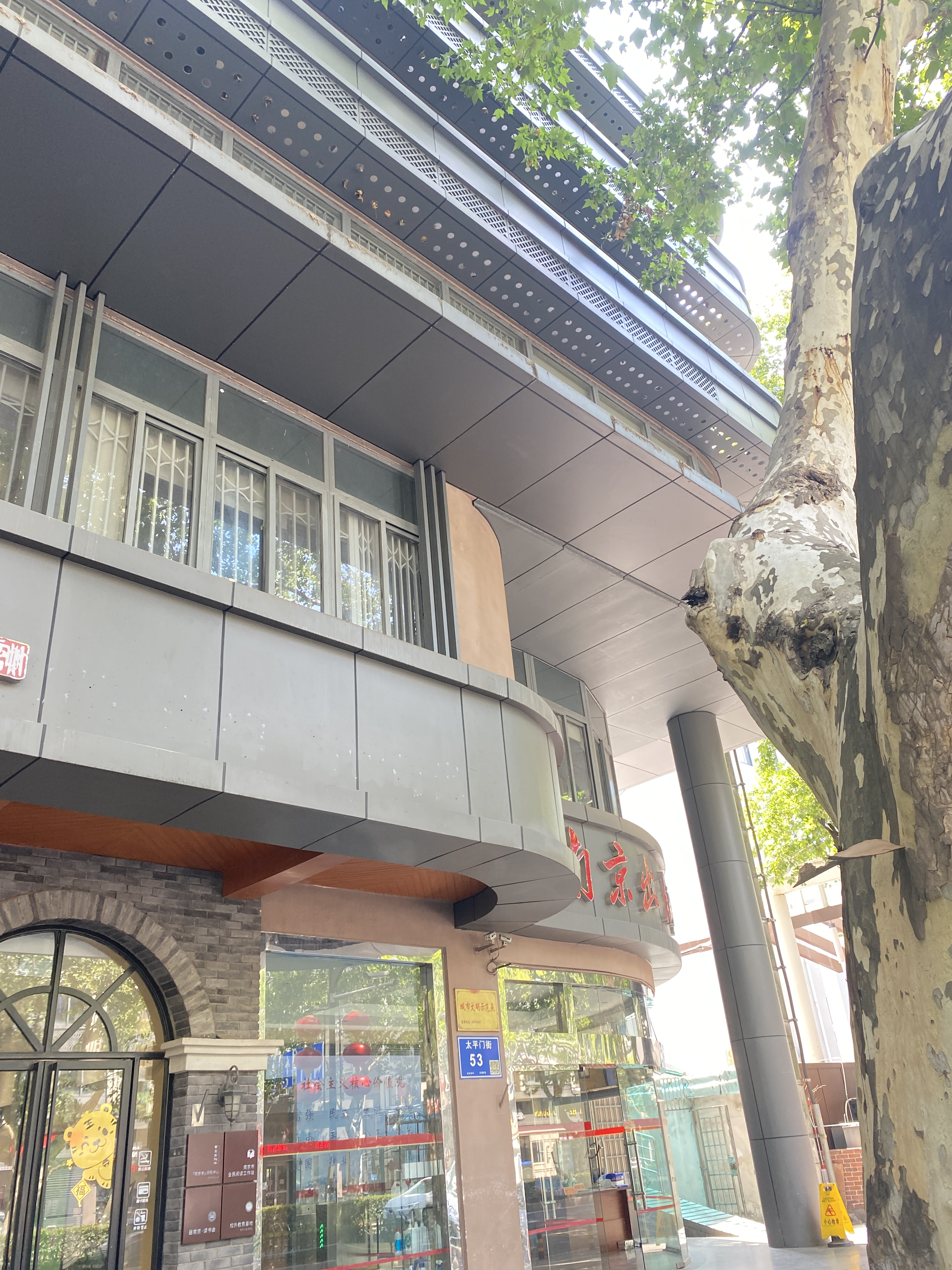
南京出版社大楼侧面

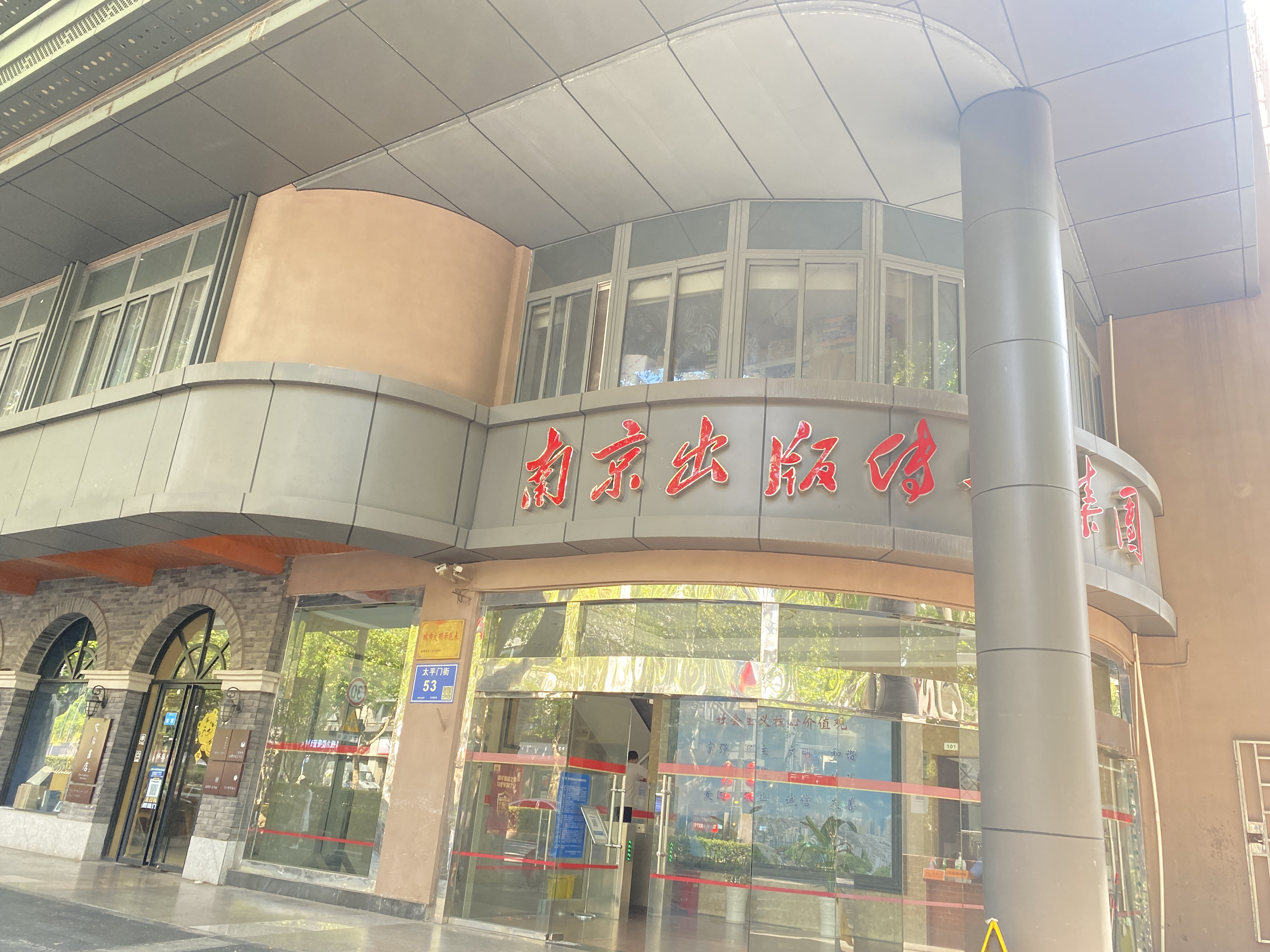
南京出版社大楼一角
