= Qinghe County, Hebei =

Qinghe County 清河县 Tsingho
- County
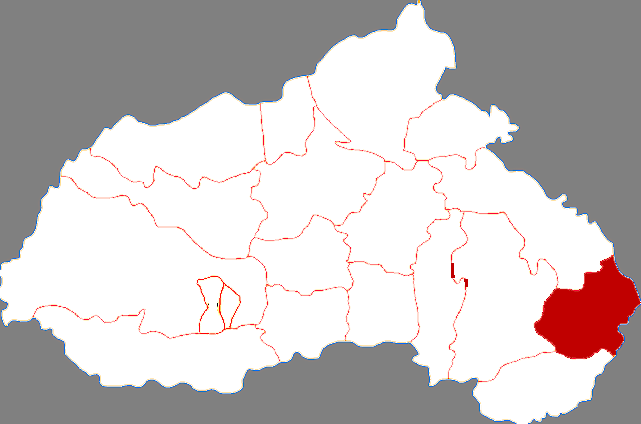
- Qinghe in Xingtai

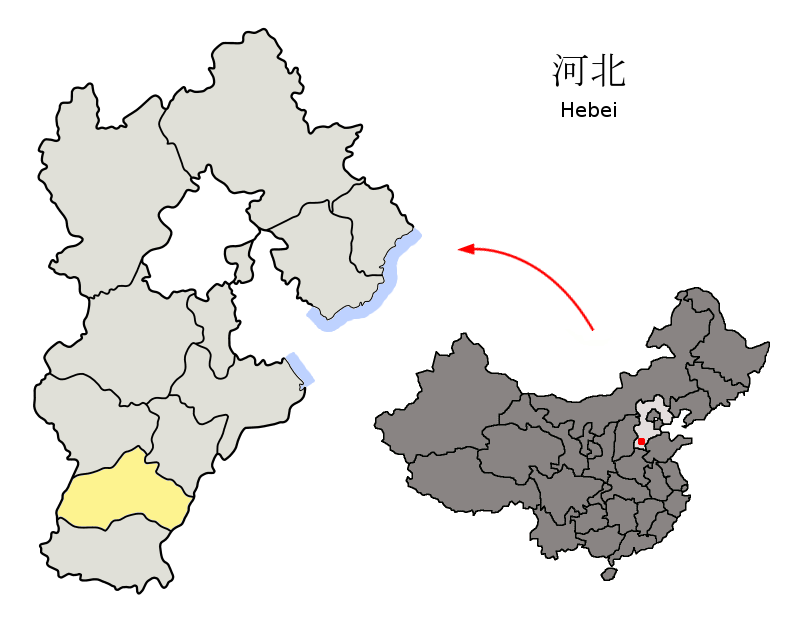
- Xingtai in Hebei
- Coordinates: 37°02′24″N 115°40′05″E
- Country: People's Republic of China
- Province: Hebei
- Prefecture-level city: Xingtai
- Time zone: UTC+8 (China Standard)

Qinghe County (simplified Chinese: 清河县; traditional Chinese: 清河縣; pinyin: Qīnghé Xiàn; lit. 'Clear River') is located in the south of Hebei province, China, bordering Shandong province to the east. It is the easternmost county-level division of the prefecture-level city of Xingtai.

== Administrative divisions ==
Towns:

- Gexianzhuang (葛仙庄镇), Lianzhuang (连庄镇), Youfang (油坊镇), Xielu (谢炉镇), Wangguanzhuang (王官庄镇), Baying (坝营镇)

== Climate ==
Climate data for Qinghe, elevation 32 m (105 ft), (1991–2020 normals, extremes 1981–present)
Month	Jan	Feb	Mar	Apr	May	Jun	Jul	Aug	Sep	Oct	Nov	Dec	Year
Record high °C (°F)	17.3 (63.1)	24.0 (75.2)	29.6 (85.3)	33.2 (91.8)	40.9 (105.6)	42.4 (108.3)	41.4 (106.5)	36.6 (97.9)	37.7 (99.9)	32.1 (89.8)	27.0 (80.6)	20.9 (69.6)	42.4 (108.3)
Mean daily maximum °C (°F)	3.7 (38.7)	8.0 (46.4)	14.8 (58.6)	21.7 (71.1)	27.6 (81.7)	32.3 (90.1)	32.3 (90.1)	30.6 (87.1)	27.3 (81.1)	21.4 (70.5)	12.4 (54.3)	5.3 (41.5)	19.8 (67.6)
Daily mean °C (°F)	−1.8 (28.8)	2.0 (35.6)	8.6 (47.5)	15.5 (59.9)	21.5 (70.7)	26.4 (79.5)	27.6 (81.7)	25.9 (78.6)	21.4 (70.5)	15.1 (59.2)	6.6 (43.9)	0.0 (32.0)	14.1 (57.3)
Mean daily minimum °C (°F)	−6.2 (20.8)	−2.7 (27.1)	3.2 (37.8)	9.8 (49.6)	15.8 (60.4)	20.9 (69.6)	23.4 (74.1)	21.9 (71.4)	16.6 (61.9)	9.9 (49.8)	2.1 (35.8)	−4.1 (24.6)	9.2 (48.6)
Record low °C (°F)	−20.6 (−5.1)	−16.8 (1.8)	−10.2 (13.6)	−1.9 (28.6)	4.2 (39.6)	9.8 (49.6)	16.5 (61.7)	13.1 (55.6)	5.0 (41.0)	−4.7 (23.5)	−16.2 (2.8)	−22.6 (−8.7)	−22.6 (−8.7)
Average precipitation mm (inches)	3.1 (0.12)	8.4 (0.33)	8.4 (0.33)	28.7 (1.13)	39.4 (1.55)	73.9 (2.91)	128.6 (5.06)	119.1 (4.69)	38.9 (1.53)	26.9 (1.06)	15.8 (0.62)	3.8 (0.15)	495 (19.48)
Average precipitation days (≥ 0.1 mm)	1.7	3.0	2.8	5.3	6.4	7.6	11.0	9.6	6.7	5.0	3.9	2.1	65.1
Average snowy days	2.5	2.8	0.8	0.2	0	0	0	0	0	0	0.8	1.9	9
Average relative humidity (%)	60	56	52	56	59	59	75	80	72	65	66	64	64
Mean monthly sunshine hours	166.2	170.7	225.3	235.4	265.2	239.4	207.0	208.5	201.4	198.5	167.4	163.0	2,448
Percentage possible sunshine	54	55	61	59	60	55	47	50	55	58	55	55	55
Source: China Meteorological AdministrationAll-time June low
