= Qinghe Commandery =

Historical political subdivision in China

Qinghe Commandery (Chinese: 清河郡) was a historical commandery of China, located in present-day southern Hebei and western Shandong.

The commandery was established during late Qin dynasty. In Western Han dynasty, the commandery administered 14 counties, including Qingyang (清陽), Dongwucheng (東武城), Yimu (繹幕), Ling (靈), Cuo (厝), Shu (鄃), Beiqiu (貝丘), Xincheng (信成), Shati (𢘿題), Dongyang (東陽), Xinxiang (信郷), Liao (繚), Zaoqiang (棗強) and Fuyang (復陽). The total population was 875,422, in 201,774 households in 2 AD. By 140 AD during the eastern Han dynasty, the number of counties had reduced to 7, and the population to 760,418, or 123,964 households. In 280 AD during the Western Jin dynasty, it administered 6 counties (Qinghe, Dongwucheng, Yimu, Beiqiu, Ling and Shu) with a population of 22,000 households. In several periods from Wentern Han to Jin dynasty, the commandery was converted to a principality and served as the fief of various imperial princes.

After the Sixteen Kingdoms period, the commandery was successively held by Northern Wei, Eastern Wei, Northern Qi and Northern Zhou, before being abolished during early Sui dynasty.

In Sui and Tang dynasties, Qinghe Commandery became an alternative name of Bei Prefecture (貝州). It administered 8 counties: Qinghe, Qingyang, Wucheng (武城), Jingcheng (經城), Linqing (臨清), Zhangnan (漳南), Liting (曆亭) and Shu. The total population in 741 AD was 834,757, or 100,015 households.
