= Chinese names in space =

Name of objects in space

There are a number of objects in the Solar System that have been named after Chinese people or places. Many of these are craters on the terrestrial planets but asteroids and exoplanets have also received Chinese names.

== Planetary features ==
=== Moon ===
- Bi Sheng (crater)
- Cai Lun (crater)
- Chang Heng (crater)
- Chang-Ngo (crater)
- Ching-Te (crater)
- Guang Han Gong
- Hegu (crater)
- Kuo Shou Ching (crater)
- Liu Hui (crater)
- Mons Heng
- Mons Hua
- Mons Tai
- Pei Xiu (crater)
- Rima Sung-Mei
- Rima Wan-Yu
- Shen Kuo (crater)
- Shi Shen (crater)
- Song Yingxing (crater)
- Statio Tianchuan
- Statio Tianhe
- Tai Wei (crater)
- Tianjin (crater)
- Tian Shi (crater)
- Tsu Chung-Chi (crater)
- Wan-Hoo (Van-Gu) (crater)
- Xu Guangqi (crater)
- Zhang Yuzhe (crater)
- Zhinyu (crater)
- Zi Wei (crater)

=== Mercury ===
- Chao Meng-Fu (crater)

=== Venus ===
- Ban Zhao (crater)

=== Mars ===
- Cangwu (crater)
- Daan
- Dunhuang
- Hsūanch'eng
- Kalpin
- Linpu
- Liu Hsin (crater)
- Pinglo
- Soochow
- Suzhi (crater)
- Xainza
- Zhigou

=== 951 Gaspra ===
- Tang-Shan (crater)

=== Ceres ===
- Shennong (crater)

=== Triton ===
- Ho Sulci
- Lo Sulci
- Monad Regio

=== Pluto ===
- Yutu Linea
- Zheng He Montes

== Minor planets ==
- 2425 Shenzhen
- 225088 Gonggong

== Stars and exoplanets ==
- Wangshu

== See also ==
- Chinese star names
