= Cai Lun =

Chinese Han dynasty official and paper innovator

- 蔡伦
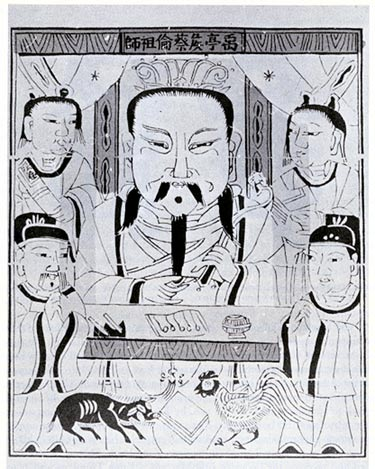
- Qing-era print depicting Cai as the patron of papermaking, 18th century (Note: This 18th-century print of Cai depicts him as the patron of papermaking with 4 attendants and a sacrificial pig and chicken; the Chinese text above says "Patron Saint Cai Lun". No contemporary likenesses of Cai survive.)
- Born: c. 50–62 CE; Guiyang Commandery, Han Empire (modern-day Leiyang, Hunan)
- Died: 121 CE (aged 59–71); Luoyang, Han Empire
- Occupations: Eunuch court official Court positions: Xiao Huangmen (c. 80 – 88); Zhongchang shi (88–121); Shangfang Ling (88/89–121)
- Known for: Development of paper and papermaking

Cai Lun
- Cai's name in traditional (top) and simplified (bottom) Chinese characters
- Traditional Chinese: 蔡倫
- Simplified Chinese: 蔡伦
Transcriptions
Standard Mandarin
- Hanyu Pinyin: Cài Lún
- Wade–Giles: Tsʻai4 Lun2
- IPA: [tsʰâɪ lwə̌n]
Wu
- Suzhounese: Tsha^{5} Len^{2}
Hakka
- Romanization: Tshai Lun
Yue: Cantonese
- Yale Romanization: Choi Lèuhn
- Jyutping: Coi3 Leon4
- IPA: [tsʰɔj˧ lɵn˩]
Southern Min
- Hokkien POJ: Chhoà Lûn
- Tâi-lô: Tshuà Lûn
Middle Chinese
- Middle Chinese: /tsʰɑi^{H} liuɪn/

Jingzhong (courtesy name)
- Traditional Chinese: 敬仲
- Simplified Chinese: 敬仲
Transcriptions
Standard Mandarin
- Hanyu Pinyin: Jìngzhòng
- Wade–Giles: Ching4-Chung4

Cai Lun (Chinese: 蔡伦; courtesy name: Jingzhong (敬仲); c. 50–62 – 121 CE), formerly romanized as Ts'ai Lun, was a Chinese eunuch court official of the Eastern Han dynasty. He occupies a pivotal place in the history of paper due to his addition of pulp via tree bark and hemp ends which resulted in the large-scale manufacture and worldwide spread of paper. Although Cai is traditionally regarded as the inventor of paper, earlier forms of paper have existed since the 3rd century BCE, so his contributions were an innovation, rather than an invention.

Born in Guiyang Commandery (in what is now Leiyang), Cai arrived at the imperial court in Luoyang by 75 CE, where he served as a chamberlain for Emperor Ming, and then as Xiao Huangmen, an imperial messenger for Emperor Zhang. To assist Lady Dou in securing her adopted son as designated heir, he interrogated Consort Song and her sister, who then killed themselves. When Emperor He ascended the throne in 88 CE, Dou awarded Cai with two positions: Zhongchang shi, a political counselor to the emperor that was the highest position for eunuchs of the time, and also as Shangfang Ling, where Cai oversaw the production of instruments and weapons at the Palace Workshop.

Despite Emperor He's successful coup d'état against the Dou family in 92 CE, Cai was undisturbed by his former ally's downfall. His position in the Palace Workshop increased in scope; he became responsible for the production of ceremonial weapons, which the Hou Hanshu reports were of exemplary craftsmanship. However, Cai's most noted innovation was in 105 CE, when he substantially improved the papermaking process with the use of tree bark, hemp waste, old rags, and fishnets. His new type of paper quickly displaced the bamboo and wooden slips used until then, and Cai received wealth and fame throughout the empire. In 110 CE, Lady Deng, who had become the empress dowager to the young Emperor An, appointed Cai to oversee 100 scholars' new edition of the Five Classics. Cai was rewarded for his imperial service in 114 CE; he received the title of marquis, and was enfeoffed lord of Longting, a small village. When his ally Deng died in 121 CE, Cai was ordered to the Ministry of Justice because of his involvement in the death of the emperor's grandmother, Consort Song. Ashamed at his predicament and expecting to be sentenced to death, he committed suicide that year and died in the capital city in which he had spent almost his entire adult life.

Cai's improvements to paper-making are considered to have had an enormous impact on human history, and of those who created China's Four Great Inventions—the compass, gunpowder, papermaking and printing—Cai is the only early figure whose name is known. Although in China he is revered in ancestor worship, deified as the god of papermaking, and appears in Chinese folklore, he is mostly unknown outside of East Asia. His hometown in Leiyang remains an active center of paper production.

== Sources ==
The main source of information on Cai Lun is just 300 characters in volume 78 of the Hou Hanshu (後漢書; Book of the Later Han), an official history compiled by the Liu Song dynasty historian and politician Fan Ye. Tsien Tsuen-hsuin, a modern sinologist, noted that while Fan's account is the most comprehensive, it is problematic as it was written nearly 300 years after Cai's death. The primary source Fan used was the 2nd-century Dongguan Hanji (東觀漢記; History of the Eastern Han), in which Yan Du is credited as the author of Cai's biography. Yan's brief 70-character account is near-contemporary but only survives in a reconstructed state from a lost original. (Note: Dongguan Hanji 20/2b: "蔡倫字敬仲桂陽人為中常侍有才學盡忠重慎每至休沐輒閉門絶賔客曝體田野典作尚方造意用樹皮及敝布魚網作紙〈案一本作倫典尚方作紙用故麻名麻紙木皮名糓紙魚紙名網紙〉元興元年奏上之帝善其能自是莫不用天下咸稱蔡侯紙" Tsien (1962, p. 136): "Cai Lun, courtesy name Jingzhong, a native of Guiyang Commandery, served [at the court] as Zhongchang shi. He was a man of talent and learning, loyal and careful. When he was off duty, he usually shut himself up and refused to see visitors but exposed himself to nature. When he was charged with the office of Shangfang Ling, he initiated the idea of making paper from tree bark, old rags and fishing nets. He submitted the process to the emperor in the first year of Yuanxing [105] and received praise for his ability. From this time, paper has been in use and is universally called the 'paper of Cai Lun'".) Another older source is a brief mention by the 3rd-century scholar Dong Ba, (董巴) who is quoted referencing Cai's papermaking accomplishments in the 10th-century leishu encyclopedia Taiping Yulan (Readings of the Taiping Era). (Note: See Tsien (1962, p. 137) for a full English translation of Dong Ba's account in the Taiping Yulan 605/7a.)

Later history books, such as the Song dynasty's Shiwu Jiyuan (事物紀原; Compound Source of Matters and Facts), also include Cai and his work in papermaking. However, some major history books, such as the Annals of the Later Han and Zizhi Tongjian (Comprehensive Mirror in Aid of Governance) do not mention Cai's papermaking achievements. (Note: While Cai's contributions to the papermaking process are not included in the Zizhi Tongjian, it did make multiple brief references to Cai's political activities in volumes 49 and 50.) Sinologist T. H. Barrett suggested this was because "Cai Lun was, after all, a palace eunuch, precisely the sort of person normally viewed with antagonism by the regular bureaucrats who controlled the writing of official (and even most unofficial) history."

== Life and career ==
=== Birth and background ===
Cai Lun was born in Guiyang Commandery (桂阳郡; modern-day Leiyang, Hunan province) (Note: Hou Hanshu (78/68:2513–14): "蔡伦字敬仲，桂陽人也。" "Cai Lun's courtesy name was Jingzhong, and he was from Guiyang Commandery.") in the Eastern Han dynasty (25–220 CE). (Note: The Han dynasty Guiyang Commandery is not to be confused with the unrelated modern-day Guiyang County or the city of Guiyang.) His exact year of birth is unknown; estimates include c. 50, c. 57, and c. 62. (Note: Sinologist Rafe de Crespigny suggested that Cai was the same age as Zheng Zhong, a fellow eunuch, whose birth year is also unknown.) Other than being born into a poor family, virtually nothing is known of his early life. Guiyang was a southern commandery, where Han Chinese had immigrated for hundreds of years to plant and cultivate rice. Legends suggest there was a pool near his home, south of which was a stone mortar that Cai would later use for papermaking.

=== Early imperial court service ===
It is not known how Cai came to be in the service of the imperial court in Luoyang (modern-day Luoyang, Henan province), which was distant from his birthplace. The Hou Hanshu reports that he was first employed during the end of the Yongping era (58–75) of Emperor Ming. (Note: Hou Hanshu (78/68:2513–14): "以永平末始给事宫掖" "He began serving in the palace at the end of the Yongping era". Hunter & Hunter (1978, p. 50): At the close of the reign of Yongping, Cai Lun was employed at the court".) The site of modern Guiyang Commandery was known to have had various iron mines at the time, so the former director of the Paper Museum in Tokyo, Kiyofusa Narita, suggested that "through the assistance of some who were in charge of the iron foundry, he found opportunity to go to the capital city". Narita cited Cai's future court appointment to oversee the production of weapons, especially swords, as evidence that he must have learned the skills to do so earlier in his life, likely from the iron foundry. Alternatively, if there is any truth to the various folktales about Cai, his supposed habits of trickery may have helped him receive a court appointment.

Cai is known to have been a eunuch official in 75 CE, although it is possible he was employed somewhat earlier in the Yongping era; sinologist Rafe de Crespigny suggested this was in the early 70s. In the Han dynasty, eunuchs were employed in imperial service and were the only people eligible for certain specialized tasks, such as watching over the imperial harem and the imperial household; there were also certain promotions available exclusively for them. Cai's position was probably as a liaison between the privy council and the emperor, and likely involved duties akin to a chamberlain for the imperial family. Narita notes Cai's role meant he would have had many chances to become acquainted with the most powerful people in the empire. Around 80 CE, during the subsequent Jianchu era (76–84) under Emperor Zhang, Cai was promoted to a Xiao Huangmen (小黄門; "Attendant at the Yellow Gates"). (Note: Hou Hanshu (78/68:2513–14): "建初中，为小黄門。" "At the beginning of the Jianchu era, he served as Xiao Huangmen". Carter (1925, p. 3): "During the period Jianchu (76–84), Cai Lun formed part of the Imperial Guard.") The positions, with a salary-rank of 600 shi or dan, (Note: During the Han dynasty, the power a government official exercised was determined by his annual salary-rank, measured in grain units known as dan (石 or shi, a unit of volume, approximately 35 litres (0.99 US bsh)). See Government of the Han dynasty#Salaries for further information.) involved delivering and receiving messages between the imperial palace apartments and the outside court.

=== Palace intrigue and workshop ===
In 79 CE, Liu Qing, Zhang's son from his concubine Consort Song, had been the designated heir, secured by the favor of Empress Ma. However, Ma's death later in 79 CE made Lady Dou the empress, and—aiming to develop her family's power—she adopted Prince Zhao with the intention of installing him as heir. As a result, when Song became ill in 82 and asked for herbs, Dou falsely accused her of planning to use the herbs for witchcraft against Zhang. Dou then ordered Cai to interrogate Consort Song and her sister, another imperial consort, to force a confession; they both killed themselves. Believing Dou's accusation, Zhang replaced Liu Qing with Prince Zhao as heir.

Prince Zhao, ruling as Emperor He, was 10 years old at his accession in 88 CE, so Dou took control as empress dowager and secured her authority by giving various positions to her four brothers, particularly Dou Xian, who promoted Cai to Zhongchang shi (中常侍; "Regular Attendant") for his loyalty. Cai served as a private counselor to He in political matters; (Note: Hou Hanshu (78/68:2513–14): "及和帝即位，转中常侍，豫参帷幄。" "After Emperor He took the throne, he became Zhongchang shi, and he participated in key strategic decisions." Carter (1925, p. 3): "The Emperor He, on coming to the throne, knowing that Cai Lun was a man full of talent and zeal, appointed him a privy counsellor." Hunter & Hunter (1978, p. 50): "The Emperor He, upon his accession, learning of Cai Lun's superior qualities and talents, named him private counsellor".) this post gave Cai a salary-rank of 2000 shi, and was the highest eunuch-exclusive position, which also made him a chief eunuch of the palace. In the Hou Hanshu, Cai was characterized as, in the words of de Crespigny, "honest, cautious and a good judge of policy". (Note: Hou Hanshu (78/68:2513–14): "伦有才學，尽心敦慎，数犯严颜，匡弼得失。每至休沐，辄闭門绝宾，暴体田野。" "Cai Lun was talented and learned. He used his full effort and was careful. He often was willing to correct the wrongs, even when it offended the stern faced [those in power]. When he had vacation days, he would close his door and not entertain guests, but spent time in the field.") Cai was also designated Shangfang Ling (尚方令; "Prefect of the Palace Workshop" or "Prefect of the Masters of Techniques") later in 88 or 89 CE. (Note: Hou Hanshu (78/68:2513–14): "后加位尚方令。" "He was later given the additional post of Shangfangling.") While in this eunuch-only position, he would have been responsible for the production of instruments and weapons for imperial use. The role had a salary-rank of 600 shi—though this was in addition to the 2000 shi from his continued Zhongchang shi post.

When Emperor He came of age in 92 CE he led various officials, especially Zheng Zhong, in a coup d'état to overthrow the Dou family. Cai was not involved in their removal, and though he was previously allied with the family, he was undisturbed by the Emperor's coup. In 97 CE, his position as Shangfang Ling expanded in scope, as he became responsible for ceremonial swords and other items. The Hou Hanshu describes his craftsmanship as high-quality and a model for later generations. (Note: Hou Hanshu (78/68:2513–14): "永元九年，监作秘剑及诸器械，莫不精工坚密，为后世法。" "In the 9th year of the Yongyuan era [97], he oversaw the manufacturing of imperial swords and other equipment, which were all made carefully and well, and he became an example for later generations." Carter (1925, p. 3): "In the ninth year of the period Yongyuan (97) Cai Lun became inspector of public works. By his plans and according to his arrangements, engineers and workmen made, always with the best of materials, swords and arms of various sorts. Later generations could do no better than imitate his methods of work." Hunter & Hunter (1978, pp. 50, 52): "In the ninth year of the reign of Yongyuan (97), Cai Lun was made inspector of works and through his efforts the engineers and workmen by the use of fine materials and skill produced swords and arms that served as models for future generations.")

=== Development of paper ===
Woodcuts depicting the five seminal steps in ancient Chinese papermaking. From the 1637 Tiangong Kaiwu of the Ming dynasty.

Writing had a long history in China. The most common writing surfaces were bamboo and wooden slips, with wood for short text and bamboo for lengthy text. These media were inconvenient as they were awkward to store, heavy, and difficult to write on. After Meng Tian purportedly created an animal-hair brush for writing in 3rd-century BCE, silk and cloth emerged as alternatives that addressed these issues, but they were too expensive for widespread use. The absence of a practical solution motivated continued experimentation with different materials. In 105, Cai publicly declared that he had invented a new composition for paper with a new papermaking process. Cai's pulp solution proved the most effective solution. His process still used bamboo, but also introduced hemp waste, old rags, fishnets, and most importantly, bark from trees (likely mulberry). The materials were boiled to a pulp that was beaten with a wood or stone mallet before being mixed with a large amount of water. The resulting mixture was then processed with wooden sieves and the excess water removed, leaving the paper finished once dry. The paper that resulted from this method is often referred to as "Cai Hou paper" (蔡侯纸). This event and its context are relayed in an often cited passage of the Hou Hanshu: (Note: English translations of the excerpt are included in Carter (1925, p. 3), Hunter & Hunter (1978, pp. 50, 52), Tsien (1962, p. 136) and Tsien (1985, p. 40).)

自古書契多編以竹簡，其用縑帛者謂之為紙。縑貴而簡重，並不便於人。倫乃造意，用樹膚、麻頭及敝布、魚網以為紙。元興元年奏上之，帝善其能，自是莫不從用焉，故天下咸称蔡侯紙。
In ancient times writings and inscriptions were generally made on tablets of bamboo or on pieces of silk called chih. But silk being costly and bamboo heavy, they were not convenient to use. Cai Lun then initiated the idea of making paper from the bark of trees, hemp, old rags, and fishing nets. He submitted the process to the emperor in the first year of Yuanxing [105] and received praise for his ability. From this time, paper has been in use everywhere and is universally called the "paper of Lord Cai."

— Hou Hanshu 78/68:2513–14 (Note: Hou Hanshu (78/68:2513–14): "自古書契多編以竹簡，其用縑帛者謂之為紙。縑貴而簡重，並不便於人。倫乃造意，用樹膚、麻頭及敝布、魚網以為紙。元興元年奏上之，帝善其能，自是莫不從用焉，故天下咸称蔡侯紙。" Tsien (1962, p. 136): In ancient times writings and inscriptions were generally made on tablets of bamboo or on pieces of silk called chih. But silk being costly and bamboo heavy, they were not convenient to use. Cai Lun then initiated the idea of making paper from the bark of trees, hemp, old rags, and fishing nets. He submitted the process to the emperor in the first year of Yuanxing [105] and received praise for his ability. From this time, paper has been in use everywhere and is universally called the "paper of Lord Cai.")

Many legends about the inspiration for Cai's invention exist; one of the most popular said that Cai was inspired by watching paper wasps make their nests. Tsien suggested that Cai was inspired by the people of his birthplace, who used bark from mulberry trees to create cloth as a writing surface. Irrespective of its origin, in 105 CE, Cai's new papermaking process both impressed He and earned him fame throughout the empire.

=== Final years ===
After the infant Emperor Shang's eight-month reign, in 106 CE Emperor He was succeeded by 13-year-old Emperor An, while Lady Deng ruled as empress dowager. Both Cai and Zheng maintained influence in Deng's court. In 110 CE, Deng assembled more than 100 scholars—including Liu Zhen, Liu Taotu and Ma Rong—in the Eastern Pavilion of the palace to begin creating a definitive edition of the Five Classics. She appointed Cai to oversee and supervise the production; de Crespigny said that this meant Cai "was seriously concerned with scholarship". (Note: Hou Hanshu (78/68:2513–14): "四年，帝以經傳之文多不正定，乃选通儒谒者劉珍及博士良史诣东观，各雠校汉家法，令伦监典其事。" "In the fourth year of the Yuanchu era, the Emperor, finding that the various classics often did not have standard texts, selected the yezhe Liu Zhen, along with other well-learned people and good officials to gather at Dongguan to edit and correct the Han laws in accordance, and made Cai Lun in charge of the project.") In 114 CE, he was awarded the title of marquis and the imperial court enfeoffed him as the lord of Longting, a small village of 300 families in modern-day Yang County, Shaanxi. (Note: Hou Hanshu (78/68:2513–14): "元初元年，邓太后以伦久宿卫，封为龍亭侯，邑三百户。" "In the first year of the Yuanchu era, Empress Dowager Deng, on account that Cai Lun had long been in service, created him the Marquess of Longting with a fief of 300 households.") Later that year Zheng died and Cai succeeded him as the head of the Dowager's household.

Emperor An assumed power after Deng's death in 121 CE, even though the court was dominated by the influence of Empress Yan Ji and her brothers. Remembering Cai's part in the death of his grandmother, Consort Song, An ordered Cai to report to the Ministry of Justice to answer the charges, and presumably sentence him to death. Ashamed that the Emperor would send him to death in a dishonorable way, Cai bathed and dressed in formal clothes before killing himself by drinking poison. (Note: Hou Hanshu (78/68:2513–14): "伦初受窦后讽旨，诬陷安帝祖母宋贵人。及太后崩，安帝始亲万机，敕使自致廷尉。伦耻受辱，乃沐浴整衣冠，饮药而死。國除。" "Previously, Cai Lun, under Empress Dou's orders, made false accusations against Emperor An's grandmother Consort Song. After the Empress Dowager's death, Emperor An began to oversee all affairs of state. He ordered Cai Lun to self-report to the ministry of justice. Cai Lun did not want to be humiliated, and therefore, after bathing and putting on formal wear, drank poison and died. His fief was cancelled.")

== Legacy ==
=== Global influence ===
==== Historical assessment ====
Due to modern archeological investigations, it is now certain that different forms of paper existed in China as early as 3rd-century BCE, (Note: Prior to this, older sources such as David (1935, p. 115) gave the date as 1st-century BCE; Tsien (1985, p. 38) and Eliot & Rose (2009, p. 99) (citing Tsien (1985)) gave the 2nd-century BCE as the oldest; Barrett (2011, p. 203) gave the 3rd-century BCE and noted that Tsien updated his 2nd edition of Written on Bamboo and Silk: The Beginnings of Chinese Books and Inscriptions (2011), to give the date as 3rd-century as well.) though the findings do not necessarily discount the credit given to Cai. The Chinese scholar Tsien Tsuen-hsuin explained that the term used in Cai's ancient biography, zào yì (造意), can be understood as "to initiate the idea", meaning that he furthered the ongoing process with the addition of important materials. Additionally, Cai is responsible for the earliest known use of tree bark and hemp as ingredients for paper, and it is clear that paper did not see widespread use in China until Cai's improvements. As such, scholars have revised his contributions as ones that furthered an ongoing process instead of a sudden discovery. (Note: Wilkinson (2018, p. 1029) concludes that "The consensus today is that although Cai did not invent paper, he may have improved the way it was manufactured or cut the costs (using the bark of trees, cloth rags, and old fishing nets).") However, due to the pivotal significance of his improvements and the resulting spread of paper use throughout China, Cai continues to be traditionally credited with inventing paper. There is also speculation that Cai was the patron of this achievement and took credit from someone else, as Feng Dao may have done with his improvements to printing.

==== Spread of paper ====
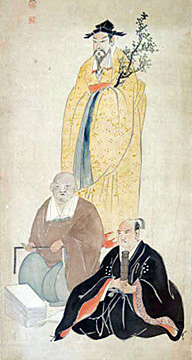
The Three Gods of Paper-making, Cai Lun (in the middle) with the Korean monk Damjing (on the left), who brought the art to Japan, and Mochizuki Seibei (who brought the art to Nishijima (西嶋)). Kept in the Minobu Town Museum of History and Folklore.

Cai's improvements to paper and the papermaking process are considered especially impactful to human history, as they resulted in the spread of literature and knowledge around the world, and advancements in communications. However, Cai is only somewhat known outside East Asia and is often excluded from major encyclopedias. The scholar of paper history, Thomas Francis Carter, drew parallels between Cai and Johannes Gutenberg, the inventor of the first printing press which using movable type, calling them "spiritual father and son" respectively. In his 1978 book, The 100: A Ranking of the Most Influential Persons in History, Michael H. Hart ranked him 7th, above figures such as Gutenberg, Christopher Columbus, Albert Einstein and Charles Darwin. In 2007, Time ranked him among the "Best Inventors" of all time.

After Cai's efforts in 105 CE, a renowned paper maker who may have been an apprentice to Cai—variously recorded by modern sources as Zuo Bo; Tso Po (左伯, courtesy name: Tzu-i: 子邑; Ziyi) from Donglai, Shandong; or Tso Tzǔ-yi—improved the process in 150 CE or later in the Han dynasty. Other than this, the basic principles of Cai's papermaking process have changed little over time, and the new form of paper spread throughout China. According to legend, the Buddhist monk Damjing brought the process to Japan, though this is unconfirmed. Damjing occupies a similar patron saint position in Japan that Cai does in China. By the 600s the process appeared in Turkestan, Korea, and India, (Note: Although India seems to have only begun widely producing paper in the 12th-century.) while Chinese prisoners from the Battle of Talas spread the knowledge to Arabs in the Abbasid Caliphate. Unlike many Chinese inventions that were created independently in Western Europe, the modern papermaking process was a wholly Chinese product and gradually spread via the Arabs to Europe, where it also saw widespread manufacturing by the 12th century. On 2 August 2010, the International Astronomical Union honored Cai's legacy by naming a crater on the Moon after him.

=== Influence in China ===
==== Folklore ====
While Cai's personal life is mostly unknown, a popular folktale suggests he was a shopkeeper and trickster with a wife and brother, though there is no historical confirmation for this. The story goes that after Cai's improvements to paper there was little demand for the product so he had an ever-growing surplus. As such, Cai and his wife developed a ploy to increase sales; they told townsfolk that paper becomes money in the afterlife when burned.

In the most popular variation to the tale, Cai Mo and Hui Niang—Cai's brother and sister-in-law of unconfirmed historicity—take the place of Cai and his wife. In this version, Hui convinced Cai Mo to learn the new papermaking trade from his younger brother, and when he returned in only three months, the paper he and his wife produced was too low quality to sell. To address this, Hui pretended to have died, and Cai Mo stood beside her coffin, wailing and burning money as tribute. Then, their neighbors checked in on them, and Hui sprung out of the coffin, explaining that the burned money was transferred to her in the afterlife, with which she paid ghosts to return her from the dead. Believing the story, the neighbors quickly purchased large amounts of paper for their own use. (Note: See Blake (2011, pp. 55–57) for a detailed account of the tale.) While mostly a fictitious story, intense wailing and burning offerings are commonplace in Chinese culture. (Note: See Blake (2011, pp. 57–63) for other variations on the story less related to Cai Lun.)

==== Deification and remembrance ====
Of those who originated China's Four Great Inventions of the ancient world—the compass, gunpowder, papermaking and printing—the only early figure known is one of papermaking, Cai Lun. Additionally, in comparison to other Chinese inventions such as the writing brush and ink, the development of paper is the best documented in literary sources.

After his death in 121 CE, a shrine with his grave was built in his hometown, but was soon neglected and damaged by floods while his name was largely forgotten. During the early Tang dynasty, many national heroes were deified, such as Li Bai and Guan Yu as the gods of wine and war respectively. Cai was among the important people declared gods, and was deified as the national god of papermaking. Cai also became a patron saint for papermakers, with his image often being painted or printed onto paper mills and paper shops in not only China, but also Japan. In 1267, a man named Chen Tsunghsi raised funds to repair the long-damaged shrine, and renovated it to include a statue of Cai and a mausoleum. Chen stated that "Tsai Lung's [Cai Lun's] extraordinary talent and his achievement are exemplary to all ages." A stone mortar, which legends claim Cai used to make paper, may have been brought to the mausoleum, although other sources say it was brought to the Imperial Museum in the capital of Lin'an. A great ceremony was held for the new mausoleum, though it fell into ruin again and was restored in 1955. Today, the temple still stands in Leiyang as the Cai Lun Temple near a pool, renamed the "Cai Lun Pool", that was thought to be near Cai's home. In the Song dynasty, Fei Chu (fl. 1265) said there was a temple in Chengdu where hundreds of families in the papermaking business would come to worship Cai.

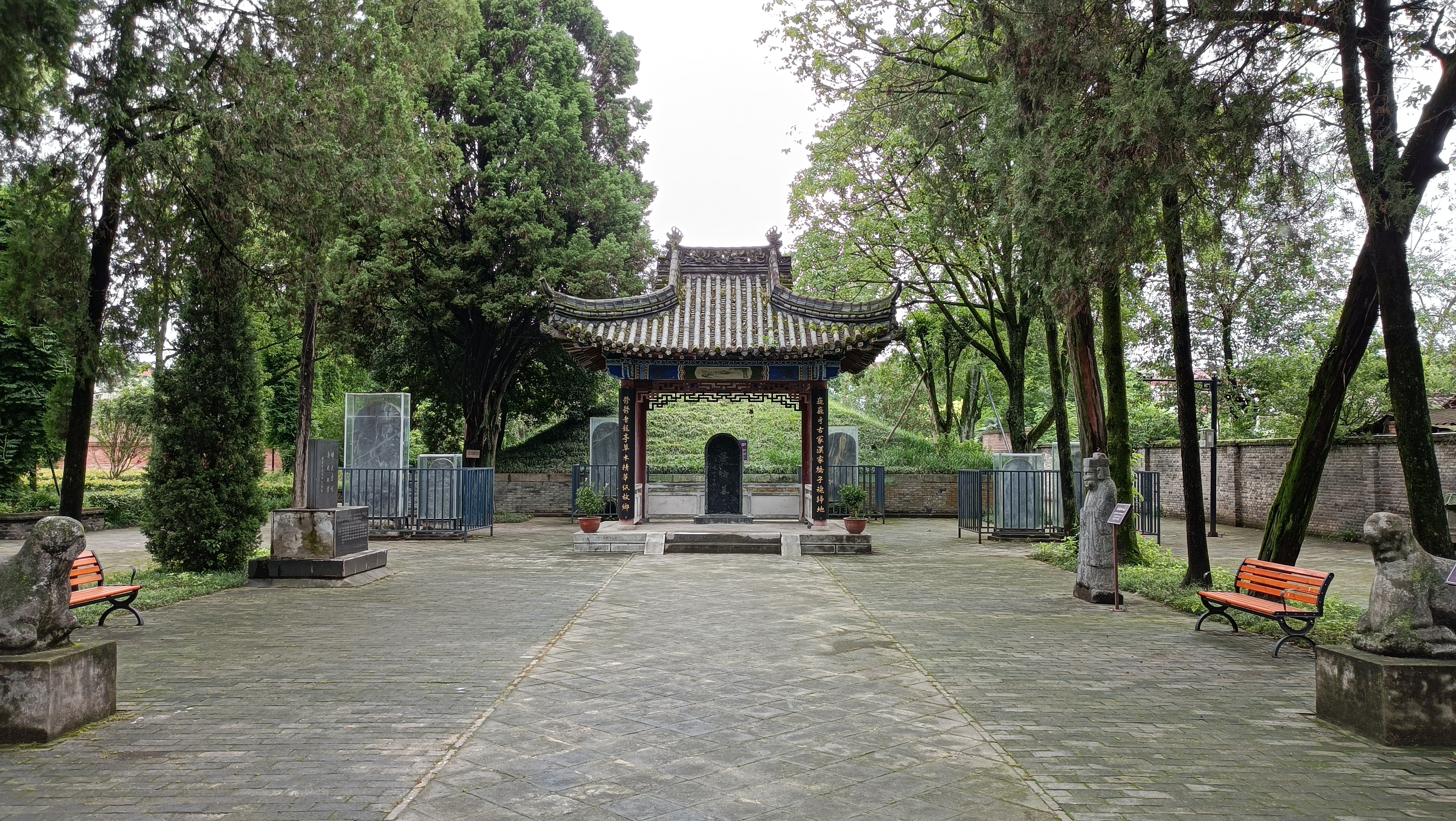
Cai Lun's traditional tomb, Longting, Hanzhong, Shaanxi Province.

During the late Qing dynasty, papermakers created religious groups, known as either "spirit-money associations" (shenfubang) or "Cai Lun associations" (Cai Lun hui). In 1839, the shenfubang from the town of Yingjiang was sued by shenfubangs in Macun and Zhongxing of Jiajiang County, Sichuan. The conflict began when the shenfubang of Yingjiang claimed that their statue of Cai—which they carried throughout Jiajiang County annually—gave them ritual supremacy over Macun and Zhongxing papermakers, whom they demanded pay for and take part in their celebrations. The shenfubangs from Macun and Zhongxing denied the demand, citing their long history of worshipping Cai, which resulted in increasing conflict between the sides and eventually a lawsuit. The county magistrate reproached both parties for descending into conflict and said: "Did they not understand that all of them owed their livelihood to Lord Cai, who had taught them the art of papermaking? Were they not all disciples of Lord Cai, who wanted them to share the benefits of the trade?"

In the 21st century, Leiyang is still famous as Cai's birthplace and has active paper production. His traditional tomb lays in the Cai Lun Paper Culture Museum of Longting, Hanzhong, Shaanxi Province. In modern-day China, Cai's name is closely associated with paper, and is the namesake of at least five roads: Cailun Road, Pudong, Shanghai; Cailun Road, Minhang District, Shanghai; Cailun Road, Fuyang District, Hangzhou, Zhejiang; Cailun Road East Crossing, Weiyang District, Xi'an; and Cailun Road, Yaohai District, Hefei, Anhui.
