= List of geological features on 951 Gaspra =

This is a list of named geological features on asteroid 951 Gaspra.

== Craters ==
Gaspran craters are named after famous spa towns.

Crater	Coordinates	Diameter (km)	Approval Date	Named After	Ref
Aix	47.9°N 160.3°W	0.6	1994	Aix-les-Bains, France	WGPSN
Alupka	65°N 65°W	0.3	1994	Alupka, Ukraine	WGPSN
Baden-Baden	46°N 55°W	0.3	1994	Baden-Baden, Germany	WGPSN
Badgastein	25°N 3°W	0.4	1994	Bad Gastein, Austria	WGPSN
Bagnoles	55°N 122°W	0.4	1994	Bagnoles, France	WGPSN
Bath	13.4°N 9.7°W	0.9	1994	Bath, UK	WGPSN
Beppu	3.9°N 58.4°W	0.6	1994	Beppu, Japan	WGPSN
Brookton	27.7°N 103.3°W	0.3	1994	Brookton, NY, United States	WGPSN
Calistoga	30°N 2°W	1.2	1994	Calistoga, CA, United States	WGPSN
Carlsbad	29.7°N 88.8°W	0.5	1994	Carlsbad, Czech Republic	WGPSN
Charax	8.6°N -0°E	0.9	1994	Charax, Ukraine	WGPSN
Helwan	22.4°N 118.9°W	0.4	1994	Helwan, Egypt	WGPSN
Ixtapan	11.9°N 86.9°W	0.7	1994	Ixtapan, Mexico	WGPSN
Katsiveli	55°N 65°W	0.3	1994	Katsiveli, Ukraine	WGPSN
Krynica	49°N 35°W	0.4	1994	Krynica, Poland	WGPSN
Lisdoonvarna	16.5°N 358.1°W	0.4	1994	Lisdoonvarna, Ireland	WGPSN
Loutraki	42°N 140°W	0.4	1994	Loutraki, Greece	WGPSN
Mandal	23.5°N 46.5°W	0.1	1994	Mandal, Norway	WGPSN
Manikaran	62°N 155°W	0.5	1994	Manikaran, India	WGPSN
Mariánské Lázně	35.4°N 81.8°W	0.6	1994	Mariánské Lázně, Czech Republic	WGPSN
Miskhor	15°N 65.9°W	0.5	1994	Miskhor, Ukraine	WGPSN
Moree	15.1°N 164.4°W	0.7	1994	Moree, Australia	WGPSN
Ramlösa	15°N 4.9°W	0.7	1994	Ramlösa, Sweden	WGPSN
Rio Hondo	31.7°N 20.7°W	0.6	1994	Rio Hondo, Argentina	WGPSN
Rotorua	18.8°N 30.7°W	0.5	1994	Rotorua, New Zealand	WGPSN
Saratoga	50°N 270°W	2.8	1994	Saratoga, NY, United States	WGPSN
Spa	51.5°N 152°W	1.6	1994	Spa, Belgium	WGPSN
Tang-Shan	59°N 256°W	2.1	1994	Tang-Shan, China	WGPSN
Yalova	29°N 10°W	0.4	1994	Yalova, Turkey	WGPSN
Yalta	57.6°N 261.3°W	1.4	1994	Yalta, Ukraine	WGPSN
Zohar	23°N 118°W	0.4	1994	Zohar, Israel	WGPSN

== Regiones ==
Gaspran regiones (geologically distinct areas) are named after astronomers and scientists closely associated with the asteroid.

See a labeled map here.

Regio	Coordinates	Diameter (km)	Approval Date	Named After	Ref
Dunne Regio	15°N 15°W	0	1994	James Dunne, Galileo Project manager	WGPSN
Neujmin Regio	2°N 80°W	0	1994	G. N. Neujmin, Russian astronomer who discovered Gaspra	WGPSN
Yeates Regio	65°N 75°W	0	1994	Clayne Yeates, Galileo Project manager	WGPSN
