= Guo Shuxian =

Guo Shuxian may refer to:

- Guo Zhongshu (died 977), painter and scholar during the Five Dynasties period and Song dynasty
- Ann Kok (born 1973), Singaporean actress
