= Damjing =

7th century Korean Buddhist priest

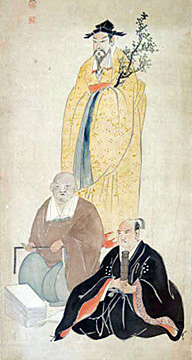
- The Three Gods of Paper-making, Cai Lun with Donchō (on the left) and Mochizuki Seibee (who brought the art to Nishijima (西嶋)) (Minobu Town Museum of History and Folklore)

Chinese name
- Traditional Chinese: 曇徵
Transcriptions
Standard Mandarin
- Hanyu Pinyin: Tánzhēng

Korean name
- Hangul: 담징
- Hanja: 曇徵
Transcriptions
- Revised Romanization: Damjing
- McCune–Reischauer: Tamjing

Japanese name
- Kanji: 曇徴
- Hiragana: どんちょう
Transcriptions
- Revised Hepburn: Donchō
- Kunrei-shiki: Dontyô

Damjing (Korean: 담징; Hanja: 曇徵), or Donchō (in Japanese), was a Korean Buddhist priest who was sent to ancient Japan from Goguryeo around 610. How his name was pronounced in the Goguryeo language is unknown.

Almost nothing has come down about him besides a few lines in the Nihon Shoki (720 A.D.), which is almost the only reliable source.

In the Spring, March, the 19th year [of Empress Suiko], the king of Koma offered up [the] priest[s] Donchō and Hōjō as tribute [to Japan]. Donchō was familiar with the Five Classics. He produced colors, paper and ink well, moreover made watermill. Has making watermill presumably started ever since?"

— Nihon Shoki, Vol. 22

On the grounds that this is the first appearance about the manufacture of paper, it has been said, all in all, from the Edo period, that he brought papermaking skills to Japan first. However, there is no sufficient grounds to say so from the text; as to the watermill, it is mentioned that he probably introduced it first, while papermaking is not mentioned. If he had done so, it should have been mentioned along with the mention of the watermill. B. Jugaku, in his study The Japanese Paper, making a comparative review of surviving ancient documents, concludes the text is a compliment for the Buddhist priest who was also familiar with Confucianism, what is more, never ignorant of crafts; and if properly read, it does not state that he was the first person to bring the methods for color, ink and papermaking, rather that he was quite a craftsman for producing them. Additionally, at that time, maintenance of the state apparatus, which required enormous amounts of paper such as for family registers, had been started. The facts of the time support such a reading.

Biography of Prince Shōtoku (written in 917 or maybe 992) tells that Prince Shōtoku invited him to Ikaruga-no-miya Palace, and afterward kept him at Hōryū-ji. However, it is not regarded as an historical fact since the book is a grand sum of mythical biographies about him.

In Korea, in recent years, some people have claimed that the wall painting in the Kondō of Hōryū-ji was made by Damjing, but this is not based on any surviving documents. Furthermore, the original temple was burned around 670 and the current one is a reconstruction from the late 7th century.

== See also ==
- Washi (Japanese paper)
- Wani
- Hyeja
