= Dunne Regio =

Regio on 951 Gaspra

- Feature type: Regio
- Location: 951 Gaspra
- Coordinates: 15.00°N 15.00°W
- Width: 5–7 km (3.1–4.3 mi)
- Naming: 1994
- Eponym: James A. Dunne, Galileo project

Dunne Regio is a regio on 951 Gaspra, an asteroid. The regio was named after Dr. James A. Dunne, an eponymous planner of the Galileo project. The name "Dunne Regio" was officially approved by the International Astronomical Union (IAU) in 1994.

== Geology and characteristics ==
The regio is located at 15.00°N 15.00°W and is very large, approximately 5–7 kilometres (3.1–4.3 mi) wide, within an accuracy of 200 metres (660 ft).
