= Thomas Francis Carter =

American scholar of paper (1882–1925)

Thomas Francis Carter, Jr. (October 26, 1882 – August 6, 1925) was an American scholar who wrote the first book-length history in the West on the Chinese origins of printing.

== Life and career ==
Carter's early life is not well documented. He was born in Boonton, New Jersey, the youngest of four children of Hettie Dodd and the Rev. Thomas Carter. His grandfather, Robert Carter, had founded a publishing house. He graduated from Princeton University in 1904, at the age of 22. Two years later, he embarked with three friends on a world tour, including a visit to China. In Nanjing, Carter left his companions in order to visit two cousins who were missionaries in Huaiyuan, Anhui province, making the over 200-kilometre (120 mi) journey on foot with a group of Chinese merchants. By the time he reached his destination he was smitten by China. He stayed for three months to begin learning the language. On his return to the United States, Carter continued to correspond in Chinese with his language teacher.

In 1910 Carter married, and returned to China as superintendent of a circuit of city and country schools. Straight away he began a study of Chinese history, using his knowledge of the language. His bride, Mrs. Dagny Carter, as she was henceforth known, accompanied him and later became a China scholar in her own right.

In 1921, while reading a book on a train to Shandong, where he was travelling to assist with famine relief, Carter came across a passage about the four great Chinese inventions of the compass, gunpowder, paper and printing, which seized his imagination. The next year Thomas and Dagny travelled to Europe. In Munich Thomas met with Dr. Friedrich Hirth, a former head of the Department of Chinese at Columbia University. Carter, looking to turn the history of Chinese inventions into a research topic, consulted Hirth, who pointed out that the invention of printing in China and its spread westward had been little studied in the West but was well documented in Chinese sources. Carter readily took up the suggestion and spent the winter and spring of 1922–3 in Berlin researching archeological material brought from Chinese Turkestan by Albert von Le Coq.

From Berlin, Carter's researches led him to Paris, where he introduced himself to Paul Pelliot of the École française d'Extrême-Orient, the archeologist and sinologist who had collected hundreds of rare manuscripts from the Mogao Caves near Dunhuang in Chinese Turkestan. Pelliot took an immediate interest in the subject, bringing from his desk drawer a box full of movable type in Chinese characters, hundreds of years older than Gutenberg's, which he had found on a cave floor. Pelliot proved of great help to Carter as his researches advanced, and Carter dedicated his book to Pelliot when it finally appeared.

Carter was awarded a PhD from Columbia University, and in 1924 was invited to join their Chinese faculty, finally becoming head of department. In 1925 Carter fell ill in New York City, and died just as his book emerged from the press. The Invention of Printing in China and its Spread Westwards, has been acknowledged as a classic. A new edition appeared in 1931, and a revised edition undertaken by his successor at Columbia, Dr. Carrington Goodrich, appeared in 1955. While much of its content has by now been overtaken by subsequent research and archeological discoveries, Carter's book was a ground-breaking contribution to the subject and even now much (such as his chapter on paper) remains relevant. Carter also contributed a chapter on the spread of printing from China to the West in Arthur Waley's 1924–5 Year book.

In 1930 his wife Dagny Carter remarried, to the architect Henry Killam Murphy. She remained dedicated to the memory of her first husband and was instrumental in the publication of the revised edition of his book in 1955. Almost all biographical information in this article is drawn from Dagny Carter's memoir of him in the preface to this edition.
