= Cai Lun (crater) =

Crater on the Moon

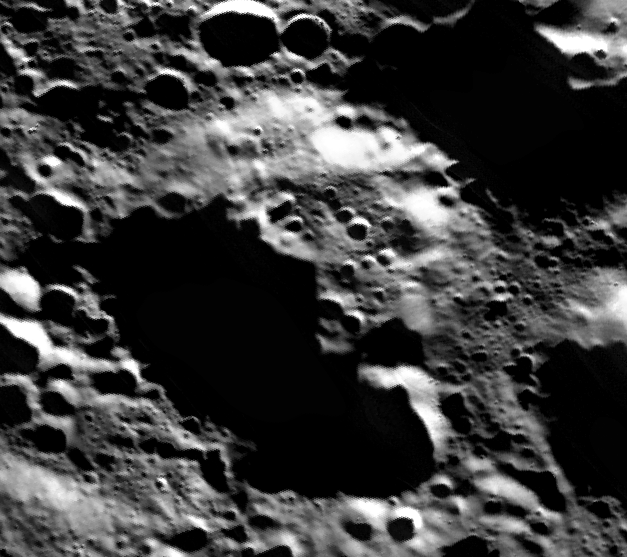
- LROC image of Cai Lun
- Coordinates: 80.12°N 113.66°E
- Diameter: 44.89 km (27.89 mi)
- Eponym: Cai Lun

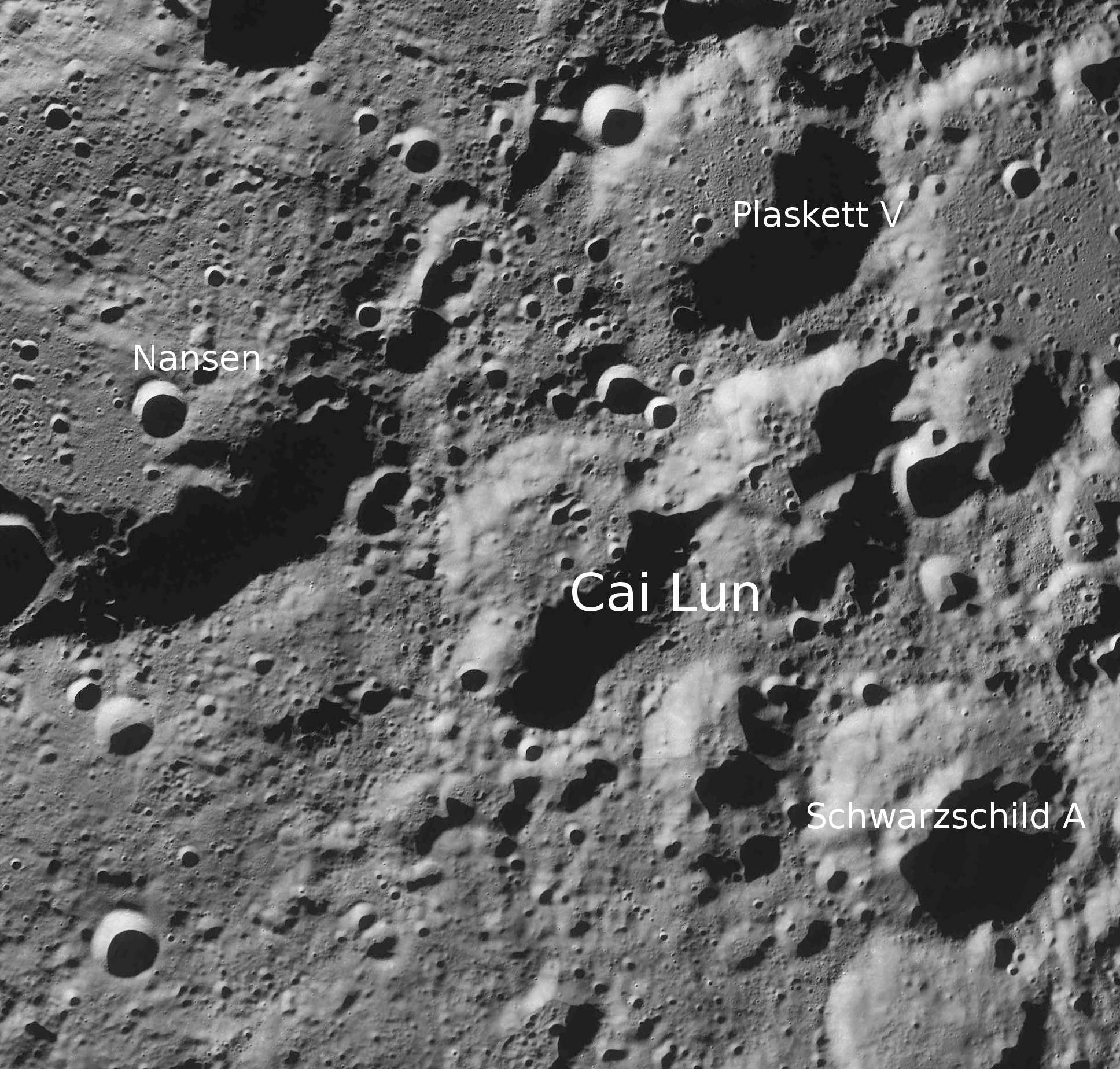
Cai Lun and neighboring features

Cai Lun is a lunar impact crater located on the lunar far side near the northern pole. The crater is located in between the prominent craters Haskin and Nansen. Cai Lun was adopted and named after Chinese inventor Cai Lun by the International Astronomical Union on August 2, 2010.
