= Guo Zhongshu =

Chinese calligrapher, painter, philologist, and scholar

Guo Zhongshu 郭忠恕
- Born: c. 929; Luoyang, Later Tang
- Died: 977; Linyi, Qi Prefecture, Song
- Known for: Landscape paintings; Palaeography
- Style: Jiehua

Chinese name
- Chinese: 郭忠恕
Transcriptions
Standard Mandarin
- Hanyu Pinyin: Guō Zhōngshù
- Wade–Giles: Kuo^{1} Chung^{1}-shu^{4}

Guo Shuxian
- Chinese: 郭恕先
Transcriptions
Standard Mandarin
- Hanyu Pinyin: Guō Shùxiān
- Wade–Giles: Kuo^{1} Shu^{4}-hsien^{1}

Guo Guobao
- Traditional Chinese: 郭國寶
- Simplified Chinese: 郭国宝
Transcriptions
Standard Mandarin
- Hanyu Pinyin: Guō Guóbǎo
- Wade–Giles: Kuo^{1} Kuo^{2}-pao^{3}

Guo Zhongshu (c. 929 – 977), courtesy name Shuxian (or Guobao, according to Xuanhe Huapu), was a Chinese calligrapher, painter, philologist, and scholar during the Five Dynasties period and Song dynasty. He was noted for his paintings of landscapes and structures.

Early in his career, Guo Zhongshu served under the Later Han governor Liu Yun until Liu was murdered by the usurper Guo Wei. He later served in the Later Zhou and Song imperial governments, but was banished multiple times for behavioral problems. Especially in his later life, he was known for his eccentricity. Su Shi's eulogy as well as later anecdotes celebrated his apparent free spirit, wit, courage, and egalitarian tendencies. Alexander Soper, however, saw symptoms of schizophrenia which he blamed for Guo's death.

== Early life ==
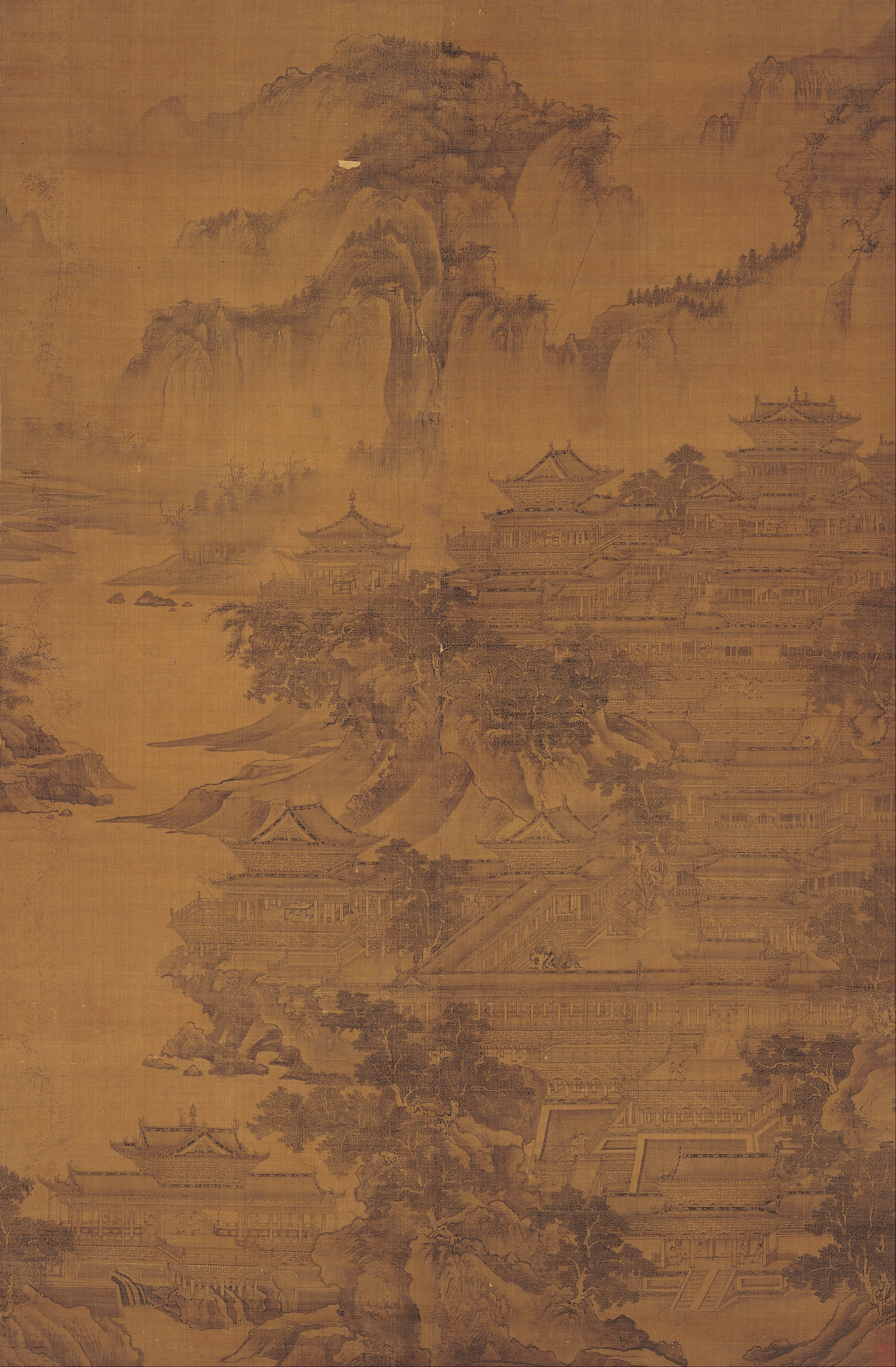
Summer Palace of Emperor Ming Huang (明皇避暑宮), collection of Osaka City Museum of Fine Arts.

Guo Zhongshu was from Luoyang, while his ancestral home was in Shanghe County. A child prodigy, at the age of 6 he could already recite Confucian classics and compose essays, and that year he passed the Later Tang dynasty's national children's examination (童子科). (The exam was for children under 15 who could recite Classics and compose poetry in both the shi and fu forms, recommended by the prefect and personally tested by the emperor.) He was also good at calligraphy, especially the seal script and the large seal script. Once, when shown a manuscript in the rare bird seal script, he was so absorbed by it that he read and copied it overnight.

During the Later Han dynasty, Liu Yun—a cousin of the Later Han emperor Liu Chengyou—was named the military governor of Wuning Circuit (武寧, headquartered in Xu Prefecture) in 948. Guo Zhongshu, who was around 19 at that time, went to Xu Prefecture and served as a prefectural judge (推官) under him.

In late 950, military governor Guo Wei rebelled and quickly captured the capital Daliang (also known as Kaifeng). Emperor Liu Chengyou was killed on 2 January 951. With Guo Wei's ostensible consent, the widowed Empress Dowager Li (Liu Chengyou's mother) chose Liu Yun to succeed the throne. On 4 January, senior official Feng Dao was sent with her edict to Xu Prefecture to escort Liu Yun back to the capital. After Feng Dao's arrival, Liu Yun took most of his retinue (including Guo Zhongshu) and set out for Daliang—but he wouldn't make it, because Guo Wei having consolidated enough power in Daliang was no longer satisfied with remaining a mere subject. On 30 January, supported by thousands of his soldiers who made a (likely orchestrated) commotion, Guo Wei agreed to ascend the throne, and immediately, General Guo Chongwei was sent with 700 cavalries to intercept Liu Yun, who had by then arrived in Song Prefecture. When Guo Chongwei came to Song Prefecture, he first met with Feng Dao outside the city gate before venturing inside to meet with Liu Yun. Realizing this is a conspiracy, the 22-year-old Guo Zhongshu angrily lambasted the 69-year-old Feng Dao, who had disloyally held high positions under the Later Tang, Later Jin, and the Liao dynasty before Later Han:

Sir, you have been an important minister during many dynasties. Your honesty and integrity is renowned in the world. Even those who lack virtues respect you as an elderly gentleman. If you go back on your word and betray the Han dynasty today, you will be throwing away all you have accomplished in your life. How can you not have any qualms?

Feng Dao was too ashamed to respond. Guo Zhongshu and others then advised Liu Yun to immediately kill Feng Dao, gather the troops in Song Prefecture and flee to Hedong Circuit where Liu Yun's father Liu Chong was stationed as the military governor. Liu Yun hesitated (because Guo Chongwei said Guo Wei had nothing but good intentions), but by the next morning everything was already too late—Guo Chongwei had secretly taken control of his guards the night before and put him under house arrest. Guo Zhongshu fled to the "mountains and wilderness", and in less than a month Guo Wei founded the Later Zhou dynasty and had Liu Yun murdered.

(Su Shi's eulogy (included in his Dongpo Ji 東坡集) offers a different account. It states that Guo Zhongshu resigned from his post before 950, following a quarrel with Dong Yi (董裔), a staff supervisor (判官).)

== Later Zhou and Song dynasties ==
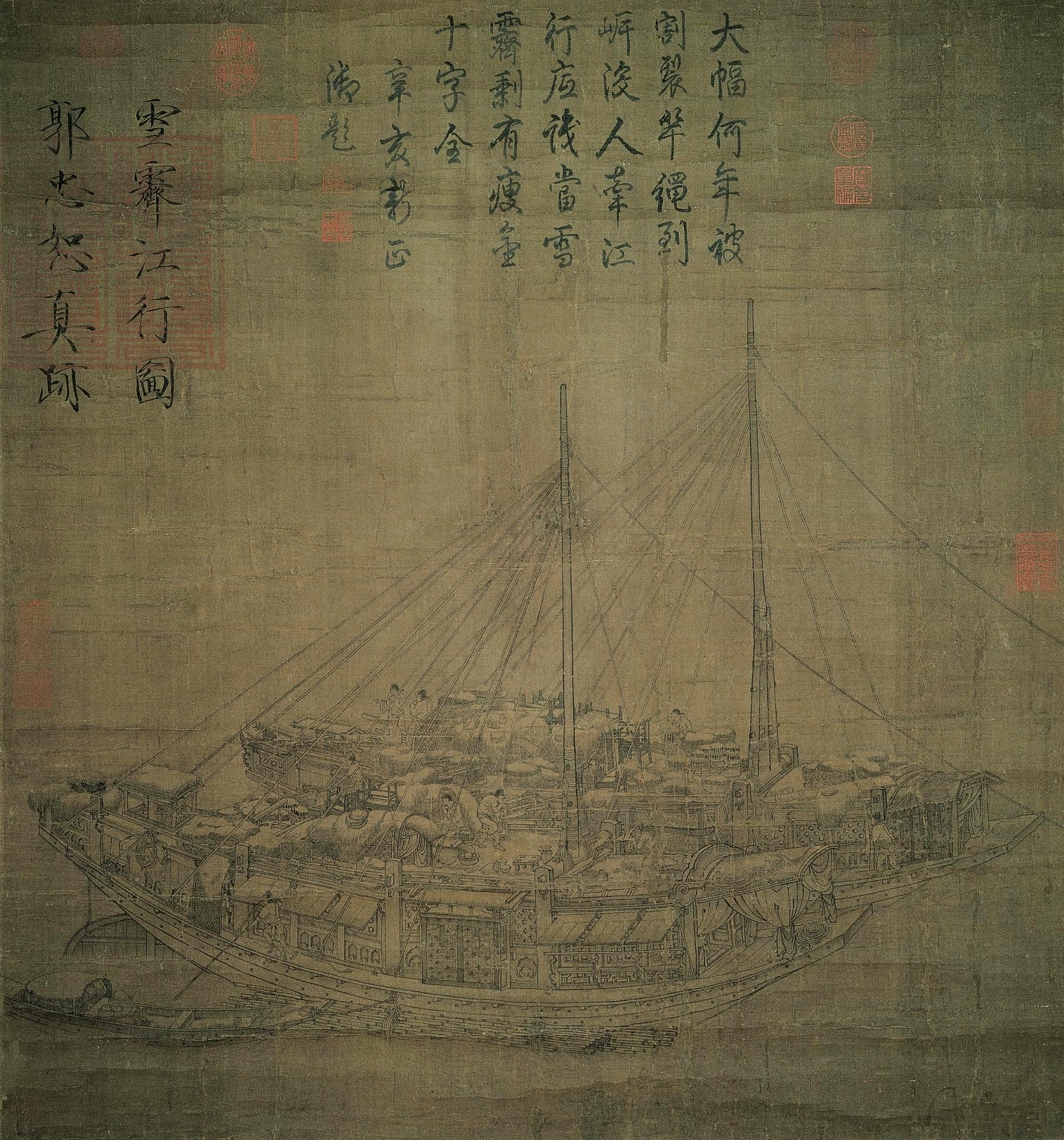
Traveling on the River in Snow (雪霽江行), latter half of 10th century, collection of National Palace Museum.

Guo Zhongshu re-emerged in officialdom when Guo Wei was still emperor. He likely denied his former relationship with Liu Yun, because official records claimed he "swung his sleeve and spurned" Liu Yun when the latter offered him a position. At any rate, around 952, he had concurrent positions in the Imperial Clan Court and the Directorate of Education (where he was the I Ching specialist).

The Later Zhou dynasty was replaced by the Song dynasty in 960, but Guo Zhongshu kept his positions. One day in 961, Guo Zhongshu came to the imperial court very drunk and argued loudly with Fu Zhaowen (符昭文), a Secretariat of the Heir Apparent (太子中舍). When a censor (御史) tried to submit a memorial criticizing them, Guo Zhongshu yelled at the censor, grabbed his memorial and destroyed it. Due to these unruly behaviors, on 10 October 961, he was banished to Qian Prefecture to serve as a revenue administrator (司戶參軍), but he did not mend his ways there. After he drunkenly beat up a local clerk named Fan Di (范滌) and failed to report for duty, he was arrested and further banished to Lingwu.

Thereafter Guo Zhongshu became a drifting artist, wandering between Qi Prefecture, Yong Prefecture, the capital Kaifeng and his hometown Luoyang, often appearing drunk and untoward. If he chanced upon a beautiful mountain or body of water during his travels, he would linger for weeks even without any food. People thought he was odd: he could be seen standing under the scorching sun during the summer, and swimming in rivers floating with ice during the winter. He mingled with both the rich and the poor and treated everyone the same. Once during a trip, he got off his horse and invited his servant to drink with him in a roadside teahouse. The servant naturally declined because it was socially unacceptable, but Guo Zhongshu said:

I'm often received by dukes, lords, and scholar-officials. Everyone is a son and thus the same, why the fuss?

It was during this time that he became very famous for his paintings. The aristocrats and royalty whose homes he frequented often had to entice him with good wine, and a white scroll would be prepared beforehand on the wall: if he was in the mood he would finish a painting, but requesting one would result in him leaving in a huff. Thus his paintings became even more treasured. The 17th-century writer Feng Menglong included a funny story in his Anecdotes Old and New (古今談概). When Guo Zhongshu was in Qi Prefecture, a young man from a rich family was into arts and craved a painting from him, so he treated Guo Zhongshu very well with a daily supply of booze. After many days he finally told Guo Zhongshu of his desire and provided a long hanging scroll. Guo Zhongshu just drew a small child flying a kite, with the kite string taking up several feet of the scroll space. The young man was so enraged that he broke off with Guo Zhongshu.

Zhao Guangyi became the emperor in 976, and being a connoisseur he summoned Guo Zhongshu back to the imperial court and provided him with sumptuous gifts such as silver belts. Ending his 15-year exile, Guo Zhongshu returned to the Directorate of Education to assume the position of master of records (主簿). Initially the emperor had him stay with a eunuch named Dou Shenxing (竇神興). Guo Zhongshu had a long lush beard, but suddenly he shaved it all off. Dou Shenxing was puzzled and asked him. Guo Zhongshu replied, "Don't mind me, I'm just awkwardly imitating." The eunuch (undoubtedly beardless) was so infuriated he complained to the emperor. Because cutting off one's body hair was contrary to Confucian social norms, Guo Zhongshu was removed from the Directorate of Education and assigned to the Taixue to review historical manuscripts. In the following months he again violated many rules and conventions, and the emperor had to pardon him again and again on account of his unique talent.

Whenever he had too much to drink Guo Zhongshu could never control his tongue, and his slanderous remarks soon reached the ears of others. Guo Zhongshu also had a habit of selling his official accessories. Since these behaviors were punishable by death, when he was reported the emperor could only reduce his death sentence to an exile to Deng Prefecture with a round of clubbing. The year was 977, and he died when he got to Linyi in Qi Prefecture. He reportedly said "I will die today!" and stooped down to dig his grave with his hands, and when the hole got to the size of his face he collapsed and died. The escorting guards had to bury him hurriedly on the side of the main road, and it was several months later when his family dug out his remains for a reburial.

== Han Jian ==
Guo Zhongshu authored at least 6 titles, all of them in the fields of palaeography and lexicography. Only one work is extant, the palaeographic compilation Han Jian (汗簡), which, among other materials, features the inscriptions of the Stone Drums of Qin. The name of the dictionary means "making the bamboo sweet" and refers to the process of preparation of the bamboo slips for writing (so called shaqing, 殺青, "killing the green" ). Despite being included into the bibliographic chapter of the History of Song, this work was much neglected during the following dynasties. Veracity of some interpretations in the Han Jian was not proven until the second half of the 20th century.

== Gallery ==
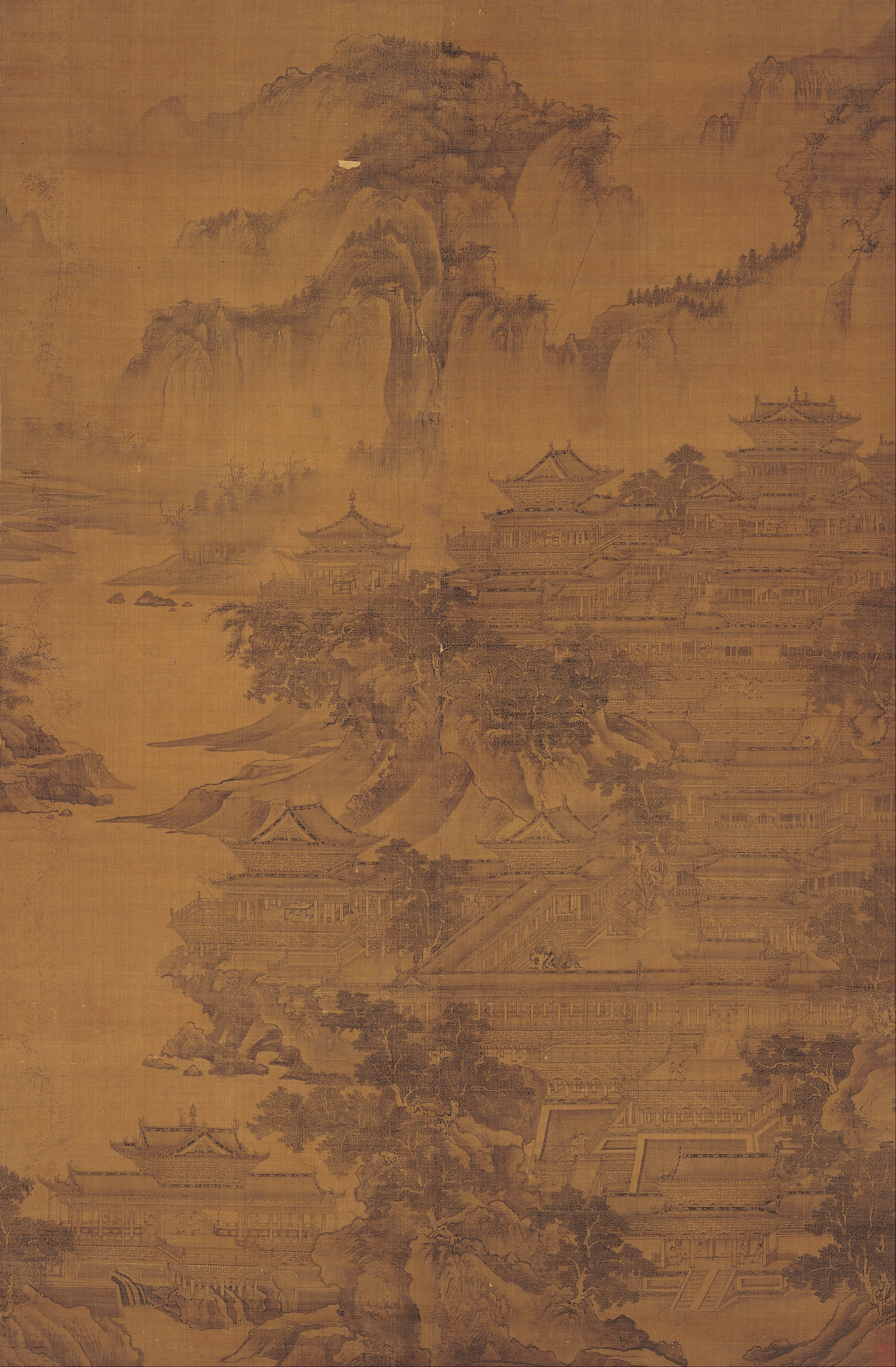
Summer Palace of Emperor Ming

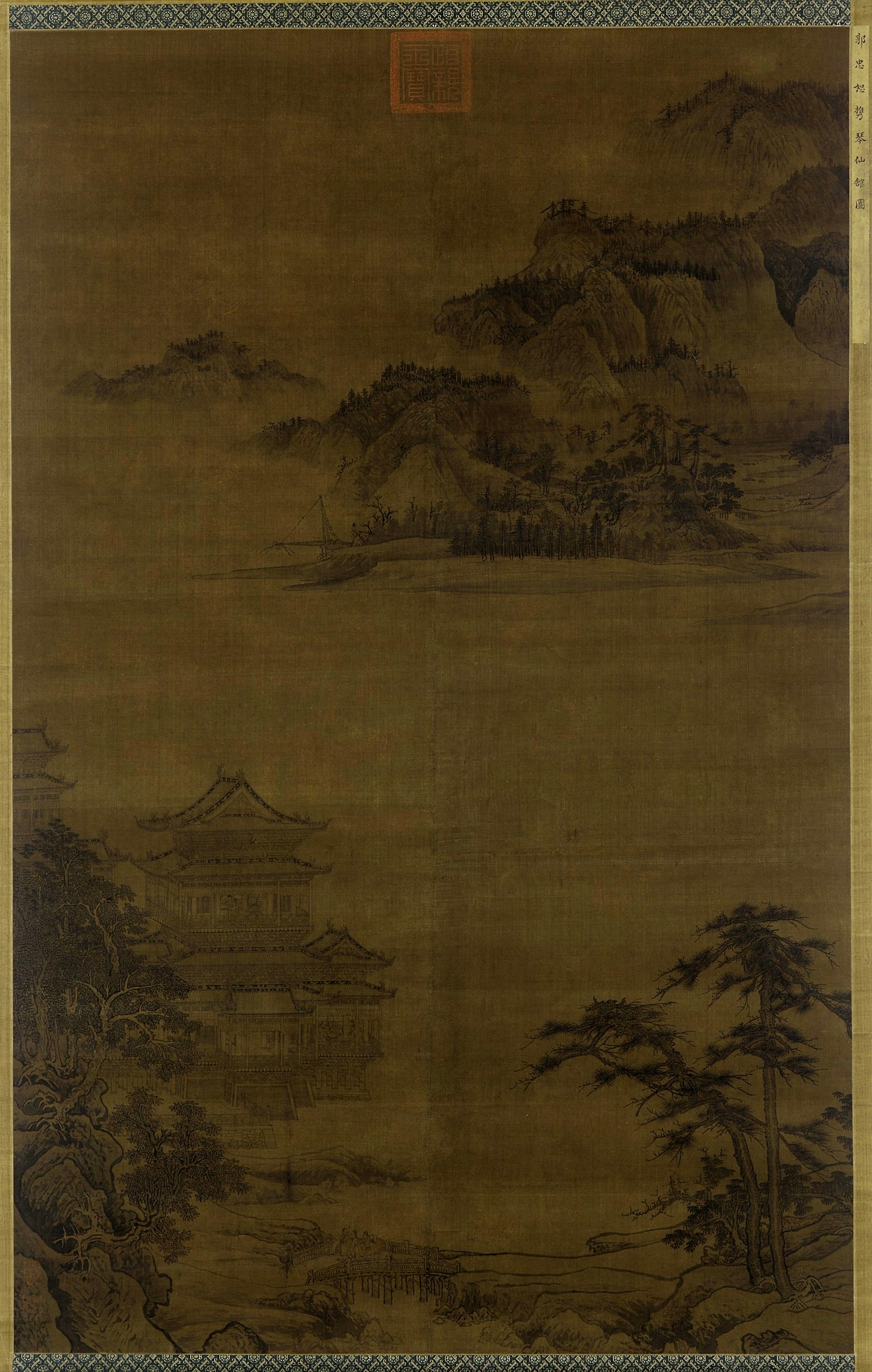
Bringing a Lute to an Immortal's Pavilion

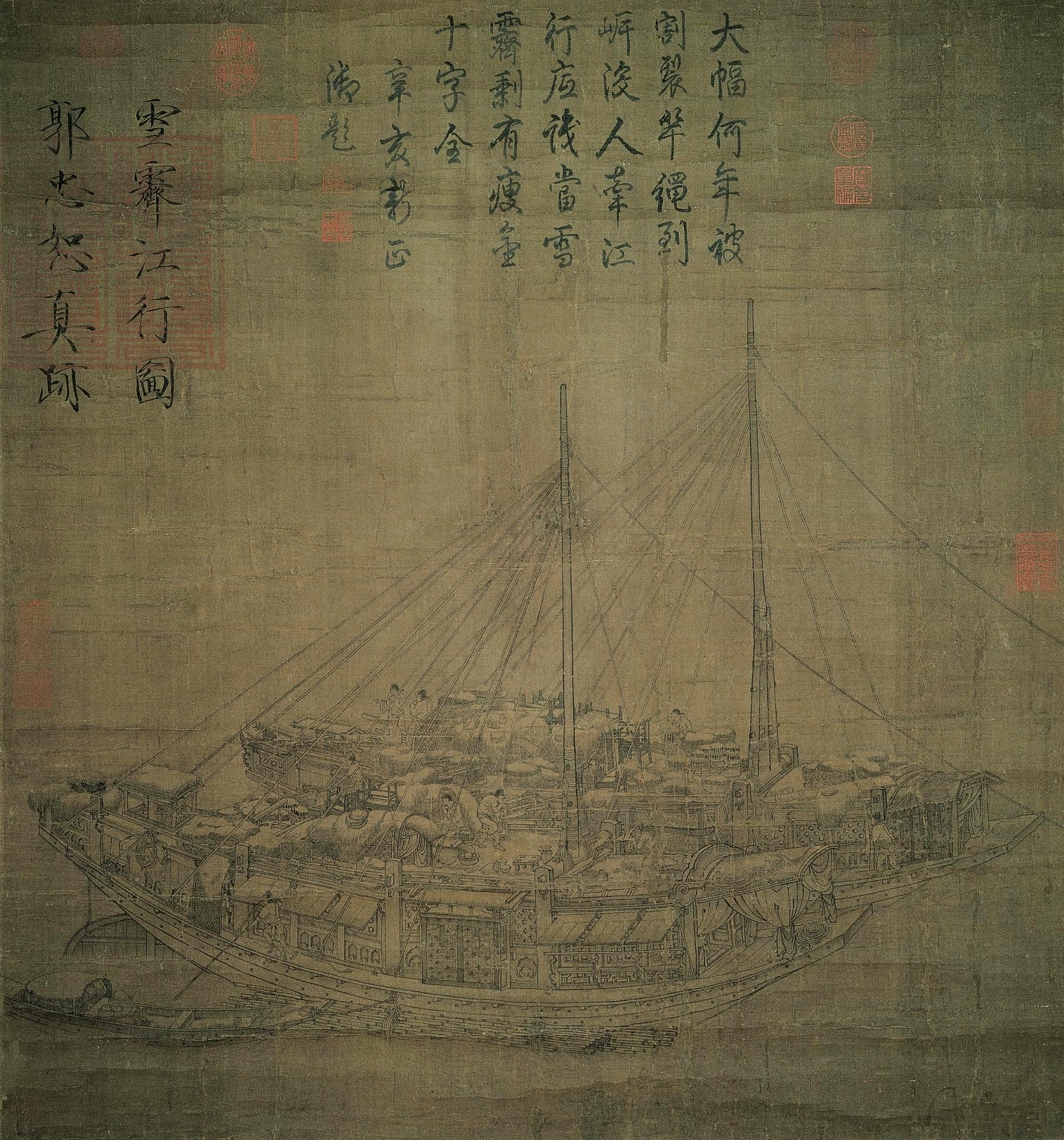
Traveling on the River in Snow

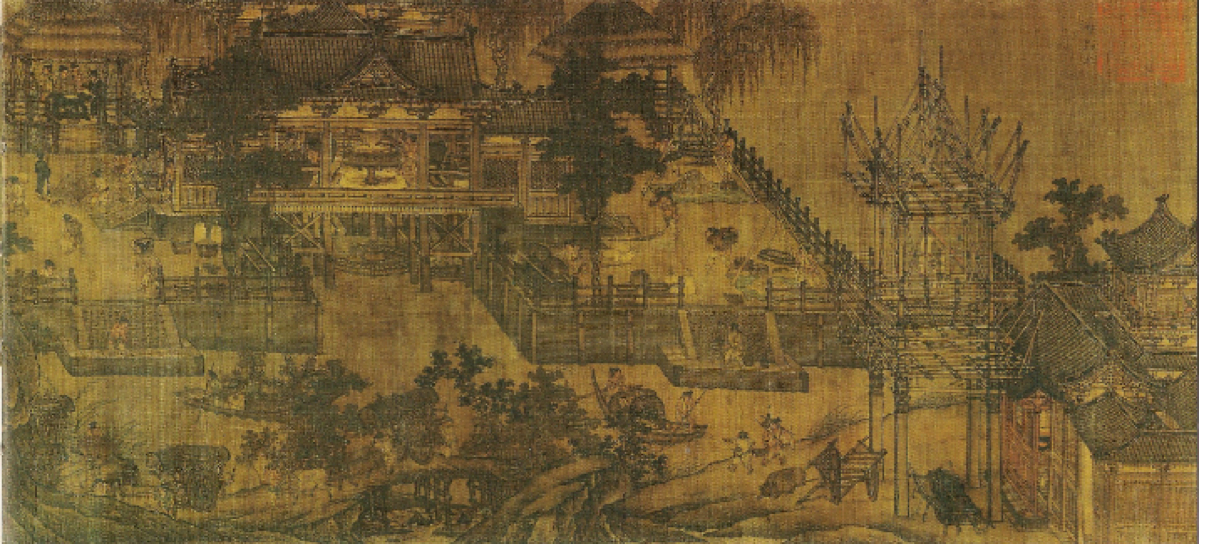
Riverside grain mill

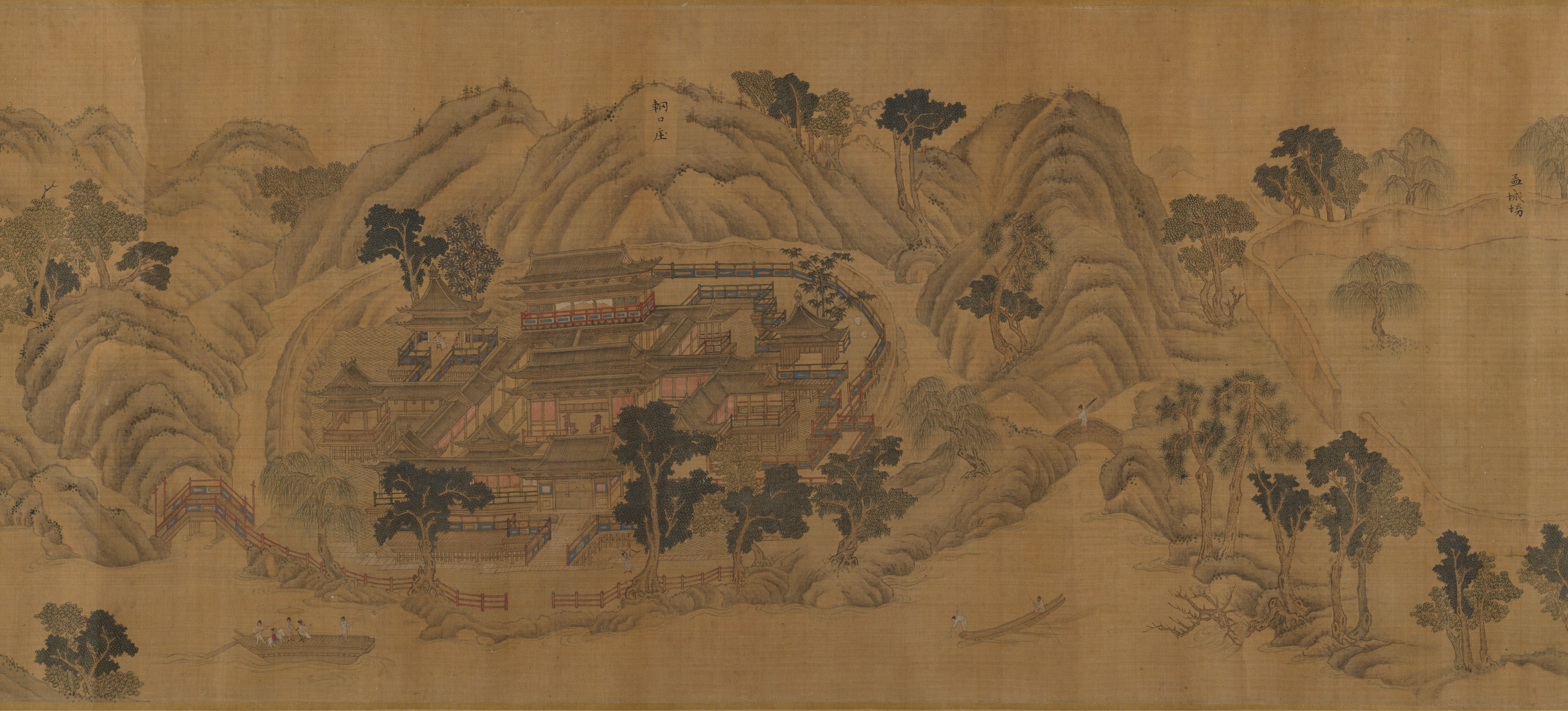
Wangchuan villa

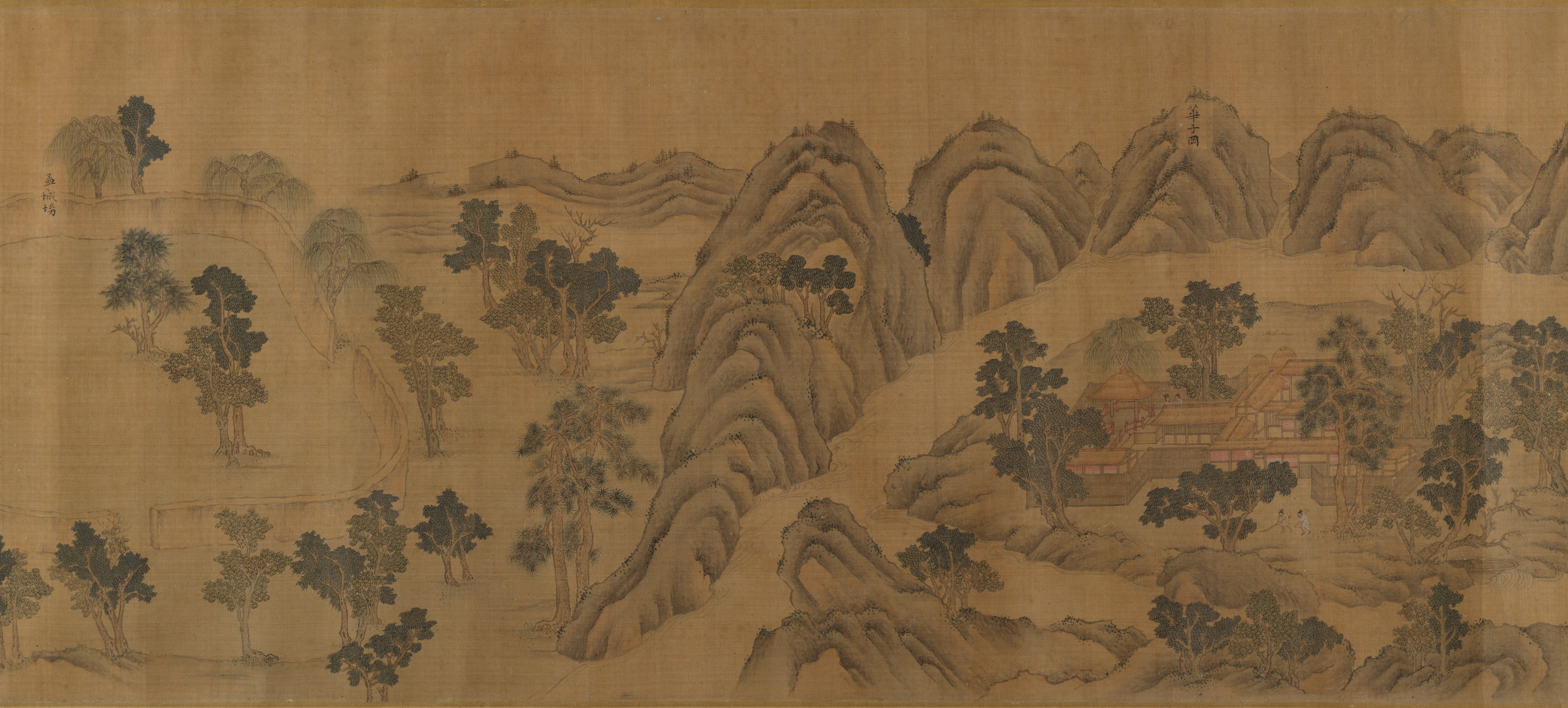
Wangchuan villa

== See also ==
- Wangchuan ji

== Citations ==
- Shih, Hsio-yen (1976). "Kuo Chung-shu". In Franke, Herbert (ed.). Sung Biographies: Painters. Franz Steiner Verlag. pp. 69–76. ISBN 3-515-02547-2.
- Soper, Alexander C. (1949). "A Northern Sung Descriptive Catalogue of Paintings (The Hua P'in of Li Ch'ih)". Journal of the American Oriental Society. 69 (1): 18–33. doi:10.2307/595395. JSTOR 595395.
- Li Tao (1183). Xu Zizhi Tongjian Changbian (續資治通鑑長編) [Extended Continuation to Zizhi Tongjian] (in Chinese).
- Ouyang Xiu (1073). Wudai Shiji (五代史記) [Historical Records of the Five Dynasties] (in Chinese).
- Sima Guang (1086). Zizhi Tongjian (資治通鑑) [Comprehensive Mirror for Aid in Government] (in Chinese).
- Toqto'a; et al., eds. (1345). Song Shi (宋史) [History of Song] (in Chinese).
- Wu Renchen (1669). Shiguo Chunqiu (十國春秋) [Springs and Autumns of the Ten States] (in Chinese).
