= HD 173416 b =

Exoplanet in the constellation Lyra

HD 173416 b / Wangshu
Discovery
- Discovered by: Liu et al.
- Discovery date: January 10, 2009
- Detection method: radial velocity

Designations
- Alternative names: Wangshu

Orbital characteristics
- Apastron: 1.399 AU (209.3×10^{6} km)
- Periastron: 0.917 AU (137.2×10^{6} km)
- Semi-major axis: 1.158+0.003 −0.004 AU
- Eccentricity: 0.208+0.089 −0.094
- Orbital period (sidereal): 322.03+1.33 −1.52 d
- Time of periastron: 2454735.0+23.4 −253.1 JD
- Argument of periastron: −117.9°+33.7° −33.1°
- Semi-amplitude: 35.33+4.07 −4.46 m/s
- Star: HD 173416

Physical characteristics
- Mass: ≥1.841+0.206 −0.225 M_{J}

HD 173416 b, also named Wangshu, is an extrasolar planet located approximately 433 light-years away in the constellation of Lyra, orbiting the 6th magnitude G-type giant star HD 173416. This planet is at least 2.7 times the mass of Jupiter and was discovered on January 10, 2009 by Liu et al. HD 173416 b orbits at 1.16 AU from the star. However, despite the fact that the planet orbits 16% further from the star than Earth does from the Sun, it has an orbital period of only 323.6 days, compared to 365.25 days for Earth. This inverse relationship is caused by the parent star having twice the mass of the Sun, which increases the strength of its gravitational field. This evidence implies that when this star was on the main sequence, it was an A-type star.

The planet HD 173416 b is named Wangshu (望舒). The name was selected in the 2019 NameExoWorlds campaign by China, during the 100th anniversary of the IAU. Wangshu is the goddess who drives for the Moon and also represents the Moon in Chinese mythology.
