= Four Great Inventions =

Canonical landmark inventions in China

- Five major steps in papermaking, outlined by Cai Lun in AD 104
- Traditional Chinese: 四大發明
- Simplified Chinese: 四大发明
- Literal meaning: four great inventions
Transcriptions
Standard Mandarin
- Hanyu Pinyin: sì dà fā míng
- Wade–Giles: ssu^{4} ta^{4} fa^{1} ming^{2}
Yue: Cantonese
- Yale Romanization: sei^{3} daai^{6} faat^{3} ming^{4}
- Jyutping: sei^{3} daai^{6} faat^{3} ming^{4}

The Four Great Inventions are inventions from imperial China that are celebrated in Chinese culture for their historical significance and as symbols of ancient China's advanced science and technology. They are the compass, gunpowder, papermaking and printing.

These four inventions had a profound impact on the development of civilization throughout the world. However, some modern Chinese scholars have opined that other Chinese inventions were perhaps more sophisticated and had a greater impact on Chinese civilization – the Four Great Inventions serve merely to highlight the technological interaction between East and West.

== Evolution ==
The appreciation of "The Three Great Inventions" was first proposed by the British philosopher Francis Bacon, and later taken up by Walter Henry Medhurst and other scholars.

Printing, gunpowder, and the common compass were brought to Europe by Arab traders during the Renaissance and Reformation. Bacon, a leading philosopher, politician, and adviser to King James I of England, wrote:

It is well to observe the force and virtue and consequence of discoveries. These are to be seen nowhere more clearly than those three which were unknown to the ancients [the Greeks], and of which the origin, though recent, is obscure and inglorious; namely printing, gunpowder, and the magnet. For these three have changed the whole face and stage of things throughout the world, the first in literature, the second in warfare, the third in navigation; whence have followed innumerable changes; insomuch that no empire, no sect, no star, seems to have exerted greater power and influence in human affairs than these three mechanical discoveries.

Karl Marx wrote:

Gunpowder, compass, and printing—these are the three major inventions that foretell the arrival of bourgeois society. Gunpowder blasted the knight class to pieces, the compass opened the world market and established colonies, and printing became almost unavoidable. In general, it has become a means of scientific renaissance, and has become the most powerful lever to create the necessary preconditions for spiritual development.

British Sinologist Medhurst pointed out:

The Chinese people's genius for inventions has manifested in many aspects very early. The three Chinese inventions (navigation compass, printing, gunpowder) have provided an extraordinary impetus to the development of European civilization.

=== Papermaking ===
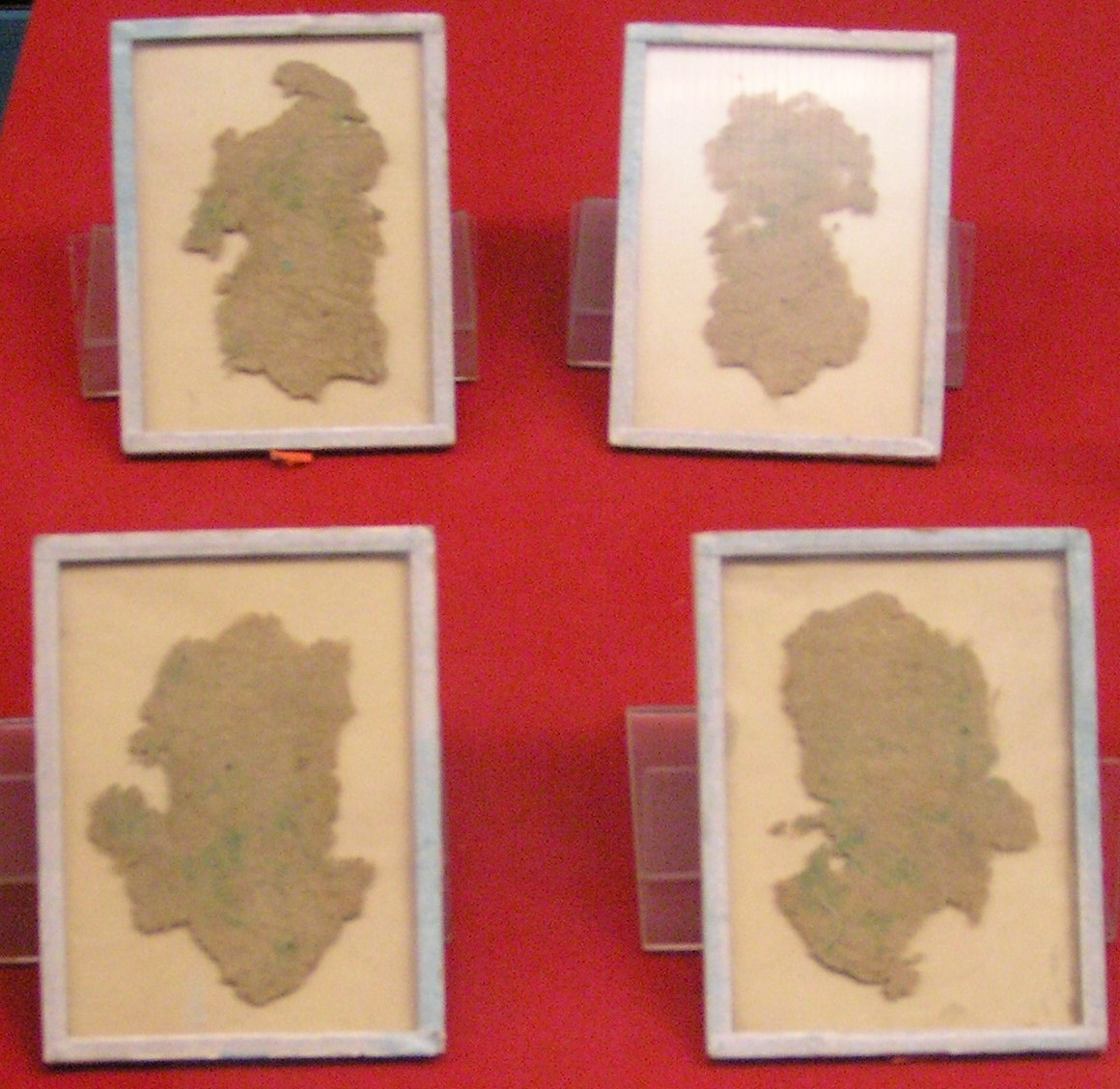
Hemp wrapping paper, China, circa 100 BC

Papermaking has traditionally been traced to China about AD 105, when Cai Lun, an official attached to the imperial court during the Han dynasty (202 BC – AD 220), created a sheet of paper using mulberry and other bast fibres along with fishing net, old rags, and hemp waste.

While paper used for wrapping and padding was used in China since the 2nd century BC, paper used as a writing medium only became widespread by the 3rd century. However, a recent archaeological discovery has been reported from Gansu of paper with Chinese characters on it dating to 8 BC. Before paper was invented, the ancient Chinese carved characters on pottery, animal bones and stones, cast them on bronzes, or wrote them on bamboo or wooden strips and silk fabric. These materials, however, were either too heavy or too expensive for widespread use. The invention and use of paper brought about a revolution in writing materials.

By the 6th century in China, sheets of paper were beginning to be used for toilet paper as well. During the Tang dynasty (618–907) paper was folded and sewn into square bags to preserve the flavor of tea. The Song dynasty (960–1279) that followed was the first government to issue paper currency.

=== Compass ===
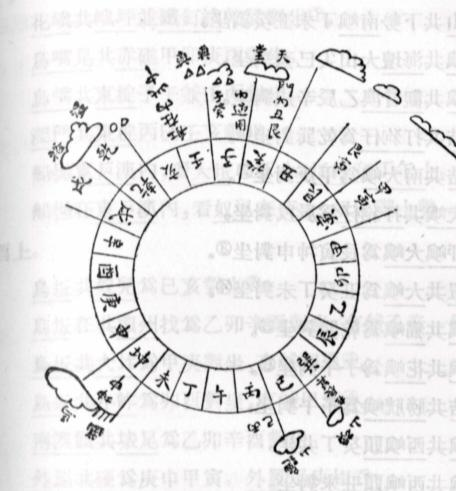
Diagram of a Ming dynasty mariner's compass

A compass is a direction-indicating tool which is widely used in navigation and land exploration. From ancient times, its use facilitated travel and had a profound influence on trade, war, cultural exchange.

Before the discovery of the compass, travellers on open ocean or in unfamiliar terrain attempted to tell directions by interpreting the positions of the sun, moon, and pole stars. This was impossible during overcast weather, making travel difficult.

The compass's origins may be traced back to the Warring States period (476–221 BC), which used a lodestone compass called the "south-governor" (sīnán 司南). The earliest reference to a magnetic navigation device is from a Song dynasty book of 1040–1044, describing an iron "south-pointing fish" floating in a bowl of water. The device is recommended as a means of orientation "in the obscurity of the night." The first suspended magnetic needle compass was mentioned by Shen Kuo in 1088.

By the early Song dynasty, steady development resulted in a spherical compass with a small needle of magnetic steel which aligns itself to point south. During the Northern Song dynasty (960–1127), the compass was brought to the Arab world and Europe.

According to Needham, the Chinese in the Song dynasty and following Yuan dynasty made use of a dry compass. Instead of a floating needle, it used a suspended wooden frame in the shape of a turtle, containing a lodestone sealed in wax: when rotated, the tail would rotate to point north. The 14th-century European compass-card, with box frame and dry pivot needle, was in the 16th century adopted in China via Japanese pirates; nevertheless, use of the Chinese suspended dry compass persisted well into the 18th century.

=== Gunpowder ===
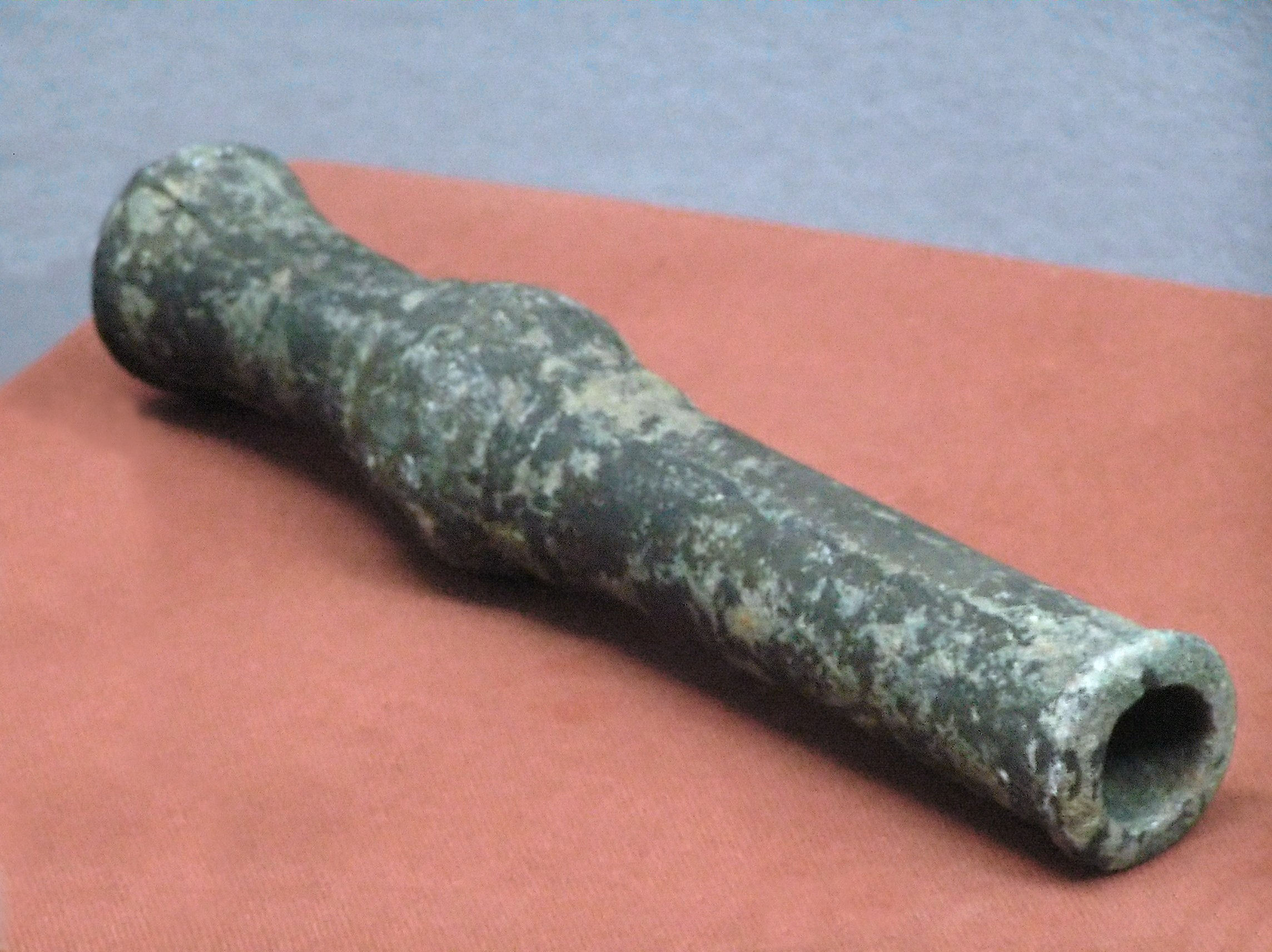
Hand cannon from the Yuan dynasty, circa 1300s (decade)

Originally, gunpowder was used to make fireworks for festivals and major events. It was later utilized as an explosive substance in cannons, fire-arrows, and other military weapons. During the Song and Yuan dynasties (960–1368), gunpowder was in high demand due to numerous battles and the development of mass industry.

Gunpowder was invented in the 9th century by Chinese alchemists searching for an elixir of immortality. By the time the Song dynasty treatise, Wujing Zongyao (武经总要), was written by Zeng Gongliang and Yang Weide in 1044, the various Chinese formulas for gunpowder held levels of nitrate in the range of 27% to 50%. By the end of the 12th century, Chinese formulas of gunpowder had a level of nitrate capable of bursting through cast iron metal containers, in the form of the earliest hollow, gunpowder-filled grenade bombs.

In 1280, the bomb store of the large gunpowder arsenal at Weiyang accidentally caught fire, which produced such a large explosion that a team of inspectors at the site a week later deduced that 100 guards had been killed instantly, with wooden beams and pillars blown sky high and landing at a distance of over 10 li (~2 mi or ~3 km) away from the explosion.

By the time of Jiao Yu and his Huolongjing (which describes military applications of gunpowder in great detail) in the mid-14th century, the explosive potential of gunpowder was perfected, as the level of nitrate in gunpowder formulas had risen to a range of 12% to 91%, with at least six different formulas in use that are considered to have maximum explosive potential for gunpowder. By that time, the Chinese had invented how to create explosive round shot by packing their hollow shells with this nitrate-enhanced gunpowder. An excavated trove of early Ming land mines showed that corned gunpowder was present in China by 1370. There is evidence suggesting that corned powder may have been used in East Asia as early as the thirteenth century.

=== Printing ===
During the Tang dynasty, printing was created in China (AD 618–906). The first mention of printing is in an AD 593 imperial decree by the Sui Emperor Wen-ti, who mandates the printing of Buddhist pictures and scriptures.

==== Woodblock printing ====
Woodblock printing, a predecessor of all printing technology is one of the Four Great Inventions. It remained a typical mode of printing in China for over a thousand years.

Blocks made from wood were used in the oldest type of Chinese printing. Printing textiles and reproducing Buddhist scriptures were also done using these blocks. Short religious writings were carried as charms in this manner.

The Chinese invention of woodblock printing, at some point before the first dated book in 868 (the Diamond Sutra), produced the world's first print culture. According to A. Hyatt Mayor, curator at the Metropolitan Museum of Art, "it was the Chinese who really invented the means of communication that was to dominate until our age." Woodblock printing was better suited to Chinese characters than movable type, which the Chinese also invented, but which did not replace woodblock printing. Western printing presses, although introduced in the 16th century, were not widely used in China until the 19th century. China, along with Korea, was one of the last countries to adopt them.

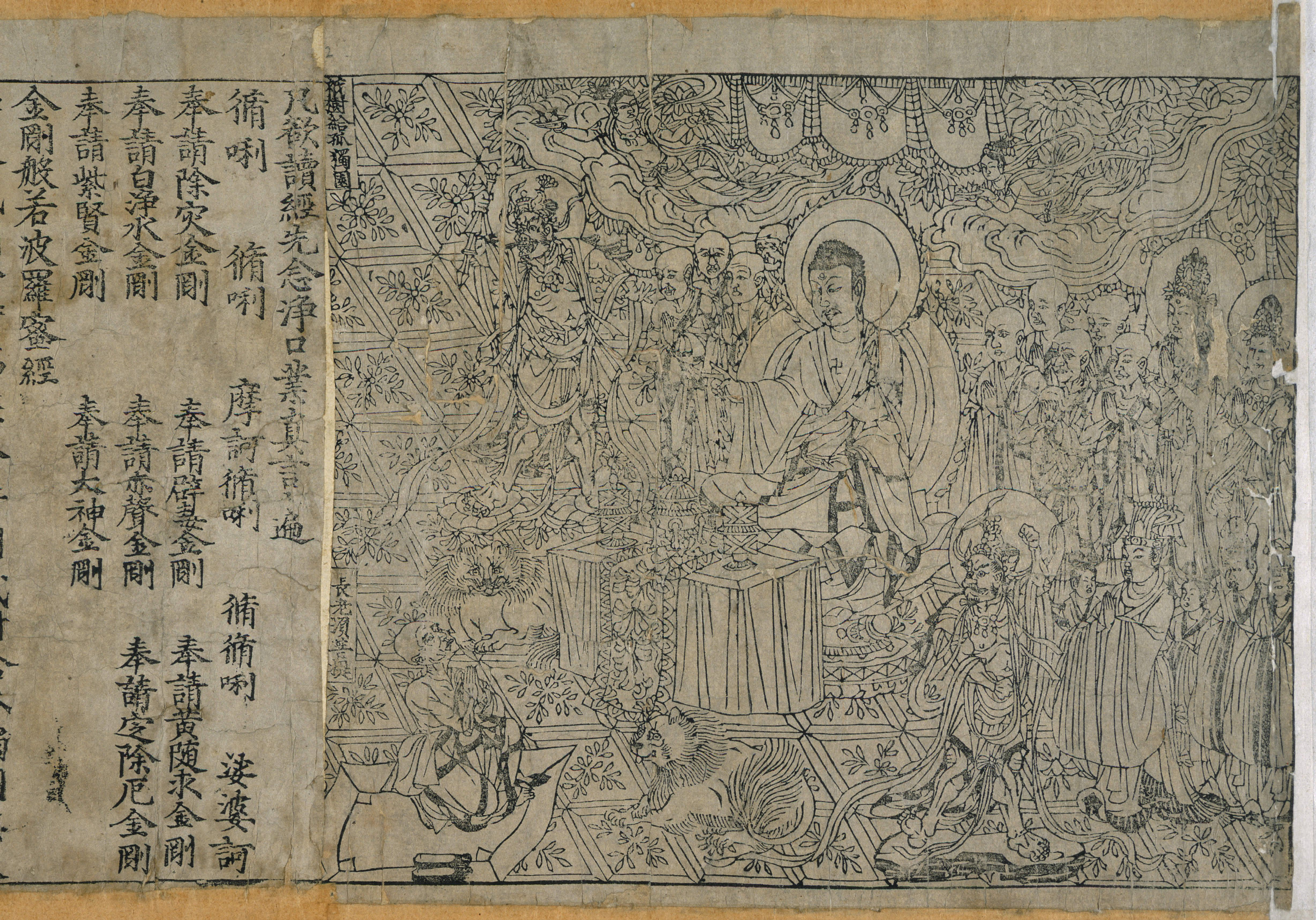
The intricate frontispiece of the Diamond Sutra from Tang dynasty China, 868 (British Museum)

Woodblock printing for textiles, on the other hand, preceded text printing by centuries in all cultures, and is first found in China at around 220. It reached Europe by the 14th century or before, via the Islamic world, and by around 1400 was being used on paper for old master prints and playing cards.

==== Moveable type printing ====
Printing in Northern China was further advanced by the 11th century, as it was written by the Song dynasty scientist and statesman Shen Kuo (1031–1095) that the common artisan Bi Sheng (990–1051) invented ceramic movable type printing. Then there were those such as Wang Zhen (fl. 1290–1333) who invented respectively wooden type setting, which later influenced developing metal moveable type printing in Korea (1372–1377). Movable type printing was a tedious process if one were to assemble thousands of individual characters for the printing of simply one or a few books, but if used for printing thousands of books, the process was efficient and rapid enough to be successful and highly employed. Indeed, there were many cities in China where movable type printing, in wooden and metal form, was adopted by the enterprises of wealthy local families or large private industries. The Qing dynasty court sponsored enormous printing projects using woodblock movable type printing during the 18th century. Although superseded by western printing techniques, woodblock movable type printing remains in use in isolated communities in China.

== Analysis ==
Although Chinese culture is replete with lists of significant works or achievements (e.g. Four Great Beauties, Four Great Classical Novels, Four Books and Five Classics, etc.), the concept of the Four Great Inventions originated from the West, and is adapted from the European intellectual and rhetorical commonplace of the Three Great (or, more properly, Greatest) Inventions. This commonplace spread rapidly throughout Europe in the 16th century and was appropriated only in modern times by sinologists and Chinese scholars. The origin of the Three Great Inventions—these being the printing press, firearms, and the nautical compass—was originally ascribed to Europe, and specifically to Germany in the case of the printing press and firearms. These inventions were a badge of honor to modern Europeans, who proclaimed that there was nothing to equal them among the ancient Greeks and Romans. After reports by Portuguese sailors and Spanish missionaries began to filter back to Europe beginning in the 1530s, the notion that these inventions had existed for centuries in China took hold. By 1620, when Francis Bacon wrote in his Instauratio magna that "printing, gunpowder, and the nautical compass... have altered the face and state of the world: first, in literary matters; second, in warfare; third, in navigation," this was hardly an original idea to most learned Europeans.

Western writers and scholars from the 19th century onwards commonly attributed these inventions to China. The missionary and sinologist Joseph Edkins (1823–1905), comparing China with Japan, noted that for all of Japan's virtues, it did not make inventions as significant as paper-making, printing, the compass and gunpowder. Other examples include, in Johnson's New Universal Cyclopædia: A Scientific and Popular Treasury of Useful Knowledge in 1880, The Chautauquan in 1887, and by the sinologist, Berthold Laufer in 1915. None of these, however, referred to four inventions or called them "great."

In the 20th century, this list was popularized and augmented by the noted British biochemist, historian, and sinologist Joseph Needham, who devoted the later part of his life to studying the science and civilization of ancient China.

Recently, scholars have questioned the importance placed on the inventions of paper, printing, gunpowder, and the compass. Chinese scholars in particular question if too much emphasis is given to these inventions, over other significant Chinese inventions. They have pointed out that other inventions in China were perhaps more sophisticated and had a greater impact within China.

In the chapter "Are the Four Major Inventions the Most Important?" of his book Ancient Chinese Inventions, Chinese historian Deng Yinke writes:

The four inventions do not necessarily summarize the achievements of science and technology in ancient China. The four inventions were regarded as the most important Chinese achievements in science and technology, simply because they had a prominent position in the exchanges between the East and the West and acted as a powerful dynamic in the development of capitalism in Europe. As a matter of fact, ancient Chinese scored much more than the four major inventions: in farming, iron and copper metallurgy, exploitation of coal and petroleum, machinery, medicine, astronomy, mathematics, porcelain, silk, and wine making. The numerous inventions and discoveries greatly advanced China's productive forces and social life. Many are at least as important as the four inventions, and some are even greater than the four.

In his political discourse, General Secretary of the Chinese Communist Party Xi Jinping often cites the Four Great Inventions as a source of national pride for China and its historic contributions to humanity.

In 2017, the term "four great new inventions" became popularized in China in reference to high-speed rail, mobile payment, e-commerce, and bike-sharing. The term is not intended strictly, as although these innovations have been exceptionally developed in China, none were invented within China. Arguably, all were first realized on a societal scale in China.

== Cultural influence ==
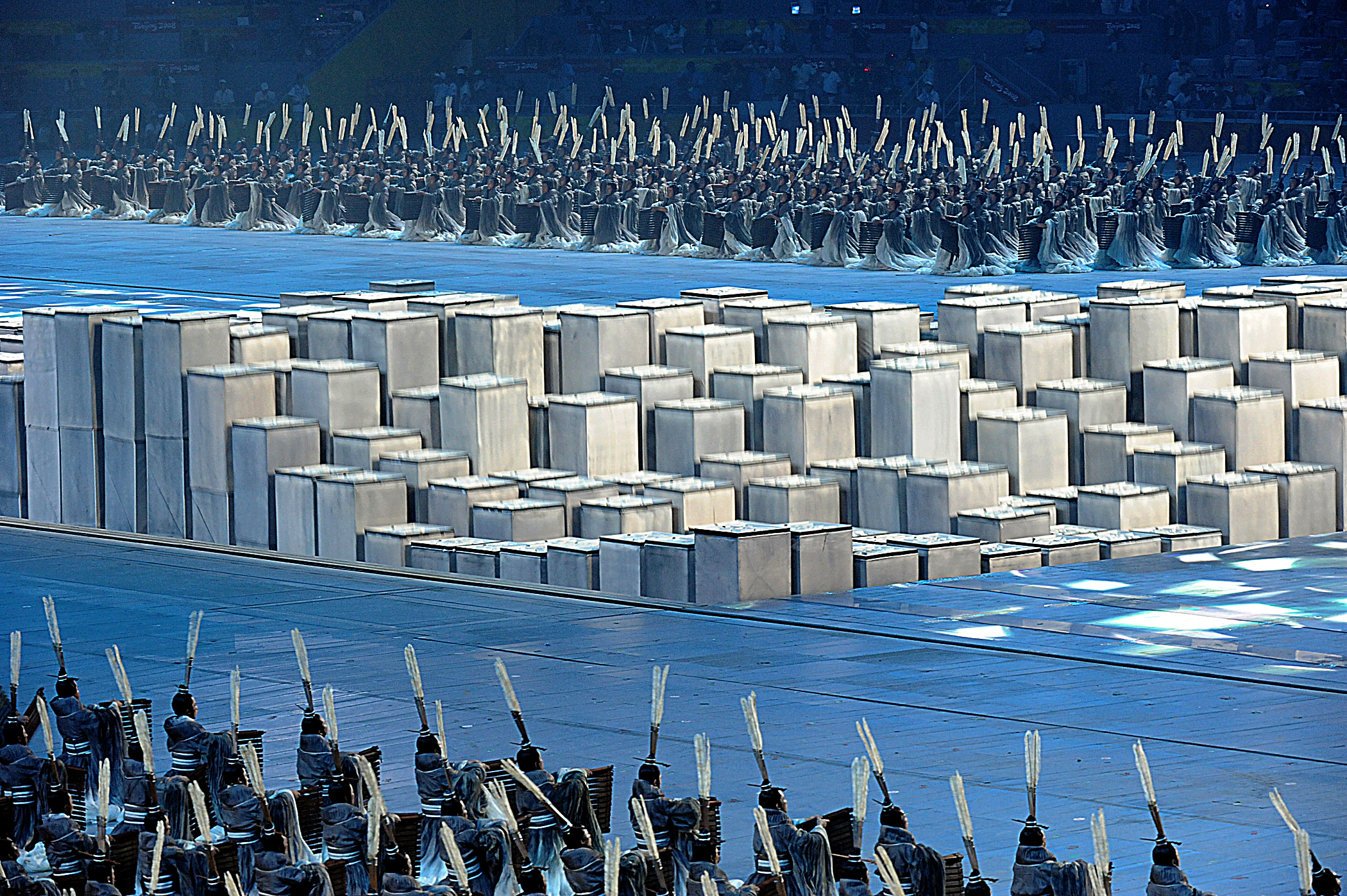
Dancing boxes representing movable-type printing blocks at the 2008 Summer Olympics opening ceremony

The Four Great Inventions are emphasized in Chinese schooling and are a point of national pride.

In 2005, the Hong Kong postal service created a special stamp issue that featured the Four Great Inventions. The stamp series was first issued on August 18, 2005, during a ceremony where an enlarged first day cover was stamped. Allan Chiang (Postmaster General) and Prof. Chu Ching-wu (president of the Hong Kong University of Science and Technology) marked the issue of the special stamps by personally stamping the first day cover.

The Four Great Inventions was featured as one of the main themes of the opening ceremony of the 2008 Beijing Summer Olympics. Paper making was represented with a dance and an ink drawing on a huge piece of paper, printing by a set of dancing printing blocks, a replica of an ancient compass was showcased, and gunpowder by the extensive firework displays during the ceremony. A survey by the Beijing Social Facts & Public Opinion Survey Center found that Beijing residents found the program on the Four Great Inventions the most moving part of the opening ceremony.

In 2009, UNESCO recognized Chinese woodblock printing as an Intangible Cultural Heritage of Humanity.

== See also ==
- Dream Pool Essays
- History of science and technology in China
- List of Chinese inventions
- Science and technology of the Han dynasty
- Technology of the Song dynasty
