= Nansen (lunar crater) =

Crater on the Moon

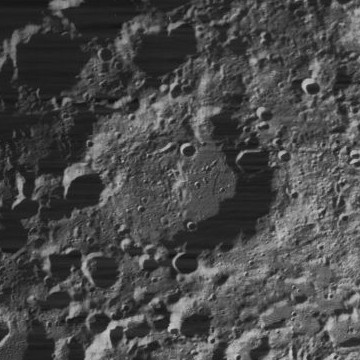
- Lunar Orbiter 4 image, facing east
- Coordinates: 80.9°N 95.3°E
- Diameter: 104 km
- Depth: Unknown
- Colongitude: 275° at sunrise
- Eponym: Fridtjof Nansen

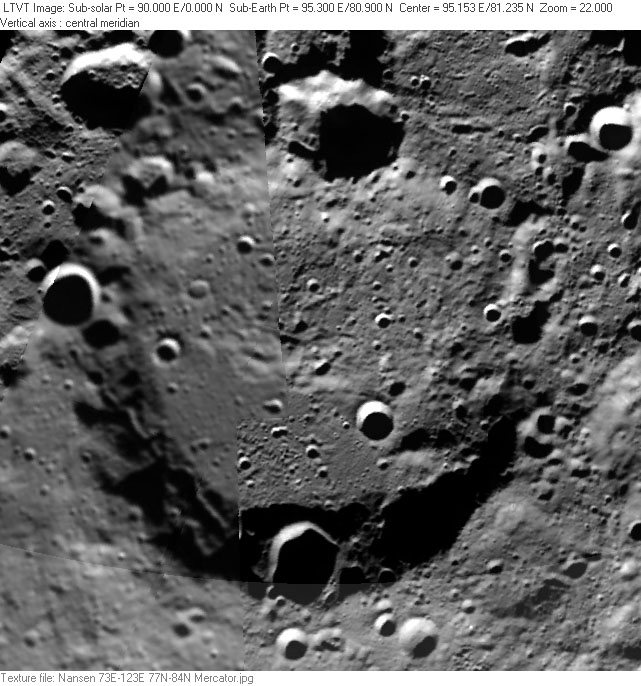
Clementine mosaic

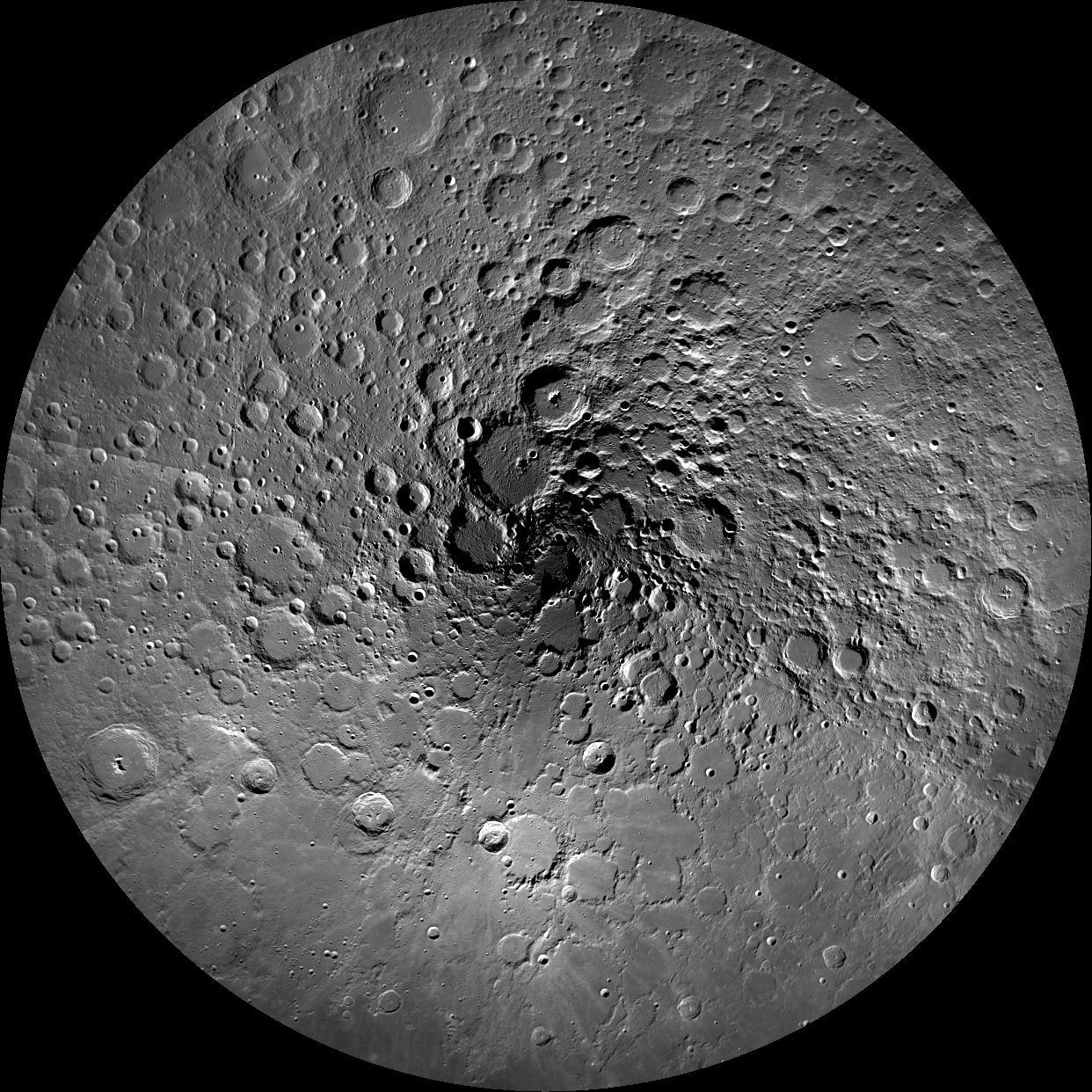
Location of Nansen as seen from above the lunar north pole

Nansen is an old lunar impact crater along the northern limb of the Moon, on the eastern side of the north pole. This feature is viewed from the edge from the Earth, and it must be observed from orbit to see much detail. When brought into view during a favorable libration, this formation can be located by finding the crater Baillaud, then following the surface up towards the limb.

This formation dates to the Nectarian epoch of the lunar geologic timescale. It has been heavily worn and eroded by minor impacts, leaving an irregular outer wall that is marked by multiple small craters and indentations. The small crater Houssay lies across the northern rim of Nansen, which includes a permanently shadowed region that spans 116.15 km^{2}. A similar formation is located along the inner southern wall. A merged chain of tiny craters lies across the eastern rim.

The interior floor of Nansen is more hummocky and irregular in the northern half, while the southern part of the floor is relatively level. There is a small, bowl-shaped crater in the southeastern part of the floor, and many tiny craterlets lie across the interior and along the inner walls.

This crater is named after Norwegian arctic explorer Fridtjof Nansen (1861–1930).

== Satellite craters ==
By convention these features are identified on lunar maps by placing the letter on the side of the crater midpoint that is closest to Nansen.

Nansen	Latitude	Longitude	Diameter
A	82.8° N	63.0° E	46 km
C	83.2° N	55.5° E	34 km
D	83.8° N	64.0° E	21 km
E	83.3° N	71.0° E	15 km
F	84.7° N	60.0° E	62 km
U	81.6° N	81.4° E	16 km
