= HD 173416 =

Star in the constellation Lyra

HD 173416 / Xihe
- Location of HD 173416 (circled in red)

Observation data Epoch J2000 Equinox ICRS
- Constellation: Lyra
- Right ascension: 18^{h} 43^{m} 36.109^{s}
- Declination: +36° 33′ 23.78″
- Apparent magnitude (V): 6.04

Characteristics
- Evolutionary stage: Giant
- Spectral type: G8 III
- Apparent magnitude (B): 7.080
- Apparent magnitude (J): 4.580±0.264
- Apparent magnitude (H): 3.929±0.232
- Apparent magnitude (K): 3.814±0.354
- B−V color index: 1.040±0.006

Astrometry
Radial velocity (R_{v})	−61.38±0.13 km/s
Proper motion (μ)	RA: 20.946 mas/yr Dec.: 58.198 mas/yr
Parallax (π)	7.5363±0.0238 mas
Distance	433 ± 1 ly (132.7 ± 0.4 pc)
Absolute magnitude (M_{V})	0.406

Details
Mass	1.8±0.2 M_{☉}
Radius	13.0±0.3 R_{☉}
Luminosity	79±2 L_{☉}
Surface gravity (log g)	2.5±0.1 cgs
Temperature	4,790±37 K
Metallicity [Fe/H]	−0.22±0.09 dex
Rotation	323.6 d
Rotational velocity (v sin i)	2.7 km/s
Age	1.8±0.7 Gyr

Other designations
- Xihe, AG+36 1680, BD+36 3246, GC 25640, HD 173416, HIP 91852, HR 7043, SAO 67292, PPM 81707, TYC 2649-1153-1, GCRV 11177, GSC 02649-01153, IRAS 18418+3630, 2MASS J18433610+3633237

Database references
SIMBAD	data
Exoplanet Archive	data

HD 173416, also named Xihe, is a star with an orbiting exoplanet in the northern constellation of Lyra. It is located at a distance of approximately 433 light-years based on parallax measurements, but is drifting closer to the Sun with a radial velocity of −61 km/s. It has a bright absolute magnitude of 0.406, but a much fainter apparent visual magnitude of 6.04. This indicates the star is dimly visible to the naked eye.

The spectrum of HD 173416 indicates this is an evolved G-type giant star with a stellar classification of G8 III. This means it has consumed the hydrogen at its stellar core and evolved off the main sequence. At an age of around two billion years, it has expanded to 13 times the radius of the Sun. The star has 1.8 times the mass of the Sun and is radiating 79 times the Sun's luminosity from its enlarged photosphere at an effective temperature of 4,790 K. Based on the abundance of iron in the stellar atmosphere, it has a sub-solar metallicity.

The star HD 173416 is named Xihe (羲和). The name was selected in the 2019 NameExoWorlds campaign by China, during the 100th anniversary of the IAU. Xihe is the goddess of the sun in the Chinese mythology and also represents the earliest astronomers and developers of calendars in ancient China. The exoplanet is named Wangshu (望舒) after the goddess who drives the Moon across the sky in Chinese mythology.

== Planetary system ==
In January 2009, an exoplanet of the star was discovered. This object was detected using the radial velocity method by search programs conducted from the Xinglong Station in China and the Okayama Astrophysical Observatory (OAO) in Japan. As the inclination of the orbital plane is unknown, only a lower bound on the mass can be determined. The mass of this object is at least 2.7 times the mass of Jupiter.

The HD 173416 planetary system
Companion (in order from star)	Mass	Semimajor axis (AU)	Orbital period (days)	Eccentricity	Inclination (°)	Radius
b	≥1.841+0.206 −0.225 M_{J}	1.158+0.003 −0.004	322.03+1.33 −1.52	0.208+0.089 −0.094	—	—

== See also ==
- List of exoplanets discovered between 2000–2009
