= 951 Gaspra =

S-type asteroid in the inner asteroid belt with stony mineralogical composition

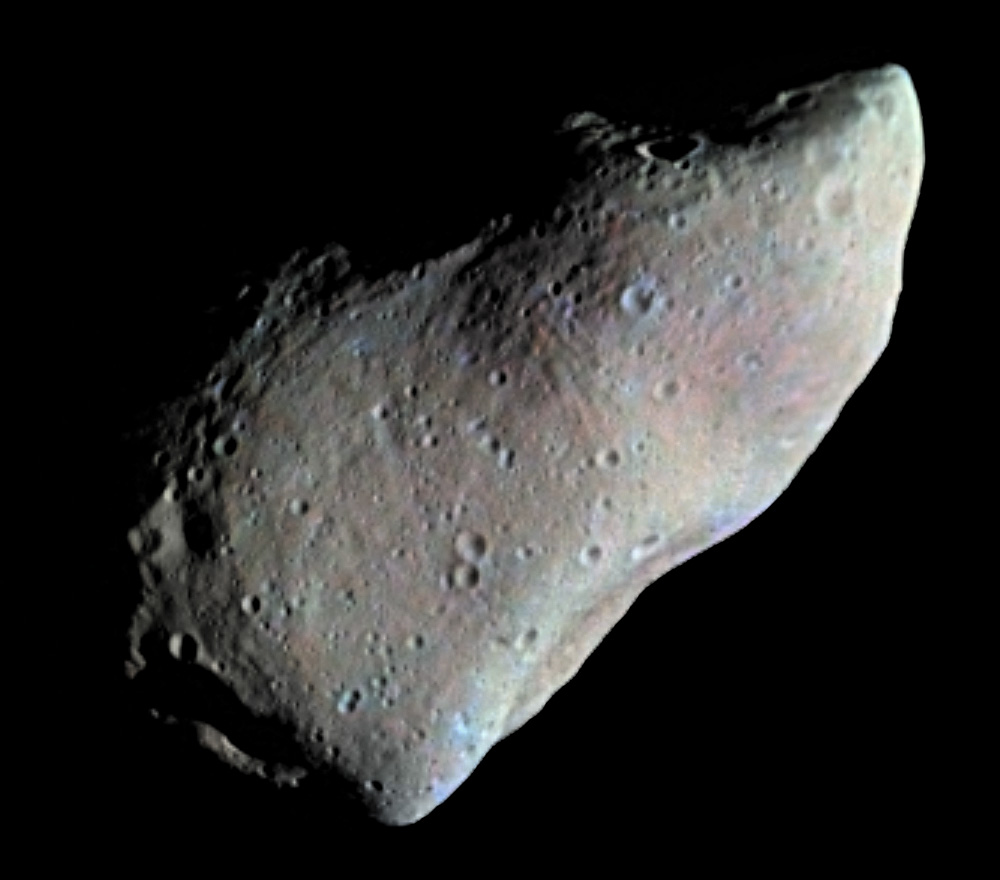
- Galileo image of 951 Gaspra; colors are exaggerated

Discovery
- Discovered by: G. Neujmin
- Discovery site: Simeiz Obs.
- Discovery date: 30 July 1916

Designations
- Pronunciation: /ˈɡæsprə/
- Named after: Gaspra (Crimean spa town)
- Alternative designations: 1916 S45 · 1916 Σ45; SIGMA 45 · A913 YA; 1955 MG_{1}
- Minor planet category: main-belt · (inner); Flora

Orbital characteristics
- Epoch 4 September 2017 (JD 2458000.5)
- Uncertainty parameter 0
- Observation arc: 103.54 yr (37,819 days)
- Aphelion: 2.5931 AU
- Perihelion: 1.8267 AU
- Semi-major axis: 2.2099 AU
- Eccentricity: 0.1734
- Orbital period (sidereal): 3.29 yr (1,200 days)
- Mean anomaly: 232.83°
- Mean motion: 0° 18^{m} 0^{s} / day
- Inclination: 4.1063°
- Longitude of ascending node: 253.06°
- Argument of perihelion: 129.94°

Physical characteristics
- Dimensions: 18.0 × 10.5 × 8.8 km
- Mean diameter: 12.2 ± 0.8 km
- Surface area: 525±50 km^{2}
- Volume: 850±200 km^{3}
- Mass: 2–3 × 10^{15} kg (estimate)
- Mean density: ~2.7 g/cm^{3} (estimate)
- Equatorial surface gravity: 0.38–0.57 cm/s^{2} (Note: Assuming a density of 3.5 g/cm^{3}.)
- Synodic rotation period: 7.042024±0.000020 h
- Axial tilt: 72°
- North pole right ascension: 9.5° ± 0.9°
- North pole declination: 26.7° ± 1.2°
- Geometric albedo: 0.220
- Spectral type: Tholen = S SMASS = S B–V = 0.870; U–B = 0.554
- Absolute magnitude (H): 11.46

951 Gaspra is an S-type asteroid that orbits very close to the inner edge of the asteroid belt. Gaspra was discovered by Russian astronomer G. N. Neujmin in 1916. Neujmin named it after Gaspra, a Black Sea retreat that was visited by his contemporaries, such as Gorky and Tolstoy.

Gaspra was the first asteroid to ever be visited by a spacecraft when it was visited by the Galileo spacecraft, which flew by on its way to Jupiter on 29 October 1991.

== Physical characteristics ==
Apart from a multitude of small craters, Gaspra has half a dozen large flat areas and concavities. One of these flat areas, Dunne Regio, is a 5 km × 7 km (3 mi × 4 1/2 mi) area that is flat to within 200 m (660 ft). It is uncertain whether these are the result of impacts or whether they are instead facets formed when Gaspra broke off its parent asteroid. In the weak, lopsided gravity of Gaspra, impact craters would naturally take on such flat, lopsided shapes, making this determination difficult. The flat facets and concavities give Gaspra a very angular appearance.

Gaspra's surface area has been calculated at about 525 km^{2}, which, for comparison, is about the size of Guam, or half the land area of Hong Kong.

=== Composition ===
Gaspra appears to be fairly olivine-rich among the S-type asteroids (the surface appears to contain olivine and pyroxene in the proportions 4:1 to 7:1). There are no prominent albedo or color patterns, although a subtle color variation is seen across the surface.

== Surface features ==
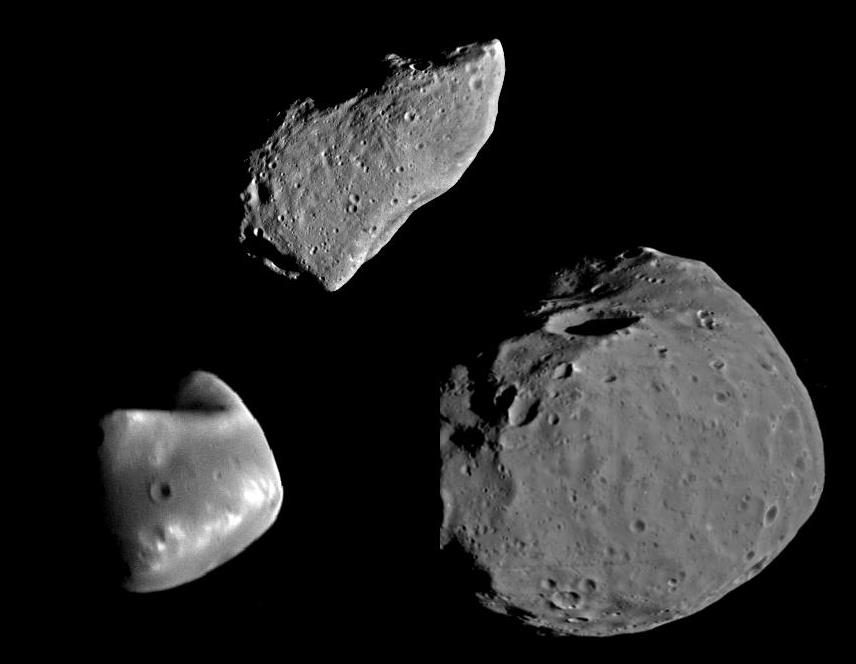
Gaspra (top) and the Martian moons Phobos and Deimos, to scale

Gaspra's surface lacks unambiguous craters of a size comparable to its radius, like those seen for example on 253 Mathilde. A probable reason is that the collision that produced the Flora family and Gaspra was relatively recent on an astronomical timescale, so that Gaspra has not yet had the opportunity to acquire many large craters since. Analysis of cratering rates suggests the age of the surface is between about 20 to 300 million years. It was suggested in 2007 that the fresh, steep craters on Gaspra were formed by the Baptistina family-forming event that happened near it.

Grooves about 100 m (330 ft) to 300 m (980 ft) wide, up to 2.5 km (1.6 mi) long, and tens of meters deep are seen on Gaspra's surface, which may be related to Gaspra's formation along with the rest of the Flora family in an asteroid collision. Their presence also suggest that it is a single coherent body, rather than a rubble pile. The grooves were likely created by impacts that shattered the underlying rock. A system of much more prominent grooves is seen on the Martian moon Phobos. The pitted appearance of some grooves may suggest that the surface is covered by a regolith.

The extensiveness of regolith on Gaspra and its presence overall is a matter of debate, and not fully understood. Visually, the somewhat subdued and mantled appearance suggests a substantial regolith. Also, correlations are seen between the subtle color variations and local topography, and it has been suggested that this is caused by the slow migration of regolith to lower areas. It is, however, difficult to explain the origin of a putative regolith. Firstly, Gaspra's escape velocity is very small, so small that it is difficult to understand how it could keep a significant portion of fragments ejected by impacts from escaping. This may be alleviated if Gaspra is a porous body or started with a large regolith, but one has to explain how the original regolith appeared. A possible resolution of the issue may be that Gaspra obtained a regolith during the Flora-family forming impact that also created Gaspra itself. Secondly, it has been estimated that the matter ejected by all the craters would be only enough to cover Gaspra with 10 m of regolith. However, some craters are much deeper than this without showing any structural difference on their walls.

== Orbit and rotation ==
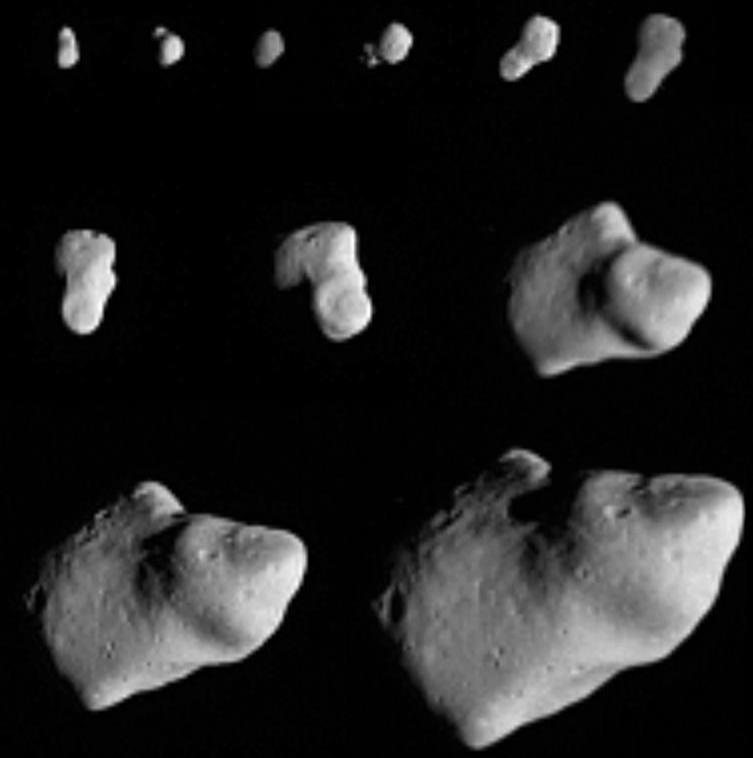
Successive images of a rotating Gaspra

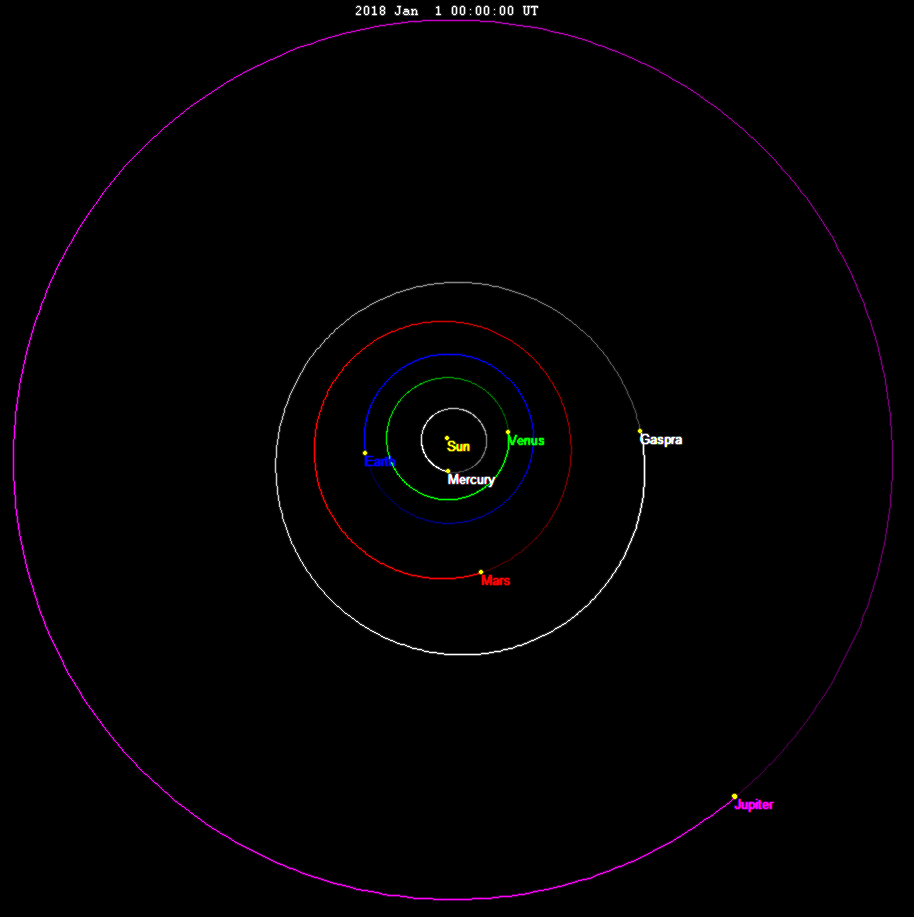
Gaspra orbits the Sun just outside of the orbit of Mars.

Gaspra orbits the Sun at an average distance of about 2.21 astronomical units. Gaspra completes one orbit around the Sun in 3.29 years.

Gaspra's rotational axis has been determined to point in the direction of RA 0h40m, declination 27±2°. This is equivalent to ecliptic coordinates (β, λ) = (21°, 20°) and gives an axial tilt of 72°.

The Galileo flyby was too distant for a body of Gaspra's small size to noticeably affect Galileo's trajectory, so no information on Gaspra's mass was obtained. (Galileo also visited 243 Ida where it discovered a moon, allowing a mass estimate there.)

== Exploration ==
Animation of Galileo's trajectory from 19 October 1989 to 30 September 2003 Galileo · Jupiter · Earth · Venus · 951 Gaspra · 243 Ida

Galileo flew by Gaspra on 29 October 1991, passing within 1,600 km (990 mi) at a relative speed of about 8 km/s (18,000 mph). Fifty-seven images were returned to Earth, the closest taken from a distance of 5,300 km (3,300 mi). The best images have a resolution of about 54 meters per pixel (177.16 ft). The area around the southern pole was not seen during the flyby, but the remaining 80% of the asteroid was imaged.

Because Gaspra's position was only known to within about 200 km (120 mi) before the encounter, and the camera's field of view was only about 5° across, Galileo would not know where to point to capture images of the asteroid once it was closer than 70,000 km (43,000 mi). This would render the encounter not very interesting scientifically. To overcome this problem, a pioneering optical navigation campaign was implemented by the Galileo spacecraft team to reduce the uncertainty of Gaspra's position using images captured during the approach to Gaspra. This was successful and allowed the spacecraft to obtain images from as close as 5,300 km (3,300 mi). At this closest range, the pointing was still not known accurately enough, but the camera took a 51 image mosaic so as to capture Gaspra on at least one image.
