= Old City of Luoyang =

Historical Luoyang between the 1st and 6th centuries

Luoyang
- 洛陽 (Chinese)
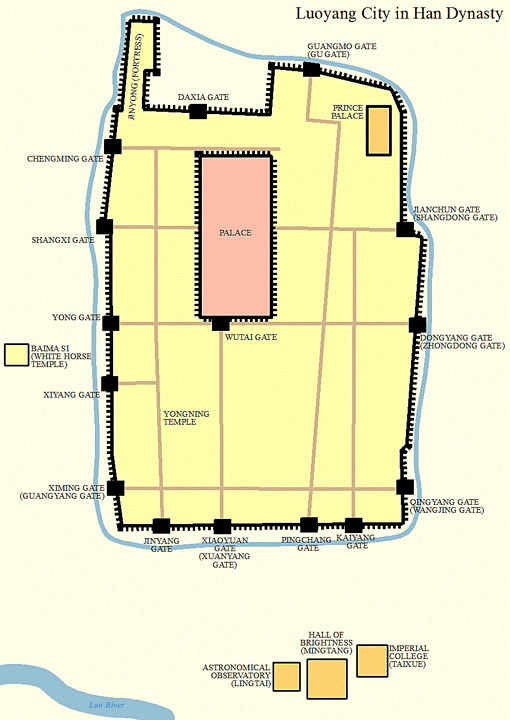

- Location within Henan
- 34°43′43″N 112°37′21″E
- Location: Henan, China

History
- Built: 26 AD

Major cultural heritage sites under national-level protection

UNESCO World Heritage Site

The Old City of Luoyang is a site located 15 kilometres (9.3 mi) east of the urban area of modern Luoyang. It was the capital of the Northern Wei dynasty. Emperor Yang of Sui rebuilt the city in 605. The Old City was listed as major cultural heritage sites under national-level protection in 1961, and as a UNESCO World Cultural Heritage site in 2014, as one part of the larger Silk Roads: the Routes Network of Chang'an-Tianshan Corridor designation.

== Current status and archaeological activity ==
The existing structure and layout of the Old City is essentially left over from the Northern Wei dynasty, with a length of 10 kilometres (6.2 mi) from east to west and 7.5 kilometres (4.7 mi) from north to south. The total area is about 75 square kilometers. The existing important relics mainly include: the Northern Wei-era inner city wall (that is, Luoyang during the Han, Wei and Jin), the outer Guocheng City of the Northern Wei, Gongcheng, Jinyong, Yongning Temple and the base of the Yongning Temple Tower, Taiji Hall, Changhe Gate, Taixue of the Eastern Han, Mingtang, Biyong, Lingtai, Eastern Han Cemetery, Northern Wei Dashi, Rented Cattle and Horse Market, and the Eastern Han Prisoner's Cemetery. A large number of cultural relics were unearthed, including ceramics, clay statues, iron wares, copper coins (ware), gold and silver wares.
