= 150s =

Decade

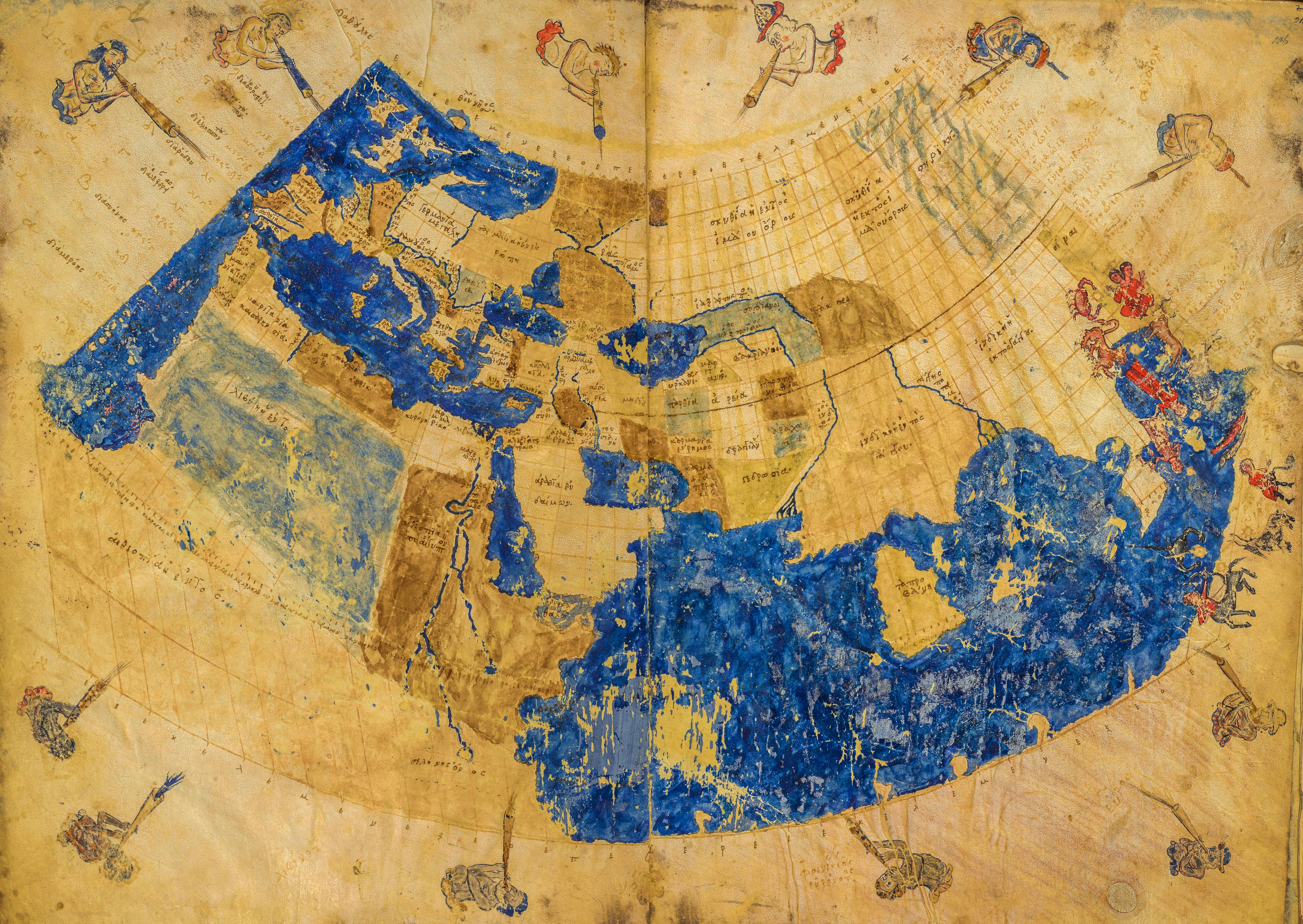
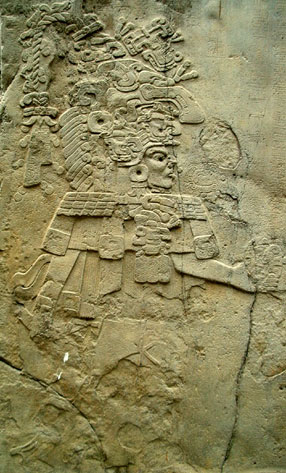
Ptolemy's Geographia is made around 150, the earliest known atlas; The La Mojarra Stela 1, dated to 156, is produced, one of the earliest known written records in Mesoamerica.

The 150s ran from January 1, 150, to December 31, 159.

The Roman Empire was ruled by Antoninus Pius for the whole of this decade. The Roman Empire was relatively peaceful this decade, being in the middle of the Pax Romana and there being no major external wars. Claudius Ptolemy completed two major works this decade, the Geographia, the earliest known atlas, and the Almagest, a treatise accepted for over 1200 years.

== Events ==
=== By place ===
==== Roman Empire ====
- The Roman town Forum Hadriani (Voorburg) receives the title of Municipium Aelium Cananefatium, "the town of the Cananefates" (modern Netherlands). The town is awarded with rights to organize markets.
- The Germans of the east move south, into the Carpathians and Black Sea area.
- The Albani appear in the Roman province of Macedonia, specifically in Epirus.

==== Asia ====
- First and only year of the "Heping" era of the Han dynasty in China.

==== Americas ====
- The Middle Culture period of Mayan civilization ends (approximate date).
- The Great Pyramid of the Sun is constructed in Teotihuacan. It is the tallest pre-Columbian building in the Americas.

=== By topic ===
==== Religion ====
- Marcion of Sinope produces his Bible canon, consisting of purged versions of the Gospel of Luke and ten Pauline letters (approximate date).

==== Art and science ====
- The earliest atlas (Ptolemy's Geography) is made (approximate date).
- This is also the approximate date of completion of Ptolemy's monumental work Almagest. The geocentric cosmology contained in it holds sway for 1,400 years.
- Antoninus Liberalis writes a work on mythology (Μεταμορφωσεων Συναγωγη) (approximate date).
- Paper, made in China, arrives in Transoxiana.

=== By place ===
==== Asia ====
- Mytilene and Smyrna are destroyed by an earthquake.
- First year of Yuanjia of the Chinese Han dynasty.

=== By topic ===
==== Art ====
- Detail from a rubbing of a stone relief in Wu family shrine (Wuliangci), Jiaxiang, Shandong, is made (Han dynasty).

=== By place ===
==== Asia ====
- The Chinese domination of the Tarim Basin weakens.

=== By place ===
==== Roman Empire ====
- Minor uprisings occur in Roman Egypt against Roman rule.

==== Asia ====
- Change of era name from Yuanjia (3rd year) to Yongxing of the Chinese Han Dynasty.

=== By place ===
==== Roman Empire ====
- King Eupator of Bosphorus pays tribute to Rome, due to the threat posed by the Alani.
- The Antonine Wall is completed.

==== Asia ====
- Last (2nd) year of Yongxing era of the Chinese Han Dynasty.
- Adalla becomes ruler of the Korean kingdom of Silla.

=== By topic ===
==== Religion ====
- Anicetus becomes pope of Rome (approximate date).
- Anicetus meets with Polycarp of Smyrna to discuss the Computus, the date of Easter in the Christian liturgical calendar.
- Change of Patriarch of Constantinople from Patriarch Euzois to Patriarch Laurence.

=== 155 ===
- The Council of Rome, a pre-ecumenical church council, is held and presided over by Bishop of Rome Anicetus.

=== By place ===
==== America ====
- The La Mojarra Stela 1 is produced in Mesoamerica.

=== By topic ===
==== Religion ====
- The heresiarch Montanus first appears in Ardaban (Mysia).

=== Roman Empire ===
- A revolt against Roman rule begins in Dacia.

=== Asia ===
- In Jiuzhen (modern day Northern Vietnam), during the second Era of Northern Domination, a rebellion led by Chu Đạt breaks out and lasts for two to three years, until it is quelled by the Han Dynasty, under emperor Huan.

=== By place ===
==== Roman Empire ====
- The earliest dated use of Sol Invictus, in a dedication from Rome.
- A revolt against Roman rule in Dacia is crushed.

==== China ====
- Change of era name from Yongshou to Yangxi of the Chinese Han dynasty.

=== By place ===
==== India ====
- In India, the reign of Shivashri Satakarni, as King Satavahana of Andhra, begins.

== Significant people ==
- Antoninus Pius, Roman Emperor (138–161)

== Births ==
150

- March 7 – Lucilla, Roman empress (d. 182)
- Cassius Dio, Roman historian (approximate year)
- Clement of Alexandria, Greek theologian (d. 215)
- Gongsun Du, Chinese general and warlord (d. 204)
- Lucius Fabius Cilo, Roman politician (approximate date)
- Monoimus, Arab gnostic and writer (approximate date)
- Nagarjuna, founder of Mahayana "Great Vehicle" (d. c. 250)
- Xu Shao, Chinese official of the Han dynasty (d. 195)
- Yufuluo, Chanyu of the southern Xiongnu (d. 196)
- Zhang Zhongjing, Chinese physician (d. 219)

151

- Annia Galeria Aurelia Faustina, daughter of Marcus Aurelius
- Zhong Yao, Chinese official and calligrapher (d. 230)

152

- Bao Xin, Chinese general and warlord (d. 192)

153

- Didia Clara, daughter of Didius Julianus
- Kong Rong, Chinese official and warlord (d. 208)
- Zhang Hong, Chinese official and politician (d. 212)

154

- July 11 – Bardaisan, Syriac gnostic (d. 222)

155

- Cao Cao, Chinese statesman and warlord (d. 220)
- Dio Cassius, Roman historian (d. c. 235)
- Tertullian, Roman Christian theologian (d. c. 240)
- Sun Jian, Chinese general and warlord (d. 191)

156

- Dong Zhao, Chinese official and minister (d. 236)
- Ling of Han, Chinese emperor of the Han Dynasty (d. 189)
- Pontianus of Spoleto, Christian martyr and saint (d. 175)
- Zhang Zhao, Chinese general and politician (d. 236)
- Zhu Zhi, Chinese general and politician (d. 224)

157

- Gaius Caesonius Macer Rufinianus, Roman politician (d. 237)
- Hua Xin, Chinese official and minister (d. 232)
- Liu Yao, Chinese governor and warlord (d. 198)
- Xun You, Chinese official and statesman (d. 214)

158

- Gaius Caesonius Macer Rufinianus, Roman politician (d. 237)

159

- December 30 – Lady Bian, wife of Cao Cao (d. 230)
- Annia Aurelia Fadilla, daughter of Marcus Aurelius
- Gordian I, Roman emperor (d. 238)
- Lu Zhi, Chinese general (d. 192)

== Deaths ==
150

- Aspasius, Greek philosopher and writer (approximate date)
- Aśvaghoṣa, Indian philosopher and poet (approximate date)
- Liang Na, Chinese empress of the Han dynasty (b. 116)

151

- Kanishka, Indian ruler of the Kushan Empire
- Novatus, Christian saint (approximate date)

152

- January 14 – Markianos, patriarch of Alexandria
- Yan Ming, Chinese empress of the Han Dynasty

153

- Tiberius Julius Rhoemetalces, Roman client king

154

- Euzois, bishop of Byzantium
- Ilseong, Korean ruler of Silla
- Pius I, pope of Rome (approximate date)

155

- Pius I, Roman bishop
- Polycarp, bishop of Smyrna (b. AD 65)

156

- Marcus Gavius Maximus, Roman praetorian prefect
- Zhang Daoling, Chinese Taoist master (b. AD 34)

158

- Wang Yi, Chinese librarian and poet (b. AD 89)

159

- Liang Ji, Chinese general and regent
- Liang Nüying, Chinese empress
