= 120s =

Decade

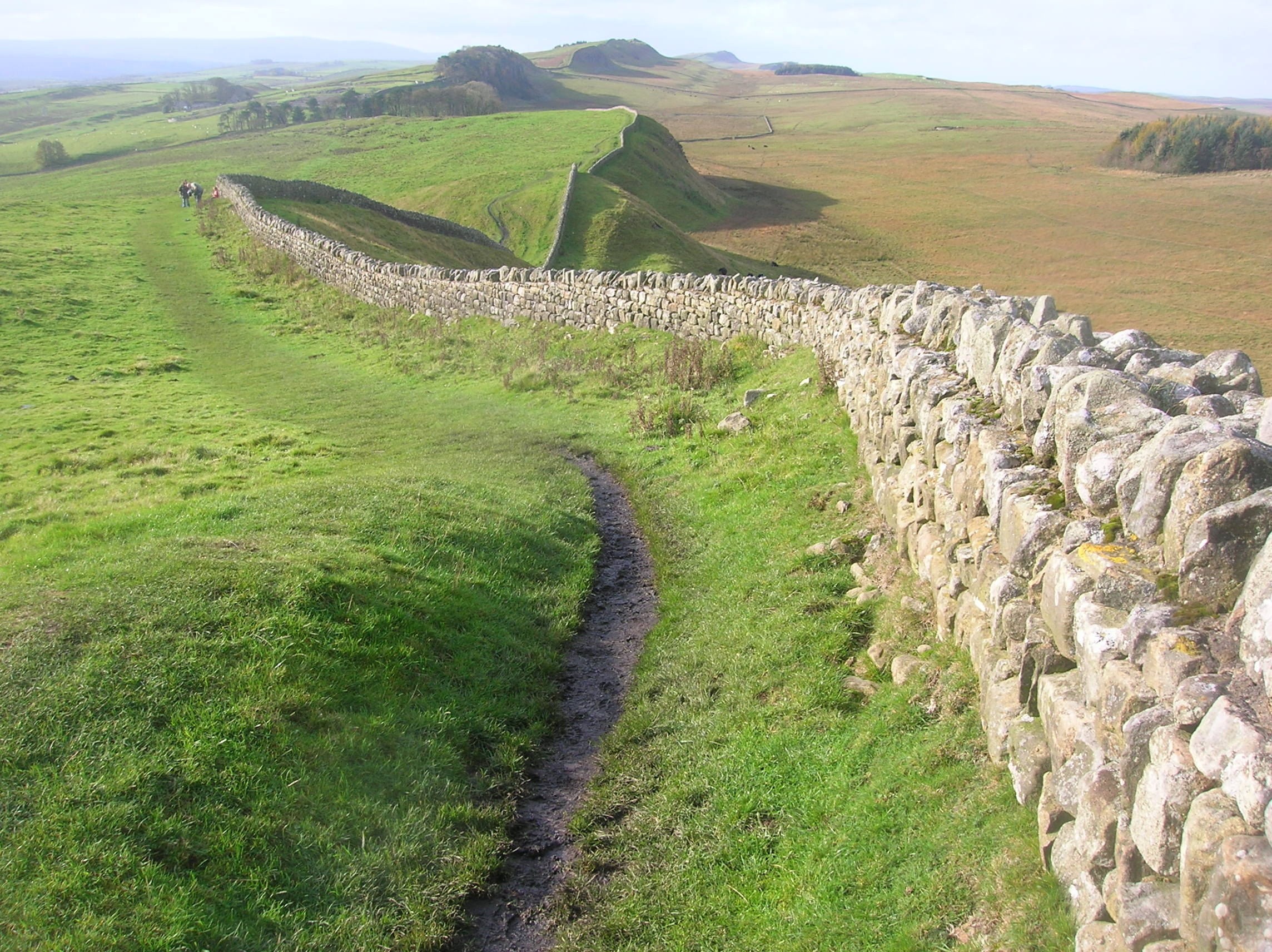
A view of Hadrian's Wall, which began construction in 122.

The 120s was a decade that ran from January 1, AD 120, to December 31, AD 129.

During this decade, the Roman Empire was ruled by Emperor Hadrian (r. 117–138). In the prior decade, he had succeeded Emperor Trajan, who had expanded the empire to its greatest extent. Hadrian, in contrast, adopted a more defensive foreign policy, focusing on consolidating the empire's borders and improving its infrastructure, such as Hadrian's Wall in Britain. There was almost a renewed war with Parthia, but the threat was averted when Hadrian succeeded in negotiating a peace in 123 (according to the Historia Augusta, disputed). Furthermore, Hadrian enacted, through the jurist Salvius Julianus, the first attempt to codify Roman law. This was the Perpetual Edict, according to which the legal actions of praetors became fixed statutes and, as such, could no longer be subjected to personal interpretation or change by any magistrate other than the Emperor.

The Chinese Eastern Han dynasty saw the death of regent Deng Sui in 121, after which Emperor An took on the reins of the imperial administration. In 121, there were again Qiang and Xianbei rebellions, which would continue to plague Emperor An for the rest of his reign. The only border where there were Han accomplishments during Emperor An's reign was on the northwestern front—the Xiyu (modern Xinjiang and former Soviet central Asia)—where Ban Chao's son Ban Yong (班勇) was able to reestablish Han dominance over a number of kingdoms. Emperor An was succeeded by Marquess of Beixiang in 125, who reigned for a short time before being succeeded by Emperor Shun of Han that same year. At the start of Emperor Shun's reign, the people were hopeful that he would reform the political situation from the pervasive corruption under the Yans. However, the teenage emperor proved to be a kind but weak ruler. While he trusted certain honest officials, he also trusted many corrupt eunuchs, who quickly grabbed power.

== Events ==
=== 120 ===
==== By place ====
====== Roman Empire ======
- Emperor Hadrian visits Britain.
- Foss Dyke is constructed in Britain.
- A Kushan ambassadorial contingent visits with Hadrian.
- Suetonius becomes Hadrian's secretary ab epistolis.
- Approximate date
  - Legio IX Hispana last known to be in existence.
  - The Market Gate of Miletus is built at Miletos (moved in modern times to Staatliche Museen zu Berlin, Preußischer Kulturbesitz, Antikensammlung).

====== Asia ======
- Change of era name from Yuanchu (7th year) to Yongning of the Chinese Eastern Han dynasty.
- The Scythians dominate western India: Punjab, Sind, the north of Gujarat and a portion of central India.

=== 121 ===
==== By place ====
====== Roman Empire ======
- Roman settlement in present-day Wiesbaden, Germany, is first mentioned.
- Emperor Hadrian fixes the border between Roman Britain and Caledonia, on a line running from the River Tyne to the Solway Firth.
- Construction of the Temple of Venus and Roma begins in Rome.

====== Asia ======
- Era name changes from Yongning (2nd year) to Jianguang in the Chinese Eastern Han dynasty.^{(Needs clarification or deletion)}

=== 122 ===
==== By place ====
====== Roman Empire ======
- Emperor Hadrian orders that a 73-mile (117-kilometer) wall be built to mark the northern Roman Empire while personally visiting the area. Hadrian's Wall, as it comes to be known, is intended to keep the Caledonians, Picts and other tribes at bay.
- Vindolanda, a Roman auxiliary fort (castrum) in northern England, is garrisoned by cohort VIII Batavorum.
- September 13 – The building of Hadrian's Wall begins.
- Hadrian gives up the territories conquered in Scotland.

====== Asia ======
- Change of era name from Jianguang (2nd year) to Yanguang of the Chinese Eastern Han dynasty.

=== 123 ===
==== By place ====
====== Roman Empire ======
- Emperor Hadrian averts a war with Parthia by a personal meeting with Osroes I (according to the Historia Augusta, disputed).
- Housesteads Fort is constructed on Hadrian's Wall north of Bardon Mill.
- Hadrian's Villa at Tivoli is built.
- The Temple of Al-Lat in Palmyra is dedicated somewhere between this year and 164 AD.

====== Asia ======
- In China, Ban Yong, son of Ban Chao, reestablishes the Chinese control over the Tarim Basin.
- The Chinese government establishes Aide of the Western Regions over the Tarim Basin.

====== Africa ======
- Hadrian leads a punitive campaign against Berbers who had been raiding Roman towns in Roman Mauretania.

==== By topic ====
====== Arts and sciences ======
- Chinese scientist Zhang Heng corrects the calendar to bring it into line with the four seasons.

=== 124 ===
==== By place ====
====== Roman Empire ======
- January 1 – Gaius Bellicius Torquatus and Manius Acilius Glabrio begin the year as the new consuls, but the two are replaced in April.
- May – Aulus Larcius Macedo, the former Governor of Galatia; and Publius Ducenius Verres take office for four month as the suffect consuls to succeed Bellicius and Glabrio, and serve until the end of August.
- September – Gaius Valerius Severus and Gaius Julius Gallus replace consuls Larcius and Ducenius and serve until the end of the year.
- Emperor Hadrian begins to rebuild the Olympeion in Athens.
- Antinous becomes Hadrian's beloved companion on his journeys through the Roman Empire.
- During a voyage to Greece, Hadrian is initiated in the ancient rites known as the Eleusinian Mysteries.

====== Asia ======
- In northern India, Nahapana, ruler of the Scythians, is defeated and dies in battle while fighting against King Gautamiputra Satakarni. This defeat destroys the Scythian dynasty of the Western Kshatrapas.

=== 125 ===
==== By place ====
====== Roman Empire ======
- The Pantheon is constructed (in Rome) as it stands today, by Hadrian.
- Emperor Hadrian establishes the Panhellenion. (in 131-32)
- Hadrian distributes imperial lands to small farmers.
- Hadrian's Villa, Tivoli, Italy, starts to be built (approximate date).

====== Africa ======
- Plague sweeps North Africa in the wake of a locust invasion that destroys large areas of cropland. The plague kills as many as 500,000 in Numidia and possibly 150,000 on the coast before moving to Italy, where it takes so many lives that villages and towns are abandoned. (or was it around 125 BC)

====== Asia ======
- Last (4th) year of the Yanguang era of the Chinese Han dynasty.
- Change of emperor of the Chinese Han dynasty from Han Andi to Marquis of Beixiang, then to Han Shundi.
- Gautamiputra Satakarni, a king of the Andhra dynasty, conquers the Konkan near Bombay. He then controls central India from coast to coast.
- Zhang Heng of Han dynasty China invents a hydraulic-powered armillary sphere.
- The epoch of the Javanese calendar begins.

==== By topic ====
====== Arts and sciences ======
- The Satires of Juvenal intimate that bread and circuses (panem et circenses) keep the Roman people happy.

====== Religion ======
- Pope Telesphorus succeeds Pope Sixtus I as the eighth pope according to Roman Catholic tradition.

=== 126 ===
==== By place ====
====== Roman Empire ======
- The old Pantheon is demolished by Emperor Hadrian, and the construction of a new one begins (its date is uncertain, because Hadrian chooses not to inscribe the temple).

====== Asia ======
- First year of the Yongjian era of the Chinese Han dynasty.

=== 127 ===
==== By place ====
====== Roman Empire ======
- Emperor Hadrian returns to Rome, after a seven-year voyage to the Roman provinces.
- Hadrian, acting on the advice of his proconsul of Asia, Gaius Minicius Fundanus, determines that Christians shall not be put to death without a trial.

====== India ======
- Kanishka I starts to rule in the Kushan Empire (approximate date).

==== By topic ====
====== Religion ======
- The philosopher Carpocrates rejects ownership of private property as being un-Christian.

=== 128 ===
==== By place ====
====== Roman Empire ======
- Emperor Hadrian visits the Roman province of North Africa, in order to inspect Legio III Augusta stationed at Lambaesis. For strategic reasons, the legionnaires are located in the Aurès Mountains.
- Hadrian's Wall is completed in Britain. Built mostly of stone in the east and with a wooden palisade in the west. They construct at least 16 forts, with about 15,000 legionaries digging ditches, quarrying rock and cutting stone, preventing idleness which led to unrest and rebellions in the ranks.
- Roman agriculture declines, as imports from Egypt and North Africa depress wheat prices, making it unprofitable to farm, and forcing many farmers off the land.
- Roman bakeries produce dozens of bread varieties, and the Romans distribute free bread for the poor.
- Hadrian begins his inspection of the provinces of Greece, Asia Minor and Egypt.

====== Asia ======
- King Gaeru of Baekje succeeds to the throne of Baekje in the Korean peninsula (until 166).

==== By topic ====
====== Arts and sciences ======
- The fossils of large prehistoric animals are discovered in Dalmatia.
- The Pantheon in Rome is finished.

=== 129 ===
==== By place ====
====== Roman Empire ======
- A defense for Numidia is constructed at Lambaesis by Legio III Augusta.
- Emperor Hadrian continues his voyages, now inspecting Caria, Cappadocia and Syria.

==== By topic ====
====== Songs ======
- The song "Angel's Hymn" is made.

====== Religion ======
- Change of Patriarch of Constantinople, from Patriarch Diogenes to Eleutherius.

== Significant people ==
- Hadrian, Roman Emperor (117–138)

== Births ==
120

- February 8 – Vettius Valens, Greek astrologer (d. 175)
- Irenaeus, Greek bishop and apologist (approximate date)
- Lucian, Syrian rhetorician and satirist (approximate date)
- Tatian, Syrian Christian writer and theologian (d. 180)

121

- April 26 – Marcus Annius Verus, later Emperor Marcus Aurelius (d. 180)

123

- Annia Cornificia Faustina, sister of Marcus Aurelius (d. 158)

124

- Apuleius, Numidian novelist, writer, public speaker (approximate date)

125

- Aulus Gellius, Roman author and grammarian (approximate date)
- Lucian, Syrian satirist and rhetorician (approximate date)
- Lucius Ferenius, Dutch potter in Heerlen (approximate date)
- Tiberius Claudius Pompeianus, Roman politician (d. 193)

126

- August 1 – Pertinax, Roman emperor (d. 193)
- Lu Kang, Chinese politician and prefect (d. 195)

127

- Zheng Xuan, Chinese politician, philosopher (d. 200)

128

- Xun Shuang, Chinese politician and writer (d. 190)

129

- Chen Ji, Chinese official, chancellor (d. 199)
- Galen, Greek physician, anatomist (d. c. 200/216)
- Liu Hong, Chinese official, astronomer (d. 210)

== Deaths ==
120

- Ban Zhao, Chinese historian and philosopher (b. AD 49)
- Dio Chrysostom, Greek historian (approximate date)
- Faustinus and Jovita, Roman Christian martyrs
- Getulius, Roman officer and Christian martyr
- Hermes, Greek Christian martyr and saint
- Marcian of Tortona, Roman bishop (or 117)
- Matthias of Jerusalem, bishop of Jerusalem
- Nicomachus, Greek mathematician (b. AD 60)
- Plutarch, Greek philosopher (approximate date)
- Sextus Pedius, Roman jurist (b. AD 50)
- Tacitus, Roman historian

121

- Cai Lun, Chinese inventor of paper and the papermaking process (b. AD 50)
- Deng Sui, Chinese empress of the Han dynasty (b. AD 81)
- Eleutherius and Antia, Roman Christian martyrs and saints

124

- Marcus Annius Verus, father of Marcus Aurelius
- Nahapana, ruler of the Scythians (approximate date)
- Sixtus I, bishop of Rome according to Roman Catholic tradition (possible date)

125

- April 30 – An of Han, Chinese emperor (b. AD 94)
- December 10 – Shao (or Liu Yi), Chinese emperor
- Servius Sulpicius Similis, Roman governor
- Thamel, Roman Christian priest and martyr

126

- Domitia Longina, Roman empress (b. c. 53 AD)
- Yan Ji (or Ansi), Chinese empress

127

- Juvenal, Roman poet (approximate year)
- Plutarch, Greek historian and biographer (b. AD 46)
- Publius Metilius Nepos, Roman politician (b. AD 45)

128

- Giru of Baekje, Korean ruler

129

- June 19 – Justus of Alexandria, Egyptian patriarch
- King Osroes I of the Parthian Empire
