= AD 125 =

125 in various calendars
- Gregorian calendar: 125; CXXV
- Ab urbe condita: 878
- Assyrian calendar: 4875
- Balinese saka calendar: 46–47
- Bengali calendar: −469 – −468
- Berber calendar: 1075
- Buddhist calendar: 669
- Burmese calendar: −513
- Byzantine calendar: 5633–5634
- Chinese calendar: 甲子年 (Wood Rat); 2822 or 2615 — to — 乙丑年 (Wood Ox); 2823 or 2616
- Coptic calendar: −159 – −158
- Discordian calendar: 1291
- Ethiopian calendar: 117–118
- Hebrew calendar: 3885–3886
- Hindu calendars
- Vikram Samvat: 181–182
- Shaka Samvat: 46–47
- Kali Yuga: 3225–3226
- Holocene calendar: 10125
- Iranian calendar: 497 BP – 496 BP
- Islamic calendar: 512 BH – 511 BH
- Javanese calendar: 0–1
- Julian calendar: 125; CXXV
- Korean calendar: 2458
- Minguo calendar: 1787 before ROC 民前1787年
- Nanakshahi calendar: −1343
- Seleucid era: 436/437 AG
- Thai solar calendar: 667–668
- Tibetan calendar: ཤིང་ཕོ་བྱི་བ་ལོ་ (male Wood-Rat); 251 or −130 or −902 — to — ཤིང་མོ་གླང་ལོ་ (female Wood-Ox); 252 or −129 or −901

Year 125 (CXXV) was a common year starting on Sunday of the Julian calendar. At the time, it was known as the Year of the Consulship of Paullinus and Titius (or, less frequently, year 878 Ab urbe condita). The denomination 125 for this year has been used since the early medieval period, when the Anno Domini calendar era became the prevalent method in Europe for naming years.

== Events ==
=== By place ===
==== Roman Empire ====
- The Pantheon is constructed in Rome, as it stands today.
- Hadrian's Villa, Tivoli, Italy, starts to be built (approximate date).

==== Africa ====
- Plague sweeps North Africa in the wake of a locust invasion that destroys large areas of cropland. The plague kills as many as 500,000 in Numidia and possibly 150,000 on the coast before moving to Italy, where it takes so many lives that villages and towns are abandoned. (or was it around 125 BC)

==== Asia ====
- Last (4th) year of the Yanguang era of the Chinese Han dynasty.
- Change of emperor of the Chinese Han dynasty from Han Andi to Marquis of Beixiang, then to Han Shundi.
- Gautamiputra Satakarni, a king of the Andhra dynasty, conquers the Konkan near Bombay. He then controls central India from coast to coast.
- Zhang Heng of Han dynasty China invents a hydraulic-powered armillary sphere.

=== By topic ===
==== Arts and sciences ====
- The Satires of Juvenal intimate that bread and circuses (panem et circenses) keep the Roman people happy.

==== Religion ====
- Pope Telesphorus succeeds Pope Sixtus I as the eighth pope according to Roman Catholic tradition.

== Births ==
- Aulus Gellius, Roman author and grammarian (approximate date)
- Lucian, Syrian satirist and rhetorician (approximate date)
- Lucius Ferenius, Dutch potter in Heerlen (approximate date)
- Tiberius Claudius Pompeianus, Roman politician (d. 193)

== Deaths ==
- April 30 – An of Han, Chinese emperor (b. AD 94)
- December 10 – Shao (or Liu Yi), Chinese emperor
- Servius Sulpicius Similis, Roman governor
- Thamel, Roman Christian priest and martyr
