= Cao Teng =

2nd century Eastern Han dynasty eunuch official

- 曹騰

Empress's Chamberlain (大長秋)
- In office c.146–?
- Monarch: Emperor Huan of Han

Central Regular Attendant (中常侍)
- In office 126 – 146
- Monarch: Emperor Shun of Han

Personal details
- Born: Unknown Bozhou, Anhui
- Died: c. late 150s
- Spouse: Lady Wu
- Children: Cao Song (adopted son)
- Occupation: Eunuch, official
- Courtesy name: Jixing (季興)
- Peerage: Marquis of Fei Village (費亭侯)
Posthumous name
- Emperor Gao of Wei (魏高帝)

Cao Teng (died c. late 150s), (Note: Cao Teng's biography in Book of the Later Han recorded that he died before Zhong Hao (种暠) was appointed situ. Emperor Huan's biography in the same work recorded that Zhong was appointed situ in the 2nd month of the 4th year of the Yanxi era; the month corresponds to 15 Mar to 12 Apr 161 in the Julian calendar. Thus, Cao Teng must have died before Mar 161.) courtesy name Jixing, was a eunuch who lived during the Eastern Han dynasty of China. He served four Han emperors (Shun, Chong, Zhi, and Huan). Through his adopted son Cao Song, he was the grandfather of Cao Cao, who laid the foundations for the state of Cao Wei in the Three Kingdoms period. On 3 August 229, during the reign of Cao Cao's grandson Cao Rui, Cao Teng was posthumously honoured as "Emperor Gao of Wei" (魏高帝), (Note: The Zizhi Tongjian recorded the same date for this event; Hu Sanxing wrote that the "Grand Chamberlain" mentioned was Cao Teng.) becoming the only eunuch in Chinese officialdom to have this honor.

== Life ==
Cao Teng served as an Attendant at the Yellow Gates (小黃門) in the Han imperial court during the reign of Emperor An. In 120, when Emperor Shun was still a prince, Empress Dowager Deng Sui appointed Cao Teng to serve the prince because Cao Teng was honest, modest and prudent. Cao Teng gained the trust of Emperor Shun and became his personal friend. In 126, after Emperor Shun ascended the throne, Cao Teng was promoted to Central Regular Attendant (中常侍), the highest possible rank for a court eunuch.

After Emperor Shun died, his infant son Emperor Chong died after just one year on the throne. The consort kin Liang Ji installed the seven-year-old Liu Zuan (劉纘) on the throne, overruling the popularity of another candidate, Liu Suan (劉蒜). Despite his young age, Liu Zuan showed signs of resentment towards Liang Ji's domineering influence, and was soon poisoned by the general. The imperial court was once again divided in deciding the successor. One group, led by Li Gu, wanted to install Liu Suan on the throne, while Liang Ji led another faction which supported the young Liu Zhi (劉志). Cao Teng took Liang Ji's side and urged him to defy his critics, and soon the majority backed down.

After Liu Zhi, or Emperor Huan as he was known posthumously, ascended the throne, Cao Teng was rewarded with enfeoffment as the Marquis of Fei Village (費亭侯) for his participation in the succession debate. He was later promoted to Empress's Chamberlain (大長秋) and was placed in charge of the household of Empress Liang Nüying. He also served as Coachman of the Changle Palace (長樂宮太僕) of Empress Dowager Liang Na.

Cao Teng stayed in the court for 30 years, having served four emperors, and was said to have never made big mistakes. The people he promoted were all very famous throughout the empire, such as Yu Fang (虞放), Bian Shao (邊韶) and Zhao Dian (趙典). Cao Teng was a broad-minded person. Once, a provincial governor Zhong Hao (種暠) found evidence that Cao Teng had received bribes and tried, unsuccessfully, to impeach Cao Teng. Despite this, Cao Teng often recommended Zhong Hao to higher positions. Cao Teng was remembered by his contemporaries for his personality and integrity. After Cao Teng died in the late 150s, his foster son Cao Song inherited his marquis title.

== See also ==
- Lists of people of the Three Kingdoms
