= Lady Chen =

Mother of Chinese Emperor Zhi of Han

Lady Chen (Chinese: 陈夫人; fl.130 – 175) was the wife of Liu Hong (刘鸿), Prince Xiao of Bohai (勃海孝王, a great-grandson of Emperor Zhang of Han), and the biological mother of Liu Zuan who became Emperor Zhi of Han.

She entered Liu Hong's harem by her talent as an entertainer. Besides Liu Zuan, Lady Chen was not recorded to have any other children.

In February 145, Emperor Chong of Han died, and as there was no heir to emperors An and Shun, the eight year old (by East Asian reckoning) Liu Zuan ascended the throne. The following year, Liu Zuan was poisoned by the general Liang Ji. General Liang was also the reason why Lady Chen was not given the status of either an empress, a royal wife or an empress dowager. She was widowed in August or September 147, when Liu Hong died.

However, on 24 November 175, Emperor Ling of Han honoured the mother of Emperor Chong by bestowing on her the title "noble lady of Xian hill", while Lady Chen was entitled "concubine of Prince Xiao of Bohai" (勃海孝王妃). Nothing further was known of Lady Chen after this.
