= Yuan She =

2nd-century Chinese Han dynasty official

Yuan She (袁赦; fl.150 – 179) was a Chinese court eunuch and politician during the Eastern Han dynasty. He rose to power during the reign of Emperor Huan of Han (r. 146–168), for his involvement in the downfall of the powerful consort kin Liang Ji. He continued to wield influence during the reign of Emperor Huan's successor, Emperor Ling (r. 168–189).

== Background ==
According to Book of the Later Han, Yuan She was a clansman of Yuan Wei, an uncle of Yuan Shao and Yuan Shu, and held the position of zhong changshi (中常侍; "Central Regular Attendant"). Using his influence within the imperial harem, Yuan She helped to support Yuan Wei and Yuan Feng (Shao's and Shu's father), who were then high-ranking officials in the Eastern Han court. In turn, Wei and Feng also used their influence to help Yuan She. Thus, the Yuan clan of Ru'nan grew powerful and influential; their power and influence were greater than other clans of the era.

== Life ==
In August 159, Liang Ji's younger sister Empress Liang Nüying died. Liang, in order to continue to control Emperor Huan, had adopted his wife's beautiful cousin (a stepdaughter of her uncle Liang Ji (梁紀—note different character despite same pronunciation)), Deng Mengnü, as his own daughter, changing her family name to Liang. He and his wife Sun Shou gave Liang Mengnü to Emperor Huan as an imperial consort, and, after Empress Liang's death, hoped to have her eventually created empress. To completely control her, Liang Ji planned to have her mother, Lady Xuan (宣), killed, and in fact sent assassins against her, but the assassination was foiled by Yuan She, who was a neighbor of Lady Xuan. Lady Xuan then reported the assassination attempt to Emperor Huan, who was greatly angered. He entered into a conspiracy with eunuchs Tang Heng, Zuo Guan, Shan Chao (單超), Xu Huang (徐璜), and Ju Yuan (具瑗) to overthrow Liang. Eventually, the plot was successful.

In May 179, official Yang Qiu (阳球) submitted a formal petition against eunuchs Wang Fu and Cao Jie, and Grand Commandant Duan Jiong (段颎) who had aligned himself with Wang and Cao. Yuan She, fellow Attendant Chunyu Deng (淳于登) and other eunuchs were also implicated. While Yuan She, Cao Jie and Chunyu Deng survived after a stint in prison, Wang Fu and Duan Jiong eventually died in prison.
