= Deng Mengnü =

Empress of China from 159 to 165

Deng Mengnü (鄧猛女) (died 165), also briefly known as Liang Mengnü (梁猛女) then as Bo Mengnü (薄猛女), was an empress during the Eastern Han dynasty. She was the second wife of Emperor Huan.

== Family background ==
Deng Mengnü's father Deng Xiang (鄧香) was a low level official in the imperial administration. (It is not clear under which emperor(s) he served.) He was a cousin of Empress Deng Sui and therefore a grandson of the statesman Deng Yu. Deng Mengnü's mother was named Xuan (宣). Deng Xiang died early, and after his death, Lady Xuan remarried Liang Ji (梁紀—note different character than the Liang Ji referenced below), an uncle of Sun Shou (孫壽), the wife of the powerful official Liang Ji (梁冀), who dominated the political scene throughout the reigns of Emperor Huan and his two predecessors, Emperors Chong and Zhi, as the brother of the regent Empress Dowager Liang.

== Marriage to Emperor Huan ==
After Lady Xuan remarried, Deng Mengnü lived for a while with her mother and her stepfather. Because she was beautiful, Liang Ji and Sun Shou had offered her to Emperor Huan to be an imperial consort—and adopted her and changed her family name to Liang. After the death of Liang Ji's sister Empress Liang Nüying in August 159, Liang Ji was hopeful to continue to use her to control Emperor Huan and hoped that she would become empress. To completely control her, Liang Ji planned to have her mother, Lady Xuan, killed, and in fact sent assassins against her, but the assassination was foiled by the powerful eunuch Yuan She (袁赦), a neighbor of Lady Xuan. This set in motion a series of events that led to Liang Ji's downfall, as Emperor Huan, angry about the assassination attempt, formed a conspiracy with five powerful eunuchs and overthrew Liang in a coup d'etat later in September 159. The Liang and Sun clans were slaughtered.

After the fall of the Liang clan, on 14 September 159, Emperor Huan created then-Consort Liang empress, but disliked her family name, and so ordered her family name be changed to Bo (薄). Only later did the emperor find out that she was actually Deng Xiang's daughter, and therefore had her original family name of Deng restored. A number of her uncles and cousins were promoted to important positions but not given much real power.

== Downfall and death ==
For a while, Emperor Huan greatly favored the beautiful Empress Deng. However, his affection was not undivided, and he had a large number of other favorites, including Consorts Guo and Tian. Empress Deng became very arrogant and jealous, and she and Consort Guo engaged in a series of false accusations against each other. On 27 March 165, Emperor Huan decided to rid himself of Empress Deng and ordered her deposed and imprisoned. She died in anger and depression. Her relatives who had been promoted when she had become empress were removed from their positions, and her uncles Deng Wanshi (鄧萬世) and Deng Hui (鄧會) were executed.

Chinese royalty
Preceded by Empress Liang Nüying	Empress of the Eastern Han dynasty 159–165	Succeeded by Empress Dou Miao
