= Yan Ming (empress dowager) =

Chinese Han dynasty empress dowager (died 152)

Yan Ming (匽明) (died 25 May 152), formally Empress Xiaochong (孝崇皇后) was an empress dowager during the Eastern Han dynasty—even though she was never empress and, for that matter, was never married to an emperor. She became empress dowager because her teenage son Liu Zhi became emperor (as Emperor Huan) in August 146.

Yan Ming was a concubine of Liu Yi (劉翼), the Marquess of Liwu. After Marquess Yi died, her son Zhi, as the oldest son of the marquess, inherited the title. After the young Emperor Zhi was poisoned by the powerful official Liang Ji in July 146, the 13-year-old Marquess Zhi, because he was betrothed to Liang Ji's younger sister Liang Nüying, was selected by Liang to inherit the throne. After he became emperor, he initially only honored his mother with the title of an imperial consort (after posthumously honoring his father as an emperor). After the regent Empress Dowager Liang (Liang Ji's other sister) died in April 150, Emperor Huan honored Consort Yan with an empress title, effectively making her the empress dowager. He gave her nine counties as her fief. She died in May 152.
