= Emperor Gao =

Emperor Gao may refer to:

- Emperor Gaozu of Han (256–195 BC)
- Cao Teng (died 150s), eunuch who received the title Emperor Gao of Wei posthumously
- Fu Deng (343–394), emperor of Former Qin
- Emperor Gao of Southern Qi (427–482)
