= Li Gu (Han dynasty) =

Eastern Han dynasty scholar and official (died c.December 147)

Li Gu (李固; 94 - December 147 or January 148), courtesy name Zijian (子堅), was an Eastern Han dynasty scholar and official. Twice, he opposed Liang Ji, a powerful consort kin, on the issue of succession of the imperial throne, after the deaths of Emperors Chong and Zhi.

== Background ==
Li Gu was from Hanzhong Commandery; his father Li He (李郃) served as sikong and situ under Emperor An and Emperor Shun respectively.

== Service under Emperor Chong ==
On 27 September 144, after Emperor Chong ascended the throne, Li Gu was appointed Grand Commandant. However, Emperor Chong died the next year at the age of two. After Emperor Chong's death, Li Gu advocated that Liu Suan, Prince of Qinghe, should ascend the throne, citing his age and virtue. However, Liang Ji ignored him and made Liu Zuan (the future Emperor Zhi, then the son of Prince of Le'an Liu Hong) emperor instead.

== Service under Emperor Zhi ==
When Emperor Zhi ascended the throne in March 145, Li Gu retained his post as Grand Commandant. However, Liang Ji soon became apprehensive of Emperor Zhi's intelligence. On 26 July 146, he had his underlings poison a bowl of pastry soup and had it given to the emperor. After the young emperor consumed the soup, he quickly suffered great pain, and he summoned Li immediately and also requested for water, believing that water would save him. However, Liang, who was by the emperor's side, immediately ordered that the emperor not be given any water; the young emperor immediately died. Li cried bitterly upon Emperor Zhi's death and advocated a full investigation, but Liang was able to have the investigation efforts suppressed. After Emperor Zhi's death, Li Gu again advocated that Liu Suan be made emperor; this time, Li Gu's proposal received widespread support. Previously, Liu Suan had been rude during an audience with Cao Teng, causing Cao to hold a grudge. Upon hearing the impasse between Liang Ji and Li Gu, Cao Teng went to Liang Ji's residence during one night and persuaded Liang to make his brother-in-law Liu Zhi, Marquess of Liwu, emperor in order to preserve his wealth and power. On 29 July, Li Gu was dismissed as Grand Commandant.

== Under Emperor Huan ==
Liu Zhi was made emperor in August 146. In c.December 147, Liu Wen (刘文) and Liu Wei (刘鲔) hatched a plot to put Liu Suan on the throne. While the plot was unsuccessful and Liu Wen was executed together with Liu Wei, Liu Suan was still impeached. He was demoted to a marquis and exiled to Guiyang; Liu Suan committed suicide. Liang Ji took the opportunity to frame Li Gu and Du Qiao (杜喬) as part of the conspiracy. Ultimately, both Li and Du died in prison.
