= Beautiful Lady Yu (Han dynasty) =

Chinese Han dynasty concubine (died 179)

Beautiful Lady Yu (Chinese: 虞美人; died 179; personal name unknown) held the rank of "beautiful lady" (美人) in the harem of Emperor Shun of Han. She was the biological mother of Liu Sheng (刘生), Grand Princess of Wuyang (舞阳长公主) and Liu Bing, Emperor Chong of Han (汉冲帝刘炳). According to Xu Hanzhi, Lady Yu's father Yu Shi (Chinese: 虞诗) and grandfather Yu Heng (Chinese: 虞衡) were both Han officials.

Lady Yu was chosen to be a concubine at the age of 13 (by East Asian reckoning), on the basis of belonging to a "good family", and her mother's clan members were all honoured and favoured people. Later on she gave birth to her daughter, Liu Sheng. In 138, her daughter Liu Sheng was conferred the title "Grand Princess of Wuyang".

In 143, Lady Yu gave birth to Emperor Shun's only son: Liu Bing. In September 144, following the death of Emperor Shun, Liu Bing became emperor. In February of the following year, Liu Bing died.

When an Emperor ascended the throne, the mother of that Emperor would usually receive an honourable title. Yet, this was not the case for Beautiful Lady Yu. According to Book of the Later Han, due to General Liang Ji's violent seizure of power, Lady Yu's clan feared Liang Ji doing them harm and avoided court positions and honours, and was thus considered simply a "grand family".

On 24 November 175, Emperor Ling of Han honoured Lady Yu as mother of Emperor Chong by bestowing her the higher harem rank "noble lady of Xian hill" (宪园贵人), together with bestowing the title "concubine of Prince Xiao of Bohai" on Lady Chen, mother of Emperor Zhi of Han. Following this, Lady Yu was also known as "Noble Lady Yu of Xianling" (宪陵贵人虞氏). In 179, Lady Yu died, having outlived both her husband and son by more than 30 years.
