= Empress Deng =

Empress Deng may refer to:

- Empress Deng Sui (鄧綏) (81–121), Chinese empress of the Han Dynasty, married to Emperor He
- Empress Deng Mengnü (鄧猛女) (died 165), Chinese empress of the Han Dynasty, married to Emperor Huan
