= Yan Ming =

Yan Ming is the name of:

- Yan Ming (empress dowager) (died 152), empress dowager of the Han dynasty
- Yen Ming (born 1949), Taiwanese general
- Yan Ming (swimmer) (born 1969), Chinese swimmer
- Shi Yan Ming, Shaolin warrior monk
- Yan Ming (painter), (1917–2005, a Chinese painter and art educator
