= Emperor Huan of Han =

Emperor of Han China from 146 to 168

Emperor Huan of Han 漢桓帝

Emperor of the Han dynasty
- Reign: 1 August 146 – 25 January 168
- Predecessor: Emperor Zhi
- Successor: Emperor Ling
- Born: 132
- Died: 25 January 168 (aged 35–36)
- Consorts: Empress Yixian; Empress Deng; Empress Huansi
- Issue: Princess Yang'an; Princess Yingyin; Princess Yangdi
Full name
- Family name: Liu (劉); Given name: Zhi (志)
Era dates
- Jianhe (建和) 147–149; Heping (和平) 150; Yuanjia (元嘉) 151–153; Yongxing (永興) 153–154; Yongshou (永壽) 155–158; Yanxi (延熹) 158–167; Yongkang (永康) 167
Posthumous name
- Xiaohuan (孝桓)
Temple name
- Weizong (威宗; later revoked in 190)
- Dynasty: Han dynasty
- Father: Liu Yi
- Mother: Empress Xiaochong

Emperor Huan of Han
- Traditional Chinese: 漢桓帝
- Simplified Chinese: 汉桓帝
Transcriptions
Standard Mandarin
- Hanyu Pinyin: Hàn Huán Dì
- Wade–Giles: Han Huan-ti

Emperor Huan of Han (Chinese: 漢桓帝; pinyin: Hàn Huán Dì; Wade–Giles: Han Huan-ti; 132 – 25 January 168) was the 27th emperor of the Han dynasty after he was enthroned by the Empress Dowager and her brother Liang Ji on 1 August 146. He was a great-grandson of Emperor Zhang. He was the 11th emperor of the Eastern Han dynasty.

After Emperor Zhi was poisoned to death by the powerful official Liang Ji in July 146, Liang Ji persuaded his sister, the regent Empress Dowager Liang to make the 14-year-old Liu Zhi, the Marquess of Liwu, who was betrothed to their sister Liang Nüying (梁女瑩), emperor. As the years went by, Emperor Huan, offended by Liang Ji's autocratic and violent nature, became determined to eliminate the Liang family with the help of eunuchs. Emperor Huan succeeded in removing Liang Ji in September 159 but this only caused an increase in the influence of these eunuchs over all aspects of the government. Corruption during this period had reached a boiling point. In 166, university students rose up in protest against the government and called on Emperor Huan to eliminate all corrupt officials. Instead of listening, Emperor Huan ordered the arrest of all students involved. Emperor Huan has largely been viewed as an emperor who might have had some intelligence but lacked wisdom in governing his empire; and his reign contributed greatly to the downfall of the Eastern Han dynasty.

Hou Hanshu (Book of the Later Han) recounts that one Roman envoy (perhaps sent by emperor Marcus Aurelius) reached the Chinese capital Luoyang in 166 and was greeted by Emperor Huan.

Emperor Huan died in January 168 after reigning for more than 21 years; he was 36. He was succeeded by Emperor Ling of Han.

== Family background and ascension ==
Liu Zhi was born in 132, to Liu Yi (劉翼), the Marquess of Liwu, and his concubine Yan Ming (匽明).

Liu Yi was the son of Liu Kai (劉開), Prince Xiao of Hejian (and therefore a grandson of Emperor Zhang), and he had initially been made the Prince of Pingyuan as the heir of his cousin Liu Sheng (劉勝) by Empress Dowager Deng Sui, the regent for Emperor An, who was impressed with his abilities. That led to rumors that Empress Deng was looking to replace Emperor An, Prince Yi's cousin, with Prince Yi. After Empress Dowager Deng died in April 121, Emperor An, bearing a grudge against Prince Yi, demoted him to the rank of Marquess of Duxiang and exiled him to his father's principality. During the reign of Emperor Shun (Emperor An's son), Prince Kai requested that he be allowed to give Liwu County, part of his principality, to his son, and Emperor Shun permitted it. Marquess Yi thus became the Marquess of Liwu.

By 146, Liu Zhi had inherited his father's title and was betrothed to Liang Nüying, the younger sister of the regent Empress Dowager Liang Na and her violent and corrupt brother, Grand Marshal Liang Ji. In July that year, Liang Ji, bearing a grudge against the eight-year-old Emperor Zhi for calling him an "arrogant general," murdered the young emperor by poison. The officials under Li Gu largely favored Emperor Zhi's first cousin Liu Suan (劉蒜) the Prince of Qinghe, who was described as a solemn and proper man. Prince Suan's age was not given in history, though he appeared to be an adult by this time. However, Liang Ji was hesitant to yield authority to an able emperor. Because Marquess Zhi was betrothed to his sister and relatively young, Liang Ji felt that he could control him and insisted on making him emperor. After persuasion from Cao Teng, Liang Ji affirmed his determination; Marquess Zhi took the throne in August that year as emperor.

== Early reign under regency of Empress Dowager Liang and Liang Ji's shadow ==
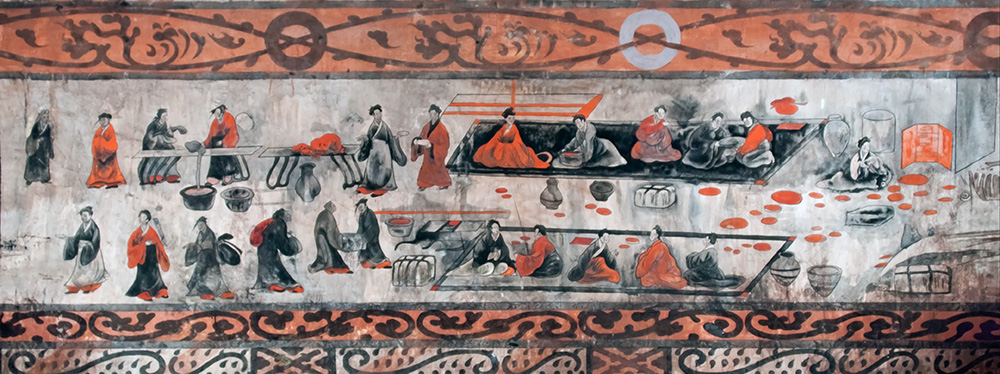
An Eastern Han (25-220 AD) mural of a banquet scene, from the Dahuting Tomb (Chinese: 打虎亭汉墓, Pinyin: Dahuting Han mu) of Zhengzhou, Henan province, China

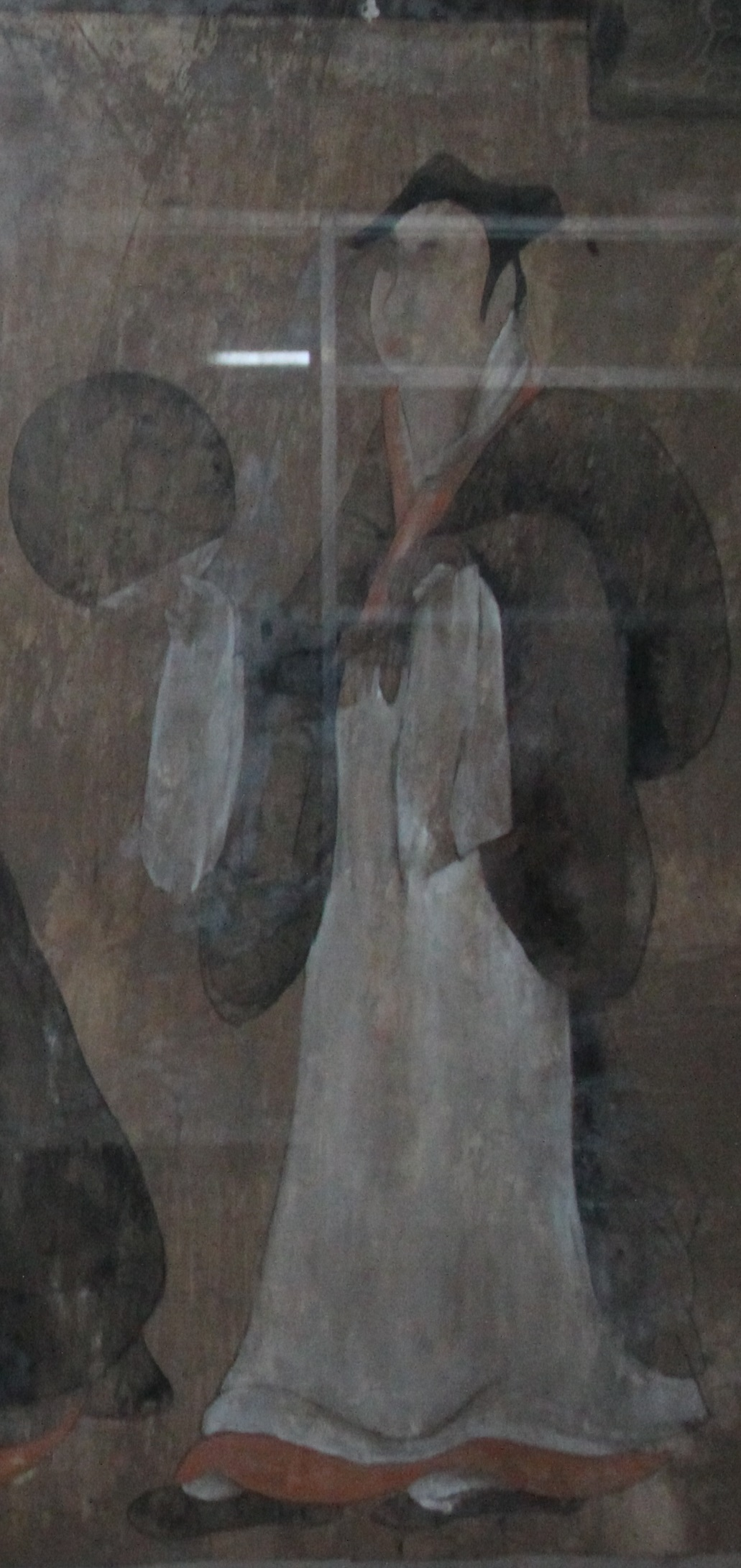
Mural of a woman dressed in Hanfu, from the Dahuting Tomb (Chinese: 打虎亭汉墓, Pinyin: Dahuting Han mu) of the late Eastern Han dynasty (25–220 AD), located in Zhengzhou, Henan province, China

After Emperor Huan's ascension at age 14, Empress Dowager Liang continued to serve as regent. However, her brother Liang Ji came to take on more and more control, even more than the empress dowager. Emperor Huan posthumously honored his grandfather and father as emperors but, because the empress dowager was regent, did not honor his mother Yan Ming as an empress dowager; rather, she was given the title of an imperial consort. His father's wife, Lady Ma, was belatedly honored as an imperial consort as well in 148. In 147, he married Empress Dowager Liang and Liang Ji's sister Liang Nüying, making her empress. It appeared that, while the Liangs were in control, Emperor Huan was not a complete puppet. Instead, as a sign of bad things to come, he trusted eunuchs in his decision-making.

That same year, Liang Ji, in conjunction with the eunuchs Tang Heng (唐衡) and Zuo Guan (左悺), but with Emperor Huan's clear approval, falsely accused the honest officials Li Gu (李固) and Du Qiao (杜喬) of conspiring to overthrow Emperor Huan and replace him with Prince Suan. Li and Du were executed, while Prince Suan was demoted to marquess status and committed suicide.

In 150, Empress Dowager Liang announced that she was retiring and returning imperial authority to Emperor Huan. Later that year, she died. Emperor Huan then honored his mother as an empress dowager. However, without his sister to curb his power, Liang Ji came to be even more powerful than before. His violence and corruption increased and he stamped out all dissent with threats of death. He even threw his humble and peace-loving brother Liang Buyi (梁不疑) out of the government.

In May 152, Empress Dowager Yan died. Because Emperor Huan had inherited the throne through a collateral line, he was not permitted by customs to be the mourner. Instead, his brother Liu Shi (劉石) the Prince of Pingyuan served as chief mourner.

In 153, the first major public confrontation between an official and a powerful eunuch occurred—foreshadowing many to come. Zhu Mu (朱穆), the governor of Ji Province (modern central and northern Hebei) had found out that the father of the powerful eunuch Zhao Zhong (趙忠) had been improperly buried in a jade vest, an honor that was reserved to imperial princes. He ordered an investigation: Zhao's father was exhumed and the jade vest was stripped away, an act that angered Zhao and Emperor Huan. Zhu was not only removed from his post but was sentenced to hard labor.

== Coup d'état against Liang Ji ==
As the years went by, Emperor Huan became increasingly disgruntled at Liang Ji's control of the government and was also angered by Empress Liang's behavior. Because of her position as Empress Dowager Liang and Liang Ji's sister, Empress Liang was wasteful in her luxurious living, far exceeding any past empress, and was exceedingly jealous. She did not have a son and, because she did not want any other imperial consorts to have sons, she would find some way to murder pregnant consorts. Emperor Huan did not dare to react to her due to Liang Ji's power, but rarely had sexual relations with her. In 159, angry and depressed that she had lost her husband's favor, Empress Liang died.

This death started a chain of events that led to Liang Ji's downfall later that year. Liang, in order to continue to control Emperor Huan, had adopted his wife's beautiful cousin (the stepdaughter of her uncle Liang Ji (梁紀—note different characters despite the same pronunciation)), Deng Mengnü (鄧猛女), as his own daughter, changing her family name to Liang. He and Sun gave Liang Mengnü to Emperor Huan as an imperial consort. After Empress Liang's death, they hoped that she would eventually be made empress. To completely control her, Liang Ji planned to have her mother, Lady Xuan (宣), killed: he sent assassins against her but the assassination was foiled by the powerful eunuch Yuan She (袁赦), a neighbor of Lady Xuan.

Lady Xuan reported the assassination attempt to Emperor Huan, who was greatly angered. He entered into a conspiracy with eunuchs Tang Heng, Zuo Guan, Shan Chao (單超), Xu Huang (徐璜), and Ju Yuan (具瑗) to overthrow Liang—sealing the oath by biting open Dan's arm and swearing by his blood. Liang Ji had some suspicions about what Emperor Huan and the eunuchs were up to, and began an investigation. The five eunuchs quickly reacted. They had Emperor Huan openly announce that he was taking back power from Liang Ji and mobilized the imperial guards to defend the palace against a counterattack by Liang. They surrounded Liang's house and forced him to surrender. Liang and Sun were unable to respond and committed suicide. The entire Liang and Sun clans (except for Liang Ji's brothers Liang Buyi and Liang Meng [梁蒙], who had previously already died) were arrested and slaughtered. A large number of officials were executed or deposed for close association with Liang—so many that the government was almost unable to function for some time. Liang and Sun's properties were confiscated by the imperial treasury, which allowed the taxes to be reduced by 50% for one year. The people greatly celebrated Liang Ji's death.

== Late reign: empowerment of the eunuchs ==
After Liang Ji's death, Emperor Huan made Liang Mengnü empress. However, he disliked her family name and therefore ordered her to take the family name Bo (薄). He later found out that her original family name was actually Deng, and therefore had her family name restored.

The people had great expectations for Emperor Huan's administration after the death of Liang Ji. However, having been unable to overthrow Liang Ji without the five eunuchs' help, Emperor Huan greatly rewarded them, making them and several other eunuchs who participated in the coup d'état marquesses and further giving them governmental posts that conferred tremendous power. Further, the five eunuch-marquesses openly engaged in massive corruption and became extremely wealthy with Emperor Huan's approval. A song written about the four remaining eunuch-marquesses following Dan's death described them in this way:

Zuo can reverse heaven's decision. Ju sits by himself without match. Xu is a lying wolf. Tang's power is as prevalent as the falling rain.

Emperor Huan himself was also corrupt and unwilling to accept any criticism. In 159, when the honest county magistrate Li Yun (李雲) submitted a petition urging him to curb the power of the eunuchs, Emperor Huan was deeply offended that he included the phrase, "Is the emperor turning blind?"; despite intercessions by a number of officials and even some fair-minded eunuchs, had Li and his friend Du Zhong (杜眾) both executed.

In 161, apparently in reaction to spending due to renewed Qiang rebellions and new agrarian revolts, Emperor Huan issued an edict offering minor offices for sale—including imperial guard officer positions. This practice set a bad precedent and would become even more prevalent and problematic under Emperor Huan's successor, Emperor Ling. While Emperor Huan actually was able to find competent generals to suppress the rebellions or to persuade the rebels to surrender, the rampant corruption came to cause new rebellions as soon as the old ones are quelled.

In 165, perhaps finally fed up with the eunuchs' excess, Emperor Huan demoted Ju, the only eunuch remaining of the original five. Several other corrupt eunuchs were also demoted or deposed. However, soon thereafter, the eunuchs' powers were restored again. For the rest of Emperor Huan's reign, there would be a cycle of rise and fall of power of the eunuchs after conflicts with officials, but inexorably the eunuchs would return, becoming more powerful than before. This cycle would continue until the reign of Emperor Ling, when an army led by the regent He Jin and the powerful noblemen Yuan Shao and Yuan Shu marched into the imperial capitol of Luoyang and massacred the eunuchs.

Later that year, apparently tired of Empress Deng and sick of her disputes with a favorite consort of his, Consort Guo, Emperor Huan deposed and imprisoned her. She died in anger, and several of her family members were executed. He wanted to make another consort, Tian Sheng (田聖) empress, but officials opposed this on the basis that she was of lowly birth. They recommended that he make Consort Dou Miao (竇妙), the daughter of Dou Wu (竇武), a Confucian scholar and a descendant of Dou Rong (竇融), who had contributed much to the establishment of the Eastern Han dynasty, empress. Even though he did not favor Consort Dou, Emperor Huan gave in to pressure and made her empress.

In 166, a major public confrontation between university students and eunuchs evolved into a major incident. The governor of the capital province (modern western Henan and central Shaanxi), Li Ying, had arrested and executed a fortuneteller named Zhang Cheng (張成), who had had his son kill a man, having predicted that a general pardon was coming. Li was arrested and 200 some university students signed a petition requesting his release. This further angered Emperor Huan, who had the students arrested. Only after about a year and Dou Wu's intercession were Li and the university students released, but all of them had their citizenship rights stripped. This incident was later known as the first Disaster of Partisan Prohibition.

In January 168, Emperor Huan died without a son. Empress Dou, jealous of how he favored Consort Tian, had her immediately put to death. She conducted a survey among the members of the imperial clan and decided on the 11-year-old Liu Hong (劉宏), the Marquess of Jieduting, who then ascended the throne as Emperor Ling. On 9 March 168, Emperor Huan was buried and given the temple name "Weizong", but this temple name was later revoked in 190 during the reign of Emperor Xian of Han.

== Era names ==
- Jianhe (建和) 147–149
- Heping (和平) 150
- Yuanjia (元嘉) 151–153
- Yongxing (永興) 153–154
- Yongshou (永壽) 155–158
- Yanxi (延熹) 158–167
- Yongkang (永康) 167

== Family ==
- Empress Yixian, of the Liang clan (懿獻皇后 梁氏; d. 159), personal name Nüying (女瑩)
- Empress, of the Deng clan (皇后 鄧氏; d. 165), personal name Mengnü (猛女)
- Empress Huansi, of the Dou clan of Fufeng (桓思皇后 扶風竇氏; d. 172), personal name Miao (妙)
- Guiren, of the Guo clan (贵人郭氏)
- Guiren, of the Tian clan (贵人田氏), personal name Sheng (圣)
- Guiren, of the Feng clan (贵人冯氏)
- Lady Kou, of the Kou clan (寇氏), granddaughter of Kou Rong (寇荣)
- Unknown
  - Princess Yang'an (陽安公主), personal name Hua (華), first daughter
    - Married Fu Wan, Marquis Buqi (伏完; d. 209)
  - Princess Yingyin (潁陰公主), personal name Jian (堅), second daughter
  - Princess Yangdi (陽翟公主), personal name Xiu (修), third daughter

== See also ==
- Family tree of the Han dynasty

Emperor Huan of Han House of Liu Born: 132 Died: 25 January 168
Regnal titles
| Preceded by Emperor Zhi of Han | Emperor of China; Eastern Han; 146–168 with Empress Dowager Liang (146–150) | Succeeded by Emperor Ling of Han |
