= 296 =

296 in various calendars
Gregorian calendar	296; CCXCVI
Ab urbe condita	1049
Assyrian calendar	5046
Balinese saka calendar	217–218
Bengali calendar	−298 – −297
Berber calendar	1246
Buddhist calendar	840
Burmese calendar	−342
Byzantine calendar	5804–5805
Chinese calendar	乙卯年 (Wood Rabbit); 2993 or 2786 — to — 丙辰年 (Fire Dragon); 2994 or 2787
Coptic calendar	12–13
Discordian calendar	1462
Ethiopian calendar	288–289
Hebrew calendar	4056–4057
- Hindu calendars
Vikram Samvat	352–353
Shaka Samvat	217–218
Kali Yuga	3396–3397
Holocene calendar	10296
Iranian calendar	326 BP – 325 BP
Islamic calendar	336 BH – 335 BH
Javanese calendar	176–177
Julian calendar	296; CCXCVI
Korean calendar	2629
Minguo calendar	1616 before ROC 民前1616年
Nanakshahi calendar	−1172
Seleucid era	607/608 AG
Thai solar calendar	838–839
Tibetan calendar	阴木兔年 (female Wood-Rabbit); 422 or 41 or −731 — to — 阳火龙年 (male Fire-Dragon); 423 or 42 or −730

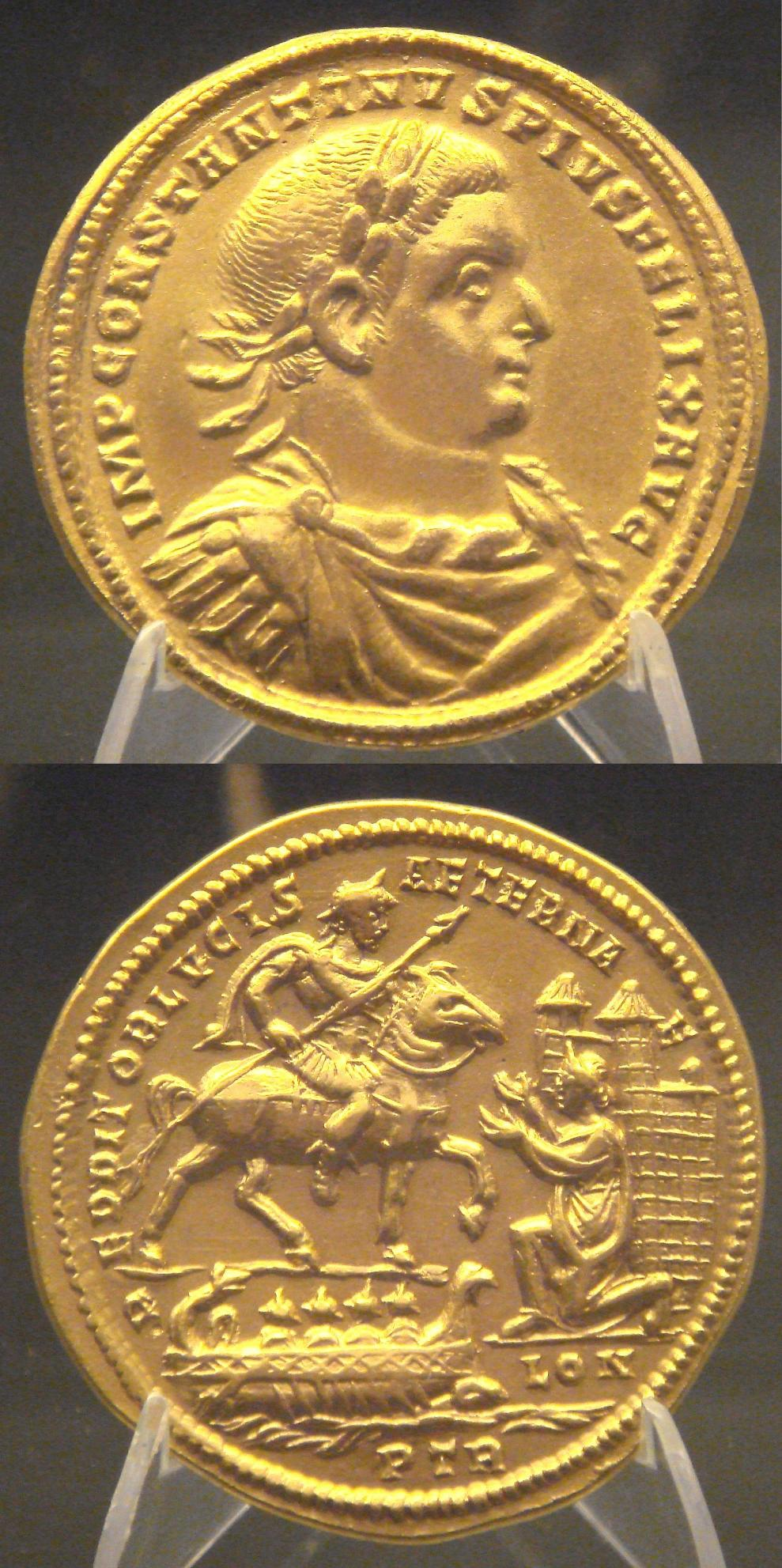
Medal of Constantius Chlorus capturing Londinium (inscribed as LON)

Year 296 (CCXCVI) was a leap year starting on Wednesday of the Julian calendar. In the Roman Empire, it was known as the Year of the Consulship of Diocletian and Constantius (or, less frequently, year 1049 Ab urbe condita). The denomination 296 for this year has been used since the early medieval period, when the Anno Domini calendar era became the prevalent method in Europe for naming years.

== Events ==
=== By place ===
==== Roman Empire ====
- In this or the previous year, Caesar Constantius I assembles two invasion fleets with the intent of overthrowing the usurper Allectus, who is based in Britain. The first is under the command of Asclepiodotus, Maximian's long-serving Praetorian Prefect. Asclepiodotus sails from the mouth of the Seine, and lands near the Isle of Wight, where his forces defeat Allectus in Hampshire. Allectus is killed in the fighting. Constantius leaves Boulogne with his fleet, and occupies London, where he slaughters some of Allectus' Frankish mercenaries. With this victory, the Romano-British regime first established by Carausius is overthrown, and Britain is re-incorporated into the rest of the empire.
- Having supervised the Rhine frontier during Constantius' invasion of Britain, Maximian then marches into Spain, where he fights Frankish pirates. He then crosses into North Africa to contend with the rebellion of the Quinquegentiani.
- The Persian king Narseh invades Roman-held Upper Mesopotamia and Arsacid western Armenia, the latter territory being under the leadership of the pro-Roman king Tiridates III. With only a small army, Caesar Galerius fights three holding actions against Narseh's army in Mesopotamia. Somewhere in the open plains between Carrhae and Callinicum, Galerius' army suffers a defeat against the Persian army, which is both more numerous and contains superior numbers of high-quality cavalry. Nevertheless, Galerius succeeds in blunting the Persian offensive.

=== By topic ===
==== Religion ====
- April 22 – Pope Caius dies after a 13-year reign and is succeeded by Marcellinus as the 29th pope of Rome.

== Births ==
- Yu Bing (or Jijian), Chinese politician (d. 344)

== Deaths ==
- April 22 – Caius, bishop of Rome
- Allectus, Roman treasurer and usurper-emperor
- Guo Huai (or Yuhuang), Chinese noblewoman (b. 237)
