= Yan Ji =

Empress of China from 108 to 125

Yan Ji (閻姬) (died 28 February 126), formally Empress Ansi (安思皇后, literally "the peaceful and deep-thinking empress"), was an empress during the Eastern Han dynasty. Her husband was Emperor An. She was known for her conspiratorial and nepotistic behavior, both as empress and (briefly) as empress dowager regent. She ruled as Regent for seven months during the rule of Marquess of Beixiang in 125. However, her plan, along with her brothers, to hold on to power for a long time ultimately resulted in failure and the deaths of her clan members.

== Family background and marriage to Emperor An ==
Yan Ji's father Yan Chang (閻暢) was the son of Yan Zhang (閻章), an official under Emperor Ming whose two sisters were imperial consorts, and who was described as a capable official whose promotion however was halted by Emperor Ming, who did not want to appear nepotistic.

When Lady Yan was young, she was described as intelligent and beautiful. In 114, she was selected as an imperial consort for Emperor An, who was 20, and she quickly became his favorite. On 1 June 115, he created her empress—even though she was also described as jealous, to the extent that that year, she poisoned Consort Li, who had given birth to a son of the emperor, Liu Bao (劉保).

== As empress ==
During most of Emperor An's reign, he was mostly overshadowed by his regent, Empress Dowager Deng Sui. But after Empress Dowager Deng died in April 121, he asserted his authority and put a number of his trusted individuals in power to displace the late empress dowager's family, many of whom were forced to commit suicide. Among these entrusted individuals were Empress Yan's brothers Yan Xian (閻顯), Yan Jing (閻景), Yan Yao (閻耀), and Yan Yan (閻晏), all were powerful, particularly Xian who was both reliable and powerful. Empress Yan herself influenced her husband in his actions greatly, much to the detriment of the empire. It is said that from the beginning she was trying to gain power after her husband's death and tried to eliminate the opposition, establish her own clan in key positions and collect a bunch of officials, generals and eunuchs close to the emperor. In 124, she falsely accused nine-year-old Prince Bao, who had been made crown prince because he was Emperor An's only son, of crimes, and Emperor An deposed Prince Bao and created him Prince of Jiyin.

== As empress dowager regent ==
In April 125, Emperor An died suddenly while on a trip to Wancheng (宛城, in modern Nanyang, Henan). The empress, who was with him, did not immediately announce his death, but conspired with her brothers and the powerful eunuchs Jiang Jing (江京) and Fan Feng (樊豐), to find an alternative to Prince Bao, who would otherwise appear to be his father's natural successor. They chose a young cousin of Emperor An's, Liu Yi (劉懿) the Marquess of Beixiang, and Marquess Yi was made emperor over Prince Bao. (They had made this decision because the Marquess of Beixiang was young and easy to control.)

The Yans, working with Jiang, quickly moved to grab more power. They falsely accused some other of Emperor An's trusted individuals—including his stepuncle Geng Bao (耿寶), his wet nurse Wang Sheng (王聖), and the eunuch Fan of crimes. Fan was executed, while Geng and Wang were exiled with their families. The Yans were firmly in power—or so they thought. A major illness to the young emperor would foil their plans.

The eunuch Sun Cheng (孫程), believing that Prince Bao was the proper emperor and knowing that the young emperor was ill, formed a conspiracy with Prince Bao's assistant Changxing Qu (長興渠) and a number of other eunuchs with intent to restore Prince Bao. When, late in the year, the young emperor died, Empress Yan and her brothers again did not announce his death but summoned the sons of the imperial princes to the capital, intending to again bypass Prince Bao. Several days later, Sun and 18 of his fellow eunuchs made a surprise attack on the palace, killing Jiang and several eunuchs in his party and forcing his colleague Li Run (李閏) to lead their coup d'état. They welcomed Prince Bao to the palace and declared him emperor (as Emperor Shun). For several days, the eunuchs' forces battled with the empress dowager's forces, finally defeating the empress dowager and her brothers. The Yan clan was slaughtered, while Empress Dowager Yan was confined to her palace.

== Death ==
Some officials advised Emperor Shun to depose Empress Dowager Yan from her title of empress dowager. After some consideration, Emperor Shun declined such action and continued to treat her with the honors due an empress dowager. However, perhaps in fear and in mourning for her family, she died in February 126 and was buried with her husband Emperor An.

Chinese royalty
Preceded by Empress Deng Sui	Empress of Eastern Han Dynasty; 108–125	Succeeded by Empress Liang Na
