= 237 =

237 in various calendars
| Gregorian calendar | 237; CCXXXVII |
| Ab urbe condita | 990 |
| Assyrian calendar | 4987 |
| Balinese saka calendar | 158–159 |
| Bengali calendar | −357 – −356 |
| Berber calendar | 1187 |
| Buddhist calendar | 781 |
| Burmese calendar | −401 |
| Byzantine calendar | 5745–5746 |
| Chinese calendar | 丙辰年 (Fire Dragon); 2934 or 2727 — to — 丁巳年 (Fire Snake); 2935 or 2728 |
| Coptic calendar | −47 – −46 |
| Discordian calendar | 1403 |
| Ethiopian calendar | 229–230 |
| Hebrew calendar | 3997–3998 |
- Hindu calendars
| Vikram Samvat | 293–294 |
| Shaka Samvat | 158–159 |
| Kali Yuga | 3337–3338 |
| Holocene calendar | 10237 |
| Iranian calendar | 385 BP – 384 BP |
| Islamic calendar | 397 BH – 396 BH |
| Javanese calendar | 115–116 |
| Julian calendar | 237; CCXXXVII |
| Korean calendar | 2570 |
| Minguo calendar | 1675 before ROC 民前1675年 |
| Nanakshahi calendar | −1231 |
| Seleucid era | 548/549 AG |
| Thai solar calendar | 779–780 |
| Tibetan calendar | མེ་ཕོ་འབྲུག་ལོ་ (male Fire-Dragon); 363 or −18 or −790 — to — མེ་མོ་སྦྲུལ་ལོ་ (female Fire-Snake); 364 or −17 or −789 |

Year 237 (CCXXXVII) was a common year starting on Sunday of the Julian calendar. At the time, it was known as the Year of the Consulship of Perpetuus and Felix (or, less frequently, year 990 Ab urbe condita). The denomination 237 for this year has been used since the early medieval period, when the Anno Domini calendar era became the prevalent method in Europe for naming years.

== Events ==
=== By place ===
==== Roman Empire ====
- Emperor Maximinus Thrax campaigns on the rivers Danube and Rhine in Germania, defeating the Alemanni, and never visits Rome. He is accepted by the Roman Senate, but taxes the rich aristocracy heavily, and engenders such hostility among them, that they plot against him. He had a road rebuilt in what is now the Golan Heights, between 236 and 237.

==== Persia ====
- King Ardashir I of Persia renews his attacks on the Roman province of Mesopotamia.

=== By topic ===
==== Religion ====
- Patriarch Eugenius I succeeds Patriarch Castinus as Patriarch of Constantinople.
- Saint Babylas becomes Patriarch of Antioch.

== Births ==
- Alexander of Constantinople, patriarch of Constantinople
- Guo Huai (or Yuhuang), Chinese noblewoman (d. 296)
- Philip II (the Younger), Roman emperor (d. 249)

== Deaths ==
- February 7 – Chen Qun, Chinese official and politician
- September 22 – Mingdao (or Mao), Chinese empress
- Wu Yi (or Ziyuan), Chinese general of the Shu Han state
- Zhang (or Jing'ai), Chinese empress of the Shu Han state
