= AD 94 =

AD 94 in various calendars
- Gregorian calendar: AD 94; XCIV
- Ab urbe condita: 847
- Assyrian calendar: 4844
- Balinese saka calendar: 15–16
- Bengali calendar: −500 – −499
- Berber calendar: 1044
- Buddhist calendar: 638
- Burmese calendar: −544
- Byzantine calendar: 5602–5603
- Chinese calendar: 癸巳年 (Water Snake); 2791 or 2584 — to — 甲午年 (Wood Horse); 2792 or 2585
- Coptic calendar: −190 – −189
- Discordian calendar: 1260
- Ethiopian calendar: 86–87
- Hebrew calendar: 3854–3855
- Hindu calendars
- Vikram Samvat: 150–151
- Shaka Samvat: 15–16
- Kali Yuga: 3194–3195
- Holocene calendar: 10094
- Iranian calendar: 528 BP – 527 BP
- Islamic calendar: 544 BH – 543 BH
- Javanese calendar: N/A
- Julian calendar: AD 94; XCIV
- Korean calendar: 2427
- Minguo calendar: 1818 before ROC 民前1818年
- Nanakshahi calendar: −1374
- Seleucid era: 405/406 AG
- Thai solar calendar: 636–637
- Tibetan calendar: ཆུ་མོ་སྦྲུལ་ལོ་ (female Water-Snake); 220 or −161 or −933 — to — ཤིང་ཕོ་རྟ་ལོ་ (male Wood-Horse); 221 or −160 or −932

AD 94 (XCIV) was a common year starting on Wednesday of the Julian calendar. At the time, it was known as the Year of the Consulship of Calpurnius and Magius (or, less frequently, year 847 Ab urbe condita). The denomination AD 94 for this year has been used since the early medieval period, when the Anno Domini calendar era became the prevalent method in Europe for naming years.

== Events ==
=== By place ===
==== Roman Empire ====
- Emperor Domitian rebuilds and rededicates the Curia Julia (meeting place of the Roman Senate), which had burned down in AD 64.
- Domitian banishes all Stoic philosophers from Rome.

==== Asia ====
- The Chinese General Ban Chao completes his conquest of the Tarim Basin by taking Yānqi, which is located on the strategic Silk Road.

=== By topic ===
==== Literature ====
- The Roman poet Publius Papinius Statius retires to Naples from Rome (approximate date).

== Births ==
- An of Han, Chinese emperor (d. 125)

== Deaths ==
- Guo Gong [zh], Eastern Han Dynasty official
