= Excavations at Heerlen (1971) =

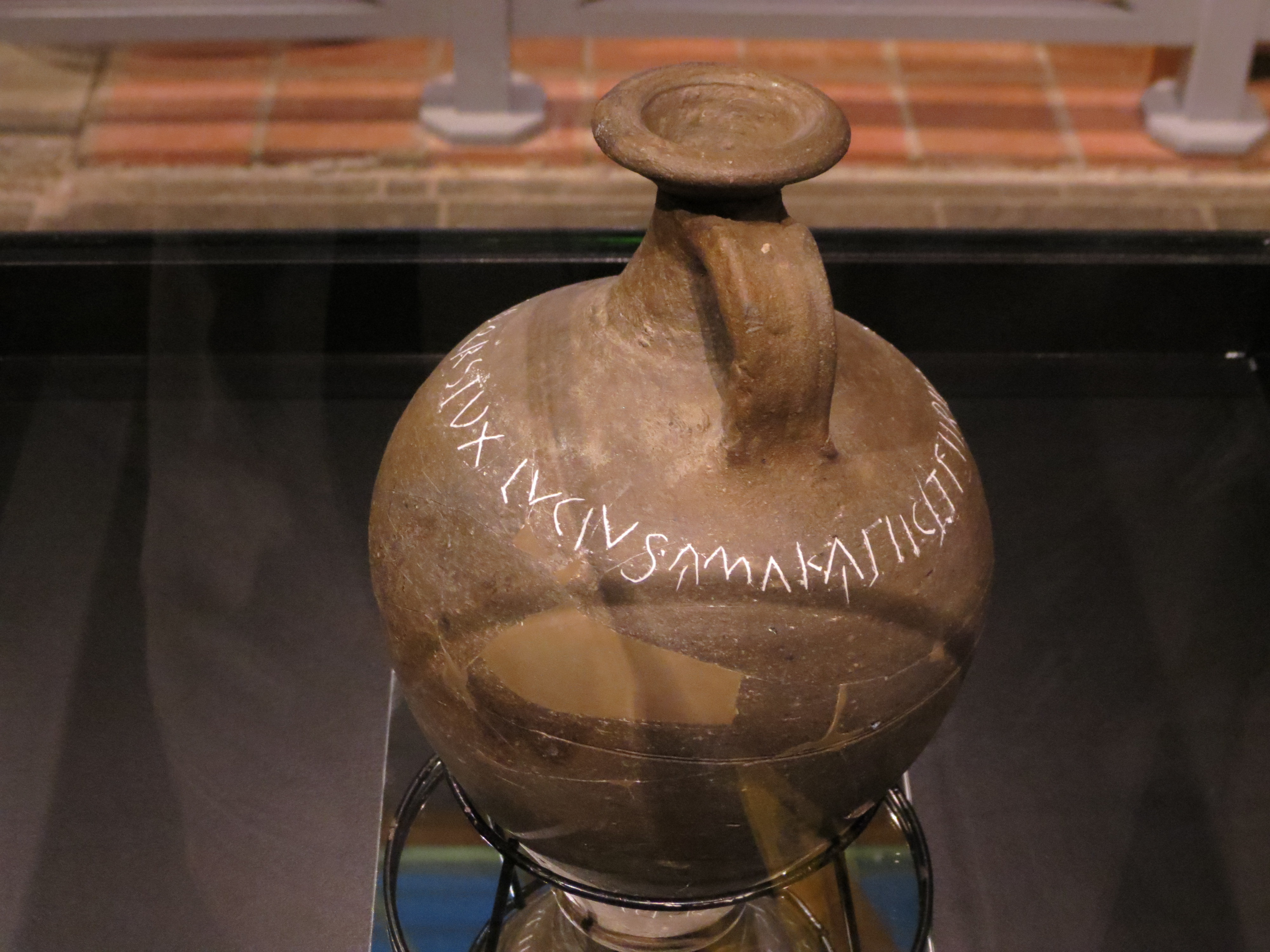
The jar of Lucius Ferenius

In 1971, an archaeological excavation was undertaken on the Putgraaf in the city of Heerlen. During the excavation, an exploded Roman kiln was discovered. Between the pieces of the kiln some fragments of a jar were found with the life story of the potter, Lucius Ferenius, written on them. The name Fer(e)nius suggests that this Lucius was born in Feresne, sometime between AD 125 and AD 150.

The jar was made for his wife Amaka. Because Lucius was superstitious he scratched the Latin alphabet in the jar to fend off demons and bad tidings.

== Text on the jar ==
"Lucius Fernius has made for Amaka (this jar)/Lucius, in his birthplace called Metcius, has made this jar for her in his business/(I,) Lucius, devote (this jar) to the good god of Fere(s)ne (?), my birthplace"
