= Thamel (martyr) =

Chtistian saint

Saint Thamel and Companions

Martyr
- Died: 125
- Venerated in: Roman Catholic Church
- Canonized: Pre-congregation
- Feast: 4 September

Saint Thamel and companions (died 125 AD) are a group of 2nd century Christian martyrs. Thamel was a priest for a pagan god who was converted to Christianity. He was killed with his sister during the persecutions of Christians under the Roman emperor Hadrian.
