= Emperor Zhi of Han =

Emperor of the Han dynasty from 145 to 146

Emperor Zhi of Han 漢質帝

Emperor of the Han dynasty
- Reign: 6 March 145 – 26 July 146
- Predecessor: Emperor Chong of Han
- Successor: Emperor Huan of Han
- Born: 138
- Died: 26 July 146 (aged 7-8)
Names
- Family name: Liu (劉; liú); Given name: Zuan (纘, zǔan)
Posthumous name
- Full: Xiaozhi (孝質, xiào zhì) (lit. 'filial and upright'); Short: Zhí (質, zhì) (lit. 'upright')
- Father: Liu Hong
- Mother: Consort Chen

Emperor Zhi of Han (simplified Chinese: 漢质帝; traditional Chinese: 漢質帝;; pinyin: Hàn Zhì Dì; Wade–Giles: Han Chih-ti; 138 – 26 July 146) was the 26th emperor of the Chinese Han dynasty. He was a great-great-grandson of Emperor Zhang. His reign was dominated by Liang Ji, the brother of Empress Dowager Liang, who eventually poisoned the young emperor. He was the 10th emperor of the Eastern Han dynasty.

Emperor Zhi ascended the throne when he was seven when his third cousin, two-year-old Emperor Chong died, and although he was still a child, Emperor Zhi was remarkably intelligent and he knew and was offended by the immense power Liang Ji had over the government—leading to him once commenting that Liang Ji was "an arrogant general." This act of defiance angered Liang Ji, who proceeded to poison the emperor. Emperor Zhi was only eight when he died.

== Family background and accession to the throne ==
Liu Zuan, the future Emperor Zhi was born to Liu Hong (劉鴻), the Prince of Le'an, and his wife Consort Chen, in 138. (Eventually, after his son became emperor, Prince Hong would be moved from his very humid and small principality of Le'an to the larger and drier principality of Bohai.) Prince Hong was a great-grandson of Emperor Zhang. Other than these facts, virtually nothing else is known about Prince Hong or his wife.

In February 145, when the two-year-old Emperor Chong died, he had no close male relative to inherit his throne. His stepmother Empress Dowager Liang (the wife of Emperor Shun) therefore summoned two of his third cousins—Liu Suan (劉蒜), the Prince of Qinghe, and Liu Zuan, then seven-years-old, to the capital, to examine them as potential heir to the throne. (Prince Suan and Zuan were first cousins of each other, through their grandfather Liu Chong (劉寵), Prince Yi of Le'an.) Liu Suan was apparently an adult (although history did not record his age) and was described as solemn and proper, and the officials largely favored him. However, Empress Dowager Liang's autocratic and violent brother Liang Ji wanted a younger emperor so that he could remain in absolute control longer, and he persuaded Empress Dowager Liang to make the seven-year-old Zuan as emperor. To avoid having a person without an official title becoming emperor directly, he was first created the Marquess of Jianping, and then the same day he ascended the throne as Emperor Zhi.

== Brief reign ==
Empress Dowager Liang served as Emperor Zhi's regent, and while she overly trusted her brother Liang Ji, who was violent and corrupt, she herself was diligent and interested in governing the country well—in particular, entrusting much of the important matters to the honest official Li Gu (李固, who was Grand Commandant). For example, the agrarian rebellions that started during Emperors Shun and Chong's reigns were largely quelled in 145, after she selected the right generals to lead the armies. She also encouraged the young scholars from over the empire to come to the capital Luoyang to study at the national university.

Emperor Zhi, as young as he was, was keenly aware of how much Liang Ji was abusing power (but befitting of a young child, not aware of how Liang Ji also had the power to do him harm), and on one occasion, at an imperial gathering, he blinked at Liang Ji and referred to him as "an arrogant general." Liang Ji became angry and concerned. In July 146, he had his underlings poison a bowl of pastry soup and had it given to the emperor. After the young emperor consumed the soup, he quickly suffered great pain, and he summoned Li immediately and also requested for water, believing that water would save him. However, Liang, who was by the emperor's side, immediately ordered that the emperor not be given any water, and the young emperor immediately died. Li advocated a full investigation, but Liang was able to have the investigation efforts suppressed.

After Emperor Zhi's death, Liang Ji, under pressure by the key officials, was forced to summon a meeting of the officials to decide whom to enthrone as the new emperor. The officials were again largely in favor of Prince Suan, but Liang Ji was still concerned about how he would be difficult to control. Rather, he persuaded Empress Dowager Liang (after he was persuaded by Cao Teng himself) to make the 14-year-old Liu Zhi (劉志), the Marquess of Liwu, a great-grandson of Emperor Zhang, to whom Liang Ji's younger sister Liang Nüying (梁女瑩) was betrothed, emperor (as Emperor Huan).

Long after Emperor Zhi's death, in November 175, Emperor Ling bestowed on Emperor Zhi's mother Lady Chen the honorific title of Princess Xiao of Bohai, in recognition of her status as mother of an emperor.

== Era name ==
- Benchu (本初) 146

== See also ==
1. Family tree of the Han dynasty

Emperor Zhi of Han House of Liu Born: 138 Died: 146
Regnal titles
Preceded by Emperor Chong of Han	Emperor of China; Eastern Han; 145–146 with Empress Dowager Liang (145–146)	Succeeded by Emperor Huan of Han
