= Marquess of Beixiang =

Emperor of the Han dynasty in 125

Emperor Shao of Han 漢少帝

Emperor of the Han dynasty
- Reign: 18 May 125 – 10 December 125
- Predecessor: Emperor An
- Successor: Emperor Shun
- Died: 10 December 125
Names
- Family name: Liu (劉; liú); Given name: Yi (懿, yì)
Posthumous name
- Beixiang Hou (北鄉侯; literary meaning: Marquess of Beixiang)
- House: House of Liu
- Father: Liu Shou (a son of Liu Da)

The Marquess of Beixiang (simplified Chinese: 北乡侯; traditional Chinese: 北鄉侯; pinyin: Běixiāng Hóu; Wade–Giles: Pei-hsiang-hou; died 10 December 125), personal name Liu Yi, also referred to as Emperor Shao (少帝, literally "young emperor"), was the 23rd emperor of the Chinese Han dynasty. He was selected to succeed Emperor An after Emperor An's sudden death in April 125, but died soon after he became emperor and a eunuch coup in favour of Emperor Shun overthrew the regime of Empress Dowager Yan, who put him on the throne.

No historical records indicate his age, but later references to him imply that he was young, perhaps a child or young teenager. As his reign was short and considered at least somewhat illegitimate, he is often omitted from the official list of emperors.

== Family background ==
It is not known when Liu Yi was born—other than he was described as young at the time he ascended the throne on 18 May 125 and therefore must have been born late in the reign of Emperor An. (Note: The Annals of the Later Han by Yuan Hong recorded that when Emperor An grew gravely ill on 28 Apr 125, he ordered sons of the Princes of Jibei and Hejian between the ages of 7 and 14 (by East Asian reckoning) to be brought to the capital Luoyang. It is likely (though not certain) that Liu Yi fulfilled this age requirement.) His father was Liu Shou (劉壽; died 26 April 120), Prince Hui of Jibei, who was the fifth son of Emperor Zhang, making him Emperor An's cousin. Liu Shou's mother, Consort Shen, held the rank of guiren. Nothing is known about Liu Yi's mother. He was likely created a marquess in 120, when five brothers of his oldest brother, Liu Deng (劉登; died 8 August 135), Prince Jie of Jibei, were created marquesses.

== Brief reign and posthumous developments ==
Empress Dowager Yan's decision was supported by other powerful people trusted by Emperor An—his stepuncle Geng Bao (耿寶), the eunuchs Jiang Jing (江京) and Fan Feng (樊豐), and his wet nurse Wang Sheng (王聖). Soon, however, Empress Yan and her brother Yan Xian (閻顯) wanted to have full control of power, and they falsely accused Fan, Wang, and Geng of crimes. Fan was executed, while Wang and Geng, along with their families, were exiled. The Yan brothers became the most powerful officials in the capital Luoyang and ruled autocratically.

Late in the year, however, the young emperor grew gravely ill, and eunuchs loyal to Prince Bao, led by Sun Cheng (孫程), formed a conspiracy to overthrow the Yans. As soon as the emperor died, the eunuchs overthrew the Yans in a coup d'état and made Prince Bao emperor (as Emperor Shun). The Yans were slaughtered, except for Empress Dowager Yan, who was however rendered powerless.

Emperor Shun, recognizing that the former Marquess of Beixiang was young and not complicit in Empress Yan's plot, did not posthumously dishonor him or carry out reprisals against his family, but nor did he recognize his predecessor as a legitimate emperor. Later in the year, he had the former emperor buried with the honors of an imperial prince—in other words, higher than of his previous title of marquess but lower than that of an emperor. No official posthumous name was recorded for this young emperor.

In 136, about ten years after his death, the empire experienced several natural disasters and unusual occurrences. Emperor Shun thought that these occurrences were caused by Liu Yi's spirit as he felt that he had been unjustly treated, having once been emperor and yet was buried with the honors of an imperial prince. The emperor then discussed with court officials about giving Liu Yi a posthumous name, as well as recognizing his rule as emperor. Initially, the court agreed with Emperor Shun. However, official Zhou Ju (周举) objected and his arguments were eventually supported by 70 others. In the end, Emperor Shun agreed with Zhou.

== See also ==
- Family tree of the Han dynasty

== Notes ==
Emperor Shao House of Liu Died: 125
Regnal titles
Preceded by Emperor An of Han	Emperor of China; Eastern Han; 125 with Empress Dowager Yan Ji (125)	Succeeded by Emperor Shun of Han
