= Liang Nüying =

Empress of China from 147 to 159

Liang Nüying (梁女瑩) (died 9 August 159), formally Empress Yixian (懿獻皇后, literally "the meek and wise empress") was an empress during the Eastern Han dynasty. She was Emperor Huan's first wife.

== Family background ==
It is not known when Liang Nüying was born, but what is known is that in her young age she was accustomed to an honored position as a daughter of the Grand Marshal Liang Shang (梁商) and a younger sister of Empress Liang Na, Emperor Shun's wife, and later regent to his son Emperor Chong, and two successors from collateral lines, Emperors Zhi and Huan. Indeed, it was because she was betrothed to Emperor Huan (who was then the Marquess of Liwu) that her elder brother, the powerful Liang Ji, insisted on making him emperor in August 146 after poisoning Emperor Zhi. After Emperor Huan became emperor, he married her in 147 and created her empress on 30 September.

== As empress ==
As an empress, Empress Liang was somewhat in the shadow of her sister, the empress dowager, and brother, and not much is known about her. Traditional history indicates that because of her honored position as the empress dowager's sister, initially, Emperor Huan did not dare to have any other favorite consorts. She was described as so luxurious in her living that her expenses far exceeded the empresses of the past. After her sister died in April 150, she began to lose Emperor Huan's favor, but she continued to be greatly jealous. As she was sonless, she did not want any imperial consorts to have sons—so she would have them killed if they became pregnant. With Liang Ji effectively in control of government, Emperor Huan did not dare to respond, but he would rarely have sexual relations with her. Empress Liang died in anger on August 9, 159 and was buried with the honors of an empress. On 28 August of that same year, she was buried in Yiling.

Later that year, Emperor Huan, in conjunction with eunuchs, overthrew Liang Ji in a coup d'état. The Liang clan was slaughtered. On September 14, Empress Liang's tomb was retitled a tomb of an "Honored Lady", effectively meaning that she was posthumously demoted. On the same day, Deng Mengnü was made empress.

== Notes ==
Chinese royalty
Preceded by Empress Liang Na	Empress of the Eastern Han dynasty 147–159	Succeeded by Empress Deng Mengnü
