= Emperor Chong of Han =

Emperor of the Han dynasty from 144 to 145

Emperor Chong of Han 漢沖帝

Emperor of the Han dynasty
- Reign: 20 September 144 – 15 February 145
- Predecessor: Emperor Shun of Han
- Successor: Emperor Zhi of Han
- Born: 143
- Died: 15 February 145 (aged 2)
- Father: Emperor Shun of Han
- Mother: Beautiful Lady Yu

Emperor Chong of Han (Chinese: 漢冲帝; pinyin: Hàn Chōng Dì; Wade–Giles: Han Ch'ung-ti; 143 – 15 February 145) was the 25th emperor of the Chinese Han dynasty and the ninth emperor of the Eastern Han period.

Emperor Chong was the only son of Emperor Shun. He ascended the throne at the age of one and reigned less than six months. During his reign, Empress Dowager Liang and her brother Liang Ji presided over all government affairs. While the empress dowager herself appeared to be open-minded and honest, she overly trusted her corrupt brother, and this led to corruptions and as a result the peasants suffered greatly.

Emperor Chong died in February 145. He was just two years old.

== Family background ==
Then-Prince Bing was born to Emperor Shun and his concubine Consort Yu in 143. Virtually nothing is known about his mother, other than that she entered the palace when she was 12 (but it is not known what year that was), and that she was also the mother of Prince Bing's sister Princess Sheng. He was Emperor Shun's only son.

On 3 June 144, Emperor Shun, apparently already ill, created Prince Bing crown prince. Less than four months later, Emperor Shun died, and Crown Prince Bing, at the age of one, ascended the throne as Emperor Chong.

== Brief reign ==
As Emperor Chong was only a toddler, Emperor Shun's wife Empress Dowager Liang served as regent. She apparently was fairly diligent and open-minded in her duties, but her major fault was in trusting her corrupt and violent brother Liang Ji (梁冀), who was the most powerful official in the administration. (While Emperor Shun was still alive, Liang Ji was already the most powerful official, but the near-absolute power that he wielded became even more evident after Emperor Shun's death.) When the capable official Huangfu Gui (皇甫規; uncle of Huangfu Song) submitted a report that, in circumspect language, suggested that Liang Ji and his brother Liang Buyi (梁不疑) be humble and live more thriftly, Liang removed Huangfu from his post and tried several times to falsely accuse him of capital crimes.

During Emperor Chong's reign, agrarian revolts, which were already a problem late in Emperor Shun's reign, became more serious—and even the tomb of Emperor Shun was dug up by bandits.

In February 145, Emperor Chong died. Empress Dowager Liang was initially going to keep Emperor Chong's death a secret until she would decide on who the successor would be, but she listened to the Grand Commandant Li Gu (李固) and decided to properly and publicly announce Emperor Chong's death immediately. She summoned Emperor Chong's third cousins Liu Suan (劉蒜), the Prince of Qinghe, and Liu Zuan (劉纘), the son of Liu Hong (劉鴻), Prince Xiao of Bohai, to the capital, and considered the two of them. Liu Suan was apparently an adult (although history did not record his age) and was described as solemn and proper, and the officials largely favored him. However, Liang Ji wanted a younger emperor so that he could remain in absolute control longer, and he persuaded Empress Dowager Liang to make the seven-year-old Prince Zuan as emperor (as Emperor Zhi).

Emperor Chong, having died in young childhood, was buried in his father's tomb complex in order to save costs.

Long after Emperor Chong's death, in November 175, Emperor Ling bestowed on Emperor Chong's mother Consort Yu a more elevated imperial consort title (貴人, Guiren) than her original title (美人, Meiren) in recognition of her status as an emperor's mother.

== Era name ==
- Yongxi (永熹) 145

== See also ==
- Family tree of the Han dynasty

Emperor Chong of Han House of Liu Born: 143 Died: 145
Regnal titles
Preceded by Emperor Shun of Han	Emperor of China; Eastern Han; 144–145 with Empress Dowager Liang (144–145)	Succeeded by Emperor Zhi of Han
