= Liang Na =

Empress of China from 132 to 144

Liang Na (Chinese: 梁妠; 116 – 6 April 150), formally Empress Shunlie (順烈皇后, literally "the kind and achieving empress"), was an empress during the Han dynasty. Her husband was Emperor Shun of Han. She later served as regent for his son Emperor Chong, and the two subsequent emperors from collateral lines, Emperor Zhi and Emperor Huan. As empress dowager and regent, she appeared to be diligent and honest, but she overly trusted her violent and corrupt elder brother Liang Ji, whose autocratic nature would eventually draw a coup d'etat from Emperor Huan after Empress Dowager Liang's death, leading to the destruction of the Liang clan.

== Family background and marriage to Emperor Shun ==
The future empress was born in 116. Her father was Liang Shang (梁商)—an honest official who was also the Marquess of Chengshi, being a grandson of a brother of Consort Liang, the mother of Emperor He. Liang Na was described as diligent in handcraft and sewing, as well as history and the Confucian classics, as a child.

In 128, when she was 12, both she and her paternal aunt were selected to be Emperor Shun's imperial consorts. (Emperor Shun was 13.) She was a favored consort, but she often declined offers to have sexual relations with the emperor, reasoning that an emperor needs to be equitable and give opportunities to other consorts. Emperor Shun became greatly impressed with her. In 131, when he was considering creating an empress, he initially considered asking the gods for guidance and drawing lots from between four of his favorites, but after officials discouraged him from drawing lots, he considered Consort Liang most virtuous, so created her empress on 2 March 132.

== As empress ==
As empress, Empress Liang continued to show humility, and did not interfere significantly in her husband's administration. Emperor Shun, however, became very trustful of her relatives, and her father Liang Shang was quickly promoted repeatedly, eventually becoming Grand Marshal (大將軍). Liang Shang was a mild-mannered and honest man, although lacking in abilities. He did, however, trust other capable and honest officials, and during his term of office, the political scene was a lot cleaner than before. Eventually, Empress Liang's brothers Liang Ji and Liang Buyi (梁不疑) also became key officials.

On 22 September 141, Liang Shang died, and Emperor Shun, in an ill-advised move, gave his position to Liang Ji. Liang Ji would, as the years go by, stamp out all dissent and position himself as the most powerful individual in the imperial administration.

Throughout her husband's reign, Empress Liang continued to be a favorite of Emperor Shun's, but she never bore a son for him. Emperor Shun was only known to have had one son—Liu Bing (劉炳), born to Consort Yu in 143. On 3 June 144, as Emperor Shun was growing ill, he created the toddler crown prince. He died four months later, and Crown Prince Bing succeeded to the throne as Emperor Chong. Empress Liang, now empress dowager, served as regent.

== As regent for Emperors Chong and Zhi ==
Empress Dowager Liang appeared to be diligent in governing over the empire, and she trusted several key officials with integrity to advise her on important affairs. However, she also trusted her brother Liang Ji greatly, and Liang used her position to further consolidate his own. However, she was willing to go against his advice on a number of occasions, and she, for example, protected the honest official Li Gu (李固) against Liang Ji's demands to execute Li, in 145.

In 145, the young Emperor Chong died, and in an effort to be open to people, Empress Dowager Liang announced his death openly immediately. She summoned the young emperor's third cousins Liu Suan (劉蒜), the Prince of Qinghe, and Liu Zuan (劉纘), the son of Liu Hong (劉鴻) the Prince of Bohai, to the capital Luoyang, to be examined as potential successors. Prince Suan was probably an adult, and was described as solemn and proper, and the key officials largely favored him. However, Liang Ji wanted a young emperor whom he could control, so he convinced Empress Dowager Liang to make the seven-year-old Liu Zuan emperor (as Emperor Zhi). Empress Dowager Liang continued to serve as regent.

In 146, after the young Emperor Zhi showed signs that he was already cognizant of Liang Ji's corruption and offended Liang Ji by openly calling him "an arrogant general," Liang Ji had him poisoned, apparently without Empress Dowager Liang's knowledge. The key officials again largely favored Prince Suan as successor, but Liang Ji again vetoed their wishes, and instead persuaded Empress Dowager Liang to make the 14-year-old Liu Zhi (劉志), the Marquess of Liwu, who was betrothed to Empress Dowager Liang's and Liang Ji's sister Liang Nüying, emperor (as Emperor Huan). Empress Dowager Liang continued to serve as regent.

== As regent for Emperor Huan ==
Serving as regent for Emperor Huan, Empress Dowager Liang largely continued her policies as before, but Liang Ji became ever more powerful and was able to finally pushed Li Gu out of the government in 146 after Li Gu had publicly opposed Emperor Huan's ascension.

In 147, Emperor Huan married Empress Dowager Liang's sister Liang Nüying and created her empress. Later that year, Liang Ji falsely accused Li Gu and Prince Suan of a conspiracy to start a military rebellion. Prince Suan was demoted to be Marquess of Weishi, and he committed suicide. Li, and another key official who opposed Liang Ji, Du Qiao (杜喬), were executed.

In 150, Empress Dowager Liang announced that she was stepping down as regent and returning imperial authorities to Emperor Huan. She died later that year and was buried with her husband Emperor Shun. However, Liang Ji remained in effective control of government and now, without his sister to curb his power, became ever more violent and corrupt. This eventually drew a reaction from Emperor Huan, who conspired with eunuchs to overthrow Liang Ji in a coup d'état in 159. The Liang clan was slaughtered.

Chinese royalty
Preceded by Empress Yan Ji	Empress of the Eastern Han dynasty 132–144	Succeeded by Empress Liang Nüying
