= Liang Ji =

Chinese general and politician (died 159)

Liang Ji (梁冀) (died 9 September 159), courtesy name Bozhuo (伯卓), was a Chinese military general and politician. As a powerful consort kin, he dominated government in the 150s together with his younger sister, Empress Liang Na. After his sister's death, Liang Ji was overthrown in a coup d'etat by Emperor Huan, with the support of the eunuch faction, in 159. The Liang clan and the clan of his wife, Sun Shou (孫壽), were slaughtered.

== Family background and early career ==
Liang Ji was the oldest son of Liang Shang (梁商) -- an honest official who was also the Marquess of Chengshi, being a grandson of a brother of Consort Liang, the mother of Emperor He. Liang Ji's younger sister, Liang Na, became Emperor Shun's consort in 128, and was created empress in March 132.

After Empress Liang became empress, Emperor Shun entrusted her father Liang Shang with great power. In 133, Emperor Shun offered to create Liang Ji a marquess, but Liang Shang humbly declined that honor on his son's behalf. In 135, Emperor Shun made Liang Shang Grand Marshal (大將軍), over his own repeated objection. Liang Shang was a mild-mannered and honest man, although lacking in abilities. He did, however, trust other capable and honest officials, and during his term of office, the political scene was a lot cleaner than before.

It was probably during this time that Liang Ji married his wife, Sun Shou. She was often described by traditional historians as a temptress who was able to induce Liang to be devoted to her sexually (although somewhat contradictorily, the traditional historians also described both heterosexual and homosexual affairs for Liang Ji, including one with his servant Qin Gong (秦宮), who was described as having a ménage à trois-type relationship with both Liang and Sun), and she was described to have invented a good number of sexually explicit clothing items.

In 136, because both his father and his brother-in-law trusted him, Liang Ji was made the mayor of the capital Luoyang. However, what neither of them knew was that Liang Ji was violent, corrupt, and treacherous. On one occasion, one of Liang Shang's trusted advisors, Lü Fang (呂放), the magistrate for Luoyang County (one of the subdivisions of the Luoyang municipality of which Liang Ji was mayor) warned Liang Shang about Liang Ji's corruption, and Liang Shang rebuked his son. Liang Ji then sent assassins out and killed Lü, but appeared to be so mournful about it that he recommended Lü's brother Lü Yu (呂禹) to succeed Lü Fang and permitted Lü Yu to arrest and execute all who were suspected in the assassination, leading to the deaths of hundreds of people.

== As Grand Marshal under Emperor Shun ==
In September 141, Liang Shang died. Liang Ji inherited his march. Later that year, Emperor Shun made him Grand Marshal, succeeding his father, and made his younger brother Liang Buyi (梁不疑) -- an honest and humble man, relative to his brother—mayor of Luoyang. As Grand Marshal, Liang Ji gradually eliminated the opposition and consolidated his power, often through violent, illicit, or treacherous means. For example, in 142, because he was criticized by the lower-level official Zhang Gang (張綱), he intentionally made Zhang the governor of Guanglin Commandery, at that time overrun by agrarian rebels, believing that Zhang would surely be killed by these rebels. (However, Zhang was eventually able to convince these rebels to surrender, and governed the commandery with efficiency and honesty.)

== As Grand Marshal under Emperors Chong and Zhi ==
Emperor Shun died in 144. His infant son Liu Bing (劉炳), by Consort Yu, became emperor (as Emperor Chong), and Empress Liang became empress dowager and regent. Empress Dowager Liang appeared to be diligent in governing over the empire, and she trusted several key officials with integrity to advise her on important affairs. However, she also trusted her brother Liang Ji greatly, and Liang Ji used her position to further consolidate his own. However, she was willing to go against his advice on a number of occasions, and she, for example, protected the honest official Li Gu (李固) against Liang Ji's demands to execute Li, in 145.

In 145, the young Emperor Chong died, and in an effort to be open to people, Empress Dowager Liang announced his death openly immediately. She summoned the young emperor's third cousins Liu Suan (劉蒜), the Prince of Qinghe, and Liu Zuan (劉纘), the son of Liu Hong (劉鴻) the Prince of Le'an, to the capital Luoyang, to be examined as potential successors. Prince Suan was probably an adult, and was described as solemn and proper, and the key officials largely favored him. However, Liang Ji wanted a young emperor whom he could control, so he convinced Empress Dowager Liang to make the seven-year-old Liu Zuan emperor (as Emperor Zhi). Empress Dowager Liang continued to serve as regent.

In 146, after the young Emperor Zhi showed signs that he was already cognizant of Liang Ji's corruption and offended Liang Ji by openly calling him "an arrogant general," Liang Ji had him poisoned, apparently without Empress Dowager Liang's knowledge. The key officials again largely favored Prince Suan as successor, but Liang Ji again vetoed their wishes, and instead persuaded Empress Dowager Liang to make the 14-year-old Liu Zhi (劉志), the Marquess of Liwu, who was betrothed to Empress Dowager Liang and Liang Ji's sister Liang Nüying, emperor (as Emperor Huan). Empress Dowager Liang continued to serve as regent.

== As Grand Marshal under Emperor Huan ==
It was really during Emperor Huan's reign that Liang Ji exercised near absolute power. He tried to ensure that power by also establishing relationships with Emperor Huan's trusted eunuchs, often presenting them with great gifts, but also making show of force to anyone (eunuchs or non-eunuch officials) that he could cause the death of anyone he wanted to kill. In 147, for example, in conjunction with eunuchs Tang Heng (唐衡) and Zuo Guan (左悺), he falsely accused Li Gu and Prince Suan of a conspiracy to start a military rebellion. Prince Suan was demoted to be Marquess of Weishi, and he committed suicide. Li, and another key official who opposed Liang Ji, Du Qiao (杜喬), were executed.

Also in 147, Emperor Huan married Liang Ji's sister Liang Nüying and created her empress.

In April 150, Empress Dowager Liang died, shortly after she announced that she was returning imperial powers to Emperor Huan. However, Liang Ji remained in effective control of the government—perhaps even more so than before, with his sister now no longer curbing his power. His wife Sun was created the Lady of Xiangcheng, with a march rivaling his own large one. Both of them built luxurious mansions with huge gardens in the rear, and collected innumerable precious items. Liang, further, forced commoners into slavery, and also falsely accused a large number of rich people of crimes, in order to execute them and confiscate their properties.

In 151, Liang made a critical error that nearly caused him great harm—he, in contravention to imperial regulations not to bring weapons into the imperial meeting hall, strided in with his sword. The imperial secretary Zhang Ling (張陵) rebuked him and moved to impeach him, and while Liang, who was actually still in control of the government, was not impeached, he was greatly embarrassed and penalized by surrendering one year's worth of salary. Because Zhang had been recommended by his brother Liang Buyi, Liang Ji became suspicious of his brother and removed him as the mayor of Luoyang—giving that post to his own son, the 15-year-old Liang Yin (梁胤), who was utterly incompetent. Liang Ji further expelled Liang Buyi's friends out of the government.

Liang Ji, apparently unsatisfied with his nearly limitless position, took a number of actions that were directly analogous to what Wang Mang had done prior to his usurpation of the Han throne—including ordering officials to recommend to Emperor Huan to enlarge his march to be as large as the Duke of Zhou; to grant him special dispensation, unprecedented since Xiao He, to walk slowly into the imperial meeting hall, to carry his sword into the meeting hall, to keep his shoes on, and to have the master of ceremonies refer to him only by rank and title, not by name; to grant him rewards as great as those granted to Huo Guang; and for him to be seated above all other imperial officials. This brought expectation that Liang might be interested in usurping the throne eventually. All who dared to criticize him invited certain death.

== Loss of power and death ==
In August 159, Liang Ji's younger sister Empress Liang Nüying died—which, oddly enough, set in motion a chain of events that would end Liang Ji's power. Liang, in order to continue to control Emperor Huan, had adopted his wife's beautiful cousin (a stepdaughter of her uncle Liang Ji (梁紀—note different character despite same pronunciation)), Deng Mengnü, as his own daughter, changing her family name to Liang. He and Sun gave Liang Mengnü to Emperor Huan as an imperial consort, and, after Empress Liang's death, hoped to have her eventually created empress. To completely control her, Liang Ji planned to have her mother, Lady Xuan (宣), killed, and in fact sent assassins against her, but the assassination was foiled by the powerful eunuch Yuan She (袁赦), a neighbor of Lady Xuan.

Lady Xuan reported the assassination attempt to Emperor Huan, who was greatly angered. He entered into a conspiracy with eunuchs Tang Heng, Zuo Guan, Shan Chao (單超), Xu Huang (徐璜), and Ju Yuan (具瑗) to overthrow Liang—sealing the oath by biting open Shan's arm and swearing by his blood. Liang Ji had some suspicions about what Emperor Huan and the eunuchs were up to, and he investigated. The five eunuchs quickly reacted. They had Emperor Huan openly announce that he was taking back power from Liang Ji and mobilize the imperial guards to guard the palace against a counterattack by Liang, and then surrounded Liang's house and forced him to surrender. Liang and Sun were unable to respond and committed suicide. The entire Liang and Sun clans (except for Liang Ji's brothers Liang Buyi and Liang Meng (梁蒙), who had already died) were arrested and slaughtered. A large number of officials were executed or deposed for close association with Liang—so many that the government was almost unable to function for some time. Liang and Sun's properties were confiscated by the imperial treasury, which allowed the taxes to be reduced by 50% for one year. The people greatly celebrated Liang Ji's death.
