= Emperor Shun of Han =

Emperor of Han China from 125 to 144

Emperor Shun of Han 漢順帝

Emperor of the Han dynasty
- Reign: 16 December 125 – 20 September 144
- Predecessor: Marquess of Beixiang
- Successor: Emperor Chong of Han
- Born: 115
- Died: 20 September 144 (aged 29)
Names
- Family name: Liu (劉; liú); Given name: Bao (保; bǎo); Temple name: Jingzong (敬宗; jìng zōng); Posthumous name (full): Xiaoshun (孝順; xiào shùn; literary meaning: "filial and serene"); Posthumous name (short): Shun (順; shùn; literary meaning: "serene")
- Father: Emperor An of Han
- Mother: Consort Li

Emperor Shun of Han (simplified Chinese: 汉顺帝; traditional Chinese: 漢順帝; pinyin: Hàn Shùn Dì; Wade–Giles: Han Shun-ti; 115 – 20 September 144) was the 24th emperor of the Chinese Han dynasty and the eighth emperor of the Eastern Han. He reigned from December 125 to September 144.

Emperor Shun (Prince Bao) was the only son of Emperor An of Han. After Emperor An died in April 125, the Empress Dowager Yan, childless but yearning to hold on to power, displaced Prince Bao (whose title of crown prince she had wrongly caused Emperor An to strip in 124) from the throne in favour of Liu Yi, the Marquess of Beixiang. After Liu Yi died after reigning less than seven months, eunuchs loyal to Prince Bao, led by Sun Cheng, carried out a successful coup d'etat against the Empress Dowager, and Prince Bao was declared emperor at age 10.

The people had great expectations for Emperor Shun, whose reign followed his incompetent and violent father. However, while Emperor Shun's personality was mild, he was just as incompetent as his father and corruption continued without abatement among eunuchs and officials. He also overly entrusted government to his wife Empress Liang Na's father Liang Shang (梁商) - a mild-mannered man with integrity but little ability - and then Liang Shang's son Liang Ji - a corrupt and autocratic man. In general, Emperor Shun's reign was an improvement over his father's, but this minor improvement was unable to stem the Eastern Han dynasty's continued decline.

Emperor Shun died at the age of 29 after reigning for 19 years. He was succeeded by his son Emperor Chong.

== Family background ==
Prince Bao was born to Emperor An and his concubine Consort Li in 115, apparently shortly after Emperor An had created his favourite Yan Ji empress. Empress Yan had no sons, and out of jealousy, she poisoned Consort Li to death, an act that went unpunished. Empress Yan would continue to hold a grudge against Prince Bao, despite his youth. At the time of his birth, his father Emperor An was still in the shadow of Empress Dowager Deng Sui.

On 25 May 120, Emperor An created Prince Bao crown prince, as he was Emperor An's only son. Empress Dowager Deng died in April 121; with her death, Emperor An was finally able to exercise power on his own.

== Removal as crown prince and enthronement ==
In 124, some of the people trusted by Emperor An, eunuchs Jiang Jing (江京) and Fan Feng (樊豐) and his wet nurse Wang Sheng (王聖), for reasons no longer known, falsely accused Crown Prince Bao's wet nurse Wang Nan (王男) and chef Bing Ji (邴吉, not to be confused with Emperor Xuan's prime minister of the same name) of unspecified crimes. Emperor An executed Wang and Bing and exiled their families. The nine-year-old crown prince was greatly saddened. Jiang and Fan, fearful of reprisals later, entered into a conspiracy with Empress Yan (who had always hated Crown Prince Bao since he was not her own son) to falsely accuse Crown Prince Bao and his servants of crimes. Emperor An believed them and demoted Crown Prince Bao to be the Prince of Jiyin.

In April 125, Emperor An died suddenly while on a trip to Wancheng (宛城, in modern Nanyang, Henan). Although Prince Bao was Emperor An's only son and therefore logical heir, Empress Yan resolved to make someone younger to be the emperor so that she could better control him. She therefore made Liu Yi (劉懿), the Marquess of Beixiang, emperor. The 10-year-old Prince Bao was excluded not only from succession but even from the official mourning for his father. Empress Dowager Yan and her brothers dominated the political scene.

Later that year, the young emperor was gravely ill. The eunuch Sun Cheng, loyal to Prince Bao, entered into a conspiracy with Prince Bao's head of household, Changxing Qu (長興渠), and other eunuchs to restore Prince Bao. After the young emperor died, Sun and 18 of his fellow eunuchs made a surprise attack on the palace, killing Jiang and forcing Jiang's colleague Li Run (李閏) to join them. They then welcomed Prince Bao to the palace and declared him emperor. For several days, the eunuchs' forces battled with the empress dowager's forces, finally defeating the empress dowager and her brothers. The Yan clan was slaughtered, while Empress Dowager Yan was confined to her palace until her death in February 126.

== Early reign ==
At the start of Emperor Shun's reign, the people were hopeful that he would reform the political situation from the pervasive corruption under the Yans. However, the teenage emperor proved to be a kind but weak ruler. While he trusted certain honest officials, he also trusted many corrupt eunuchs, who quickly grabbed power. In 126, Sun Cheng tried to encourage the young emperor to carry out extensive reforms, but was instead removed from the capital for his audacity. Sun was recalled to the capital in 128, but continued to lack any influence to put into effect concrete reforms. Another major influence on Emperor Shun was his wet nurse Song E (宋娥), who was described as a kind woman. But she lacked the ability to be an effective advisor to the Emperor. Rather, she took on the role of an empress dowager.

Early in Emperor Shun's reign, Ban Chao's son, Ban Yong, was able to effectively restore Han suzerainty over Xiyu (modern Xinjiang and former Soviet central Asia) kingdoms, but in 127, Ban Yong was falsely accused of being late in arriving for a military action and removed from his office. After Ban Yong's removal, the situation in Xiyu gradually deteriorated.

Other than these events, the rule of Emperor Shun was generally one during which the empire avoided periods of political turmoil. Although the emperor lacked capability, and corruption continued to run unchecked, his personal kindness allowed the people a measure of peace.

In 131, Emperor Shun wanted to create an empress, and not wanting to play favourites, he considered drawing lots before the gods to determine who should be the empress. After his officials discouraged him from this action, he finally selected one of his consorts, Liang Na, as the one he considered most virtuous and most rational. He created her empress in March 132. She was 16 and he was 19. Her father Liang Shang (梁商) became an honoured official and was gradually promoted to increasingly important posts.

== Late reign ==
In 135, two major political changes occurred. Eunuch-marquesses began to be allowed to pass their marches to their adopted sons, and Liang Shang became the commander of the armed forces and effectively the most powerful individual in the imperial government. Neither of these developments appeared at the time to be major, but had great implications. The former demonstrated that the power of the eunuchs was becoming systemic, and the latter led to the start of the Liangs controlling the imperial government for several administrations.

Liang Shang was, much like his son-in-law, a kind man who lacked any real political abilities, even though he appeared to be honest, compassionate and ethical. For example, in 138, when there was a conspiracy by some eunuchs to undermine him that Emperor Shun discovered, he advocated leniency, and while Emperor Shun did not completely agree with him, Liang's intercession clearly saved many lives. However, both he and Emperor Shun trusted his son Liang Ji (梁冀) who, unlike his father, was corrupt and violent.

From 136 to 138, there were a number of native rebellions in various parts of southern China. While these were generally put down with relative ease (in particular, the rebels generally surrendered willingly if the corrupt officials they were protesting against were replaced by Emperor Shun), these would foreshadow the much more serious rebellions that would come in the next few decades. Further, in 139, the Qiang again rebelled, and this time the rebellion would not be put down easily and would plague Emperor Shun for the rest of his reign. Indeed, in 141, the Qiang forces annihilated a Han force led by Ma Xian (馬賢) and set fire to the tomb-gardens of a number of Western Han emperors in the Chang'an region. Further, agrarian rebellions started in Jing (荊州, modern Hunan, Hubei, and southern Henan) and Yang (揚州, modern Jiangxi, Zhejiang, and central and southern Jiangsu, Anhui) Provinces and would not be pacified for the rest of Emperor Shun's reign.

In September 141, Liang Shang died. Inexplicably, Emperor Shun gave his post to Liang's son Liang Ji and gave Liang Ji's post to his younger brother Liang Buyi (梁不疑). Liang Ji proceeded to seize power at every opportunity, and even though Liang Buyi tried to encourage his brother to be moderate in his behaviour, his pleas fell on deaf ears.

In 144, apparently already ill, Emperor Shun created his only son Liu Bing (劉炳), born of his concubine Consort Yu in 143, crown prince. Later that year, Emperor Shun died, and Crown Prince Bing succeeded him as Emperor Chong. Empress Dowager Liang served as regent, and while she personally appeared capable, her trust in her brother Liang Ji would lead to a further decline in the standing of the Eastern Han. On 26 October 144, Emperor Shun was buried and given the temple name "Jingzong". However, in 190, during the reign of Emperor Xian of Han, Emperor Shun's temple name was revoked. At the same time, the posthumous title of "Empress Gongmin" (恭愍皇后), which was granted to his mother Consort Li on 7 July 127, was also revoked.

== Era names ==
- Yongjian (永建) 126–132
- Yangjia (陽嘉) 132–135
- Yonghe (永和) 136–141
- Hanan (漢安) 142–144
- Jiankang (建康) 144

== Family ==
- Empress Shunlie, of the Liang clan (順烈皇后 梁氏; 116–150), personal name Na (妠)
- Meiren, of the Yu clan (美人 虞氏; d. 179)
  - Princess Wuyang (舞陽公主), personal name Sheng (生), first daughter
  - Liu Bing, Emperor Xiaochong (孝衝皇帝 劉炳; 143–145), first son
- Guiren, of the Liang clan (贵人 梁氏)
- Guiren, of the Dou clan (贵人 窦氏)
- Unknown
  - Princess Guanjun (冠軍公主), personal name Chengnan (成男), second daughter
  - Princess Ruyang (汝陽公主), personal name Guang (廣), third daughter

== See also ==
- Family tree of the Han dynasty

Emperor Shun of Han House of Liu Born: 115 Died: 144
Regnal titles
Preceded by Marquess of Beixiang	Emperor of China; Eastern Han; 125–144	Succeeded by Emperor Chong of Han
