= Chen Lin (Han dynasty) =

Chinese official, scholar and poet (died 217)

- 陳琳

Libationer and Military Adviser (軍謀祭酒) (under Cao Cao)
- In office c. 204–?
- Monarch: Emperor Xian of Han

Registrar (主簿) (under He Jin)
- In office ? – c. 189
- Monarch: Emperor Ling of Han

Personal details
- Born: Unknown Baoying County, Jiangsu
- Died: 217
- Occupation: Official, scholar, poet
- Courtesy name: Kongzhang (孔璋)

Chen Lin (陳琳;; died 217), courtesy name Kongzhang (孔璋), was an official, scholar and poet who lived during the late Eastern Han dynasty of China. He was one of the "Seven Scholars of Jian'an". He later served as Military Advisor to Cao Cao.

== Life ==
Chen Lin was from Sheyang County (射陽縣), Guangling Commandery, which is located east of present-day Baoying County, Jiangsu.

=== Under He Jin ===
He started his political career during the reign of Emperor Ling (r. 168–189) as a Registrar (主簿) under He Jin, the General-in-Chief.

In 189, He Jin wanted to summon military forces from outside the imperial capital Luoyang to pressure Empress Dowager He into agreeing to exterminate the eunuch faction. Chen Lin strongly objected to this idea and argued that "to act in this manner is no difference from lighting a furnace to burn a strand of hair". He Jin did not listen to him and ended up being assassinated by the eunuch faction, while the warlord Dong Zhuo took advantage of the power vacuum to enter Luoyang and seize control of the central government.

=== Under Yuan Shao ===
Chen Lin escaped from Luoyang and travelled to Ji Province, where he became a secretary of the warlord Yuan Shao, who became the Governor of Ji Province in 191. Chen helped Yuan write official documents. Around 199 or 200, Yuan asked Chen Lin to write a "declaration of war" against his arch rival, Cao Cao, who then controlled the Han central government and the figurehead Emperor Xian (r. 189–220). The piece of writing, called "Proclamation to Yu Province on Behalf of Yuan Shao" (為袁紹檄豫州), contained a list of Cao Cao's "crimes", insults directed at Cao Cao's ancestors, and calls for the people in Yu Province (Note: Yu Province, where the imperial capital Xu (許; present-day Xuchang, Henan), was under Cao Cao's control at the time.) to rise up against Cao Cao (among other things). In 200, Cao Cao defeated Yuan Shao at the decisive Battle of Guandu.

=== Under Cao Cao ===
After Yuan Shao's death in 202, internal conflict broke out between his sons Yuan Tan and Yuan Shang over control of their father's territories in northern China. Cui Yan, whom both Yuan Tan and Yuan Shang wanted on their side, refused to help either of them and was thrown into prison. Chen Lin and Yin Kui (陰夔) exculpated and saved Cui Yan. In 204, during the Battle of Ye between Cao Cao and Yuan Shang, Cao Cao sent a messenger to meet Chen Lin and ask him to surrender, but Chen Lin refused and was taken prisoner after Ye city fell to Cao Cao.

Many people feared for Chen Lin as they thought that Cao Cao would execute him for writing the "Proclamation to Yu Province on Behalf of Yuan Shao". However, Cao Cao not only spared life of Chen Lin because he appreciated his literary talent, but also recruited him to serve as a Libationer and Military Adviser (軍謀祭酒) under the Minister of Works (司空). (Note: Cao Cao held the position of Minister of Works from 196 to 208.) Chen Lin served under Cao Cao since then and helped him write official documents. He died in a great plague which rampaged through northern China in 217.

== Works ==
His surviving writings include literary yuefu written in imitation of comtemporary folk ballads, and he is considered one of the major exponents of this typical Jian'an poetry style, along with Cao Cao and others. Cao Cao's son and successor, Cao Pi, ranked Chen Lin as what he termed the "Seven Scholars of Jian'an". (Note: "Jian'an" was the era name of Emperor Xian's reign from 196 to 220.) The other six members of the "Seven Scholars of Jian'an" were Wang Can, Ruan Yu (阮瑀), Liu Zhen (劉楨), Xu Gan, Ying Yang (應瑒) and Kong Rong, respectively. In 218, the year following the plague, Cao Pi wrote a letter to his friend Wu Zhi lamenting that Chen Lin and three other members of the "Seven Scholars of Jian'an" (Xu Gan, Liu Zhen and Ying Chang) had died in the previous year.

One of Chen Lin's yuefu poems was translated by Wai-lim Yip as "Water the Horses at a Breach in the Great Wall".

== See also ==
- Lists of people of the Three Kingdoms
- Jian'an poetry
- Cao Zhi, son of Cao Cao and contemporary poet
