= Hou Lan =

Chinese Han dynasty eunuch-official (died 172)

- Traditional Chinese: 侯覽
- Simplified Chinese: 侯览
Transcriptions
Standard Mandarin
- Hanyu Pinyin: Hóu Lǎn

Hou Lan (died 172) was a Chinese politician. He was a eunuch-official who served under Emperor Huan (r. 146–168) of the Eastern Han dynasty in China.

In the beginning of the 14th-century historical novel Romance of the Three Kingdoms, Hou Lan is listed as one of the Ten Attendants even though historically he was not a member of the group.

== Life ==
Hou Lan was from Shanyang Commandery (山陽郡), which is around present-day Jining, Shandong. In 159, he participated in a coup against Liang Ji, a highly influential general who monopolised state power in the 150s, and succeeded in ousting the general from power. In recognition of his contributions, Emperor Huan enfeoffed him as the Marquis of Gao.

In 165, Grand Commandant Yang Bing requested Emperor Huan to dismiss Hou Lan because Hou Lan allegedly allowed his brother, Hou Can, to engage in extortion and corrupt practices. Hou Lan was dismissed in 165, but reinstated by 166.

At some point prior to 172, Hou Lan became Grand Coachman of Changle Palace. This was the official residence of Empress Dowager Dou, so his appointment presumably reflected that he had backing from the empress dowager. The appointment is likely to have occurred in 168, when the death of Emperor Huan left Hou Lan powerless. While Empress Dowager Dou is known to have protected him from being executed by the court officials, in 168, Chen Fan, a senior official, urged the empress dowager to execute the corrupt eunuch.

In 172, Hou Lan was abruptly “found guilty of luxury and arrogance, and of acting with arbitrary authority.” He was ordered to surrender his seal and ribbon of office. He then committed suicide. It seems likely that Hou Lan's downfall, on such vague charges, did not result from any particular misconduct of his own. Rather, his arrest and dismissal are better explained by his relationship to Empress Dowager Dou in the controversy which led to her arrest and the death of her brother Dou Wu, together with many of their relatives, in the year 172.
