= Li Ying (Eastern Han) =

Eastern Han dynasty Confucian scholar and official (110-169)

Li Ying (Chinese: 李膺; pinyin: Lǐ Yīng; 110 - c.November 169), courtesy name Fuli (符礼), was a Confucian scholar and official during the Eastern Han dynasty. He was implicated during the first Disaster of the Partisan Prohibitions during the reign of Emperor Huan of Han, and eventually killed during the second Disaster during the reign of Emperor Ling.

== Background ==
Li Ying was from Yingchuan Commandery. Due to his personality, he had few friends, except for Xun Shu (荀淑; father of Xun Shuang and grandfather of Xun Yu) and Chen Shi from the same commandery, whom he regarded as mentors as well.

Li Ying's grandfather Li Xiu (李脩) served as Grand Commandant during the reign of Emperor An of Han, while his father Li Yi (李益) was Chancellor (国相) of the state of Zhao. The mother of Zhong Hao's (Zhong Yao's grandfather) paternal nephew Zhong Jin (鍾瑾; son of an elder brother of Zhong Hao) was a paternal aunt of Li Ying.

== Service under Emperors Shun, Chong and Zhi ==
Li Ying was nominated as xiaolian in c.132. In that year, the official Zuo Xiong (左雄) proposed that nominated xiaolians below the age of 40 (by East Asian reckoning) needed to be tested more stringently; Emperor Shun agreed. Chen Fan and Li Ying were among the 30-plus individuals who passed the stringent tests and were granted the position of langzhong (郎中). Between December 142 and July 146, Li Ying was recruited as an official by Hu Guang (胡广), who was then situ.

== Service under Emperor Huan ==
After his recruitment by Hu Guang, Li Ying was able to pass the government certification test and was appointed Inspector of Qingzhou. Many officials in the province, fearing his severity, abandoned their posts. After Qingzhou, Li Ying was appointed Administrator of Yuyang Commandery; after a short stint at Yuyang, he was appointed Administrator of Shu Commandery. While at Shu Commandery, he resigned, citing his mother's advanced age.

In c.August 156, with the Xianbei raiding Yunzhong Commandery, Li Ying was appointed General Who Crosses the Liao (River) by Emperor Huan when the emperor heard of his abilities. When Li reached the border, the raiders were so in awe of him that they released the populace they had captured previously.

In c.159, Li Ying was made Intendant of Henan Commandery.

In late 166, (Note: Li Ying's biography in Houhanshu recorded that after Chen Fan was dismissed as Grand Commandant (太尉), many officials wanted Li Ying to serve as Grand Commandant. However, Xun Shuang was worried that Li Ying would incur the jealousy of others due to his fame and popularity, so he wrote a letter to Li Ying to advise him to maintain a low profile to avoid trouble. Emperor Huan's biography recorded that Chen Fan was dismissed as Grand Commandant in the 7th month of the 9th year of the Yanxi era of his reign. The month corresponds to 14 Aug to 12 Sep 166 in the Julian calendar. Thus, the Zhang Cheng case likely happened in late 166.) Li Ying handled a murder case: Zhang Cheng (張成), a fortune teller in Luoyang, had foretold that a general pardon would be forthcoming, and he therefore instructed his son to commit the murder. Li Ying, by then one of the foremost Confucian scholars in government who was serving as the governor of the capital province, arrested the Zhangs, but at this time a general pardon was issued. Li, in anger, disregarded the pardon and executed the Zhangs anyway. He was then accused by palace eunuchs of plotting treason with students at the Imperial University and associates in the provinces who opposed the eunuchs. Emperor Huan was furious, arresting Li and his followers, who were only released from prison the following year (167) due to pleas from the General-in-Chief Dou Wu (Emperor Huan's father-in-law). However, Li Ying and hundreds of his followers were proscribed from holding any offices and were branded as partisans (黨人).

== During Emperor Ling's reign ==
In January 168, Emperor Huan died without issue. In February, after Empress Dowager Dou Miao (Emperor Huan's widow) consulted her father and Chen Fan, Liu Hong, then Marquis of Jiedu Village (解瀆亭侯), was selected as the next emperor; he would posthumously be known as Emperor Ling.

In October 168, Chen Fan and Dou Wu plotted against the eunuchs, but their plan was leaked; they were then both killed. With Dou Wu eliminated and the Empress Dowager under house arrest, the eunuchs renewed the proscriptions against Li Ying and his followers; in 169, they had hundreds more officials and students prohibited from serving office, sent their families into exile, and had Li Ying executed.

== Anecdote ==
In the early 160s, (Note: Since Kong Rong's birth year was either 151 or 153, this anecdote happened in either 160 or 162.) when he was 10 years old (by East Asian reckoning), Kong Rong paid a visit to Li Ying, who received no one but the very eminent and his own relatives. Claiming to be a relative, Kong Rong was brought before Li Ying, who asked how they were related. Kong Rong answered that his ancestor Confucius was a student and friend of Laozi (whose family name was said to be Li (李)). Another guest present, Chen Wei (陈炜), was not impressed, commenting that a person who showed great ability at a young age might not grow up to be especially capable. Kong Rong immediately retorted, "I suppose you were really smart when you were young." Li Ying laughed at this and predicted the child would grow up to be a great man.

== Descendants ==
Li Ying was recorded to have a son, Li Zan (李瓒), (Note: Xie Cheng recorded this son's name as "Li Gui" (李珪).) who was Chancellor of Dongping. Li Zan was impressed with Cao Cao's abilities before the latter became famous. At his deathbed, he told those who had gathered around him (including his son Li Xuan [李宣]), "Times will soon become chaotic; of the Tianxia's heroes, none surpass Cao Cao. I am good friends with Zhang Miao, while you all are maternal relatives of Yuan Shao. But, do not become their followers; you all must go to Cao Cao." Li Zan's sons followed their father's advice, and survived the turbulent end of the Han dynasty.

== See also ==
- Disasters of the Partisan Prohibitions
