= Wang Bi =

Chinese philosopher and author (226–249)

Wang Bi 王弼
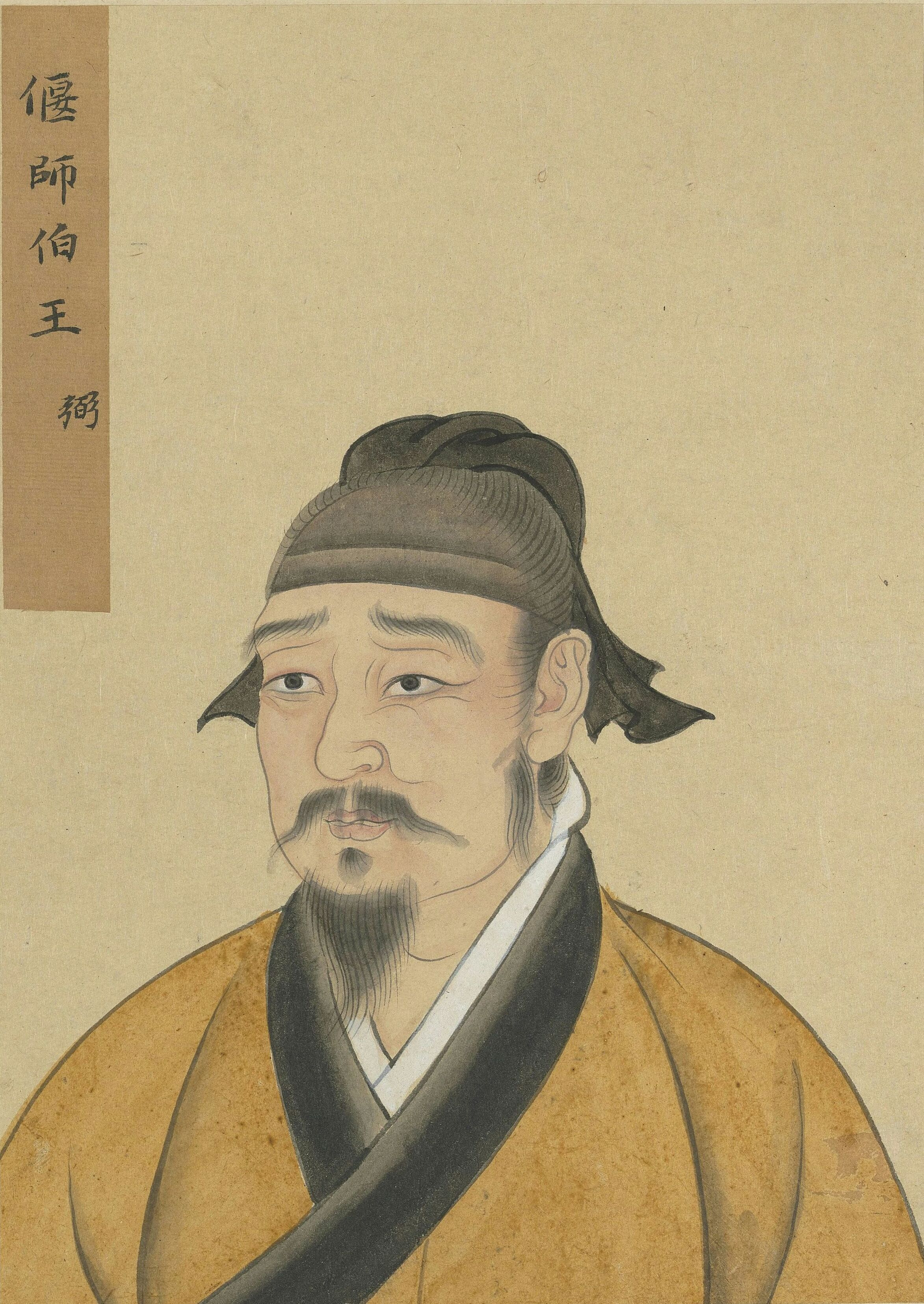
- Born: 226; Shandong Province
- Died: 249 (aged 23)
- Other name: Fusi (輔嗣)
- Occupations: Philosopher, politician
- Father: Wang Ye (courtesy name Zhangxu)

Wang Bi
- Chinese: 王弼
Transcriptions
Standard Mandarin
- Hanyu Pinyin: Wáng Bì
- Wade–Giles: Wang^{2} Pi^{4}
- IPA: [wǎŋ pî]
Yue: Cantonese
- Yale Romanization: Wòhng Baht
- Jyutping: Wong4 Bat6
- IPA: [wɔŋ˩ pɐt̚˨]

Wang Bi (Chinese: 王弼; 226–249), courtesy name Fusi (Chinese: 輔嗣), was a Chinese philosopher and politician. During his brief career, he produced commentaries on the Tao Te Ching and I Ching which were highly influential in Chinese philosophy.

== Life and background ==
Wang Bi's grandfather Wang Kai (王凯) was a clansman of Wang Can, one of the Seven Scholars of Jian'an, while Wang Kai's wife was a daughter of the warlord Liu Biao. After Wang Can's two sons were implicated in Wei Feng's rebellion in 219 and executed, Wang Bi's father Wang Ye was made Wang Can's heir; Wang Ye also inherited Wang Can's library of about 10000 volumes (including books from Cai Yong's collection), which he later passed on to his sons Wang Hong (王宏) and Hong's younger brother Wang Bi. Wang Bi served as a minor bureaucrat in the state of Cao Wei during the Three Kingdoms period. He died from an epidemic at the age of 23.

Wang Bi's most important works are commentaries on Laozi's Tao Te Ching and the I Ching. The text of the Tao Te Ching that appeared with his commentary was widely considered the best copy of this work until the discovery of the Han-era Mawangdui texts in 1973. He was a scholar of Xuanxue.

== Writings ==
At least three works by Wang Bi are known: a commentary on Confucius' Analects, which survives only in quotations; commentaries on the I Ching and the Tao Te Ching, which not only have survived but have greatly influenced subsequent Chinese thought on those two classics.

His commentary on the I Ching has been translated into English by Richard John Lynn, The Classic of Changes (New York: Columbia University, 1994) ISBN 0-231-08295-9

Several translations into English have been made of his commentary of the Tao Te Ching:

- Ariane Rump, translator Commentary on the Lao Tzu by Wang Pi, Monographs of the Society for Asian and Comparative Philosophy, No. 6 (Honolulu: University of Hawaii, 1979) ISBN 0-8248-0677-8
- Richard John Lynn, translator The Classic of the Way and Virtue; A New Translation of the Tao-te Ching of Laozi as Interpreted by Wang Bi (New York: Columbia University, 1999) ISBN 0-2311-0581-9
- Rudolf Wagner, translator. A Chinese Reading of the Daodejing: Wang Bi's Commentary on the Laozi with Critical Text and Translation (Albany: State University of New York Press, 2003) ISBN 0-791-45182-8

The earliest preserved explicit quotation of Wang Bi's writings are in a commentary on the Liezi by a Zhang Zhan, himself related to Wang Bi, circa 320 CE.

The German philosopher Kai Marchal wrote a literary essay about his experience of reading Wang Bi in times of global upheaval.

== See also ==
- Lists of people of the Three Kingdoms
