= Ten Attendants =

Influential eunuch-officials during the reign of Emperor Ling

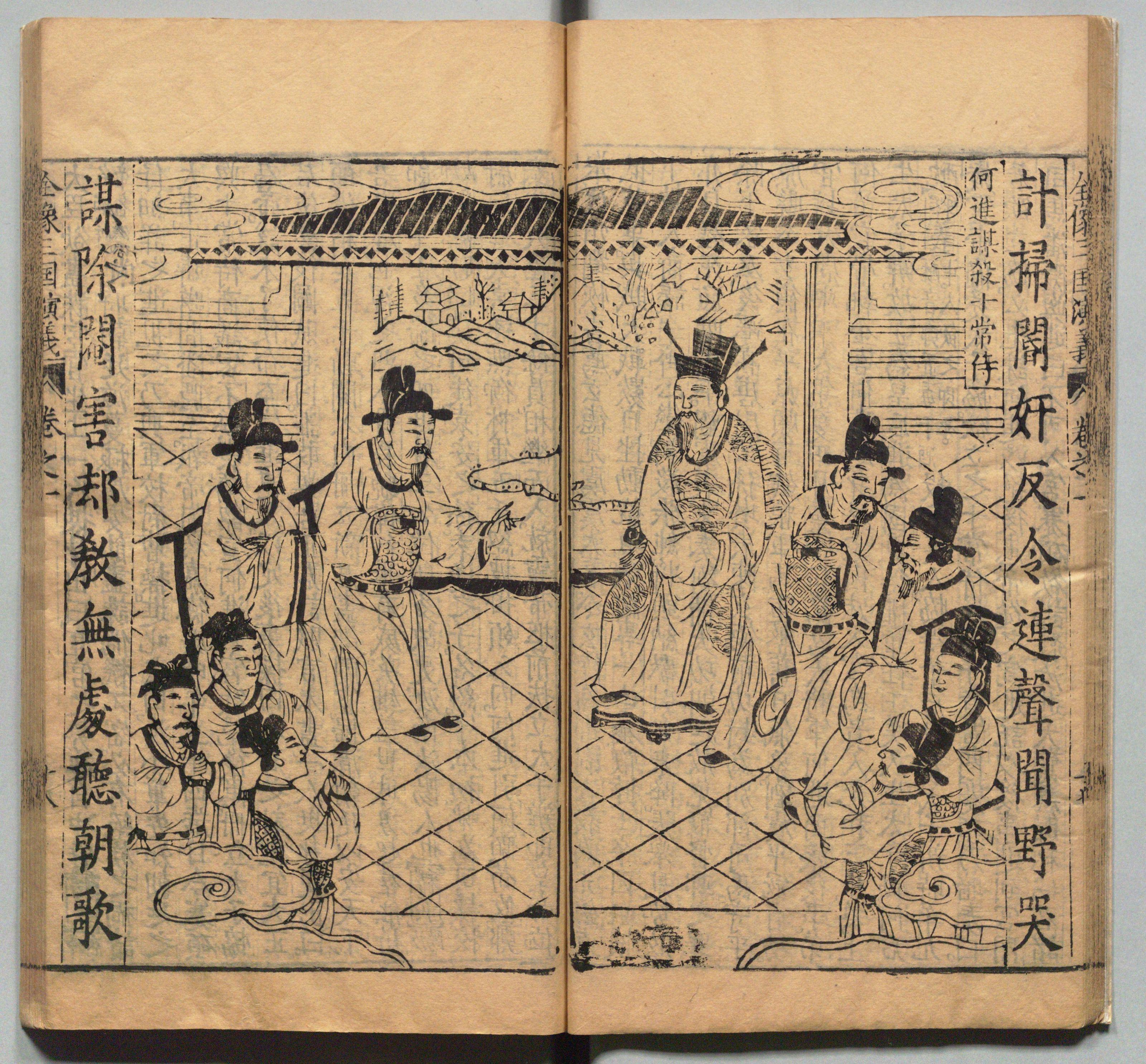
- An illustration of the Ten Attendants from the Romance of the Three Kingdoms.
- Chinese: 十常侍
Transcriptions
Standard Mandarin
- Hanyu Pinyin: Shí Chángshì

The Ten Attendants, also known as the Ten Eunuchs, were a group of influential eunuch-officials in the imperial court of the Chinese Eastern Han dynasty, during the reign of Emperor Ling (r. 168–189). Although they are often referred to as a group of 10, there were actually 12 of them, and all held the position of zhong changshi (中常侍; "Central Regular Attendant") in Emperor Ling's imperial court.

The 12 were: Zhang Rang (張讓), Zhao Zhong (趙忠), Xia Yun (夏惲), Guo Sheng (郭勝), Sun Zhang (孫璋), Bi Lan (畢嵐), Li Song (栗嵩), Duan Gui (段珪), Gao Wang (高望), Zhang Gong (張恭), Han Kui (韓悝) and Song Dian (宋典).

== Early years ==
Two of the eunuchs, Zhang Rang (張讓) and Zhao Zhong (趙忠), started serving in the Han imperial palace as attendants holding the rank of jishi shengzhong (給事省中). Zhang Rang was from Yingchuan Commandery (潁川郡; around present-day Xuchang, Henan) while Zhao Zhong was from Anping Commandery (安平郡; around present-day Jizhou, Hebei). They were promoted to xiao huangmen (小黃門) during the reign of Emperor Huan (r. 146–168). In 159, Zhao Zhong participated in a coup against Liang Ji, a highly influential general who monopolised state power in the 150s, and succeeded in ousting him from power. In recognition of Zhao Zhong's efforts, Emperor Huan enfeoffed him as a marquis of a chief district (都鄉侯). In 165, Zhao Zhong was promoted to a secondary marquis (關內侯) and allowed to draw an annual salary of 1,000 hu of grain.

== During Emperor Ling's reign ==
During the reign of Emperor Ling (r. 168–189), Zhao Zhong and Zhang Rang rose to the position of zhong changshi (中常侍) and received marquis titles from the emperor. They were also close allies of two other influential eunuchs, Cao Jie (曹節; died 181) and Wang Fu (王甫; died 179). After Cao Jie's death, Zhao Zhong assumed the appointment of Empress's Chamberlain (大長秋). Around the time, Zhang Rang and Zhao Zhong, along with ten others – Xia Yun (夏惲), Guo Sheng (郭勝), Sun Zhang (孫璋), Bi Lan (畢嵐), Li Song (栗嵩), Duan Gui (段珪), Gao Wang (高望), Zhang Gong (張恭), Han Kui (韓悝) and Song Dian (宋典) – all held the position of zhong changshi (中常侍), in addition to marquis titles. Their relatives and associates, who were spread throughout the various provinces and commanderies of the Han Empire, were notorious for corruption.

Zhang Rang instructed Bi Lan to serve the area near the Luoyang palace with running water, and so Bi Lan built chain pumps and suction pumps outside the Peace Gate.

=== Yellow Turban Rebellion ===
When the Yellow Turban Rebellion broke out in 184, an official Zhang Jun (張鈞) wrote a memorial to Emperor Ling, blaming the Ten Attendants and their relatives and associates for the corruption that fuelled the grievances which led to the rebellion. He urged Emperor Ling to execute the Ten Attendants and make it known throughout the Han Empire, so as to appease the common people's anger.

When Emperor Ling showed the eunuchs the memorial, they removed their hats and shoes, knelt down, begged the emperor to imprison them and expressed their willingness to donate their wealth to fund the army in quelling the rebellion. The emperor ordered them to put on their hats and shoes, and continue with what they were doing previously. He then chided Zhang Jun, "You're mad! Are there no good ones among the Ten Attendants?" Zhang Jun submitted another memorial similar to the previous one, but the memorial never made it to Emperor Ling's desk. Emperor Ling later ordered the Minister of Justice (廷尉) and Imperial Secretaries (御史) to investigate Zhang Jue and his Taiping Sect (太平道), who started the Yellow Turban Rebellion. Zhang Rang and the eunuchs secretly instructed the investigators to frame Zhang Jun for learning the ways of the Taiping Sect; Zhang Jun was imprisoned and tortured, and eventually died in prison.

The eunuchs themselves were, in fact, secretly in contact or collaborating with Zhang Jue. After two eunuchs, Feng Xu (封諝) and Xu Feng (徐奉), were caught and executed, an angry Emperor Ling scolded the eunuchs, "You often say the officials were up to no good. Some of them have been imprisoned while others were executed. Now they are the ones who prove to be useful for the Empire, while you're the ones working with Zhang Jue. So whom should I execute?" The eunuchs begged for mercy and pushed the blame to Wang Fu (王甫) and Hou Lan (侯覽). Emperor Ling then let them off.

=== Corruption ===
Zhang Rang had a number of housekeepers to help him manage his household. His housekeepers built networks with other influential persons and accepted bribes. There was one Meng Tuo (孟佗; father of Meng Da) from Fufeng Commandery (扶風郡) who gave all his family fortune as a gift to one of Zhang Rang's housekeepers. The housekeeper, grateful for the generous gift, asked him what he wanted in return. Meng Tuo said that all he wanted was to meet Zhang Rang. Around the time, there were many people seeking an audience with Zhang Rang; these people, bringing along carts filled with gifts, formed a long queue outside Zhang Rang's residence. Meng Tuo showed up late so he could not enter. To his surprise, the housekeeper, whom he befriended, came out to welcome him like an honoured guest and instructed the servants to carry him into Zhang Rang's residence. The other visitors saw that and thought that he was a special friend of Zhang Rang, so they eagerly showered him with gifts to flatter him. When Meng Tuo met Zhang Rang later, he gave some of the gifts he received to the latter, who was delighted. Zhang Rang later helped Meng Tuo become the Inspector (刺史) of Liang Province.

In 185, when a fire broke out in the southern part of the imperial palace, the Ten Attendants suggested to Emperor Ling to levy a tax of ten maces from every mu of farmland to raise funds for rebuilding the palace. Emperor Ling then ordered the officials in Taiyuan (太原), Hedong (河東) and Didao (狄道) commanderies to transport wood and patterned rocks to Luoyang (the imperial capital) as construction materials. When the shipments reached the palace, the eunuchs who received them scolded the labourers for delivering materials of poor quality, and insisted on paying them far below market prices – to as low as a tenth of the market price. They then resold the materials to other eunuchs, who refused to buy. Over time, the accumulated piles of wood started decaying. The construction works were thus delayed for years. In order to please Emperor Ling, some regional officials levied heavier taxes and forced the people to produce greater quantities of construction materials – this led to greater resentment from the common people.

Emperor Ling often said, "Regular Attendant Zhang (Rang) is my father, Regular Attendant Zhao (Zhong) is my mother." As the eunuchs were highly trusted and favoured by Emperor Ling, they behaved lawlessly and abused their power. They even built lavish mansions for themselves in the same design as the imperial palace. When Emperor Ling once visited Yong'anhou Platform (永安侯臺), a high viewing platform, the eunuchs were worried that he would see their mansions and become suspicious. Thus, they told him, "Your Majesty shouldn't put yourself on higher ground. If you do so, the people will scatter." The emperor believed them and stopped visiting high towers and viewing platforms.

In 186, Emperor Ling tasked the eunuchs Song Dian (宋典) and Bi Lan (畢嵐) with overseeing new construction projects, including a new palace hall, four large bronze statues, four giant bronze bells and water-spouting animal sculptures, among others. He also ordered coins to be minted and widely circulated. Many people perceived this to be a display of the emperor's extravagance, and pointed to signs showing that the coins will eventually scatter everywhere. This turned out to be true when chaos broke out in Luoyang after Emperor Ling's death. Emperor Ling appointed Zhao Zhong as "General of Chariots of Cavalry" (車騎將軍) but removed him from office after some 100 days.

== Downfall of the eunuch faction ==
Massacre of the Eunuchs
- Part of the end of the Han dynasty
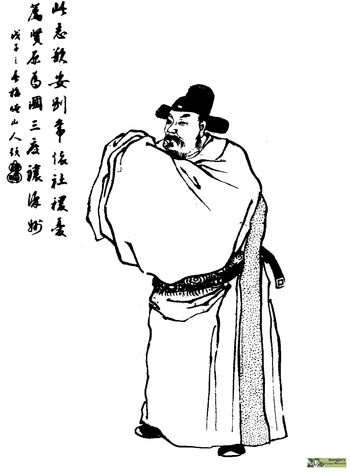
- A Qing dynasty illustration of He Jin.
| Date | 22 September 189 |
| Location | Luoyang |
| Result | Eunuch faction eliminated |

Belligerents
| Eunuch faction | Warlord coalition |

Commanders and leaders
| Ten Attendants † | He Jin †; Yuan Shao; Yuan Shu; Dong Zhuo |

Casualties and losses
| 2,000+, including the Ten Attendants | Unknown |

When Emperor Ling became critically ill in 189, he secretly entrusted his younger son, Liu Xie, then about eight years old, to a close aide and eunuch, Jian Shuo. Upon the emperor's death, Jian Shuo attempted to install Liu Xie on the throne but his plan failed. Emperor Ling's older son, the 13-year-old Liu Bian, became emperor instead and was known as Emperor Shao. Empress Dowager He (Emperor Shao's mother) and General-in-Chief He Jin (Empress Dowager He's brother) became the regents ruling on behalf of the underage emperor.

In the summer of 189, after Jian Shuo learnt that He Jin and his subordinates were plotting to eliminate him, he tried to persuade his fellow eunuchs to join him in his plan to assassinate He Jin. However, they were persuaded by Guo Sheng, who was close to Empress Dowager He, to reject Jian Shuo's idea. He Jin subsequently had Jian Shuo arrested and executed, and then took control of the military units previously under Jian's command. In the autumn of 189, Yuan Shao suggested to He Jin to eliminate the eunuch faction and consolidate power. Empress Dowager He immediately rejected the idea because it required her to interact with men on a regular basis, which she found offensive and immodest. Empress Dowager He's mother (the Lady of Wuyang) and He Miao (何苗) had been bribed by the eunuchs to protect them, so they also strongly opposed He Jin's plan, saying that they owed much to the eunuchs. (Empress Dowager He had become Emperor Ling's consort because the eunuchs helped her.)

He Jin then heeded an alternative suggestion from Yuan Shao: he secretly instructed a few provincial military officials or warlords (Dong Zhuo, Wang Kuang, Qiao Mao and Ding Yuan) to lead their troops to the vicinity of Luoyang, the imperial capital, and openly demand that the eunuchs be executed – in the hope of pressuring Empress Dowager He to take action against the eunuchs. Empress Dowager He initially refused to harm the eunuchs, but as Dong Zhuo's forces approached Luoyang, she ordered the eunuchs to leave the palace and return to their marquisates. (Many of the eunuchs had been made marquises by Emperor Ling.) Empress Dowager He's younger sister married Zhang Rang's (adopted) son. Zhang Rang pleaded with her to help him, so she informed her mother (the Lady of Wuyang), who in turn spoke to Empress Dowager He. The empress dowager relented and summoned the eunuchs back to the palace.

Around September 189, the eunuchs hatched a plot to assassinate He Jin. Zhang Rang planted a spy to overhear He Jin's conversation with the Empress Dowager He about exterminating the eunuchs. Once the spy reported back to the eunuchs with the details of He Jin's plan, they issued a fake summons to He Jin under the name of the Empress Dowager. On 22 September 189, He Jin arrived without his escort to the Imperial Palace, where he was subsequently trapped and brutally murdered by the eunuchs, who alleged he was guilty of treason against the Han. After He Jin's death, his subordinates Wu Kuang (吳匡) and Zhang Zhang (張璋), along with Yuan Shao, Yuan Shu, Cao Cao, and others, led their troops to storm the palace and kill the eunuchs in revenge. They indiscriminately slaughtered anyone who looked like a eunuch; some young men who had no facial hair, in desperation, dropped their pants in front of the soldiers to prove that they were not eunuchs. During the attack, the eunuchs took Empress Dowager He, Emperor Shao and the Prince of Chenliu (Liu Xie) hostage and tried to flee from the palace up the Yellow River toward Chang'an. Lu Zhi intercepted the eunuch Duan Gui (段珪) and saved the empress dowager from him. He Miao, who was sympathetic towards the eunuchs, was killed by Wu Kuang and Dong Zhuo's younger brother, Dong Min (董旻). Over 2,000 people died in the attack.

Zhang Rang and some 10 other eunuchs managed to bring Emperor Shao and the Prince of Chenliu to the riverbank, with imperial forces led by Lu Zhi and Min Gong (閔貢) hot on their heels. Zhang Rang turned to Emperor Shao and tearfully said, "We're going to be destroyed and chaos will break out in the Empire. Your Majesty, please take care of yourself!" He then threw himself into the river and drowned.

Dong Zhuo later found the stranded Emperor Shao and Liu Xie and escorted them back to Luoyang, where he appointed himself as Minister of Works. Later that year, Dong Zhuo deposed Emperor Shao and replaced him with Liu Xie, who later became known as Emperor Xian. Dong Zhuo's tyranny and the subsequent breakdown of central command that followed kicked off a series of civil wars that lasted for nearly a century, during which time the Han Dynasty came to an end and the Three Kingdoms period started in its place.

== In Romance of the Three Kingdoms ==
The Ten Attendants appear at the beginning of the 14th-century historical novel Romance of the Three Kingdoms, which romanticises the events leading to the end of the Han dynasty and through the Three Kingdoms period of China. The ten listed in the novel were:

- Feng Xu (封諝), executed in 184 for conspiring with the Yellow Turban rebels
- Jian Shuo (蹇碩), killed by Guo Sheng for attempting to assassinate He Jin
- Zhao Zhong (趙忠), killed by Yuan Shu and Wu Kuang (吳匡)
- Guo Sheng (郭勝), killed by Yuan Shu and Wu Kuang
- Xia Yun (夏惲), killed by Yuan Shu and Wu Kuang
- Cheng Kuang (程曠), killed by Yuan Shu and Wu Kuang
- Zhang Rang (張讓), drowned
- Duan Gui (段珪), killed by Min Gong (閔貢)
- Hou Lan (侯覽)
- Cao Jie (曹節)

Five of these ten eunuchs were not among the historical Ten Attendants: Cheng Kuang is a fictional character (there was a eunuch by the name Cheng Huang [fl. 126–189] in the reign of Emperor Ling of Han, his given name "璜" written and pronounced slightly similar to the fictional character's "曠"); Feng Xu and Jian Shuo existed historically, but were not listed among the Ten Attendants in the Book of the Later Han; Hou Lan and Cao Jie died in 172 and 181 respectively so they could not have been present when the events of the novel took place.

== In popular culture ==
The Ten Attendants appear in Koei's Dynasty Warriors video game series, specifically in 4: Xtreme Legends (Dong Zhuo's Story Mode), 5: Xtreme Legends, and 8: Xtreme Legends (Lü Bu's Story and Ambition Modes).

In Wo Long: Fallen Dynasty, Zhang Rang is featured as a minor antagonist. He is portrayed as a corrupt government minister who conspired with the game's main antagonist, Yu Ji, to support the Yellow Turban Rebellion in order to cause chaos in the country as a pretext to concentrate more power on himself. During the story, the unnamed protagonist, Cao Cao and Yuan Shao break into his personal estate in the capital and confront him, intent on assassinating him for his crimes. However, Zhang uses dark magic to create ten clones of himself and fight against his would-be assassins. He is eventually defeated and tries to flee, only to be killed by Dong Zhuo.

In Total War: Three Kingdoms, the Ten Attendants appear as unique court nobles. They are all part of Liu Hong's faction in the Mandate of Heaven campaign.

== See also ==
- Disasters of the Partisan Prohibitions
- Eunuchs in China
- Jian Shuo – Chinese Han dynasty eunuch and general (died 189)
- Xiao Huangmen – Role for a eunuch in the Han dynasty
- Book of Jin – Chinese historical text (compiled in 648)
- Book of the Later Han – 5th-century Chinese history book
- Records of the Three Kingdoms – Chinese official history (c. 290 CE)
- Romance of the Three Kingdoms – 14th-century Chinese historical novel
- Zizhi Tongjian – 1084 Chinese chronicle covering 403 BC – 959 AD
- Emperor Huan of Han – Emperor of Han China from 146 to 168
- Emperor Ling of Han – Emperor of the Han dynasty from 168 to 189
- End of the Han dynasty – Historical era of China (189–220)
- He Jin – Han dynasty regent and general (died 189)
- Yellow Turban Rebellion – Peasant revolt against the Eastern Han dynasty
- Lists of people of the Three Kingdoms
