= Cao Jie =

Cao Jie may refer to:

- Cao Jie (eunuch) (died 181), eunuch of the late Han dynasty
- Empress Cao (Han dynasty), final empress of the Han dynasty
