= Poetry of Cao Cao =

Works of the Chinese warlord (155–220)

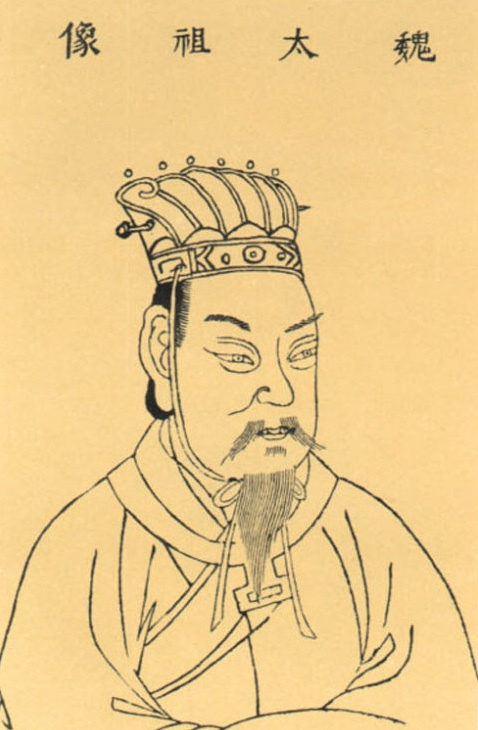
A Ming dynasty portrait of Cao Cao from the Sancai Tuhui.

Cao Cao (155–220) was a warlord who rose to power towards the final years of the Eastern Han dynasty (25–220 CE) and became the de facto head of government in China. He laid the foundation for what was to become the state of Cao Wei (220–265), founded by his son and successor Cao Pi, in the Three Kingdoms period (220–280). Poetry, among other things, was one of his cultural legacies.

== Overview ==
Cao Cao was an accomplished poet, as were his sons Cao Pi and Cao Zhi. Cao Cao was also a patron of poets such as Xu Gan. Of Cao Cao's works, only a handful remain today. His verses, unpretentious yet profound, helped to reshape the poetic style of his time and beyond, eventually contributing to the poetry styles associated with Tang dynasty poetry. Cao Cao, Cao Pi and Cao Zhi are known collectively as the "Three Caos". The Three Caos' poetry, together with additional poets, eventually developed into the Jian'an style: Jian'an was the era name for the period from 196 to 220. Poets of the Cao family and others continued to write and develop the poetry of this style, after the end of the Han dynasty and the subsequent founding of the Cao Wei state: these were the Jian'an poets. The effects of civil strife on poetry towards the end of the Eastern Han dynasty contributed to the development of a solemn and heart-stirring tone of lament for life's ephemeral nature during the period of Jian'an poetry.

From its roots in Han poetry folk songs, Jian'an poetry evolved into a form of scholarly poetry that is characteristic of Six Dynasties poetry. Cao Cao and other Jian'an poets developed the characteristic Han fu (or yuefu) poetry style deriving from folk song or ballad traditions, such as of uneven line lengths. Irregular lines became transformed into regular five-character line-length styles, very similar (and inspirational to) the shi poetry of the Tang dynasty's five-character regular line. Cao Cao has specifically been noted for his ballad-style verse, which he apparently set to music.

Cao Cao also wrote verse in the older four-character per line style characteristic of the Classic of Poetry. Burton Watson describes Cao Cao as: "the only writer of the period who succeeded in infusing the old four-character metre with any vitality, mainly because he discarded the archaic diction associated with it and employed the ordinary poetic language of his time." Cao Cao is also known for his early contributions to the Shanshui poetry genre, with his 4-character-per-line, 14-line poem "View of the Blue Sea" (觀滄海).

== Poems ==
=== Though the Tortoise Lives Long ===
One of Cao Cao's most celebrated pieces, written in the old four-character line style, is titled Though the Tortoise Lives Long (龜雖壽). It is one part of a four-part poem titled Steps through the Illustrious Gate (步出夏門行). It was written during the Battle of White Wolf Mountain in 207.

龜雖壽

神龜雖壽，
猶有竟時。
騰蛇乘霧，
終為土灰。
老驥伏櫪，
志在千里；
烈士暮年，
壯心不已。
盈縮之期，
不但在天；
養怡之福，
可得永年。
幸甚至哉！
歌以咏志。

Translation:
Though the Tortoise Lives Long

Though the tortoise blessed with magic powers lives long,
Its days have their allotted span.
Though winged serpents ride high on the mist,
They turn to dust and ashes at the last.
An old war-horse may be stabled,
Yet still it longs to gallop a thousand li;
And a noble-hearted man though advanced in years
Never abandons his proud aspirations.
Man's span of life, whether long or short,
Depends not on Heaven alone;
One who eats well and keeps cheerful
Can live to a great old age.
And so, with joy in my heart,
I hum this song.

=== Short Song Style ===
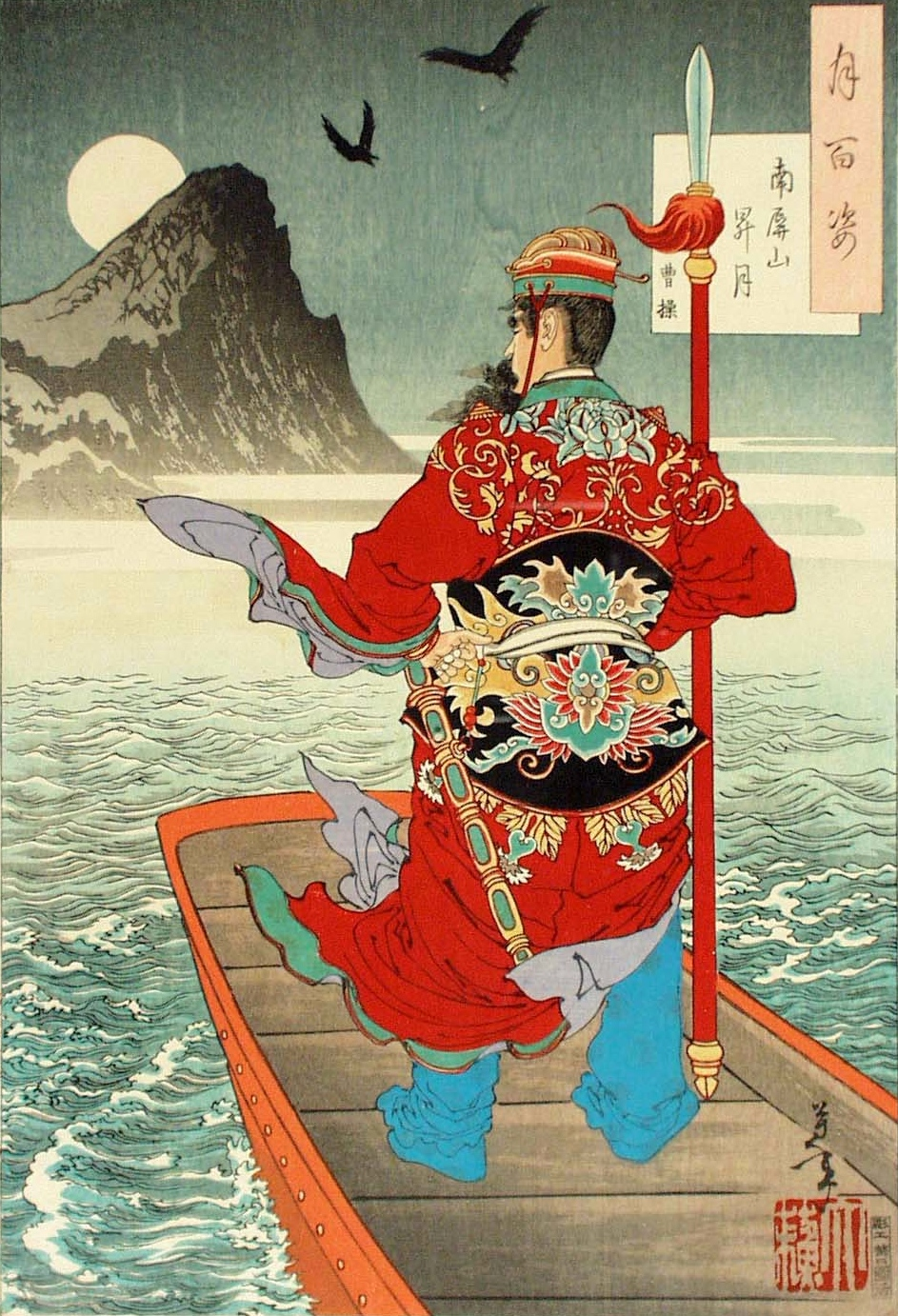
Cao Cao citing the Short Song Style while facing the rising moon at Mount Nanping. From Yoshitoshi's One Hundred Aspects of the Moon series of ukiyo-e woodblock prints

Another of Cao Cao's most well known poems is Short Song Style (短歌行), composed in the 210s.

短歌行

對酒當歌，人生幾何？
譬如朝露，去日苦多。
慨當以慷，憂思難忘。
何以解憂？唯有杜康。
青青子衿，悠悠我心。 (Note: Quotes from Classic of Poetry)
但為君故，沈吟至今。
呦呦鹿鳴，食野之蘋。
我有嘉賓，鼓瑟吹笙。
明明如月，何時可掇？
憂從中來，不可斷絕。
越陌度阡，枉用相存。
契闊談宴，心念舊恩。
月明星稀，烏鵲南飛，
山不厭高，海不厭深。
繞樹三匝，何枝可依？
周公吐哺，天下歸心。

Translation:
Short Song Style

I lift my drink and sing a song, for who knows if one's life is short or long?
Man's life is but the morning dew, past days many, future ones few.
The melancholy my heart begets, comes from cares I cannot forget
What can unravel these woes of mine? I know but one drink – Du Kang Wine.
"Collars in blue, my heart worries for you"
You are the cause of this song without pause
Across the banks a deer bleats, in the wilds where it eats
"Honoured guests I salute. Strike the harp! Play the flute!"
Bright is the moon's spark; When can it be grasped?
Thoughts of you from deep inside, never settle, never subside
Friends drop by via a country road, the respect they pay really show.
A long due reunion we fest, sharing past stories we possessed
Stars around the moons are few, southward the crows flew.
Circling the tree round and round; on what branch shall they nest?
Mountains weary not of their height, oceans weary not of their depth.
The sage pauses when guests call, so at his feet the empire does fall! (Note: Originally a reference to a story of the legendary Duke of Zhou. If guests arrived while the Duke was eating, he would spit out his food and meet them rather than have them wait for him. Later commentators praised this as a self-sacrificing attitude.)

== See also ==
- Chinese poetry
- Wen Xuan

== Bibliography ==
- Kotewall, Robert; Smith, Norman L. (1962). Davis, A. R. (ed.). The Penguin Book of Chinese Verse. Penguin Books.
- Burton Watson (1971). Chinese Lyricism: Shih Poetry from the Second to the Twelfth Century. Columbia University Press. ISBN 0-231-03464-4.
- Yip, Wai-lim (1997). Chinese Poetry: An Anthology of Major Modes and Genres. (Durham and London: Duke University Press). ISBN 0-8223-1946-2
