= Jian'an poetry =

Style of Chinese poetry

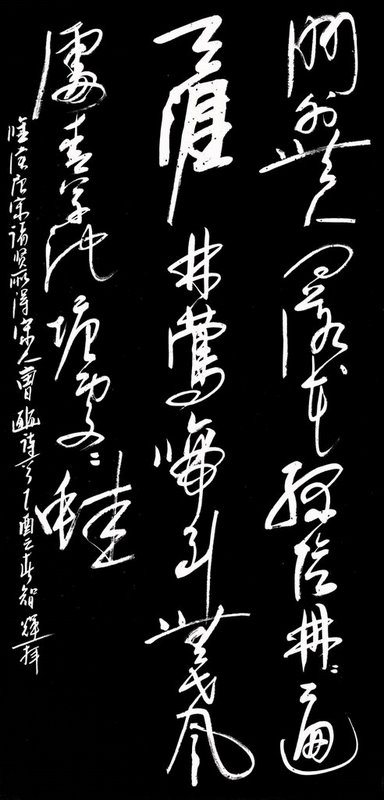
Picture of a poem attributed to Cao Bin, younger brother of Cao Zhen.

Jian'an poetry or Chien-an poetry (Chinese: 建安風骨), refers to the styles of Chinese poetry particularly associated with the end of the Han dynasty and the beginning of the Six Dynasties era of China. This poetry category is particularly important because, in the case of the Jian'an poetic developments, there is a special difficulty in matching the chronology of changes in poetry with the usual Chinese dynastic chronology based on the political leadership of the times. For example, according to Burton Watson, the first major poet of the new shi style that emerged at this time was Cao Zhi, one of the sons of Cao Cao, a family which came into power at the end of Han and developed further during the Three Kingdoms era of the Six Dynasties period.

== Time period ==
The term "Jian'an poetry" covers the final years at the end of the Han dynasty and during which the Cao family was rising, or risen, to prominence were known as the Jian'an era (196–220), the penultimate era of Emperor Xian: the following period is known as the Three Kingdoms era, due to the three kingdoms which divided up the Han dynasty, and war with one another for succession to the Han empire. A prominent Han dynasty general, Cao Cao effectively took control of the Han dynasty from the Liu imperial family, and following Cao Cao's death, his son Cao Pi formalized this by accepting the abdication of the last titular ruler of Han and establishing the Cao family as the ruling dynastic family of a new state, Wei (also known as Cao Wei), one of the Three Kingdoms which were successor states to the Han empire. Besides their role as leaders in war and politics, the Cao family also had an important role in the field of poetry and literature.

== Three Caos ==
Cao Cao and his sons Cao Pi and Cao Zhi are collectively known as the "Three Caos" of poetry. Along with several other poets, such as Xu Gan and the other Seven Scholars of Jian'an, their poems form the backbone of the jian'an style.

== Seven Scholars of Jian'an ==
"The Seven Scholars of Jian'an" was a name which Cao Pi came up with in an essay to describe seven major literati of the Jian'an era. Among them were Kong Rong (153–208), who was later executed by Cao Cao, along with his family: only a few of his poems survive. Wang Can (177–217), a poet known for his "Poem of Seven Sorrows" (七哀诗), a five-character poem which lamented how much the people suffered during the war years. Another is Chen Lin.

== Han poetry background ==
The poetry of the Han dynasty was in part characterized by the fu, sometimes referred to as a "rhapsody", which was a form of literature that in English could be considered either a form of poetry, a form of prose, or something in between. The typical Han fu is typically very long, describes a subject minutely from every possible angle, giving long and detailed lists of various categories of things and is usually meant more to display the poet's rhetorical and lexical skill than to express personal feeling. Another important aspect of Han poetry was the institution of the Music Bureau, a government organization originally charged with collecting or writing the lyrics. The Chinese name for the Music Bureau was yuefu; however, note that the use of fu in yuefu is different from the other Chinese term fu, which refers to a different type of poetry or literature using a different character. The developments in both of these forms of poetry in the Han dynasty help in the understanding of the work of the Jian'an poets.

== Developments ==
Jian'an poetry shows significant developments away from the detailed catalogs of the fu and toward the yuefu form of poetry; at the same time, the Jian'an poets developed the yuefu into a different form with a different voice, a form which was a direct predecessor to the major form of shi poetry later embraced by the Tang dynasty poets. In the major developments in terms of poetic voice, whereas Han poetry tended to use an anonymous voice which was either impersonal or in the mode of certain shallow and conventionalized characters, the Jian'an poetry tended to be more personal and immediately direct.

== See also ==
- Classical Chinese poetry
- Han poetry
- Poetry of Cao Cao
- Ruan Ji
- Seven Scholars of Jian'an
- Six Dynasties poetry
- The Quatrain of Seven Steps
- Xu Gan
