= Xiao Huangmen =

Role for a eunuch in the Han dynasty

The role of Xiao Huangmen (Chinese: 小黃門) was a role for a eunuch in the Han dynasty. The position, with a salary-rank of 600 shi or dan, (Note: During the Han dynasty, the power a government official exercised was determined by his annual salary-rank, measured in grain units known as dan (石 or shi, a unit of volume, approximately 35 litres (0.99 US bsh)). See Government of the Han dynasty#Salaries for further information.) involved delivering and receiving messages between the imperial palace apartments and the outside court.

A Xiao Huangmen's responsibilities were to follow the emperor, receive Shangshu memorials, preach the emperor's orders, and handle communication between the emperor and the harem inside and outside the palace.

The position's responsibilities and level of authority changed over time.

== Noted Xiao Huangmen ==
- Cai Lun (c. 50–121 CE)
- Ten Attendants (mid-second century CE)
- Cao Jie (fl.125–181 CE)

== Sources ==
- Bielenstein, Hans (1980). The Bureaucracy of Han Times. Cambridge: Cambridge University Press. ISBN 978-0-521-22510-6.
- de Crespigny, Rafe (2007). A Biographical Dictionary of Later Han to the Three Kingdoms. Leiden: Brill Publishers. ISBN 978-90-474-1184-0.
