= Wang Fu (eunuch) =

Chinese Han dynasty eunuch-official (died 179)

Wang Fu (Chinese: 王甫; died 31 May 179 CE) was a powerful eunuch in the court of Emperor Ling of Han. After Ling took the throne in 168 at the age of twelve, Dou Wu—father of the regent, Empress Dowager Dou Miao—sought to consolidate his power and neutralize that of the eunuch faction. So, together with Chen Fan, he drew up a list of four powerful eunuchs to be executed: Guan Ba, Su Kang, Cao Jie, and Wang Fu. But the list was discovered by another eunuch, Zhu Yu, resulting in a complete foiling of the plot and the subsequents death of Chen Fan and Dou Wu.

Later, in 172, when Empress Dowager Dou Miao died, an unknown vandal wrote on the palace door:

All that is under the heaven is in upheaval. Cao and Wang murdered the empress dowager. The key officials only know how to be officials and had nothing faithful to say.

This accusation angered the eunuchs referred to, Cao Jie and Wang Fu, who had more than 1,000 people arrested in an unsuccessful investigation to find the culprit.

Also in this year, Wang Fu falsely accused Prince of Bohai Liu Kui of treason after Liu failed to pay him promised bribes. The prince was forced to commit suicide and his entire household—wife, concubines, children, assistants, and principality officials—was executed. But thereafter, Wang Fu and his confederates were constantly concerned that if Empress Song, wife of Emperor Ling, gained more power at court, she would avenge the death of her aunt, the prince's consort. They therefore joined with the concubines to falsely accuse the empress of using witchcraft to take the emperor's life. This smear campaign eventually achieved its aim, and Empress Song died in 178 CE after being deposed.

In 179, Wang Fu was imprisoned in a case which implicated many eunuchs, including Cao Jie and Yuan She. He and his son Wang Meng (王萌) died under torture, while another son, Wang Ji (王吉), died in prison in Luoyang.
