= Wei Feng =

Eastern Han dynasty official (died 219)

- 魏諷

Personal details
- Born: Unknown: Pei County, Jiangsu or; Heze, Shandong
- Died: September or October 219
- Occupation: Government official
- Courtesy name: Zijing (子京)

Wei Feng (died September or October 219), courtesy name Zijing, was a government official who lived in the late Eastern Han dynasty of China.

== Life ==
The Wei Jin Shiyu (魏晋世語) claimed that Wei Feng was from Pei Commandery (沛郡; around present-day Pei County, Jiangsu), but Wang Chang's Jia Jie (家誡) recorded that he was from Jiyin Commandery (濟陰郡; around present-day Heze, Shandong). (Note: When annotating Cao Cao's biography in Sanguozhi, Pei Songzhi indicated that he didn't know which version of Wei Feng's origins was the correct one.) He was recruited into the Han civil service by Zhong Yao and he served as an Assistant in the West Bureau (西曹掾). Before that, he was already known for his talent throughout Ye (in present-day Handan, Hebei), the capital of Cao Cao's vassal kingdom of Wei (魏; covering parts of present-day Hebei and Henan).

While in office, Wei Feng acquainted himself with many others, including: two of Wang Can's sons; Liu Wei (劉偉), a younger brother of Liu Yi (劉廙); Chen Yi (陳禕), the Minister of the Guards of Changle (長樂衞尉). Also, before his rebellion, he had an excellent reputation, and many middle- and low- ranking officials were close friends of his. However, Liu Ye, upon seeing Wei for the first time, claimed that Wei will eventually rebel.

Around late September or October 219, when Cao Cao was away on a campaign against Liu Bei in Hanzhong, Wei Feng plotted a rebellion in Ye together with Chen Yi and others. However, before the plan was carried out, Chen Yi became afraid and he reported the plot to Cao Pi, Cao Cao's heir apparent, who was in charge of Ye during his father's absence. Wei Feng and his accomplices, numbering dozens, were arrested and executed. Those who were implicated include: Zhong Yao, who recommended Wei Feng, was dismissed from his position as the Chancellor (相國) of Cao Cao's vassal kingdom; Wang Can's two sons, who were executed; Liu Wei, who was also executed; Song Zhong's son; Zhang Xiu's son Zhang Quan (張泉) who was also executed (and his fief abolished and confiscated); Wen Qin, who was whipped but ultimately pardoned. At least three persons had foreseen that Wei Feng would rebel: Liu Yi, who cautioned his younger brother against befriending Wei Feng; Fu Xun; Liu Ye, who also accurately predicted that Meng Da would rebel. Yang Jun (楊俊), Cao Cao's Commandant (中尉) in Ye held himself responsible and sent a letter of resignation to Cao Pi, who had him transferred to Administrator of Pingyuan.

== See also ==
- Lists of people of the Three Kingdoms
- End of the Han Dynasty
