= Wang Can =

Chinese Han dynasty politician and poet (177-217)

- 王粲

Palace Attendant
- In office 213 – 217
- Monarch: Emperor Xian of Han
- Chancellor: Cao Cao

Personal details
- Born: 177 (Note: Wang Can's biography in the Sanguozhi recorded that he died at the age of 41 (by East Asian age reckoning) in the 22nd year of the Jian'an era (196-220) of the reign of Emperor Xian of Han. By calculation, Wang Can's year of birth should be 177. Cao Zhi recorded in his "Eulogy for Wang Zhongxuan" that Wang Can died on the 24th day of the 1st month of the 22nd year of the Jian'an era. This corresponds to 17 Feb 217 on the Julian calendar.) Weishan County, Shandong
- Died: 17 February 217 (aged 40)
- Children: Wang Ye (posthumous adopted son); two biological sons
- Parent: Wang Qian (father)
- Occupation: Politician, poet
- Courtesy name: Zhongxuan (仲宣)
- Peerage: Secondary Marquis (關內侯)

Wang Can
- Chinese: 王粲
Transcriptions
Standard Mandarin
- Hanyu Pinyin: Wáng Càn
- Wade–Giles: Wang^{2} Ts'an^{4}
- IPA: [wǎŋ tsʰân]
Yue: Cantonese
- Yale Romanization: Wòhng Chaan
- Jyutping: Wong^{4} Caan^{3}
Southern Min
- Tâi-lô: Ông Tshàn

Wang Can (177 – 17 February 217), courtesy name Zhongxuan, was a Chinese politician and poet who lived during the late Eastern Han dynasty of China. He contributed greatly to the establishment of laws and standards during the founding days of the vassal kingdom of Wei – the forerunner of the state of Cao Wei in the Three Kingdoms period – under the warlord Cao Cao, who was the de facto head of the Han central government in the final years of the Eastern Han dynasty. For his literary achievements, Wang Can was ranked among the Seven Scholars of Jian'an.

Wang Can was also renowned for his eidetic memory. The historical text Records of the Three Kingdoms described an incident where Wang Can was watching a game of weiqi. Someone accidentally knocked into the board and scattered the pieces. Wang Can then placed the pieces back to their original positions based on memory.

== Life ==
Wang Can was from Gaoping County (高平縣), Shanyang Commandery (山陽郡), which is around present-day Weishan County, Shandong. He was born in a family of high-ranking officials as a son of Wang Qian (王謙), a Chief Clerk (長史) to the general He Jin, who was briefly a regent for Emperor Shao in 189. Wang Can's great-grandfather Wang Gong (王龔), and grandfather Wang Chang (王暢) held offices among the Three Ducal Ministers during the reigns of Emperor Shun and Emperor Ling respectively. (Note: Volume 56 of Book of the Later Han had biographies of Wang Gong and Wang Chang.)

When the warlord and regent Dong Zhuo usurped power in 189, placing on the throne the puppet ruler Emperor Xian, Wang Can was merely 13 years old (by East Asian reckoning). A year later, Dong Zhuo moved the imperial capital from Luoyang to the more strategically secure Chang'an. Wang Can then headed to Chang'an, where he settled down for the next three years. In Chang'an, the prominent scholar and calligrapher Cai Yong recognised Wang Can's talent and recommended him to the civil service. Wang Can received several offers to serve in the government, but he turned down all of them.

In 194, Wang Can went to Jing Province (covering present-day Hubei and Hunan) to seek a position under the provincial governor, Liu Biao. (Note: According to Wang Chang's biography in Book of the Later Han, Liu Biao studied under Wang when he was 17 (by East Asian reckoning); Wang was Administrator of Nanyang (南阳太守) at the time.) However, Liu Biao did not favour Wang Can as the latter looked pallid and sickly. After Liu Biao died in 208, Wang Can persuaded his son and successor, Liu Cong, to surrender to Cao Cao, the warlord who controlled the Han central government at the time.

Wang Can's talents came to fruition during his service in Cao Cao's administration. In 213, after Emperor Xian enfeoffed Cao Cao as the Duke of Wei and granted him ten cities to form his dukedom, Cao Cao tasked Wang Can with establishing a new system of laws and standards to replace the old one, which had largely fallen into disuse. In late 216, Wang Can accompanied Cao Cao on his fourth campaign against a rival warlord, Sun Quan.

Wang Can died of illness on the way back to Ye city (in present-day Handan, Hebei) in the spring of 217 at the age of 41 (by East Asian age reckoning). Cao Cao's heir apparent, Cao Pi, attended Wang Can's funeral and told the guests, "When he was still living, Wang Can loved the sounds of a donkey braying, so let's each make a braying sound as a farewell to him". Every guest did that.

Wang Can had two sons, who were executed in 219 for participating in a rebellion led by Wei Feng against Cao Cao's government. Their deaths resulted in the termination of Wang Can's family line. However, Wang Ye (王業; courtesy name Zhangxu), a younger relative of Wang Can, (Note: Wang Zhangxu's father Wang Kai fled with Wang Can to Jingzhou. Due to Liu Biao's disdain of Can, Liu married his daughter to Kai instead. Also, the Wang Ye who betrayed Cao Mao was from Wuling Commandery.) was eventually designated as Wang Can's adopted son and heir to continue his family line. Wang Ye inherited about 10,000 volumes of Wang Can's books (including books from Cai Yong's collection) and passed them on to his own sons, Wang Bi and Bi's elder brother Wang Hong (Note: Wang Hong has a biography in vol.90 of Book of Jin.) (王宏).

== Literary achievements ==
Wang Can was an established poet. Along with six other poets of his time, their poems formed the backbone of what was to be known as the Jian'an style (建安風骨). They were collectively called the "Seven Scholars of Jian'an" (建安七子). "Jian'an" was the era name of Emperor Xian's reign from 196 to 220.

The civil strife towards the end of the Eastern Han dynasty gave the Jian'an poems their characteristic solemn yet heart-stirring tone, while lament over the ephemerality of life was also a central theme of works from this period. In the history of Chinese literature, the Jian'an poems were a transition from the early folk songs into scholarly poetry. One of the representative works by Wang Can is the Poem of Seven Sorrows (七哀诗), a five-character poem lamenting the suffering of the people during the years of war. Wang Can also wrote a contemporary history book called Records of Heroes (英雄記).

== Anecdotes ==
There are many anecdotes and stories related to Wang Can. It is recounted that when he was yet a youth, Cai Yong, then a high-ranking official, once saw him and was in awe. Later, Wang Can went to visit Cai Yong; although many guests of exalted rank were present, the host hastened to welcome the newcomer with the greatest deference, even wearing his shoes the wrong way in his haste. The others were astonished and asked why he was so respectful to a mere youth. "He is a young man with the highest gifts, which I cannot match. I shall grant him all the books and essays in my home," said Cai Yong. The Records of the Three Kingdoms stated that Wang Can was widely read and had a most retentive memory, better than any of his contemporaries. If he glanced at a roadside monument as he passed, he remembered every word of the inscription. If he saw people playing weiqi and the board was suddenly disturbed, he could replace every piece in its correct place.

Later, when Cao Cao was granted the Nine bestowments, many people were impressed by the imperial edict which accompanied the grant, and thought that Wang Can was the author. Sima Yi asked Wang to evaluate the literary skills of the edict's author; Wang replied that his own skills were not as good as the edict's author. Years later, after Sima had become Grand Tutor, at a banquet held during the Laba Festival, he met Pan Pu (潘蒲), son of the edict's author, Pan Xu (潘勖; uncle of Pan Yue). (Note: When annotating Wei Ji's (father of Wei Guan) biography in Records of the Three Kingdoms, Pei Songzhi cited the Wenzhang Zhi and Ni Bie Zhuan, which recorded that Pan Ni was a grandson of Pan Xu, while Pan Yue was a congfu of Pan Ni. It is likely that Pan Xu and Pan Yue's father Pan Pi were cousins.) As Sima revealed to Pan his admiration of Pan Xu's work and Wang Can's comments, only then did court officials know of the identity of the edict's author. (Note: The edict (册魏公九锡文) was included in vol.35 of Wen Xuan. Pan Xu was credited under his courtesy name Yuanmao (元茂).)

== See also ==
- Lists of people of the Three Kingdoms
- List of Chinese language poets
