= Chen Fan =

Chinese Han dynasty official (died 168)

- Traditional Chinese: 陳蕃
- Simplified Chinese: 陈蕃
Transcriptions
Standard Mandarin
- Hanyu Pinyin: Chén Fán

Chen Fan (90s (Note: There are differing accounts on when Chen Fan was born. His biography in Book of the Later Han recorded that he was in his 70s when he died. However, in Dou Wu's biography in the same work, it was recorded that Chen claimed to be 80 (by East Asian reckoning) in a dialogue with Dou. According to Zuo Xiong's (左雄) biography in Houhanshu and vol.51 of Zizhi Tongjian, he proposed in the 1st year of the Yangjia era (c.132) that nominated xiaolians below the age of 40 (by East Asian reckoning) needed to be tested more stringently; Chen Fan and Li Ying were among the 30-plus individuals who passed the stringent tests and were granted the position of langzhong (郎中). Since Chen was younger than 39 in 132, his birth year should be after 93. Also, if he was at least 70 in 168, his birth year should be in or before 98.) - 25 October 168 (Note: According to Liu Hong's biography in Book of the Later Han and vol.56 of Zizhi Tongjian, Chen Fan and Dou Wu, among others, were killed on the xinhai day of the 9th month of the 1st year of the Jianning era. This corresponds to 25 Oct 168 in the Julian calendar.)), courtesy name Zhongju (Chinese: 仲舉), was a Chinese politician of the Eastern Han dynasty. A native of Pingyu, Runan (north of present-day Pingyu County, Henan), Chen served as Grand Commandant (太尉) during the reign of Emperor Huan and later as Grand Tutor (太傅) in the first year of Emperor Ling's reign. He and Dou Wu (father of Empress Dowager Dou Miao) plotted against the eunuchs, but their plan was leaked; they were then both killed.

== Service under Emperor Shun ==
Chen Fan was nominated as xiaolian in c.132. In that year, the official Zuo Xiong (左雄) proposed that nominated xiaolians below the age of 40 (by East Asian reckoning) needed to be tested more stringently; Emperor Shun agreed. Chen Fan and Li Ying were among the 30-plus individuals who passed the stringent tests and were granted the position of langzhong (郎中).

== Service under Emperor Chong/Emperor Zhi ==
Between September 144 and July 146, while Li Gu was Grand Commandant, he recommended that Chen Fan be made an official. Soon after this appointment, Chen was reassigned as Administrator of Le'an.

== Service under Emperor Huan ==
In the 160s, (Note: As Xu Shao was around 18 years old when Chen Fan died in Oct 168, this anecdote most likely took place in the 160s.) when a teenage Xu Shao went to Yingchuan Commandery (潁川郡; covering present-day southern and central Henan), he visited and mingled with many reputable men in the region, except for Chen Shi. Later, when Chen Fan's wife died, many people attended her funeral, but Xu Shao did not show up. When asked, Xu Shao replied, "Taiqiu (Note: As Chen Shi was the mayor (長) of Taiqiu County (太丘縣), he was also known as Chen Taiqiu (陳太丘).) is too well-acquainted, it's difficult for him to be thorough; Zhongju is a serious person who hardly makes compromises. These are the reasons why I didn't visit them."

In July or August 165, Chen Fan was appointed Grand Commandant, replacing Yang Bing (杨秉; grandfather of Yang Biao), who had died on 18 June that year. He remained Grand Commandant until c.August 166; Emperor Huan found Chen's advice too uncomfortable so he relieved Chen of his position, citing that the officials Chen recommended were unsuitable for their positions.

== Service under Emperor Ling ==
Emperor Huan died without issue in January 168; on 30 January, Dou Wu was made General-in-Chief while Chen Fan was made Grand Tutor. In February, after Empress Dowager Dou consulted her father and Chen, Liu Hong, then Marquis of Jiedu Village (解瀆亭侯), was selected as the next emperor; he would posthumously be known as Emperor Ling.

At Chen Fan's urging, Dou Wu presented a memorial to the court in June 168 denouncing the leading eunuchs as corrupt and calling for their execution, but Empress Dowager Dou refused the proposal. This was followed by a memorial presented by Chen Fan calling for the heads of Hou Lan (d. 172 CE) and Cao Jie (d. 181 CE), and when this too was refused Dou Wu took formal legal action which could not be ignored by the court. When Shan Bing, a eunuch associate of Chen and Dou's, gained a forced confession from another eunuch that Cao Jie and Wang Fu (王甫) plotted treason, he prepared another damning written memorial on the night of 24–25 October which the opposing eunuchs secretly opened and read. Cao Jie armed Emperor Ling with a sword and hid him with his wet nurse, while Wang Fu had Shan Bing killed and Empress Dowager Dou incarcerated so that the eunuchs could use the authority of her seal.

Chen Fan entered the palace with eighty followers and engaged in a shouting match with Wang Fu, yet Chen was gradually surrounded, detained, and later trampled to death in prison that day (his followers were unharmed).

== See also ==
- Dou Wu
