= Cao Jie (eunuch) =

Chinese Han dynasty official (died 181)

- 曹節

Commandant of Equipage (奉車都尉)
- In office ?–?
- Monarch: Emperor Huan of Han

Minister of the Guards of Changle Palace (長樂衛尉)
- In office 168 – 169
- Monarch: Emperor Ling of Han

Empress's Chamberlain (大長秋)
- In office 169 – ?
- Monarch: Emperor Ling of Han

Prefect of the Masters of Writing (尚書令)
- In office 179 – 181
- Monarch: Emperor Ling of Han

Personal details
- Born: Unknown
- Died: 181
- Occupation: Court eunuch, politician
- Courtesy name: Hanfeng (漢豐)
- Peerage: Marquis of Yuyang (育陽侯)

Cao Jie
- Traditional Chinese: 曹節
- Simplified Chinese: 曹节
Transcriptions
Standard Mandarin
- Hanyu Pinyin: Caó Jié

Hanfeng (courtesy name)
- Traditional Chinese: 漢豐
- Simplified Chinese: 汉丰
Transcriptions
Standard Mandarin
- Hanyu Pinyin: Hànfēng

Cao Jie (fl.125–181), courtesy name Hanfeng, was a Chinese court eunuch and politician during the Eastern Han dynasty. He rose to power during the reign of Emperor Ling (r. 168–189). He was involved in a power struggle against a rival faction led by Dou Wu and Chen Fan during the reign of Emperor Huan (r. 146–168) and early reign of Emperor Ling. His son-in-law Feng Fang later became one of the 8 colonels of the Army of the Western Garden.

In the beginning of the 14th-century historical novel Romance of the Three Kingdoms, Cao Jie is listed as one of the Ten Attendants even though historically he was not a member of the group.

== Life ==
Cao Jie started serving as a xiao huangmen (小黃門) in the early reign of Emperor Shun (r. 125–144). He rose through the ranks and became a zhong changshi (中常侍) during the reign of Emperor Huan (r. 146–168). He also concurrently held the appointment of a fengche duwei (奉車都尉; Commandant of Equipage).

In 168, due to his efforts in helping to install Emperor Ling on the throne, he was enfeoffed as the "Marquis of Chang'an District" (長安鄉侯). As Emperor Ling was still underage, state affairs were overseen by Empress Dowager Dou (Emperor Huan's widow), General-in-Chief Dou Wu (the empress dowager's father), and Grand Tutor Chen Fan. Dou Wu and Chen Fan led a faction in the imperial court that was at odds with the eunuch faction represented by Cao Jie and others. When Cao Jie and the eunuch faction heard that Dou Wu and Chen Fan's faction were planning to eliminate them, they launched a coup against their rivals with the aid of Wang Fu (王甫), Zhu Yu (朱瑀), Gong Pu (共普), Zhang Liang (張亮) and others. Dou Wu and Chen Fan were arrested and executed, while Empress Dowager Dou was put under house arrest. After the coup, Cao Jie was promoted to "Minister of the Guards of Changle Palace" (長樂衛尉), in addition to having his marquis rank elevated to "Marquis of Yuyang (County)" (育陽侯) with a marquisate comprising 3,000 taxable households. His allies in the coup also received marquis titles and other honours from Emperor Ling.

In 169, Cao Jie was reassigned to be a zhong changshi (中常侍) again. Not long after, he was appointed da changqiu (大長秋; Empress's Chamberlain). In 172, when Empress Dowager Dou died while under house arrest, Cao Jie and Wang Fu tried to persuade Emperor Ling to hold an ordinary consort's funeral for the empress dowager instead of one that befitted her status, as well as not to bury her together with Emperor Huan. However, their attempt failed when two officials – Chen Qiu (陳球), the Minister of Justice (廷尉); and Li Xian (李咸), the Grand Commandant (太尉), – managed to convince Emperor Ling to hold an empress's funeral for the empress dowager and bury her beside Emperor Huan. In the same year, Cao Jie, Wang Fu and others framed Emperor Huan's younger brother, Liu Kui (劉悝), the Prince of Bohai (勃海王), for treason; Liu Kui committed suicide in prison. Emperor Ling rewarded Cao Jie and Wang Fu for exposing Liu Kui's "treachery" by increasing the number of taxable households in their marquisates. Their relatives were also appointed as officials in the Han government.

In 179, Cao Jie was promoted to Prefect of the Masters of Writing (尚書令). In that year, he was implicated in a case raised by official Yang Qiu (阳球); other eunuchs involved include Wang Fu and Yuan She. While Cao and Yuan survived, Wang died in prison. Cao died in 181 and was posthumously honoured with the appointment of General of Chariots and Cavalry (車騎將軍).
