= Seven Scholars of Jian'an =

Chinese intellectuals from the Eastern Han period

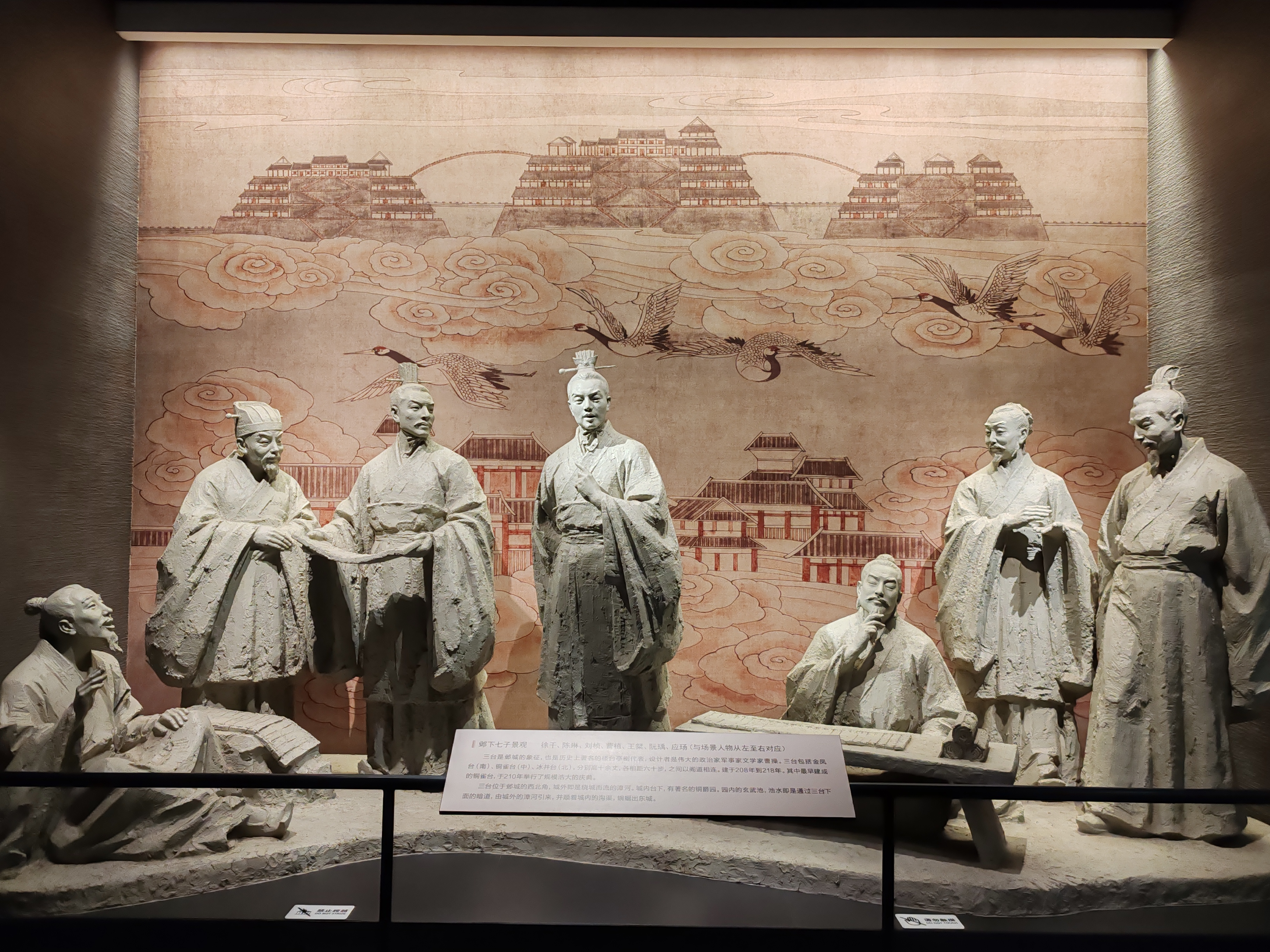
Seven Scholars of Jian'an

Seven scholars of Jian'an or Chien-an (Chinese: 建安七子), also translated as the "seven philosophers or masters of Jian'an", were a group of seven Chinese intellectuals of the late Eastern Han dynasty. The name was coined by Cao Pi. The Jian'an era was the era from 196–220 during the reign of Emperor Xian. Known as the time of unrest preceding the Three Kingdoms era, the period gained popularity in the East Asian culture.

The seven scholars are Wang Can, Chen Lin, Ruan Yu (阮瑀), Liu Zhen (劉楨), Xu Gan, Ying Yang (應瑒), and Kong Rong.

Ruan Yu was the father of Ruan Ji, one of the Seven Sages of the Bamboo Grove.

== See also ==
- Jian'an poetry
- Yuefu
- Cao Zhi
- Cao Cao
