= Dou Miao =

Empress of China from 165 to 168

Dou Miao (Chinese: 竇妙; died 18 July 172), formally Empress Huansi (literally, "the diligent and deep-thinking empress"), was an empress during the Han dynasty. She was the third wife of Emperor Huan. After his death in January 168, she served as regent for his successor Emperor Ling, assisted by her father Dou Wu and the Confucian scholar Chen Fan (陳蕃). Dou and Chen had a major confrontation with powerful eunuchs later in 168 and were defeated and killed. After that, she was under house arrest until her death.

== Family background and marriage to Emperor Huan ==
It is not known when Dou Miao was born. Her father Dou Wu was a low-level official during Emperor Huan's administration and a well-known Confucian scholar; he also came from a background of nobility, as a descendant of Dou Rong (竇融), (Note: Dou Wu's father Dou Feng (竇奉) was a great-grandson of Dou Rong) who had contributed much to the restoration of the Han dynasty under Emperor Guangwu. Not much is known about her mother's family background.

In 165, around the time that Emperor Huan deposed his second wife, Empress Deng Mengnü, Dou Miao became an imperial consort. However, Emperor Huan did not favor her. Later that year, though, when selecting a new empress, she was considered. Emperor Huan wanted to create his favorite, Consort Tian Sheng (田聖), empress, but officials, led by Chen, opposed due to Consort Tian's low birth. Rather, they pressured Emperor Huan to create Consort Dou empress. He gave in to pressure and created her empress later that year, on 10 December. Her father was promoted to a series of posts with increasing importance.

In 166, during the first Disaster of the Partisan Prohibitions (黨錮之禍), Dou Wu interceded on behalf of the officials who were accused of wrongdoing by the powerful eunuchs and the university students who had been arrested for petitioning on their behalf, and his intercession helped to prevent them from being executed. Because of this, Dou Wu and Empress Dou were viewed by the officials as hopes for overthrowing the powerful eunuchs eventually.

== As empress dowager and regent ==
In January 168, Emperor Huan died without a son. Empress Dou became empress dowager and regent. She and her father examined the potential successors within the imperial Liu clan, and they settled on the 12-year-old Liu Hong (劉宏), the Marquess of Jieduting, and he ascended the throne as Emperor Ling. Empress Dou continued to serve as regent. She trusted Chen and her father Dou Wu, and gave them great power.

Hateful that Consort Tian had Emperor Huan's greatest affection, Empress Dowager Dou had her executed, even before Emperor Huan could be buried.

As regent, Empress Dowager Dou appeared to be diligent and paid attention to many important matters, including the suppression of Qiang revolts. She supported the program of the general Duan Jiong (段熲) to suppress the Qiang with overwhelming force, and he was successful (Note: However, Duan was criticized for being overly cruel during this campaign; perhaps Lady Dou herself should shoulder some responsibility as well.); this was the end of Qiang rebellions during the Han dynasty.

== Dou and Chen's confrontation with the eunuchs ==
After they became the leading officials, Dou and Chen did much to try to clean up government; in particular, they recalled the officials who had been victims of the first Disaster of Partisan Prohibitions and gave them authority to try to stamp out corruption, particularly by the clans of the powerful eunuchs.

The eunuchs tried to counter this by flattering Empress Dowager Dou constantly, and Empress Dowager Dou became more trusting of them as the days went by, particularly Cao Jie (曹節) and Wang Fu (王甫). Chen and Dou Wu became alarmed, and they began to set up a plan to exterminate the powerful eunuchs. In the summer of 168, they approached Empress Dowager Dou with the plan, and Empress Dowager Dou was surprised and opposed it—reasoning that an extermination plan was unfair to those who had not committed offenses. With her opposition, the plan was delayed.

In autumn of that year, the eunuchs discovered the plan and became enraged. Zhu Yu (朱瑀), the first eunuch to discover the plan, formed a conspiracy with 17 eunuchs to strike back at Chen and Dou. They quickly took Emperor Ling into custody (claiming to him—which he believed—for his own protection) and issued edicts executing the military commanders who supported Chen and Dou, and then kidnapped Empress Dowager Dou. They then sent forces to capture Chen and Dou. Chen was quickly captured and executed, while Dou publicly declared that the eunuchs were rebelling and put on a resistance. The eunuchs tricked the general Zhang Huan (張奐) into believing that Dou Wu was in fact committing treason, and Zhang defeated Dou in battle. Dou killed himself after defeat, and the Dou clan was slaughtered, except that his wife was exiled to Bijing (比景, in modern northern Vietnam). Empress Dowager Dou was put under house arrest, although maintaining her title of empress dowager.

== Late years ==
Empress Dowager Dou was never able to regain any real power, as the eunuchs controlled the political scene for years. Her position of influence was effectively taken by Emperor Ling's mother Empress Dowager Dong. Zhang, who had been tricked into defeating her father, repeatedly tried to get her released, but was unable to do so. In 171, the eunuch Dong Meng (董萌) also tried to speak on her behalf with Emperor Ling, claiming that she was innocent of wrongdoing, and Emperor Ling initially believed him, and therefore repeatedly visited Empress Dowager Dou and supplied her with many things. This led Cao and Wang to despise him, and they falsely accused him of defaming Empress Dowager Dong; Dong Meng was imprisoned and executed.

In 172, Empress Dowager received news that her mother had died in exile, and she became depressed and ill herself. She died in the summer of that year. The powerful eunuchs so hated the Dous that they had her body placed on a wagon for transporting luggage and exposed to the elements for a few days, and eventually wanted to bury her with the honors only due an imperial consort. At Emperor Ling's insistence, she was still buried with the ceremony of an empress dowager, with her husband Emperor Huan.

== Notes ==
Chinese royalty
Preceded by Empress Deng Mengnü	Empress of the Eastern Han dynasty 165–168	Succeeded by Empress Song
