= Kong Rong =

Chinese poet and politician (151/153–208)

- 孔融
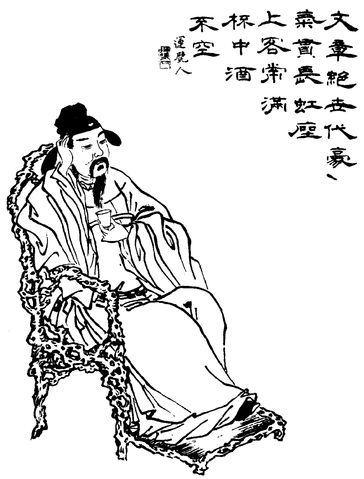
- A Qing dynasty illustration of Kong Rong

Palace Counsellor (太中大夫)
- In office ? – 208
- Monarch: Emperor Xian of Han

Minister Steward (少府)
- In office ?–?
- Monarch: Emperor Xian of Han

Court Architect (將作大匠)
- In office 196 – ?
- Monarch: Emperor Xian of Han

Chancellor of Beihai (北海相)
- In office 189 – 196
- Monarch: Emperor Xian of Han

Personal details
- Born: 151/153 Qufu, Shandong
- Died: 26 September 208 (aged 55 or 57) Xuchang, Henan
- Occupation: Poet, politician, warlord
- Courtesy name: Wenju (文舉)
- Other name(s): Kong Beihai (孔北海)

Kong Rong
- Chinese: 孔融
Transcriptions
Standard Mandarin
- Hanyu Pinyin: Kǒng Róng
- Gwoyeu Romatzyh: Koong Rong
- Wade–Giles: K'ung^{3} Jung^{2}
- IPA: [kʰʊ̀ŋ ɻʊ̌ŋ]
Yue: Cantonese
- Yale Romanization: Húng Yùhng
- Jyutping: Hung^{2} Jung^{4}
Southern Min
- Tâi-lô: Khóng Iông

Kong Rong (151/153 – 26 September 208), courtesy name Wenju, was a Chinese poet, politician, and minor warlord who lived during the late Eastern Han dynasty of China. He was a 20th generation descendant of Confucius. As he was once the Chancellor of Beihai State, he was also known as Kong Beihai. He was defeated by Yuan Tan in 196 and escaped to the capital Xuchang. For being a political opponent of Cao Cao and humiliating him on multiple occasions, Kong Rong was eventually put to death on various charges.

Famed for his quick wits and elaborate literary style, Kong Rong was ranked among the Seven Scholars of Jian'an, a group of representative literati of his time. However, most of his works had been lost. Those that survived can be found in compilations from the Ming and Qing dynasties.

A well-known story commonly used to educate children – even in contemporary times – on the values of courtesy and fraternal love involves a four-year-old Kong Rong giving up the larger pears to his older and younger brothers. This story, commonly known as "Kong Rong giving up pears" (孔融讓梨), is also mentioned in the Three Character Classic, a text used for elementary education since the Song dynasty.

== Early life and career ==
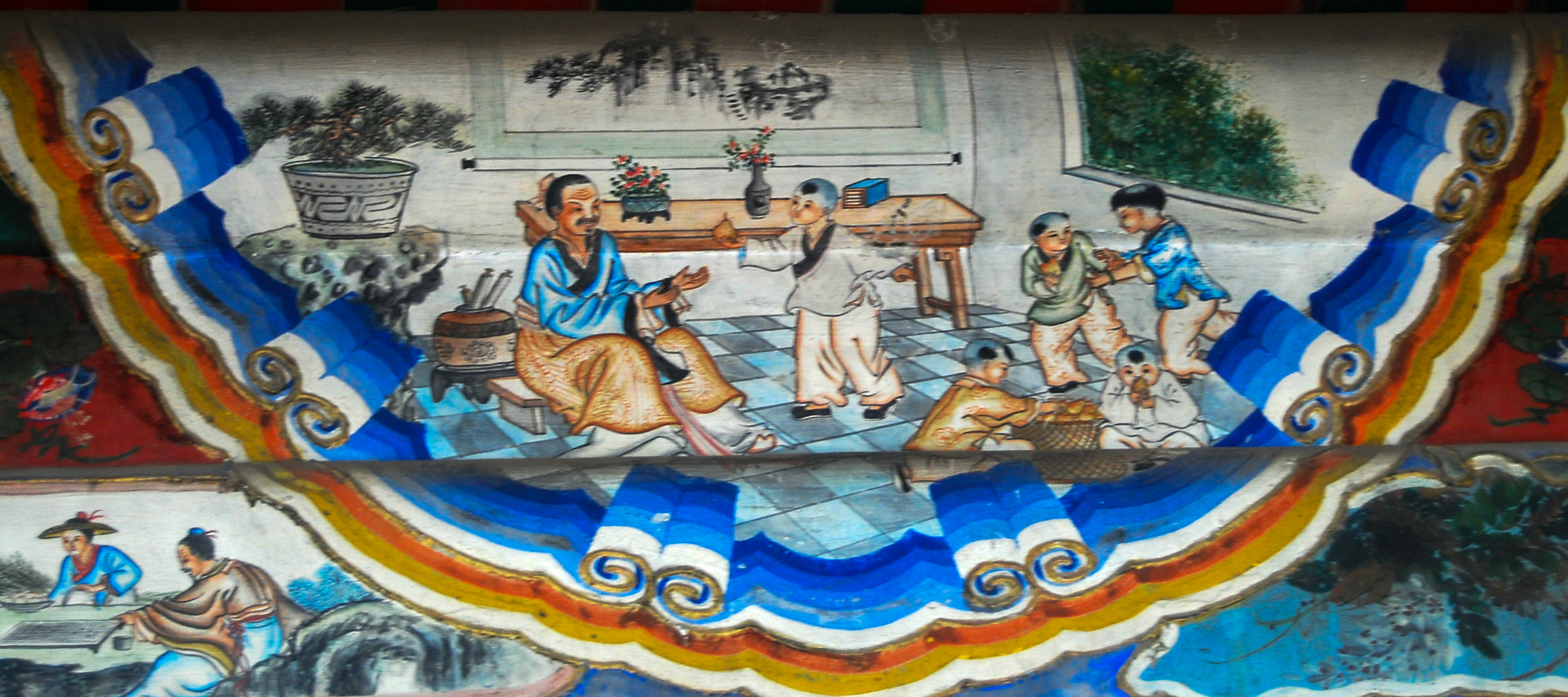
Kong Rong giving up pears. Portrait at the Long Corridor of the Summer Palace, Beijing

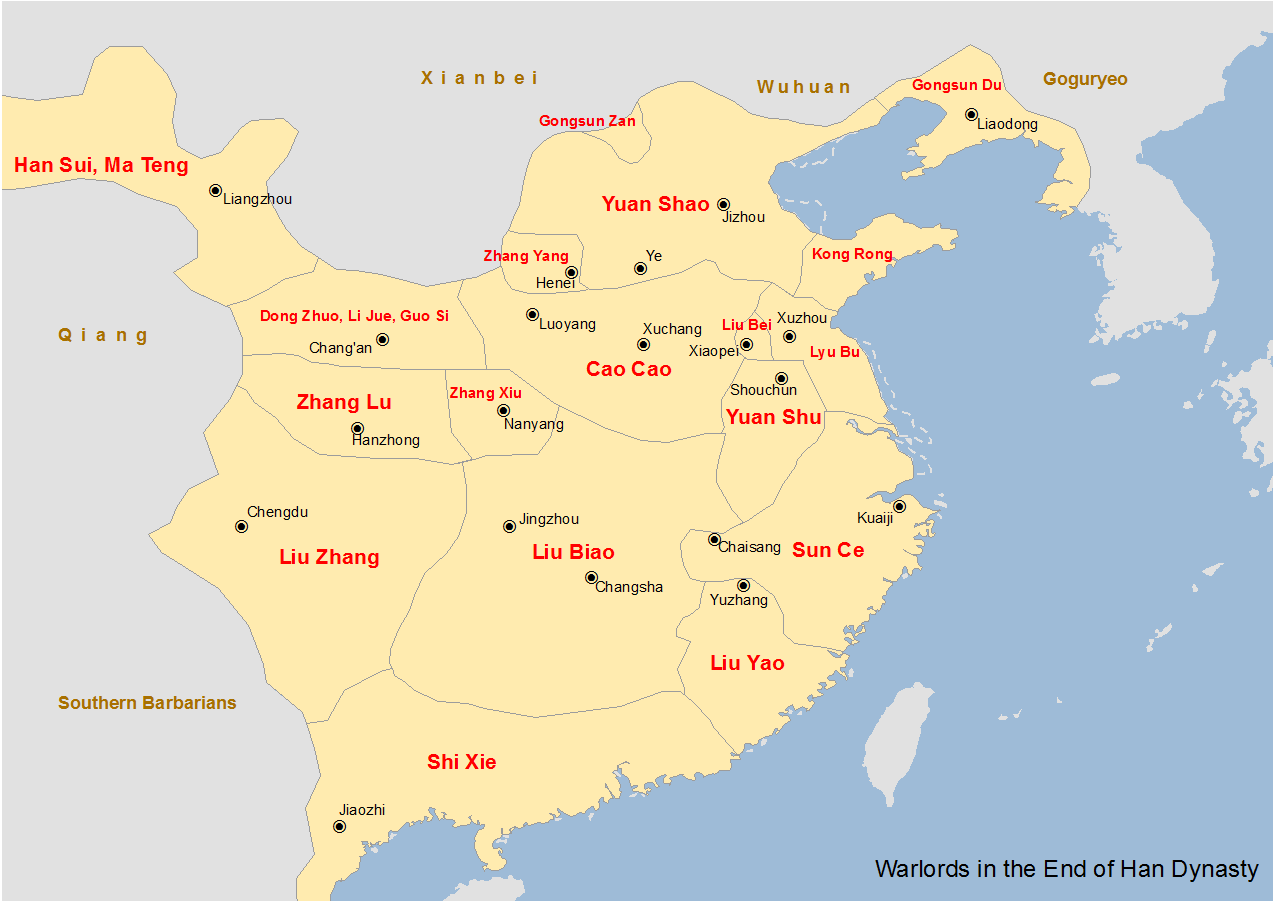
Map showing the major warlords of the Han dynasty in the 190s, including Kong Rong

Born in the former Lu state (present-day southern Shandong and northern parts of Henan, Anhui and Jiangsu), Kong Rong showed quick wit from a young age. His father was Kong Zhou. According to the Epilogue of Han (續漢書) by Sima Biao (司馬彪), when he was a teenager, Kong Rong paid a visit to an official named Li Ying, who received no one but the very eminent and his own relatives. Claiming to be a relative, Kong Rong was brought before Li Ying, who asked how they were related. Kong Rong answered that his ancestor Confucius was a student and friend of Laozi (whose family name was said to be Li (李)). However, another guest present was not impressed, commenting that a person who showed great ability at a young age might not grow up to be especially capable. Kong Rong immediately retorted, "I suppose you were really smart when you were young." Li Ying laughed at this and predicted the child would grow up to be a great man.

When he grew older, Kong Rong entered the bureaucracy of the Eastern Han dynasty. He was successively promoted and in 190 was appointed Chancellor of Beihai State, situated in Qing Province, the area most heavily contested by the Yellow Turban rebels during the 180s. Upon taking up office, Kong Rong concentrated on reconstruction of the city and the establishment of schools. He promoted Confucian studies and provided proper burial for deceased refugees who had no family members to look after their funeral affairs. During this time, he was besieged by a remnant Yellow Turban army led by Guan Hai (管亥). Kong Rong sent Taishi Ci to seek help from Liu Bei, then the Prefect of Pingyuan County. Taishi Ci returned with 3,000 elite troops, whereupon the rebels dispersed. In 195, through Liu Bei's nomination, Kong Rong was further promoted to be the Inspector of Qing Province.

=== Stay in Xuchang ===
The next year, however, the warlord Yuan Shao sent his eldest son Yuan Tan to attack Qing Province. Kong Rong was defeated and his family was captured. He escaped to the capital Xuchang, where he was subsequently appointed Minister Steward (少府). During his stay in Xuchang, Kong Rong often opposed policies of the warlord Cao Cao, who controlled Emperor Xian and the Han central government. When Cao Cao imposed a ban on alcohol due to crop shortage, Kong Rong wrote to him saying, "Since the kings Jie and Zhou (the last rulers of the Xia dynasty and Shang dynasty respectively) were overthrown due to their desire for women, why don't you ban marriage as well?" Kong Rong was then stripped of his official post but soon reinstated, albeit to a titular position. However, because of his hospitality, his house was always filled with guests.

During this time Kong Rong befriended Mi Heng of Jing Province (present-day Hubei and Hunan). Despite being very learned, Mi Heng was unconventional and unconstrained. Upon reaching Xuchang, he wrote a prose piece putting down every eminent person there. When asked whom he would consider talented, Mi Heng replied, "First there is Kong Rong, second there is Yang Xiu." Kong Rong wanted to recommend Mi Heng to Cao Cao, but Mi put up a rude and arrogant attitude in front of Cao. First, he undressed while playing a drum at a feast hosted by Cao Cao, and criticized Cao loudly outside his doors. Cao Cao eventually sent Mi Heng to Liu Biao, the Governor of Jing Province.

In 198, Cao Cao was gearing up for an encounter with Yuan Shao along the shores of the Yellow River. Kong Rong held a pessimistic view, telling Cao Cao's adviser Xun Yu that Yuan Shao would be extremely difficult to defeat as he had ample food supplies, far superior troop strength and many capable and loyal subjects. However, Cao Cao took advantage of Yuan Shao's weaknesses and eventually defeated him at the Battle of Guandu in 200. Yuan Shao died two years later, leaving his eldest and youngest sons, Yuan Tan and Yuan Shang, to contest his legacy.

In 204, Cao Cao defeated Yuan Shang then conquered the city of Ye and massacred his population. The women of the Yuan household were often raped and his son Cao Pi married the wife of Yuan Xi, Lady Zhen. When Kong Rong heard of this, he wrote Cao Cao a letter, falsifying a parallel in ancient history, claiming King Wu of Zhou arranged marriage between his brother the Duke of Zhou and the beautiful consort Daji, lately the favourite of the defeated king Di Xin, and legendarily blamed for the downfall of the Shang dynasty. Thinking that Kong Rong was citing a classic text to praise him, Cao Cao asked about the source, but Kong merely said, "I saw what happened in our day and thought it must have been so."

=== Death ===
In 208, Kong Rong spoke ill of Cao Cao before an emissary from Sun Quan, a warlord who ruled the territories in the Jiangdong region. Cao Cao then ordered Kong Rong to be executed on various charges including, among others, "plotting a rebellion", "slandering the imperial court" and "disrespecting court protocol". According to the Spring and Autumn Annals of Wei (魏氏春秋) by Sun Sheng (孫盛), Kong Rong's two eight-year-old sons (a nine-year-old son and a seven-year-old daughter according to the Book of Later Han) were playing a game of weiqi when their father was arrested. When others urged them to escape, they answered:

How could there be unbroken eggs under a toppled nest? (安有巢毀而卵不破者乎)

This later became a Chinese idiom (覆巢之下，安有完卵), used to describe that when a group suffers, all individuals belonging to it will be affected. An alternate but similar story could also be found in A New Account of the Tales of the World by Liu Yiqing (劉義慶), which is written in a more elaborate style.

After Kong Rong was executed along with his entire family, his body was left in the streets. Not a single official who used to be close to him dared to collect the corpses for burial except Zhi Xi (脂習), who came to Kong Rong's body and cried, "Now you have left me for death, whom could I talk to who would understand me?"

== Literary achievements ==
Although he did not meet with much success in politics, Kong Rong was considered a leading literary figure of his time, famed for his prose as well as poetry. Along with six other poets of his time, their poems formed the backbone of what was to be known as the Jian'an style, named for the Jian'an Era of the Xian Emperor's rule between 196 and 220. Collectively they were known as the Seven Scholars of Jian'an. Civil strife towards the end of the Han dynasty gave the Jian'an poems their characteristic solemn yet heart-stirring tone, while lament over the ephemerality of life was also a central theme of works from this period. In the history of Chinese literature, the Jian'an poems were a transition between early folksongs and scholarly poetry.

Kong Rong's literary skills, however, were often thought to be elaborate and empty show without sound content. Cao Pi commented in his A Discourse on Literature (典論) that Kong Rong's words cannot sustain discourse and surpassed reasoning, so much so that they almost seem like mere sarcasm or mockery.

After Kong Rong's death, Cao Pi collected 25 of his poems and included them in A Discourse on Literature. However, most of these were lost and only five survive till this day, two of which are of unverified authenticity. Nine volumes containing Kong Rong's prose under the Book of Sui (隋書) have also been lost. Those that survive are found in compilations from the Ming and Qing dynasties. These include several epistles that Kong Rong wrote to Cao Cao in criticism of his policies.

== See also ==
- Lists of people of the Three Kingdoms
