= Dou Wu =

Chinese Han dynasty politician and scholar (died 168)

- Traditional Chinese: 竇武
- Simplified Chinese: 窦武
Transcriptions
Standard Mandarin
- Hanyu Pinyin: Dòu Wǔ

Dou Wu (Chinese: 竇武; died 25 October 168), courtesy name Youping (游平), was a Chinese philosopher and politician of the Eastern Han dynasty. He was known as a Confucian scholar and served as a low-level official during the reign of Emperor Huan until his daughter Dou Miao was elevated from imperial consort to empress, which caused him to be promoted, eventually to become one of the most important imperial officials when his daughter became empress dowager and regent for Emperor Ling. He, along with Chen Fan, attempted to curb the eunuchs' power and install Confucian scholars in imperial government, but after a plot by him and Chen to exterminate the most powerful eunuchs was discovered, he was defeated in battle and committed suicide.

== Career under Emperor Huan ==
Dou Wu's father Dou Feng (竇奉) was a great-grandson of Dou Rong (竇融), who contributed much to Emperor Guangwu's campaign to re-establish the Han dynasty. Dou Feng was the Administrator (太守) of Dingxiang (定襄) Commandery. When Dou Wu was young, he became known for his scholarship in Confucian classics and was famous for it in the areas west of Dasan Pass, but was not involved in politics.

That changed in 165 when his daughter Dou Miao was selected to be an imperial consort, as an eligible woman from an honored clan. Because of this, Emperor Huan made Dou Wu a low level official. Later that year, after Empress Deng Mengnü was deposed, the imperial officials all favored Consort Dou to be the new empress due to Dou Wu's reputation, and Emperor Huan gave in to their wishes although he personally did not favor Consort Dou. She was created empress later that year. Dou Wu was promoted to be the commander of the capital (Luoyang) defense forces and created a marquess.

In 167, during the height of the first Disaster of Partisan Prohibition (in which Confucian officials and their university student supporters were accused to be "partisans" scheming against the emperor), Dou Wu interceded on the partisans' behalf, requesting leniency and at the same time tendering his resignation (which Emperor Huan did not accept). It was with his intercession and that of Huo Xu (霍謣) that Emperor Huan did not execute any of the partisans, although he did strip their civil liberties. Dou Wu, in the meantime, also recommended several scholars who were not accused to be partisans for important posts.

== Career during his daughter's regency and death ==
In January 168, Emperor Huan died without an heir. Empress Dou became empress dowager and regent. She consulted her father and Chen Fan with regard to who would be the new emperor. They eventually decided on the 12-year-old Liu Hong (劉宏), the Marquess of Jieduting. In February that year, he became emperor (as Emperor Ling). Empress Dowager Dou continued to serve as regent.

With Empress Dowager Dou as regent, Dou Wu and Chen became the most important officials in the imperial government. Dou Wu was given a larger march, while his son and two nephews were also created marquesses. As a reaction to this, Lu Zhi, then still a civilian with no official post, wrote to Dou Wu, advising him to reject the rewards; Dou ignored him.

Dou and Chen recalled the partisans and made many of them important officials. Meanwhile, though, they became concerned that the emperor and the empress dowager were being surrounded by eunuchs, the ladies in waiting, and Emperor Ling's wet nurse Zhao Rao (趙嬈), who flattered them and were trusted by them. Chen and Dou therefore started a plot to exterminate all of the powerful eunuchs. When Dou Wu presented the plan to his daughter, however, she refused—reasoning that not all of the powerful eunuchs deserved death. Dou Wu therefore sought to execute four—Guan Ba (管霸), Su Kang (蘇康), Cao Jie (曹節), and Wang Fu (王甫). As Empress Dowager Dou was still pondering this proposal, another eunuch, Zhu Yu (朱瑀), while Dou Wu was on vacation, opened up Dou Wu's proposal and found out that Dou Wu proposed a mass extermination plan and became enraged. He gathered 17 other eunuchs and took Emperor Ling into custody (managing to persuade him that they did it for his own protection) and kidnapping Empress Dowager Dou. They then sent forces to arrest Dou Wu and Chen. Chen was quickly captured and killed, but Dou gathered his forces and resisted. The eunuchs tricked the general Zhang Huan (張奐; father of Zhang Zhi), who was battle tested as the former commander of the northern border defense forces, into believing that Dou was committing treason, and Zhang led his forces to defeat Dou Wu. After defeat, Dou Wu committed suicide, and his entire clan was slaughtered. Empress Dowager Dou lost power and was put under house arrest ever since. However, Dou Wu's young grandson Dou Fu was saved.
