= Xu Gan =

Chinese philosopher and poet (171–218)

- Traditional Chinese: 徐幹
- Simplified Chinese: 徐干
Transcriptions
Standard Mandarin
- Hanyu Pinyin: Xú Gàn

Weichang (courtesy name)
- Traditional Chinese: 偉長
- Simplified Chinese: 伟长
Transcriptions
Standard Mandarin
- Hanyu Pinyin: Wěicháng

Xu Gan (Chinese: 徐幹, pinyin Xú Gàn, 171 – March or April 218?), courtesy name Weichang (偉長), was a Chinese philosopher, poet and official of the late Eastern Han dynasty, and one of the "Seven Scholars of Jian'an". He is best known in the West for his discourse on the relationship between the names and actualities, preserved in his treatise Zhonglun (中論), or "Balanced Discourses".

== Life ==
Born in Ju County, Beihai Commandery (east of present-day Lechang, Shandong), Xu Gan developed a reputation for good memory and diligent studies as a youth. Around 189, Xu Gan left his residence in Linzi and went into hiding on the Jiaodong peninsula.

However, his work's introduction, written from the viewpoint of a reverent disciple, suggests his exile more self-imposed for the sake of Confucianist study. He seems to have been familiar with the "Legalists", but is not that unusual for his time and advocated that reward and punishment should be consistent rather than extreme, fitting alongside his other "Balanced Discourses."

It has been suggested that his writing were directed at Cao Cao. After participating in Cao Cao's campaigns, the Records of the Three Kingdoms state that he was appointed magistrate of Shanghai, but did not serve. He did serve as Minister of Works, from 197-208, and literary advisor until 211.

== Literature ==
- John Makeham, Name and Actuality in Early Chinese History. State University of New York Press, Albany, 1994.

== Translations ==
- Balanced Discourses: a Bilingual Edition. English translation by John Makeham; Introductions by Dan Shengyuan and John Makeham. Yale University Press, 2002.
