= Battle of Xiapi =

Battle between warlord Lü Bu and warlords Cao Cao and Liu Bei (198-199)

- Part of the wars at the end of the Han dynasty
Date	Winter of 198 (Note: The 10th month of the 3rd year of the Jian'an era starts from 17 Nov 198 in the Julian calendar.) to 7 February 199 (Note: The Zizhi Tongjian recorded that Lü Bu surrendered to Cao Cao on the guiyou day of the 12th month of the 3rd year of the Jian'an era of the reign of Emperor Xian of Han. He was executed on the same day. This date corresponds to 7 February 199 in the Julian calendar.)
Location	Xiapi, Xu Province (present-day Pizhou, Jiangsu, China) 34°20′32″N 118°00′35″E
Result	Decisive Cao Cao and Liu Bei victory, Lü Bu executed

Belligerents
Forces of Cao Cao and Liu Bei	Forces of Lü Bu

Commanders and leaders
Cao Cao; Liu Bei; Xiahou Dun; Yu Jin; Xu Huang; Yue Jin; Guo Jia; Xun You; Zhang Fei	Lü Bu (executed); Gao Shun (executed); Zhang Liao (surrendered); Cheng Lian (POW); Chen Gong (executed); Hou Cheng (surrendered); Zang Ba (surrendered)
- Location within Jiangsu Battle of Xiapi (China)

Battle of Xiapi
- Traditional Chinese: 下邳之戰
- Simplified Chinese: 下邳之战
Transcriptions
Standard Mandarin
- Hanyu Pinyin: Xiàpī Zhī Zhàn

The Battle of Xiapi was fought between the forces of Lü Bu against the allied armies of Cao Cao and Liu Bei from the winter of 198 to 7 February 199 towards the end of the Eastern Han dynasty in China. The battle concluded with victory for Cao Cao and Liu Bei, with Lü Bu being subsequently executed.

== Background ==
In 194, while Cao Cao was away attacking Tao Qian in Xu Province, his subordinates Chen Gong and Zhang Miao rebelled against him and aided Lü Bu in invading his base in Yan Province. Cao Cao abandoned his invasion of Xu Province and turned back to attack Lü Bu, culminating in the Battle of Yan Province which lasted more than 100 days. By 195, Cao Cao had retaken all his cities in Yan Province and defeated Lü Bu at Juye. Lü Bu and his men fled east to join Liu Bei, who had succeeded Tao Qian as Governor (州牧) of Xu Province.

In 196, Cao Cao found Emperor Xian in the ruins of Luoyang and brought him to Xuchang, where the new capital and imperial court would be based. In the same year, Lü Bu took advantage of the conflict between Liu Bei and Yuan Shu to capture Xiapi (present-day Pizhou, Jiangsu), capital of Xu Province, effectively seizing control of the province from Liu Bei. Liu Bei was forced to surrender his governorship of Xu Province to Lü Bu and settle in the nearby city of Xiaopei. Not long later, Lü Bu felt threatened by Liu Bei's presence and led his troops to attack Liu. Liu Bei was defeated by Lü Bu and had no choice but to join Cao Cao. Cao Cao provided Liu Bei with supplies and sent him to garrison at Xiaopei.

Around 197, Yuan Shao was in control of the three provinces of Ji, Qing and Bing north of the Yellow River, so he wrote a letter to Cao Cao in an arrogant tone. Around the same time, Cao Cao had just been defeated by Zhang Xiu at the Battle of Wancheng and the letter angered him. Cao Cao felt threatened by Yuan Shao's growing influence in northern China and wanted to attack Yuan, but felt that his forces were not strong enough. Cao Cao's strategists Guo Jia and Xun Yu assessed the situation, listing out the various advantages Cao Cao had over Yuan Shao. They also advised him to use the opportunity to eliminate Lü Bu when Yuan Shao was at war with Gongsun Zan, because it was possible that Yuan Shao might ally with Lü Bu to attack him. Cao Cao then made preparations for a campaign against Lü Bu.

== Battle ==
=== Conflict between Lü Bu and Yuan Shu ===
In 197, Yuan Shu declared himself emperor and sent his subordinate Han Yin (韓胤) to meet Lü Bu, proposing a political marriage between his son and Lü Bu's daughter, so as to foster a stronger alliance between him and Lü Bu. Lü Bu initially agreed to the proposal and sent his daughter to follow Han Yin back. However, Lü Bu still bore a grudge against Yuan Shu for attacking him five years before, so he changed his mind after listening to Chen Gui. Lü Bu pursued the convoy and retrieved his daughter, captured Han Yin, and sent him to Xuchang, where Han was executed on Cao Cao's order. Cao Cao appointed Lü Bu as General of the Left (左將軍) and personally wrote him a letter to console him. Lü Bu sent Chen Deng to meet Cao Cao and thank Cao on his behalf. When Chen Deng met Cao Cao, he said that Lü Bu was bold but not very astute, and was untrustworthy, so he should be eliminated as soon as possible. Cao Cao agreed with Chen Deng's view. Chen Deng was appointed Administrator of Guangling and secretly implanted by Cao Cao as a spy in Lü Bu's forces.

On the other hand, Yuan Shu was angered by Lü Bu's betrayal, so he sent his generals Zhang Xun (張勳) and Qiao Rui (橋蕤) to lead an army to attack Xiapi from seven directions in collaboration with the White Wave Bandits led by Han Xian and Yang Feng. Lü Bu was in a disadvantageous situation, with only 3,000 men and 400 warhorses. He was afraid that he might not be able to resist Yuan Shu so he blamed Chen Gui for giving him poor counsel. Chen Gui, however, thought that Han Xian and Yang Feng were not genuinely loyal to Yuan Shu, so he advised Lü Bu to persuade them to break their alliance with Yuan Shu. When Lü Bu attacked Yuan Shu's forces, Han Xian and Yang Feng defected to his side. Yuan Shu's troops were defeated and Lü Bu pursued them until he reached south of the Huai River.

=== Siege of Xiapi ===
In 198, Lü Bu made peace with Yuan Shu again, and sent his general Gao Shun to attack Liu Bei at Xiaopei. Cao Cao sent Xiahou Dun with an army to reinforce Liu Bei, but they were still defeated by Gao Shun. Xiaopei fell to Lü Bu's forces in October 198 and Liu Bei escaped, but his wives were captured.

Following that, Cao Cao officially launched his military campaign against Lü Bu. When Cao Cao's army reached Pengcheng (present-day Xuzhou, Jiangsu), Chen Gong urged Lü Bu to attack Cao Cao because Cao Cao's troops were weary from their long march from Xuchang. Lü Bu, however, insisted on staying in Xiapi and wait for Cao Cao to arrive before attacking. At the same time, however, Chen Deng defected to Cao Cao's side and led his men from Guangling to join Cao Cao, then they attacked and conquered Pengcheng. After this, Lü Bu personally led his troops out to engage the enemy but was defeated and forced to retreat. Lü Bu returned to Xiapi and defended the city firmly without advancing.

Cao Cao wrote a letter to Lü Bu, explaining the perilous situation the latter was in. Lü Bu became afraid and had the intention of surrendering, but Chen Gong felt that Cao Cao's army had travelled a long distance and would not be able to fight a prolonged battle. Chen Gong advised Lü Bu to garrison part of his forces outside the city, while the rest would remain with him inside, so that they can support each other if either side came under attack. Chen also said the best time to engage Cao Cao's forces would be months later, when Cao's supplies run out. Lü Bu agreed with the plan and wanted to leave Chen Gong and Gao Shun behind to defend Xiapi while he was stationed outside the city. However, Lü Bu's wife claimed that Chen Gong and Gao Shun could not get along with each other, so that would be a problem if Lü Bu was not around. She also felt that Cao Cao treated Chen Gong better (before the latter's defection to Lü Bu) than how Lü Bu was treating Chen now, so Chen might betray Lü Bu. Lü Bu thus aborted Chen Gong's plan.

Lü Bu sent Wang Kai (王楷) and Xu Si (許汜) to request reinforcements from Yuan Shu, but Yuan refused when he recalled how Lü Bu reneged on the marriage proposal earlier. Wang Kai and Xu Si attempted to persuade Yuan Shu to send aid, claiming that Yuan Shu would be isolated if Lü Bu was eliminated. Yuan Shu considered sending relief forces, but did not do so immediately. In the meantime, Lü Bu thought that Yuan Shu was unwilling to help him because of the marriage proposal incident, so he personally escorted his daughter out of Xiapi and attempted to send her to Yuan Shu's territory. However, Lü Bu encountered Cao Cao's troops outside the city and was unable to break out of the siege, so he had to turn back.

Cao Cao's troops began to become tired and weary after failing to capture Xiapi despite besieging it for a long time. Cao Cao had the intention of withdrawing, but his strategists Xun You and Guo Jia thought that Lü Bu's army was already low on morale after having suffered so many defeats and defections, so they advised Cao Cao to press on with the siege. Cao Cao then ordered his soldiers to direct the waters of the Yi and Si Rivers to flood Xiapi. The beleaguered Lü Bu prepared to surrender after Xiapi was flooded for over a month, but Chen Gong stopped him.

=== Lü Bu's surrender ===
Lü Bu's general Hou Cheng found a man to help him take charge of 15 horses, but the man escaped with the horses, planning to present them to Liu Bei. Hou Cheng personally pursued the man and retrieved the horses. The other generals congratulated Hou Cheng on his achievement and Hou prepared food and wine and presented to Lü Bu. Lü Bu was furious and said, "I ordered a ban on alcohol, and now you prepare wine. Are you planning to make me drunk and then turn against me?" Hou Cheng was unhappy and afraid, so on 7 February 199 he plotted with Song Xian (宋憲) and Wei Xu (魏續) to capture Chen Gong and Gao Shun before surrendering to Cao Cao.

When Lü Bu heard about Hou Cheng's defection, he led his remaining men to White Gate Tower, where he saw that Cao Cao's troops were closing in on him. He asked his men to kill him and bring his head to Cao Cao, but they refused. Lü Bu then surrendered.

== Aftermath ==
Lü Bu and his followers were tied up and brought before Cao Cao and Liu Bei. Lü Bu complained that he was too tightly bound but Cao Cao said, "A feral tiger should be tightly tied up." Lü Bu then attempted to persuade Cao Cao to spare him and promised to serve Cao. As Cao Cao was pondering, Liu Bei said, "Haven't you seen what happened to Ding Yuan and Dong Zhuo?" Cao Cao rubbed his jaw. Lü Bu scolded Liu Bei, "You're the most untrustworthy person." The Yingxiong Ji (英雄記; Records of Heroes) stated that Cao Cao initially wanted to spare Lü Bu's life after Lü pledged to serve him. However, Wang Bi (王必), Cao Cao's registrar, immediately stopped Cao Cao and said, "Lü Bu is a formidable prisoner-of-war. His subordinates are nearby, he cannot be spared." Cao Cao then said to Lü Bu, "I wanted to spare you, but my registrar refuses. So, what should I do?"

When Cao Cao asked Chen Gong what would happen to his family members, Chen hinted that Cao should spare them. Cao Cao spared Chen Gong's family and treated them well. Chen Gong then accepted his fate and walked to the execution ground without looking back. Cao Cao was deeply grieved by Chen Gong's death. Cao Cao had Lü Bu executed by hanging. He tried to convince Gao Shun to join him, having heard of his skill as both a general and a warrior, however Gao Shun would not and was killed as well. Cao Cao ordered the dead bodies of Lü Bu, Chen Gong, Gao Shun and others to be decapitated and their heads sent to Xuchang and then later buried.

Cao Cao accepted Zhang Liao, Chen Qun and others who previously served Lü Bu, and appointed them as generals or officials under him. Other minor warlords such as Zang Ba, Sun Guan (孫觀), Wu Dun (吳敦), Yin Li, and Chang Xi (昌豨) who used to side with Lü Bu also surrendered to Cao Cao, and he put them in charge of various commanderies along the coastline.

With the end of the Battle of Xiapi, Cao Cao completely eliminated the threat posed by Lü Bu. The following year, Liu Bei broke ties with Cao Cao and seized control of Xu Province after killing Che Zhou (車冑), but Cao Cao quickly defeated Liu and regained control of the province. With Xu Province now firmly in his control, Cao Cao no longer had any impending threats on his home base in Yan and Yu provinces. This became an advantage to Cao Cao in the subsequent Battle of Guandu in 200 against Yuan Shao.

== Order of battle ==
=== Cao Cao and Liu Bei forces ===
- Cao Cao
  - Xun You
  - Guo Jia
  - Xiahou Dun
    - Han Hao
- Liu Bei
  - Guan Yu
  - Zhang Fei

=== Lü Bu forces ===
- (surrendered) Lü Bu, executed
  - Chen Gong, executed
  - Gao Shun, executed
  - (surrendered) Hou Cheng
  - (surrendered) Song Xian (宋憲)
  - (surrendered) Wei Xu (魏續)
  - Cheng Lian (成廉)

== In Romance of the Three Kingdoms ==
The battle was romanticised in chapters 18–19 of the historical novel Romance of the Three Kingdoms by Luo Guanzhong. Some fictional events were added, while actual ones were modified to large extents for dramatic effect. In the novel, the battle took place in two stages: the first took place near Xiaopei, while the second was at Xiapi itself.

Some notable events in the novel's account of the battle are as follows:

=== Xiahou Dun losing his left eye ===
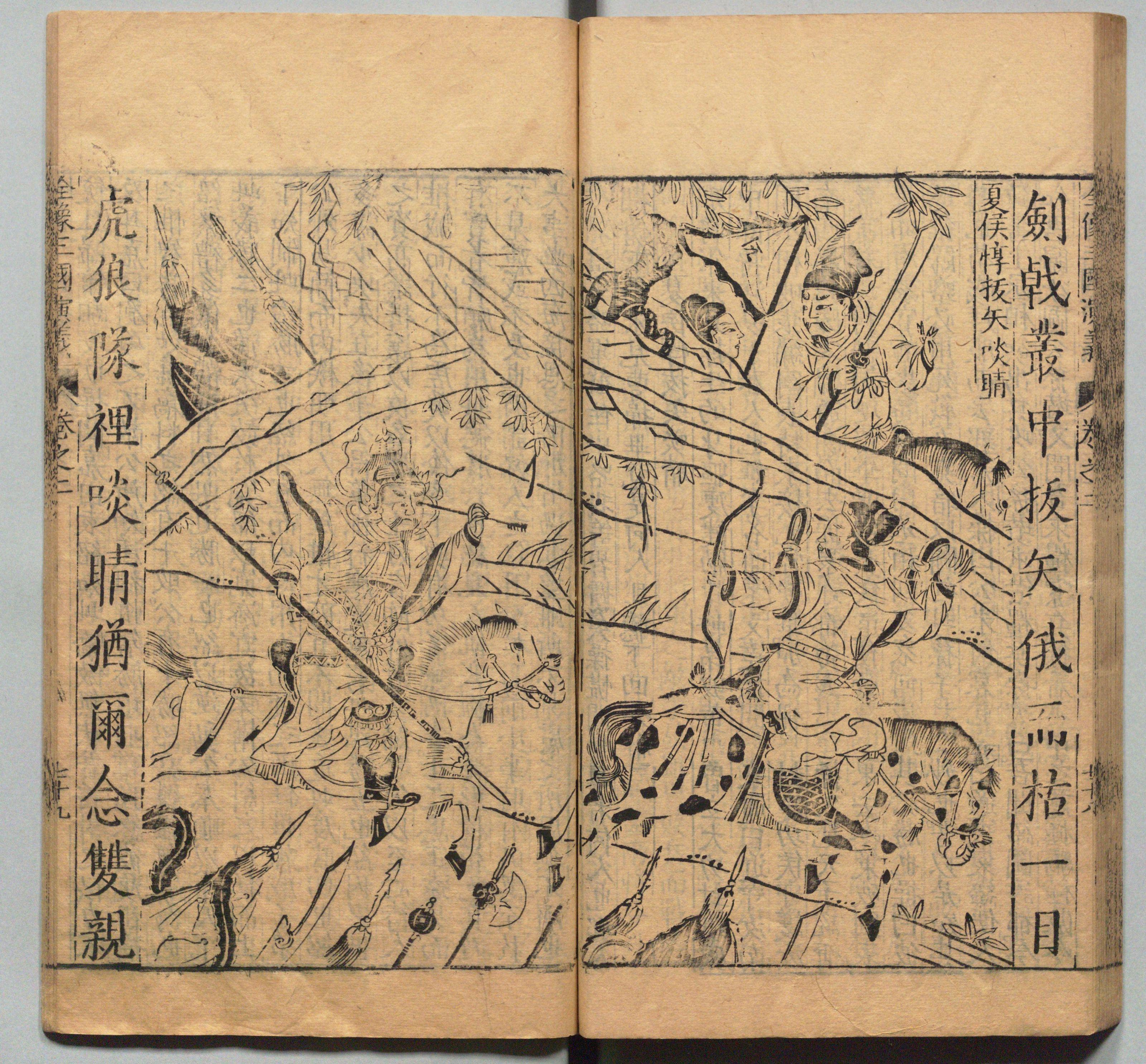
Ming dynasty woodblock illustration of Xiahou Dun being shot in the eye with an arrow.

Cao Cao sent Xiahou Dun to lead reinforcements to help Liu Bei, who was under attack by Lü Bu at Xiaopei. When Xiahou Dun arrived, he encountered Lü Bu's army led by Gao Shun, and he engaged Gao in a one-on-one fight. Both of them duelled for about 40–50 rounds. Gao Shun could not hold on any longer so he retreated, with Xiahou Dun in pursuit.

Lü Bu's subordinate Cao Xing spotted Xiahou Dun on the battlefield, and he fired an arrow that hit Xiahou in his left eye. Xiahou Dun cried out and pulled out the arrow together with his eyeball. He exclaimed, "(This is) the essence of my father and the blood of my mother, (I) cannot waste it!" He then swallowed his eyeball and charged towards Cao Xing. Cao Xing was caught off guard and was killed by Xiahou Dun, who speared him in the face. The soldiers from both sides were shocked by the scene before them.

Historicity

Xiahou Dun's biography in the Sanguozhi mentioned briefly when Xiahou Dun participated in a battle against Lü Bu's forces, he was hit by a stray arrow and was injured in his left eye. No further details were provided. The Weilüe stated that after the incident, the soldiers nicknamed Xiahou Dun "Blind Xiahou". Xiahou Dun hated that nickname and when he saw his reflection in a mirror, he would knock it onto the ground.

The only record of Cao Xing in history exists in the Yingxiong Ji (英雄記; Records of Heroes), which stated that when Hao Meng rebelled against Lü Bu in 196, Hao's subordinate Cao Xing refused to join him in the rebellion. Hao Meng and Cao Xing fought, and Cao was injured by Hao but he managed to slice off Hao's arm. Hao Meng was later killed by Gao Shun. Lü Bu later praised Cao Xing for remaining loyal to him.

=== Hou Cheng's defection ===
This incident took place when Lü Bu was besieged by Cao Cao's forces in Xiapi for months. His subordinate Hou Cheng seized back 15 horses stolen from them and Lü Bu's men wanted to celebrate. Hou Cheng feared that Lü Bu might be angry because the latter had already banned his men from consuming alcohol, so Hou presented five bottles of wine to his lord. However, Lü Bu was furious and he wanted to have Hou Cheng executed, but Song Xian (宋憲), Wei Xu (魏續) and others pleaded with Lü Bu to spare Hou Cheng. Lü Bu agreed and had Hou Cheng flogged 50 times before releasing him. Lü Bu's men were all upset by the incident. Hou Cheng later plotted with Song Xian and Wei Xu to betray Lü Bu. That night, Hou Cheng stole Lü Bu's steed, the Red Hare, and fled to Cao Cao's camp. He told Cao Cao about their plan.

Historicity

The Sanguozhi stated that Lü Bu's followers were starting to become disunited after Lü Bu had been besieged in Xiapi by Cao Cao's forces for about three months. His generals Hou Cheng, Song Xian and Wei Xu captured Chen Gong and brought their men to surrender to Cao Cao. The Jiuzhou Chunqiu gave a similar account of the story in Romance of the Three Kingdoms, except that Lü Bu did not have Hou Cheng flogged when the latter presented wine to him. Instead, Hou Cheng became afraid after Lü Bu scolded him and threatened to execute him, so he discarded the wine and returned to join the other generals. He later became suspicious of Lü Bu and eventually led his men to surrender to Cao Cao. Lü Bu's biography in the Houhanshu combined the original text in the Sanguozhi and the Jiuzhou Chunqiu account, stating that Hou Cheng and others captured Chen Gong and Gao Shun and surrendered to Cao Cao.

=== Lü Bu's final moments ===
Lü Bu was resting when his subordinates Song Xian and Wei Xu captured him and tied him up. They threw his ji down the walls and opened the gates for Cao Cao's forces to enter. Lü Bu was brought before Cao Cao and he complained that he was too tightly bound, but Cao Cao said, "A tiger must be tied up securely." Lü Bu then said to Hou Cheng, Wei Xu and Song Xian, "I treated all of you well, why do you betray me?" Song Xian replied, "(You) listen to your wives and concubines and ignore our advice. You call this 'treating us well'?" Lü Bu remained silent. Cao Cao then had Gao Shun executed after Gao did not reply when Cao asked him if he had anything to say. He wanted to spare Chen Gong but the latter insisted on accepting his fate and was executed as well. Lü Bu attempted to persuade Cao Cao to spare him, saying that he was willing to serve under Cao Cao and help him conquer the empire. When Cao Cao asked Liu Bei for his opinion, Liu replied, "Haven't you seen what happened to Ding Yuan and Dong Zhuo?" Lü Bu glared at Liu Bei and said, "You're the most untrustworthy person!" As he was being dragged away, Lü Bu turned back and shouted at Liu Bei, "Big eared fellow! Have you forgotten the incident when I fired an arrow through the ji?" Cao Cao then had Lü Bu executed by hanging and his dead body decapitated.

Historicity

The Sanguozhi stated that Lü Bu surrendered when he saw that he had been surrounded, instead of him being captured by his own subordinates who had betrayed him. His final words, said to Cao Cao and Liu Bei moments before his death, were similar to those mentioned in the Romance of the Three Kingdoms. Cao Cao then had Lü Bu hanged. He ordered Lü Bu's dead body to be decapitated and the head sent to the capital Xuchang and later had it buried. Lü Bu's biography in the Houhanshu mentioned that Lü Bu asked his subordinates to take his head and surrender to Cao Cao when he saw that he had been surrounded by Cao's forces. However, his subordinates were unwilling to do so, hence they surrendered together. The rest of the account is similar to that in the Sanguozhi and its annotations.

=== Zhang Liao's surrender ===
When Zhang Liao was captured and brought before Cao Cao after the battle, he scorned Lü Bu for his cowardly behaviour. He showed no fear and even remarked that Cao Cao was lucky to have survived the blaze at Puyang (referring to an earlier battle in which Cao was almost killed). Cao Cao was furious and he drew his sword and wanted to kill Zhang Liao, but Guan Yu and Liu Bei stopped him and pleaded with him to spare Zhang. Guan Yu even knelt down. Cao Cao laughed, sheathed his sword, and said, "I also know Wenyuan (Zhang Liao's courtesy name) is a loyal and righteous man. I was just testing him." He then personally released Zhang Liao from his bonds, took off his coat and wrapped it around Zhang, and offered him a seat. Zhang Liao was moved by Cao Cao's sincerity so he submitted to Cao.

Historicity

The Sanguozhi did not mention anything about this incident. It just simply stated that Zhang Liao surrendered to Cao Cao and was commissioned as a "General of the Household" (中郎將) and received the title of a "Secondary Marquis" (關內侯). It also remains unknown whether he did participate in the Battle of Xiapi or not.

== In popular culture ==
The Battle of Xiapi is featured in Koei's video game series Dynasty Warriors as a playable stage from the fourth instalment onwards.
