= Gao Shun =

General serving warlord Lü Bu (died 199)

Gao Shun 高順
- Born: Unknown
- Died: 7 February 199; Pizhou, Jiangsu
- Occupation: Military General

Gao Shun
- Traditional Chinese: 高順
- Simplified Chinese: 高顺
Transcriptions
Standard Mandarin
- Hanyu Pinyin: Gāo Shùn
- Wade–Giles: Kao Shun

Gao Shun (died 7 February 199) (Note: The Zizhi Tongjian recorded that Lü Bu surrendered to Cao Cao on the guiyou day of the 12th month of the 3rd year of the Jian'an era of the reign of Emperor Xian of Han. He was executed on the same day along with Gao Shun and Chen Gong. This date corresponds to 7 February 199 in the Gregorian calendar.) was a military officer serving the warlord Lü Bu during the late Eastern Han dynasty of China. Although he only had 700 men under his command, his unit was nicknamed as the "camp crusher (or formation breaker)" (陷陣營) for its destructive charges. Gao came to be known as Lü Bu's most able commander. His noted accomplishments included conquest of Peicheng (沛城) and the subsequent victory over a combined force led by Xiahou Dun and Liu Bei. In the same year, however, Cao personally laid siege to Lü Bu's base in Xiapi, and defeated and captured Lü Bu. Gao was then executed along with his lord.

== Life ==
According to Pei Songzhi's annotation in Chen Shou's Records of the Three Kingdoms, Gao Shun, from Shangdang Commandery, was a stern and incorrupt man, with an air of authority and few words. As an unblemished and pure person, Gao refused alcohol and undue gifts. It is also stated in Records of Heroes (英雄記) by Wang Can that he only commanded 700 men, but his men were considered equivalent to a thousand, and they were a well-equipped, well-trained, and disciplined elite force. Whenever his battalion fought, they were always successful of breaking into enemy formation, and could perform well, even if surrounded by enemies, so they were collectively called the "camp crusher".

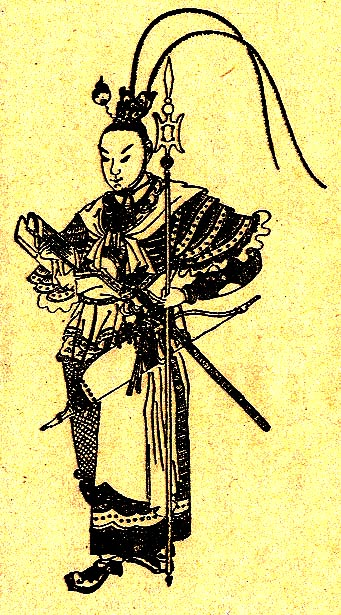
A Qing dynasty illustration of Lü Bu

Zang Ba, the head of the bandit leaders around Mount Tai, attacked and defeated the Chancellor of Langye, Xiao Jian, at Ju County. He then seized Xiao Jian's treasure and provisions, and promised to present them to Lü Bu. When he reneged on his words, however, Lü went to ask for the goods himself. Gao objected: "Your authority and reputation are known and respected everywhere. How can you ask for something and fail to obtain it? Yet you are going in person to beg for a present. If for some reason you are not successful, you will surely lose face." The rapacious Lü could not heed Gao's advice. Indeed, Zang turned Lü Bu down, and the Bandits of Mount Tai no longer listened to Lü's orders.

One night in 196, a subject of Lü Bu named Hao Meng rebelled. Hao ordered his troops to surround the government office of Xiapi, where Lü Bu resided. The startled Lü had to climb over the wall of a toilet and escape to the camp of Gao Shun. Lü told Gao that the leader of the rebels has a Henei accent, and Gao Shun says that it must be Hao Meng. Gao then led a force to quell the rebellion. By the next morning, Hao Meng and his troops had all been forced to retreat back to their own camp. Cao Xing, a subordinate of Hao Meng, turned on Hao Meng and the two duelled. Cao Xing was injured in the fight but cleaved an arm off of Hao Meng. Gao Shun had also identified the rebels, and arrived at the scene to finish off Hao Meng (who was a man from Henei or captain of the Henei soldiers).

Although Lü knew Gao was very loyal, his advice was not always welcome. Furthermore, Lü trusted Gao even less after the incident of Hao Meng. Lü stripped Gao of his commission and reassigned his troops to Wei Xu (魏續), who was Lü's relative. Whenever there was a battle, however, Gao would be reinstated. Despite this treatment, he remained eternally loyal and never bore a grudge against his lord.

Lü, whose actions were seldom consistent, made decisions hastily. For that, Gao often remonstrated him by saying, "When you start something, you never think of the details. Whenever there is a choice between the way to success or the possibility of failure, you always make the wrong decisions!" Gao went on and said, "Those who lost their homes and states did not do so because they lacked loyal ministers and wise advisers. They did so because they wouldn't listen to those men. General, you are reluctant to think things through carefully before you act, and thus you commit mistakes, which are too many to count." Lü appreciated his loyalty, yet could not follow his advice.

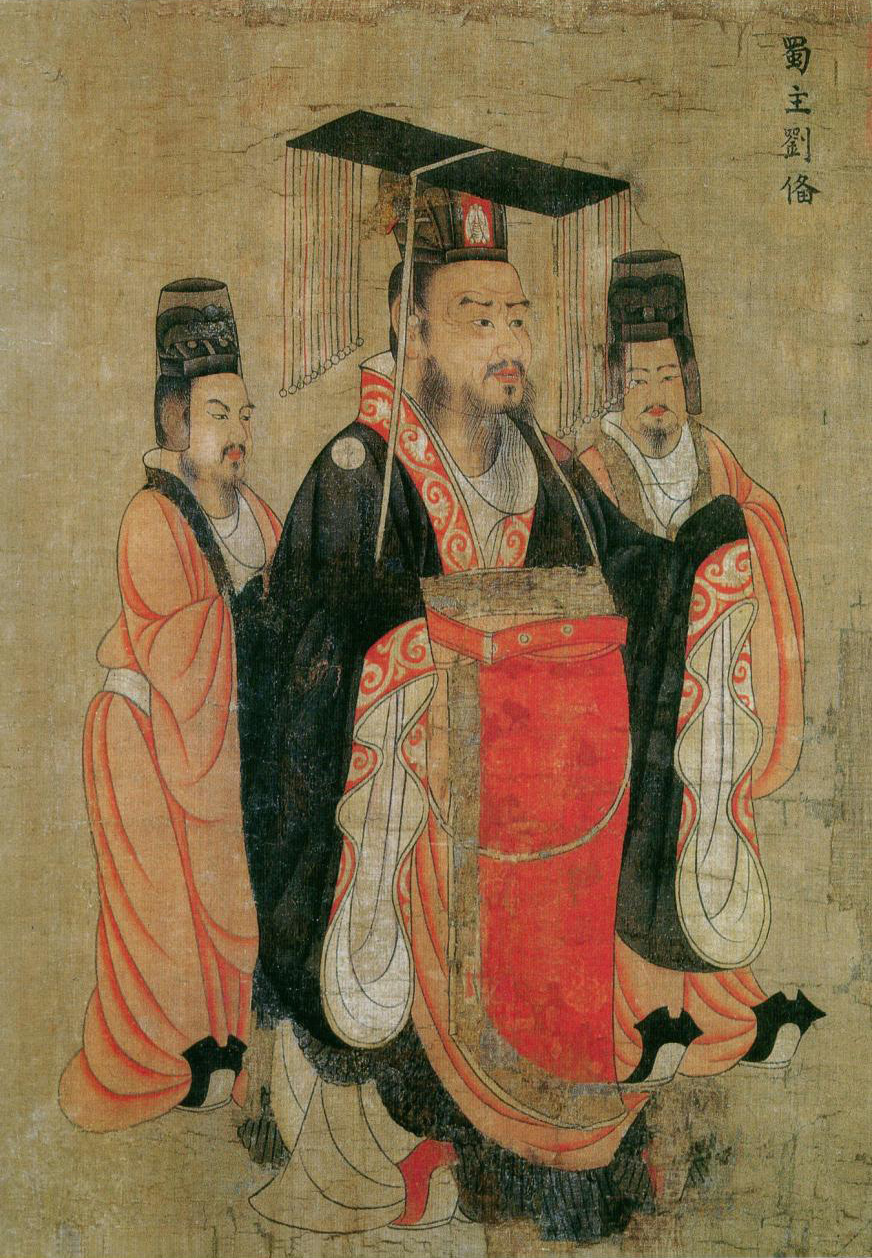
Portrait of Liu Bei in the Tang dynasty-era Thirteen Emperors Scroll

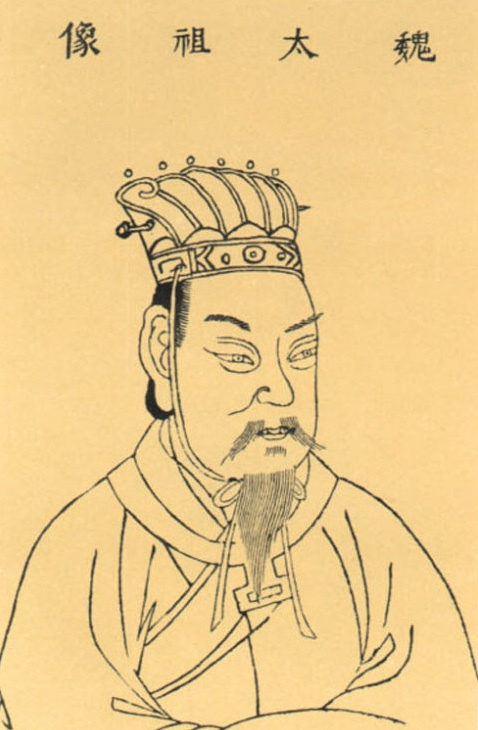
A Ming dynasty illustration of Cao Cao in the Sancai Tuhui

During the year 198, Lü Bu was threatened by Cao Cao's vassal Liu Bei, who was forced to surrender earlier and was now constantly building up his forces, moreover Liu Bei also managed to capture gold and money that Lü Bu wanted to use to buy military horses therefore he sent Gao Shun along with Zhang Liao to attack Liu Bei at Peicheng, Liu Bei's main base. Liu Bei's new ally, Cao Cao, then sent his trusted general Xiahou Dun to support him, but the allied forces were defeated by Gao Shun. In the end, Liu Bei had to leave Peicheng to take shelter under Cao Cao. In the winter of 198, Cao and Liu came back with a sizable army and attacked Lü's base. On 7 February 199, Lü's generals, Hou Cheng (侯成), Song Xian (宋憲) and Wei Xu, arrested Gao and Lü's key advisor, Chen Gong before surrendering to Cao with their troops. Lü surrendered soon after. Gao Shun, Lü Bu, Chen Gong and others were executed, and their heads were sent to Xuchang.

== In Romance of the Three Kingdoms ==
In the 14th-century historical novel Romance of the Three Kingdoms, Gao Shun was said to have duelled Xiahou Dun during an encounter outside Xiaopei in Chapter 18. After forty to fifty bouts, Gao was outmatched and had to retreat. Xiahou Dun urged his mount forward and chased Gao Shun deep into the enemy ranks. Then Cao Xing, a subject of Gao, secretly took aim and fired an arrow at Xiahou Dun. The arrow hit Xiahou Dun in the left eye. With a cry, Xiahou Dun pulled out the arrow along with his eyeball, which he swallowed, filling soldiers on both sides with fear. His spear firmly held up, Xiahou Dun then came straight for Cao Xing. With no time to react, Cao Xing was impaled through the face and died beneath his nemesis' horse. Gao Shun then turned and rallied his troops forward to defeat Xiahou Dun.

In Chapter 19, Gao and Zhang Liao were captured after they were trapped by the flood in Xiapi. When Lü Bu was brought before Cao Cao, Cao shifted his attention to Gao, and guards surrounding him hustled him in front of Cao Cao. "Anything to say?" Cao Cao asked him. Not wishing to join Cao Cao, Gao remained silent and accepted his fate. Cao Cao then had him executed along with Chen Gong.

== See also ==
- Lists of people of the Three Kingdoms
