= Lü Bu =

Chinese warlord and general (died 199)

- 呂布
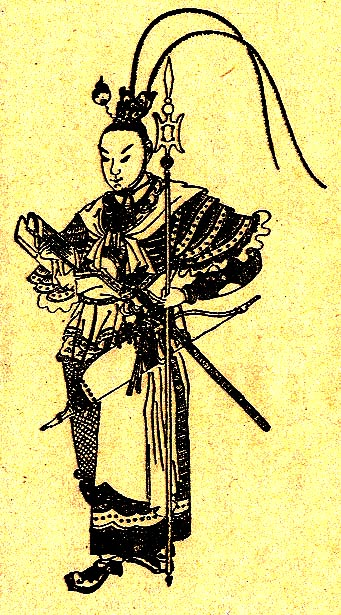
- A Qing dynasty illustration of Lü Bu

General of the Left (左將軍); General Who Pacifies the East (平東將軍)
- In office 197–199
- Monarch: Emperor Xian of Han

General of Vehement Might (奮威將軍)
- In office 192–197
- Monarch: Emperor Xian of Han

Personal details
- Born: before 161 (Note: A Ying'xiong Ji annotation in Lü Bu's biography in Sanguozhi indicate that he once addressed Liu Bei as a younger brother (名备为弟). Thus, his birth year should be before Liu Bei's 161.) Jiuyuan County, Wuyuan Commandery (now Jiuyuan District, Baotou City, Inner Mongolia, China)
- Died: 7 February 199 (Note: The Australian sinologist Rafe de Crespigny wrote in A Biographical Dictionary of Later Han to the Three Kingdoms 23–220 AD that Lü Bu died in the year 198. This is incorrect even though the 3rd year of the Jian'an era of the reign of Emperor Xian of Han largely corresponds to the year 198 in the Julian calendar; the 12th month of the 3rd year of Jian'an was from 15 January to 13 February 199 in the Julian calendar. The Zizhi Tongjian recorded that Lü Bu surrendered to Cao Cao on the guiyou (24th) day of that month, and was executed on the same day. This date corresponds to 7 February 199 in the Julian calendar. Emperor Xian's biography in the Book of the Later Han also gave the same date.) Xiapi County, Xiapi Commandery
- Occupation: Military general, politician, warlord

Chinese name
- Traditional Chinese: 呂布
- Simplified Chinese: 吕布
Transcriptions
Standard Mandarin
- Hanyu Pinyin: Lǚ Bù
- Wade–Giles: Lü^{3} Pu^{4}
- IPA: [lỳ pû]
Yue: Cantonese
- Yale Romanization: Léuih Bou
- Jyutping: Leoi5 Bou3
- IPA: [lɵɥ˩˧ pɔw˧]
Southern Min
- Hokkien POJ: Lī Pòo, Lū Pòo

Courtesy name
- Chinese: 奉先
Transcriptions
Standard Mandarin
- Hanyu Pinyin: Fèngxiān

Nickname
- Chinese: 飛將
- Literal meaning: Flying General
Transcriptions
Standard Mandarin
- Hanyu Pinyin: Fēi Jiāng

Marquis of Wen
- Chinese: 溫侯
Transcriptions
Standard Mandarin
- Hanyu Pinyin: Wēn Hóu

Lü Bu (died 7 February 199), courtesy name Fengxian, was a Chinese military general, politician and warlord who lived during the late Eastern Han dynasty. Originally a subordinate of Ding Yuan, he killed Ding Yuan and defected to Dong Zhuo. In 192, he killed Dong Zhuo after being instigated by Wang Yun and Shisun Rui (士孙瑞), but was defeated and driven away from Chang'an by Dong Zhuo's followers.

From 192 to early 195, Lü Bu consecutively sought shelter under warlords such as Yuan Shu, Yuan Shao, and Zhang Yang. In 194, he managed to take control of Yan Province from Cao Cao, but Cao took back his territories within two years. In 195, Lü Bu turned against Liu Bei, who had offered him refuge in Xu Province, and seized control of the province from his host. Although he had agreed to an alliance with Yuan Shu earlier, following Yuan declaring himself emperor in a treason against Emperor Xian of Han, Lü Bu joined Cao Cao and others in attacking the pretender. In 198, he sided with Yuan Shu again and came under attack by the combined forces of Cao and Liu, resulting in his defeat at the Battle of Xiapi in 199. He was captured and executed on Cao Cao's order.

Although Lü Bu is depicted in both historical and literary sources as an exceptionally formidable warrior, he was also notorious for his volatile temperament and political unreliability, traits that contributed to his downfall. His life is dramatized in the 14th-century novel Romance of the Three Kingdoms, which introduces fictional elements such as his romance with Diaochan.

== Historical sources on Lü Bu's life ==
There are two official biographies of Lü Bu. The first one is in the Records of the Three Kingdoms (Sanguozhi), which was written by Chen Shou in the third century.

In the fifth century, Pei Songzhi annotated the Sanguozhi by incorporating information from other sources to Chen Shou's original work and adding his personal commentary. Some alternative texts used in the annotations to Lü Bu's biography include: Yingxiong Ji (Chronicles of Heroes and Champions), by Wang Can; Xiandi Chunqiu (Chronicles of Emperor Xian), by Yuan Wei; Wei Shi Chunqiu (Chronicles of the Ruling Family of Wei), by Sun Sheng; Cao Man Zhuan (Biography of Cao Man), by an unknown writer.

The second biography of Lü Bu is in the Book of the Later Han (Houhanshu), which was compiled by Fan Ye in the fifth century.

== Physical appearance ==
No descriptions of Lü Bu's physical appearance exist in historical records. It was noted that he specialized in archery and horse-riding, and possessed great physical strength. He was nicknamed "Flying General" (飛將軍) for his martial prowess. (Note: (布便弓馬，膂力過人，號為飛將。) Sanguozhi vol. 7.) He also owned a powerful steed known as the "Red Hare". (Note: (北詣袁紹，紹與布擊張燕於常山。燕精兵萬餘，騎數千。布有良馬曰赤兎。) Sanguozhi vol. 7.) (Note: (布常御良馬，號曰赤菟，能馳城飛塹， ...) Houhanshu vol. 75.) The Cao Man Zhuan recorded that there was a saying at the time to describe Lü Bu and the Red Hare: "Among men, Lü Bu; Among steeds, Red Hare)". (Note: (曹瞞傳曰：「時人語曰：『人中有呂布，馬中有赤菟。』」) Cao Man Zhuan annotation in Sanguozhi vol. 7.)

Lü Bu is described as follows in the 14th-century historical novel Romance of the Three Kingdoms:

[...] a lofty and dignified look, a majestic and awe-inspiring bearing, wielding a Fangtian Huaji, (Note: Fangtian huaji (方天畫戟; 方天画戟; fāngtiān huàjǐ) was the name given to Lü Bu's weapon, a ji, in the novel. It was translated as "Sky Piercer".) [...] hair pulled back and worn in a golden headdress, donning a flowery-patterned battle robe, encased in body armour decorated with images of the ni, (Note: The ni (猊; ní) is a lion-like creature in Chinese mythology.) wearing a precious belt adorned with the image of a lion, [...]

== Biography ==
=== Service under Ding Yuan and defection to Dong Zhuo ===
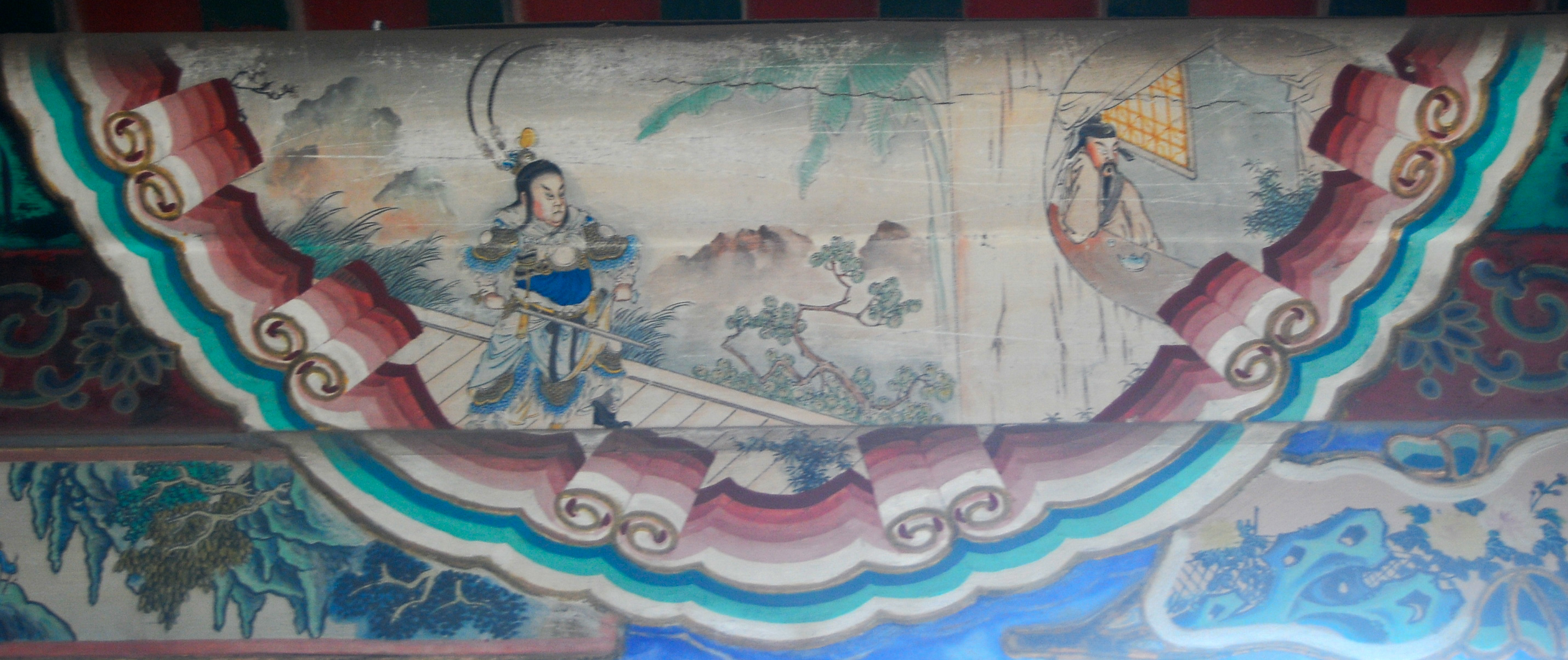
An illustration of Lü Bu killing Ding Yuan (呂布弒丁原) in the Long Corridor of the Summer Palace, Beijing.

Lü Bu was from Jiuyuan County (九原縣), Wuyuan Commandery along the northern Han frontiers, which is near present-day Baotou, Inner Mongolia. He was known for his martial valour in Bing Province. In early 188, his home province fell into disorder after the local Xiuchuge and Southern Xiongnu vassal tribes rebelled and murdered the Chinese regional Inspector (刺史). (Note: (五年春正月，休屠各胡寇西河，殺郡守邢紀... 三月，休屠各胡攻殺并州刺史張懿，遂與南匈奴左部胡合，殺其單于。) Houhanshu, vol. 8.) The official, Ding Yuan was appointed the new Inspector of Bing to quell the uprising by the Han central government. He was later promoted to Cavalry Commandant (騎都尉) and ordered to garrison at Henei Commandery. It was around this time when Ding Yuan met and recruited Lü Bu as a Registrar (主簿), treating him with exceptional kindness. (Note: (呂布字奉先，五原郡九原人也。 ... 以驍武給并州。刺史丁原為騎都尉，屯河內，以布為主簿，大見親待。) Sanguozhi vol. 7.)

After the death of Emperor Ling in May 189, Ding Yuan led his troops to the capital Luoyang to assist the general He Jin in eliminating the eunuch faction. He Jin ended up being assassinated by the eunuchs instead, after which the warlord Dong Zhuo led his forces into Luoyang and occupied the capital. Dong Zhuo wanted to kill Ding Yuan and take control of Ding's troops, so he induced Lü Bu into betraying Ding and defecting to his side. Lü Bu killed Ding Yuan, cut off his head, and presented it to Dong Zhuo, who had by then seized control of the Han central government. Dong Zhuo appointed Lü Bu as a Cavalry Commandant and placed much faith and trust in him. He also accepted Lü Bu as a foster son. Lü Bu was later promoted from the position of a Cavalry Commandant to a General of the Household (中郎將). He was also made a Marquis of a Chief Village (都亭侯). (Note: (靈帝崩，原將兵詣洛陽。與何進謀誅諸黃門，拜執金吾。進敗，董卓入京都，將為亂，欲殺原，并其兵衆。卓以布見信於原，誘布令殺原。布斬原首詣卓，卓以布為騎都尉，甚愛信之，誓為父子。 ... 稍遷至中郎將，封都亭侯。) Sanguozhi vol. 7.)

=== Service under Dong Zhuo ===
In 190, a coalition of warlords led by Yuan Shao initiated a punitive campaign against Dong Zhuo in response to Dong's tyranny and monopoly of the central government. Dong Zhuo had deposed Emperor Ling's successor, Emperor Shao, earlier that year and replaced him with Emperor Xian, who was actually a puppet ruler under his control. Lü Bu defended Dong Zhuo and fought in battles against the coalition. In one battle at Yangren (陽人; believed to be near present-day Wenquan, Ruzhou, Henan), Dong Zhuo ordered Lü Bu and Hu Zhen to attack Sun Jian (one of the coalition members), but Lü Bu and Hu Zhen could not get along with each other, resulting in disorder in their army. Sun Jian used the opportunity to attack them and forced them to retreat. (Note: (明年，孫堅收合散卒，進屯梁縣之陽人。卓遣將胡軫、呂布攻之，布與軫不相能，軍中自驚恐，士卒散亂。堅追擊之，軫、布敗走。) Houhanshu vol. 72.) Within months, the coalition forces had reached the capital Luoyang. Dong Zhuo personally led an army to engage the coalition vanguard, led by Sun Jian, in the area where the tombs of the Han emperors were located, but was defeated and forced to retreat. Sun Jian then passed through Luoyang's Xuanyang Gate (宣陽城門), where he attacked Lü Bu and drove him back. (Note: (卓自出與堅戰於諸陵墓閒，卓敗走，灠屯黽池，聚兵於陝。堅進洛陽宣陽城門，更擊呂布，布復破走。) Houhanshu vol. 72.) Dong Zhuo was alarmed, so he decided to evacuate Luoyang and move the capital to Chang'an in the west. He sent his troops to pillage Luoyang and force its residents to move to Chang'an as well, and then had Luoyang destroyed by fire. The coalition did not pursue Dong Zhuo to Chang'an and eventually dissolved by itself in the following year.

As Dong Zhuo usually behaved rudely in front of other people, he was afraid of being assassinated, hence he often kept Lü Bu by his side as a bodyguard. Dong Zhuo also had a bad temper and was easily agitated. During his outbursts, he threw short jis at Lü Bu, but Lü Bu reacted fast and dodged the weapons. Dong Zhuo's anger subsided after that. Lü Bu was very unhappy and he bore a grudge against his foster father. At the same time, Lü Bu was tasked with guarding Dong Zhuo's central living quarters, and he had a secret affair with one of Dong's maids. He feared that Dong Zhuo would find out and felt very uneasy about it. (Note: (卓自以遇人無禮，恐人謀己，行止常以布自衞。然卓性剛而褊，忿不思難，嘗小失意，拔手戟擲布。布拳捷避之，為卓顧謝，卓意亦解。由是陰怨卓。卓常使布守中閤，布與卓侍婢私通，恐事發覺，心不自安。) Sanguozhi vol. 7.)

Earlier on, Lü Bu had been warmly received by Wang Yun, the Minister over the Masses, so he went to see Wang and complained about how Dong Zhuo almost killed him. At the time, Wang Yun and another official, Shisun Rui (士孫瑞), were plotting to get rid of Dong Zhuo so they told Lü Bu about their plan and sought his help. Lü Bu said, "But we are father and son!" Wang Yun replied, "Your family name is Lü so you have no blood relations with him. He was not concerned about you at all when you almost died, so where was the father-son bond?" Lü Bu agreed to join them and personally killed Dong Zhuo later. After Dong Zhuo's death, Wang Yun and Lü Bu took charge of the central government. Lü Bu was appointed General of Vehement Might (奮威將軍) and received the honours equivalent to those received by the Three Ducal Ministers – three high-ranking officials in the Han administration. Emperor Xian also enfeoffed him as the Marquis of Wen (溫侯). (Note: (先是，司徒王允以布州里壯健，厚接納之。後布詣允，陳卓幾見殺狀。時允與僕射士孫瑞密謀誅卓，是以告布使為內應。布曰：「柰如父子何！」允曰：「君自姓呂，本非骨肉。今憂死不暇，何謂父子？」布遂許之，手刃刺卓。語在卓傳。 ... 允以布為奮威將軍，假節，儀比三司，進封溫侯，共秉朝政。) Sanguozhi vol. 7.)

Although Lü Bu have a high position with Wang Yun, but he contempted by Wang Yun as a swordsman, he suggested to kill Dong Zhuo’s remnants and reward officers with Dong Zhuo’s treasures, but Wang Yun refused all of them. In addition, Lü Bu always flaunted his credit, and caused the falling-out of the relationship with Wang Yun. (Note: (允初議赦卓部曲，呂布亦數勸之。既而疑曰：「此輩無罪，從其主耳。今若名為惡逆而特赦之，適足使其自疑，非所以安之之道也。」呂布又欲以卓財物班賜公卿、將校，允又不從。而素輕布，以劍客遇之。布亦負其功勞，多自誇伐，既失意望，漸不相平。) Houhanshu vol. 66.)

=== Expulsion from Chang'an ===
After Dong Zhuo's death, his followers from Liang Province, led by Li Jue, Guo Si and others, formed an army to attack Chang'an when Wang Yun refused to grant them amnesty for their past activities under Dong Zhuo. (Note: (允旣不赦涼州人，由是卓將李傕等遂相結，還攻長安。) Houhanshu vol. 75.) Guo Si led his men to attack the city's north gate, where he met Lü Bu, who told him, "Let's not send our soldiers into battle. Instead, let's have a man-on-man fight." Lü Bu then engaged Guo Si in a duel and injured him. Guo Si's men saved their superior. Both sides withdrew their forces. (Note: (英雄記曰：郭汜在城北。布開城門，將兵就汜，言「且却兵，但身決勝負」。汜、布乃獨共對戰，布以矛刺中汜，汜後騎遂前救汜，汜、布遂各兩罷。) Yingxiong Ji annotation in Sanguozhi vol. 7.) Lü Bu was unable to resist the enemy so he eventually abandoned Chang'an and fled. His defeat and subsequent flight took place 60 days after Dong Zhuo's death. (Note: (布自殺卓後，畏惡涼州人，涼州人皆怨。由是李傕等遂相結還攻長安城。 ... 布不能拒，傕等遂入長安。卓死後六旬，布亦敗。) Sanguozhi vol. 7.)

Pei Songzhi commented that the "60 days" claim in the original text of the Sanguozhi was erroneous. According to other sources, Lü Bu killed Dong Zhuo on the 23rd day of the fourth month in the third year of the Chuping era (190–193) in Emperor Xian's reign, and he fled from Chang'an on the first day of the sixth month. There were no interpolated dates in between, so Lü Bu could not have spent 60 days in Chang'an after Dong Zhuo's death. (Note: (臣松之案英雄記曰：諸書，布以四月二十三日殺卓，六月一日敗走，時又無閏，不及六旬。) Pei Songzhi's annotation in Sanguozhi vol. 7.)

=== Seeking shelter under Yuan Shu ===
After leaving Chang'an, Lü Bu, accompanied by a few hundred horsemen and with Dong Zhuo's head tied to his saddle, passed through Wu Pass and went to join Yuan Shu in Nanyang Commandery. The Sanguozhi and the Houhanshu give differing accounts of how Yuan Shu treated Lü Bu. The former claimed that Lü Bu expected to be received warmly because he felt that he had helped Yuan Shu take revenge by slaying Dong Zhuo. However, Yuan Shu detested Lü Bu because of his duplicity so he refused to accept him. (Note: (將數百騎出武關，欲詣袁術。布自以殺卓為術報讎，欲以德之。術惡其反覆，拒而不受。) Sanguozhi vol. 7.) The latter stated that Yuan Shu treated Lü Bu generously, but Lü behaved arrogantly as he felt that he deserved better treatment because he had done Yuan a favour by killing Dong Zhuo. Lü Bu also allowed his men to plunder the area. Yuan Shu became worried that Lü Bu would pose a threat to him, and Lü also felt uneasy after he heard that Yuan was suspicious of him, so he left. (Note: (布與傕戰，敗，乃將數百騎，以卓頭繫馬鞌，走出武關，奔南陽。袁術待之甚厚。布自恃殺卓，有德袁氏，遂恣兵鈔掠。術患之。布不安，復去從張楊於河內。) Houhanshu vol. 75.)

=== Joining Yuan Shao and Zhang Yang ===
After leaving Yuan Shu, Lü Bu then headed to northern China to join Yuan Shu's relative, Yuan Shao. He assisted Yuan Shao in attacking Zhang Yan at Changshan. Zhang Yan had thousands of elite soldiers and cavalry. Lü Bu led his subordinates Cheng Lian (成廉) and Wei Yue (魏越) and dozens of riders to raid Zhang Yan's camp, killing several enemies and then fighting their way out. They did this three to four times every day continuously for a period of over ten days and eventually defeated Zhang Yan's forces. (Note: (常與其親近成廉、魏越等陷鋒突陣，遂破燕軍。) Sanguozhi vol. 7.) (Note: (... 與其健將成廉、魏越等數十騎馳突燕陣，一日或至三四，皆斬首而出。連戰十餘日，遂破燕軍。) Houhanshu vol. 75.)

Lü Bu behaved arrogantly in front of Yuan Shao because he perceived that he had done the Yuans a favour by slaying Dong Zhuo. He belittled Yuan's followers and treated them with contempt. He once asked for more soldiers from Yuan Shao but was refused, after which he sent his men to plunder Yuan's territories. Yuan Shao was greatly displeased and felt that Lü Bu posed a threat to him. Lü Bu sensed that Yuan Shao was suspicious of him so he wanted to leave northern China and return to Luoyang. Yuan Shao pretended to agree and recommended Lü Bu to take up the appointment of Colonel-Director of Retainers (司隷校尉) while secretly plotting to kill him. (Note: (布旣恃其功，更請兵於紹，紹不許，而將士多暴橫，紹患之。) Houhanshu vol. 75.) (Note: (而求益兵衆，將士鈔掠，紹患忌之。布覺其意，從紹求去。) Sanguozhi vol. 7.)

On the day of Lü Bu's departure, Yuan Shao sent 30 armoured soldiers to escort him and personally saw him off. Along the journey, Lü Bu stopped and rested inside his tent. That night, Yuan Shao's soldiers crept into the tent and killed the person inside, who had covered himself with a blanket, after which they reported that Lü Bu was dead. The following day, Yuan Shao received news that Lü Bu was still alive so he immediately had the gates in his city closed. In fact, Lü Bu had secretly left his tent the previous night without Yuan Shao's soldiers knowing, and had ordered one of his men to remain inside as a decoy. (Note: (紹恐還為己害，遣壯士夜掩殺布，不獲。) Sanguozhi vol. 7.) (Note: (英雄記曰：布自以有功於袁氏，輕傲紹下諸將，以為擅相署置，不足貴也。布求還洛，紹假布領司隷校尉。外言當遣，內欲殺布。明日當發，紹遣甲士三十人，辭以送布。布使止於帳側，偽使人於帳中鼓箏。紹兵卧，布無何出帳去，而兵不覺。夜半兵起，亂斫布牀被，謂為已死。明日，紹訊問，知布尚在，乃閉城門。布遂引去。) Yingxiong Ji annotation in Sanguozhi vol. 7.)

Lü Bu fled to Henei Commandery to join Zhang Yang after his escape. Yuan Shao sent his men to pursue Lü Bu but they were afraid of Lü and did not dare to approach him. (Note: (事露，布走河內，與張楊合。紹令衆追之，皆畏布，莫敢逼近者。) Sanguozhi vol. 7.) Zhang Yang and his subordinates were bribed by Li Jue and Guo Si to kill Lü Bu. When Lü Bu heard about it, he told Zhang Yang, "I'm from the same province as you. If you kill me, you'll become weaker. If you offer me, you can obtain honours and titles from Li Jue and Guo Si." Zhang Yang pretended to agree to help Li Jue and Guo Si kill Lü Bu but he secretly offered refuge to Lü instead. When Li Jue and Guo Si learnt that Zhang Yang had accepted Lü Bu, they became worried so they sent an imperial decree to Henei in Emperor Xian's name, appointing Lü Bu as the Administrator (太守) of Yingchuan Commandery. (Note: (英雄記曰：楊及部曲諸將皆受傕、汜購募，共圖布。布聞之，謂楊曰：「布，卿州里也。卿殺布，於卿弱。不如賣布，可極得汜、傕爵寵。」楊於是外許汜、傕，內實保護布。汜、傕患之，更下大封詔書，以布為頴川太守。) Yingxiong Ji annotation in Sanguozhi vol. 7.)

The account of Lü Bu's association with Zhang Yang in the Sanguozhi differed slightly from that recorded in the Houhanshu. The former mentioned that Lü Bu joined Yuan Shao after he was rejected by Yuan Shu, and then he sought shelter under Zhang Yang after Yuan Shao sent assassins to kill him. In the Houhanshu, however, it was stated that Lü Bu went to join Zhang Yang after leaving Yuan Shu, and he managed to persuade Zhang to ignore Li Jue and Guo Si's urgings to kill him and instead provide him refuge. He left Zhang Yang later and went to join Yuan Shao, but returned to Zhang again after surviving the assassination attempt. On his way to Henei, Lü Bu passed by Chenliu (陳留; around present-day Kaifeng, Henan), where its Administrator, Zhang Miao, received him warmly. Zhang Miao made a pledge of friendship with Lü Bu when he saw him off from Chenliu. (Note: (時李傕等購募求布急，楊下諸將皆欲圖之。布懼，謂楊曰：「與卿州里，今見殺，其功未必多。不如生賣布，可大得傕等爵寵。」楊以為然。 ... 紹聞，懼為患，募遣追之，皆莫敢逼，遂歸張楊。道經陳留，太守張邈遣使迎之，相待甚厚，臨別把臂言誓。) Houhanshu vol. 75.)

=== Battle of Yan Province ===
Yuan Shao was furious when he heard that Zhang Miao – whom he had a feud with – had become Lü Bu's friend. Around the time, Yuan Shao was still an ally of Cao Cao, so Zhang Miao feared that Cao would combine forces with Yuan to attack him. Besides, Zhang Miao's jurisdiction, Chenliu, was in Yan Province, which was under Cao Cao's control. (Note: (呂布之捨袁紹從張楊也，過邈臨別，把手共誓。紹聞之，大恨。邈畏太祖終為紹擊己也，心不自安。) Sanguozhi vol. 7.)

In 194, when Cao Cao left Yan Province to attack Xu Province, Zhang Miao's younger brother Zhang Chao (張超), along with Cao's subordinates Chen Gong, Xu Si (許汜) and Wang Kai (王楷), started a rebellion. Chen Gong persuaded Zhang Miao to join them in welcoming Lü Bu into Yan Province. With help from the defectors, Lü Bu seized control of Puyang and declared himself the Governor (牧) of Yan Province. The various commanderies and counties in Yan Province responded to Lü Bu's call and defected to his side, except for Juancheng, Dong'e and Fan counties, which still remained under Cao Cao's control. (Note: (興平元年，太祖復征謙，邈弟超，與太祖將陳宮、從事中郎許汜、王楷共謀叛太祖。宮說邈曰：「今雄傑並起，天下分崩，君以千里之衆，當四戰之地，撫劒顧眄，亦足以為人豪，而反制於人，不以鄙乎！今州軍東征，其處空虛，呂布壯士，善戰無前，若權迎之，共牧兖州，觀天下形勢，俟時事之變通，此亦縱橫之一時也。」邈從之。太祖初使宮將兵留屯東郡，遂以其衆東迎布為兖州牧，據濮陽。郡縣皆應，唯鄄城、東阿、范為太祖守。) Sanguozhi vol. 7.)

Upon receiving news of the rebellion and Lü Bu's intrusion, Cao Cao aborted the Xu Province campaign and led his forces back to Yan Province. The armies of Lü Bu and Cao Cao clashed at Puyang, where Cao was unable to overcome Lü, so both sides were locked in a stalemate for over 100 days. At the time, Yan Province was plagued by locusts and droughts so the people suffered from famine and many had resorted to cannibalism to survive. Lü Bu moved his base from Puyang further east to Shanyang. Within two years, Cao Cao managed to retake all his territories in Yan Province and he later defeated Lü Bu in a battle at Juye County. Lü Bu fled east to Xu Province and took shelter under Liu Bei. (Note: (太祖引軍還，與布戰於濮陽，太祖軍不利，相持百餘日。是時歲旱、蟲蝗、少穀，百姓相食，布東屯山陽。二年間，太祖乃盡復收諸城，擊破布於鉅野。布東奔劉備。) Sanguozhi vol. 7.)

=== Warlord of Xu Province ===
==== Seizing Xu Province from Liu Bei ====
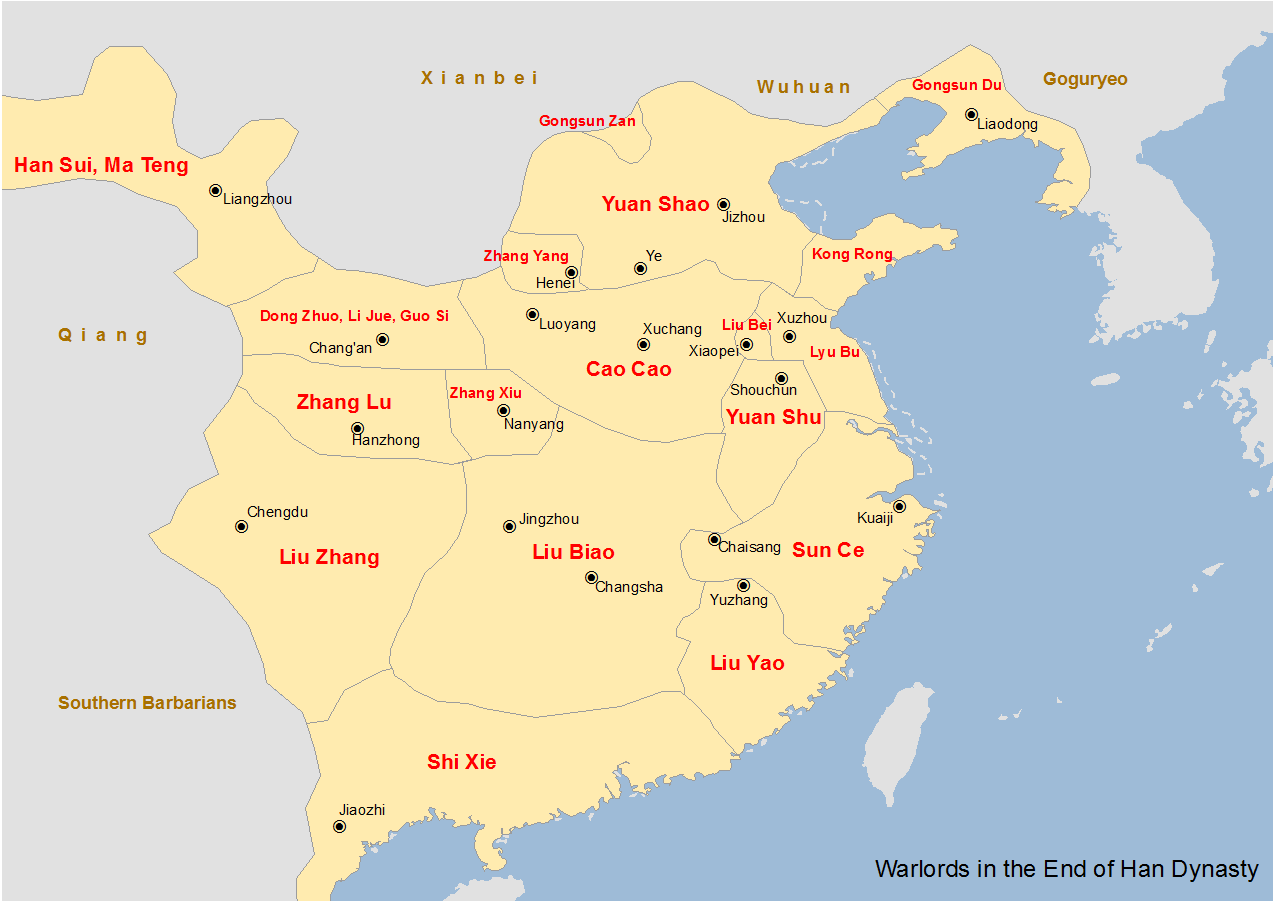
Map showing the major warlords of the Han dynasty in the 190s, including the territories controlled by Lü Bu after he seized control of Xu Province from Liu Bei

Lü Bu treated Liu Bei very respectfully when he first met him, and he said, "You and I are both from the northern borders. When I saw the Guandong Coalition rising up against Dong Zhuo, I already wanted to help them eliminate him. However, after I slew Dong Zhuo and left Chang'an, none of the former coalition members were willing to accept me. They even tried to kill me." He then brought Liu Bei to his camp, asked Liu to sit on his wife's bed, and instructed his wife to pay respect to Liu. He then threw a feast for Liu Bei and called Liu his "younger brother". Liu Bei knew that Lü Bu was unpredictable and untrustworthy, but he kept quiet and pretended to be friendly towards Lü Bu. (Note: (英雄記曰：布見備，甚敬之，謂備曰：「我與卿同邊地人也。布見關東起兵，欲誅董卓。布殺卓東出，關東諸將無安布者，皆欲殺布耳。」請備於帳中坐婦牀上，令婦向拜，酌酒飲食，名備為弟。備見布語言無常，外然之而內不說。) Yingxiong Ji annotation in Sanguozhi vol. 7.)

When Liu Bei was governing Xu Province, he was stationed in the provincial capital Xiapi and he drew boundaries with Yuan Shu in the areas around the Huai River. When Yuan Shu learnt that Lü Bu was in Xu Province, he wanted to instigate Lü Bu to help him deal with Liu Bei, so he wrote to Lü Bu: "In the past, Dong Zhuo monopolised state power, harmed the imperial family, and murdered my family. I participated in the campaign against Dong Zhuo but did not manage to kill him. You slew Dong Zhuo and sent me his head. In doing so, you helped me take revenge and salvage my reputation. This was the first favour you did me. When Jin Yuanxiu (金元休) was heading to Yan Province to assume office, Cao Cao defeated and nearly drove him to the point of destruction. Later, you attacked Cao Cao in Yan Province and helped me regain my reputation. This was the second favour you did me. Throughout my life, I have never heard of the existence of Liu Bei, but he started a war with me. With your mighty spirit, you are capable of defeating Liu Bei, and this will be the third favour you do me. With these three favours you did me, I am willing to entrust matters of life and death to you even though I may not be worthy. You have been fighting battles for a long time and you lack food supplies. I hereby send you 200,000 hu (斛) of grain and open my doors to you. If they are insufficient, I will continue to provide you a steady flow of supplies. If you need weapons and military equipment, just ask." Lü Bu was delighted and he agreed to help Yuan Shu attack Xiapi. (Note: (英雄記曰：布初入徐州，書與袁術。術報書曰：「昔董卓作亂，破壞王室，禍害術門戶，術舉兵關東，未能屠裂卓。將軍誅卓，送其頭首，為術掃滅讐耻，使術明目於當世，死生不愧，其功一也。昔將金元休向兖州，甫詣封部，為曹操逆所拒破，流離迸走，幾至滅亡。將軍破兖州，術復明目於遐邇，其功二也。術生年已來，不聞天下有劉備，備乃舉兵與術對戰；術憑將軍威靈，得以破備，其功三也。將軍有三大功在術，術雖不敏，奉以生死。將軍連年攻戰，軍糧苦少，今送米二十萬斛，迎逢道路，非直此止，當駱驛復致；若兵器戰具，佗所乏少，大小唯命。」布得書大喜，遂造下邳。) Yingxiong Ji annotation in Sanguozhi vol. 7.) The contents of Yuan Shu's letter, as recorded in the Houhanshu, were slightly different and briefer as compared to that recorded in the Sanguozhi. (Note: (時劉備領徐州，居下邳，與袁術相拒於淮上。術欲引布擊備，乃與布書曰：「術舉兵詣闕，未能屠裂董卓。將軍誅卓，為術報恥，功一也。昔金元休南至封丘，為曹操所敗。將軍伐之，令術復明目於遐邇，功二也。術生年以來，不聞天下有劉備，備乃舉兵與術對戰。憑將軍威靈，得以破備，功三也。將軍有三大功在術，術雖不敏，奉以死生。將軍連年攻戰，軍糧苦少，今送米二十萬斛。非唯此止，當駱驛復致。凡所短長亦唯命。」) Houhanshu vol. 75.)

Lü Bu led his forces to some 40 li west of Xiapi. Xu Dan (許耽), who was from Danyang (丹楊) and was serving as a General of the Household (中郎將) under Liu Bei, sent Zhang Kuang (章誑) to meet Lü Bu at night. Zhang Kuang told Lü Bu, "Zhang Yide quarrelled with Cao Bao and killed him. The city is now in a state of chaos. There are 1,000 soldiers from Danyang stationed at the west white gate. When they heard of your arrival, they jumped for joy as if they have been revitalised. The Danyang soldiers will open the west gate for you when you reach there." Lü Bu mobilised his troops that night and reached Xiapi at dawn, where the Danyang soldiers opened the west gate for him. Lü Bu sat on the viewing platform above the gate and instructed his troops to set fire in the city. They defeated Zhang Fei and his men in battle and captured Liu Bei's family, the families of Liu's subordinates, and Liu's supplies. (Note: (英雄記曰：布水陸東下，軍到下邳西四十里。備中郎將丹楊許耽夜遣司馬章誑來詣布，言「張益德與下邳相曹豹共爭，益德殺豹，城中大亂，不相信。丹楊兵有千人屯西白城門內，聞將軍來東，大小踊躍，如復更生。將軍兵向城西門，丹楊軍便開門內將軍矣」。布遂夜進，晨到城下。天明，丹楊兵悉開門內布兵。布於門上坐，步騎放火，大破益德兵，獲備妻子軍資及部曲將吏士家口。) Yingxiong Ji annotation in Sanguozhi vol. 7.)

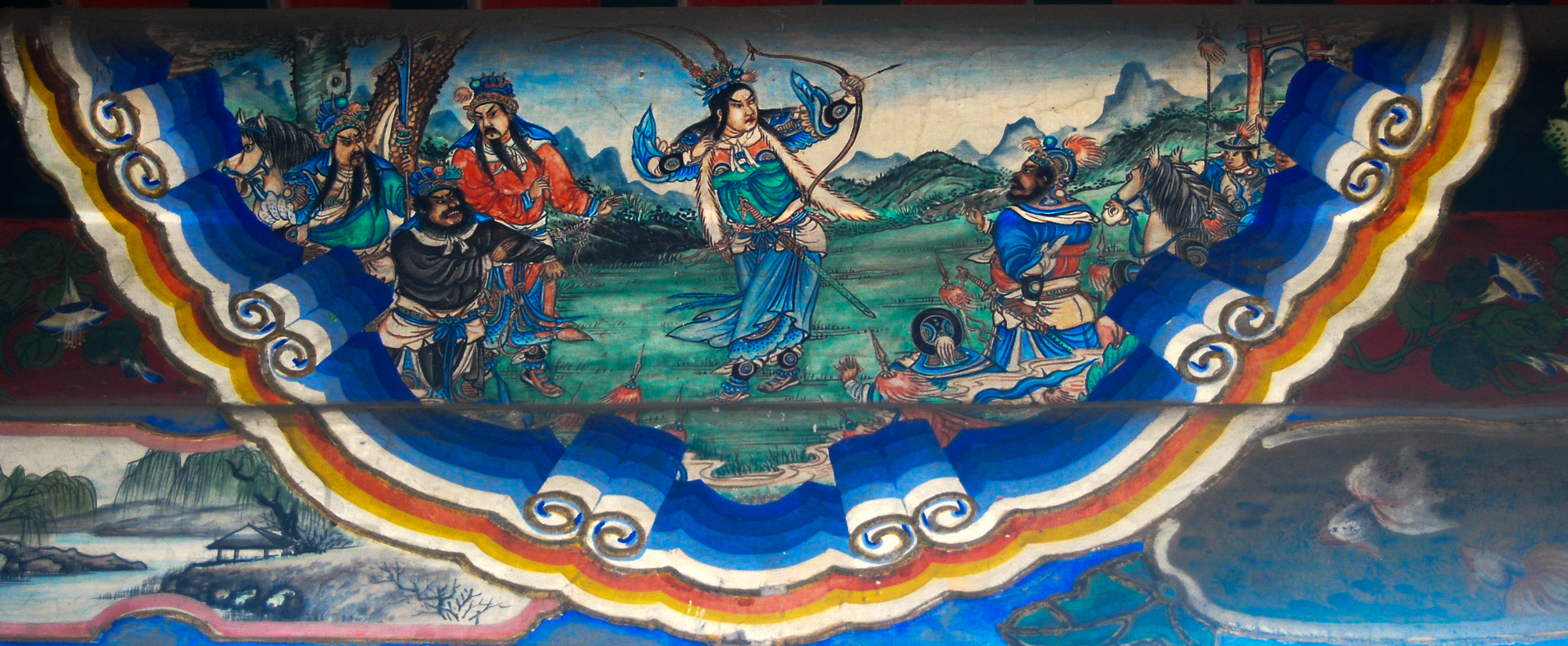
An illustration of Lü Bu shooting at a ji (轅門射戟) in the Long Corridor of the Summer Palace, Beijing.

Upon receiving news of Lü Bu's intrusion, Liu Bei immediately headed back to Xiapi Commandery but most of his troops scattered along the way. With his remaining men, Liu Bei moved eastward to take Guangling Commandery where Yuan Shu's forces defeated him. Liu Bei then retreated to Haixi County (海西縣; southeast of present-day Guannan County, Jiangsu). (Note: (布取下邳，張飛敗走。備聞之，引兵還，比至下邳，兵潰。收散卒東取廣陵，與袁術戰，又敗。) Yingxiong Ji annotation in Sanguozhi vol. 32.) Where, in hunger and desperation, he surrendered to Lü Bu. This took place in around early 196. (Note: (袁術來攻先主，先主拒之於盱眙、淮陰。曹公表先主為鎮東將軍，封宜城亭侯，是歲建安元年也。先主與術相持經月，呂布乘虛襲下邳。下邳守將曹豹反，間迎布。布虜先主妻子，先主轉軍海西。) Sanguozhi vol. 32.) Lü Bu was displeased that Yuan Shu's supplies had not reached him yet, so he led his men to welcome Liu Bei. He appointed Liu Bei as the Inspector (刺史) of Yu Province and ordered him to garrison at Xiaopei, while he declared himself the Governor of Xu Province (Note: The Houhanshu recorded that Lü Bu declared himself the Governor of Xu Province, but the Sanguozhi stated that Lü Bu proclaimed himself the Inspector of Xu Province. "Inspector" (刺史; cishi) ranked below "Governor" (牧; mu) in the Han dynasty.) (Note: (備東擊術，布襲取下邳，備還歸布。布遣備屯小沛。布自稱徐州刺史。) Sanguozhi vol. 7.) and remained in Xiapi. (Note: (布得書大恱，即勒兵襲下邳，獲備妻子。備敗走海西，飢困，請降於布。布又恚術運糧不復至，乃具車馬迎備，以為豫州刺史，遣屯小沛。布自號徐州牧。) Houhanshu vol. 75.)

==== Hao Meng's Rebellion ====
In July or August 196, Lü Bu's subordinate Hao Meng rebelled against him and attacked his office in Xiapi. Lü Bu's general Gao Shun suppressed the rebellion with help from Cao Xing – Hao Meng's subordinate, who refused to betray Lü Bu – and killed Hao Meng. (Note: See the articles on Hao Meng and Cao Xing for details.) Later that year, Lü Bu used his archery skill to prevent a battle between Liu Bei and Yuan Shu's general Ji Ling from taking place. He had a ji erected at the gate of the camp, and proposed, "Gentlemen, watch me fire an arrow at the lower part of the curved blade on the ji. If I hit it in one shot, all of you must withdraw your forces and leave. If I don't, you can remain here and prepare for battle." He then raised his bow and fired an arrow at the ji, hitting exactly the lower part of the curved blade. Everyone present at the scene was shocked. They said, "General, you possess Heaven's might!" The following day, they threw another party and then withdrew their forces.

=== Allying with Cao Cao against Yuan Shu ===
==== Cancellation of engagement ====
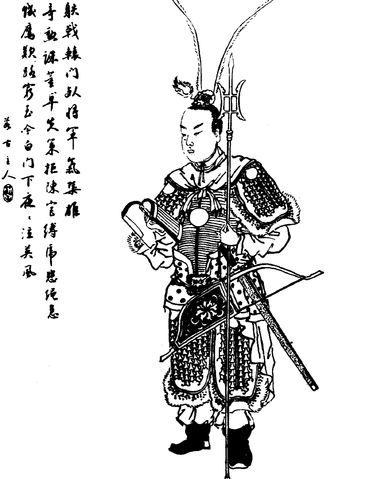
An illustration of Lū Bu.

In early 197, Yuan Shu declared himself "Son of Heaven" in Shouchun, the administrative centre of his territories, and founded a Zhong (仲) dynasty. However, his declaration garnered little to no support, and this was deemed an act of treason against the reigning Emperor Xian of the Han dynasty, so Yuan Shu soon found himself the target of attacks by Cao Cao (Note: Cao Cao had become the de facto head of the Han government after fetching Emperor Xian to Xu, which was under his control, in 196. The new capital and imperial court was established in Xu. With the emperor in his control, Cao Cao represented imperial authority.) and other warlords who had received orders from the Han imperial court to eliminate the pretender.

Earlier on, Yuan Shu wanted to form an alliance with Lü Bu so he proposed a marriage between his son and Lü Bu's daughter. Lü Bu initially agreed. After proclaiming himself emperor, Yuan Shu sent his subordinate Han Yin (韓胤) to meet Lü Bu and escort Lü Bu's daughter back to his territory for the marriage. However, Lü Bu changed his mind after Chen Gui convinced him to do so, and after he recalled how Yuan Shu rejected him when he first sought shelter under him. He then sent his men to chase Han Yin's convoy, which was on its way back to Shouchun, and retrieve his daughter. He also captured Han Yin and sent him as a prisoner to Xu, where Han Yin was executed. (Note: (術欲結布為援，乃為子索布女，布許之。術遣使韓胤以僭號議告布，并求迎婦。 ... 布亦怨術初不己受也，女已在塗，追還絕婚，械送韓胤，梟首許市。) Sanguozhi vol. 7.)

==== Peace with Cao Cao ====
The Yingxiong Ji recorded:

When Emperor Xian was in Hedong, he once sent a written order to Lü Bu, ordering the latter to lead his men to Hedong to escort him. As his army lacked supplies then, Lü Bu did not personally travel to Hedong, but he sent a messenger to pass a memorial to the emperor. The Han imperial court later appointed Lü Bu as General Who Pacifies the East (平東將軍) and granted him the title "Marquis of Pingtao" (平陶侯). However, the emissary who was tasked with bringing the official seal to Lü Bu lost the seal in Shanyang. Cao Cao personally wrote to Lü Bu to console him, and he also mentioned his desires to defend the emperor, pacify the empire, and help the emperor eliminate Gongsun Zan, Yuan Shu, Han Xian, Yang Feng and others. Lü Bu was overjoyed, and he wrote another memorial to Emperor Xian: "I should have come to defend Your Majesty, but I heard that Cao Cao is loyal and filial and he has escorted Your Majesty safely to the new capital Xu. Earlier on, I fought battles with Cao Cao, and now he has come to defend Your Majesty. I am a general outside the central government, so I feared that if I brought along my troops and followed Cao Cao to escort Your Majesty, others may doubt my intentions. As such, I chose to remain in Xu Province and wait for Your Majesty to punish me for disobeying your order. I did not dare to make my own decision on whether to act or not." Lü Bu also wrote a reply letter to Cao Cao: "I am guilty (of disobeying the Emperor's order) and I deserve to be punished. However, you comforted me and gave me encouragement. When I receive the Emperor's decrees for the elimination of Yuan Shu and the others, I will, with my life, help His Majesty execute his orders." Cao Cao then sent Wang Ze (王則), a Commandant of Equipage (奉車都尉), as an emissary to bring Emperor Xian's decree to Xu Province and bestow upon Lü Bu the official seal of the General Who Pacifies the East. Cao Cao also wrote a personal letter to Lü Bu: "The officials in Shanyang offered a replacement for your official seal, which was lost there. However, the imperial treasury lacks gold reserves (for making your seal), so I took from my personal stores. The imperial treasury also lacks purple silk, so I took from my stores again. You are not making wise moves. Yuan Shu (committed treason when he) proclaimed himself emperor, so you should break all your connections with him. The Imperial Court trusts you, which was why they were willing to send you your commission again. You should prove your loyalty to the Emperor." Lü Bu sent Chen Deng (Chen Gui's son) as a messenger to Xu to thank Emperor Xian and pass a fine silk cord to Cao Cao to express his gratitude. (Note: (英雄記曰：初，天子在河東，有手筆版書召布來迎。布軍無畜積，不能自致，遣使上書。朝廷以布為平東將軍，封平陶侯。使人於山陽界亡失文字，太祖又手書厚加慰勞布，說起迎天子，當平定天下意，并詔書購捕公孫瓚、袁術、韓暹、楊奉等。 ... 布大喜，復遣使上書於天子曰：「臣本當迎大駕，知曹操忠孝，奉迎都許。臣前與操交兵，今操保傅陛下，臣為外將，欲以兵自隨，恐有嫌疑，是以待罪徐州，進退未敢自寧。」答太祖曰：「布獲罪之人，分為誅首，手命慰勞，厚見褒獎。重見購捕袁術等詔書，布當以命為效。」 ... 太祖更遣奉車都尉王則為使者，齎詔書，又封平東將軍印綬來拜布。太祖又手書與布曰：「山陽屯送將軍所失大封，國家無好金，孤自取家好金更相為作印，國家無紫綬，自取所帶紫綬以籍心。將軍所使不良。袁術稱天子，將軍止之，而使不通章。朝廷信將軍，使復重上，以相明忠誠。」布乃遣登奉章謝恩，并以一好綬答太祖。) Yingxiong Ji annotation in Sanguozhi vol. 7.)

The main text of the Sanguozhi, however, mentioned that the Han imperial court appointed Lü Bu as General of the Left (左將軍) instead of General Who Pacifies the East (as stated in the Yingxiong Ji). Nevertheless, Lü Bu did allow Chen Deng to go to Xu as his representative to thank the imperial court. (Note: (珪欲使子登詣太祖，布不肯遣。會使者至，拜布左將軍。布大喜，即聽登往，并令奉章謝恩。) Sanguozhi vol. 7.) In Xu, Chen Deng urged Cao Cao to get rid of Lü Bu and agreed to serve as a mole in Xu Province to help Cao Cao eliminate Lü Bu. Chen Deng also received a promotion while his father Chen Gui got a salary increase. (Note: (奉使到許，太祖以登為廣陵太守，令陰合衆以圖呂布。) Xianxian Xingzhuang annotation in Sanguozhi vol. 7.) (Note: (即增珪秩中二千石，拜登廣陵太守。臨別，太祖執登手曰：「東方之事便以相付。」令登陰合部衆以為內應。) Sanguozhi vol. 7.)

When Chen Deng returned to Xu Province, an angry Lü Bu confronted him, brandished his ji at him and said, "Your father advised me to side with Cao Cao and reject Yuan Shu's offer. Now, (after following his advice,) I have gained nothing, while you and your father got promoted and rewarded. You must have tricked me! What do you have to say?" Chen Deng maintained his composure and calmly replied, "When I met Cao Cao, I told him, 'You should treat the General (Lü Bu) in the same way you raise a tiger. Feed it well with meat. If it is not well-fed, it will attack people.' Cao Cao replied, 'You're wrong. He's like a hawk. If it is hungry, it will hunt for you. If it is well-fed, it will fly away.' That was what we talked about." Lü Bu's anger subsided. (Note: (始，布因登求徐州牧，登還，布怒，拔戟斫机曰：「卿父勸吾恊同曹公，絕婚公路；今吾所求無一獲，而卿父子並顯重，為卿所賣耳！卿為吾言，其說云何？」登不為動容，徐喻之曰；「登見曹公言：『待將軍譬如養虎，當飽其肉，不飽則將噬人。』公曰：『不如卿言也。譬如養鷹，饑則為用，飽則揚去。』其言如此。」布意乃解。) Sanguozhi vol. 7.)

=== War against Yuan Shu ===
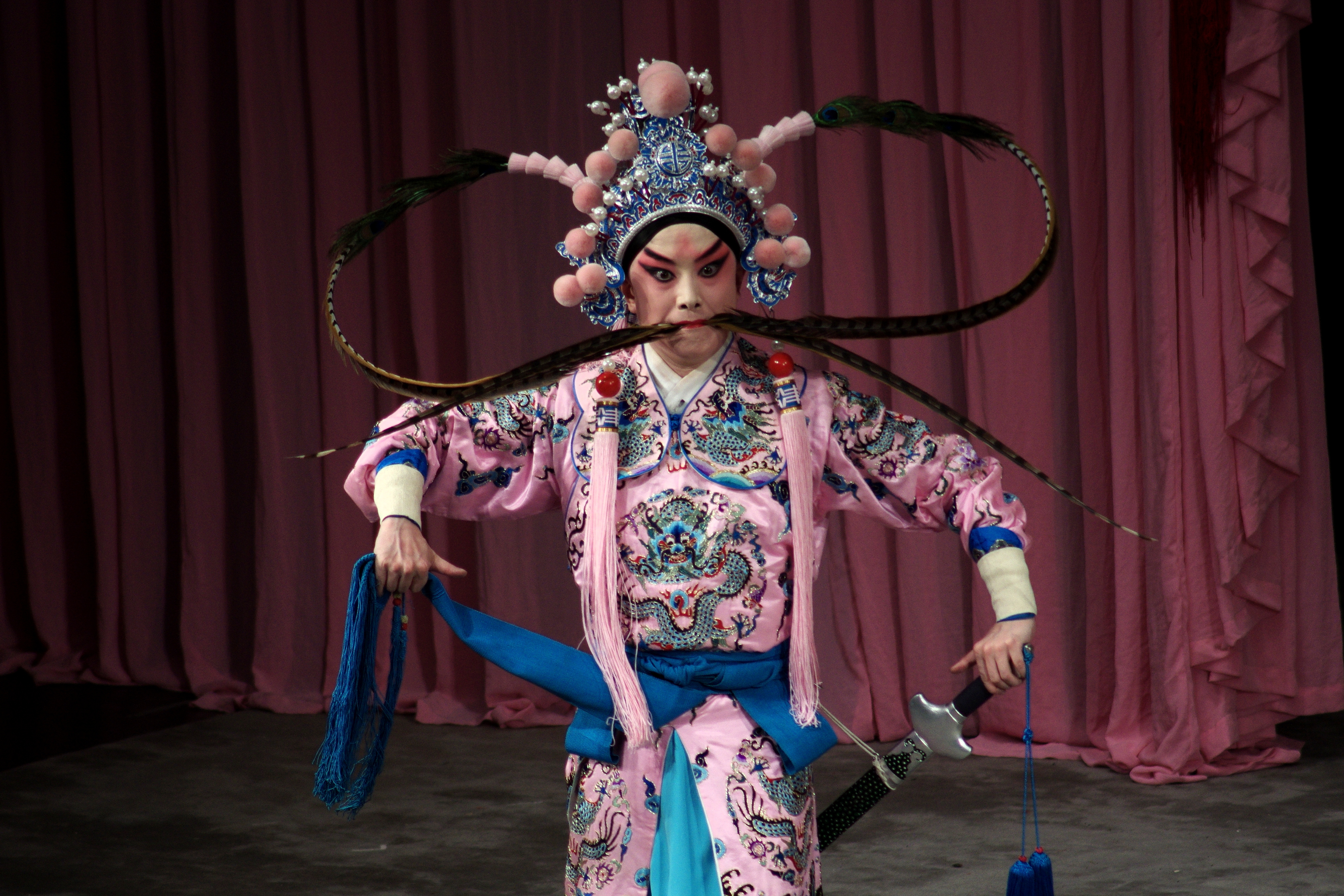
Lü Bu portrayed by a Peking opera actor in 2015.

Yuan Shu was furious that Lü Bu reneged on his word, so he allied with Han Xian and Yang Feng, and sent his general Zhang Xun (張勳) to attack Lü Bu. Lü Bu asked Chen Gui, "Yuan Shu sends his forces to attack me because I followed your suggestion. What should I do now?" Chen Gui replied, "The alliance between Han Xian, Yang Feng and Yuan Shu is formed by a loose assembly of their forces. They have not decided on a common plan so they will not last long. They are like chickens tied up together and they cannot move in tandem. My son, Deng, has a plan to separate them." (Note: (袁術怒布殺韓胤，遣其大將張勳、橋蕤等與韓暹、楊奉連埶，步騎數萬，七道攻布。布時兵有三千，馬四百匹，懼其不敵，謂陳珪曰：「今致術軍，卿之由也，為之奈何？」珪曰：「暹、奉與術，卒合之師耳。謀無素定，不能相維。子登策之，比於連雞，埶不俱棲，立可離也。」) Houhanshu vol. 75.)

Lü Bu heeded Chen Gui's advice and sent a letter to Han Xian and Yang Feng, "You two generals escorted the Emperor in Luoyang, while I personally killed Dong Zhuo. We have all accomplished deeds worthy of praise. Yuan Shu has committed treason, so everyone should attack him. Why do you side with the traitor instead and join him in attacking me? We should combine forces to defeat Yuan Shu, help the Emperor eliminate this traitor, and achieve glory. We should not lose this opportunity now." He also promised to share the spoils of war with them. Han Xian and Yang Feng were pleased and they agreed to help Lü Bu. They defeated Zhang Xun at Xiapi and captured Qiao Rui (橋蕤), one of Yuan Shu's officers. Yuan Shu's forces suffered heavy casualties and many of his soldiers fell into the river and drowned. (Note: (布用珪策，與暹、奉書曰：「二將軍親拔大駕，而布手殺董卓，俱立功名，當垂竹帛。今袁術造逆，冝共誅討，柰何與賊還來伐布？可因今者同力破術，為國除害，建功天下，此時不可失也。」又許破術兵，悉以軍資與之。暹、奉大喜，遂共擊勳等於下邳，大破之，生禽橋蕤，餘衆潰走，其所殺傷、墯水死者殆盡。) Houhanshu vol. 75.)

Lü Bu, Han Xian and Yang Feng later led their forces to attack Shouchun, the capital of Yuan Shu's territories, travelling on both land and water. They plundered the lands along their journey. By the time they reached Zhongli (鍾離; around present-day Chuzhou, Anhui), they had made much gains so they retreated. Before crossing the Huai River back to the north, Lü Bu left Yuan Shu a letter: "You rely on your strong army and often boast of your fierce generals and warriors, intending to devour each other. I have always restrained you! Although I am not brave, I stride like a tiger across Huainan. In a short time, you fled to Shouchun like a rat, with no one daring to rise. Where are all the fierce generals and warriors? You like to make grand pronouncements to deceive the world, but how can you deceive all the people of the world? In ancient times, when armies clashed, envoys were involved, and it was not I who first conceived the strategy. We are not far apart, and we can communicate again." After Lü Bu crossed the Huai River, Yuan Shu personally led 5,000 soldiers to the riverbank. Lü Bu's forces, which were on the opposite end, laughed at their enemy and retreated. (Note: (英雄記曰：布後又與暹、奉二軍向壽春，水陸並進，所過虜略。到鍾離，大獲而還。旣渡淮北，留書與術曰：「足下恃軍彊盛，常言猛將武士，欲相吞滅，每抑止之耳！布雖無勇，虎步淮南，一時之間，足下鼠竄壽春，無出頭者。猛將武士，為悉何在？足下喜為大言以誣天下，天下之人安可盡誣？古者兵交，使在其間，造策者非布先唱也。相去不遠，可復相聞。」布渡畢，術自將步騎五千揚兵淮上，布騎皆於水北大咍笑之而還。) Yingxiong Ji annotation in Sanguozhi vol. 7.)

=== Conflict with Zang Ba ===
Around the time, Xiao Jian (蕭建) served as the Chancellor (相) of Langya State and was stationed in Ju County. Xiao Jian, a conservative man, did not have any contact with Lü Bu. Lü Bu wrote to Xiao Jian: "Initially, everyone throughout the Empire took up arms for the purpose of eliminating Dong Zhuo. I killed Dong Zhuo and headed east, where I hoped to be able to borrow troops and return west to defend the Emperor and restore the capital Luoyang. However, the warlords were fighting among themselves and none of them were concerned about the state. I am from Wuyuan (五原), which is located more than 5,000 li away from Xu Province and is somewhere in the northwestern border. As of now, I came here not to fight for the southeastern lands. Ju and Xiapi are not far from each other so it is easy to maintain communication between them. You behave like you are an emperor in a commandery and a king in a county! In the past, when Yue Yi attacked the Qi state, he conquered over 70 cities in Qi, except for Ju and Jimo because of Tian Dan. I am not Yue Yi, and neither are you Tian Dan. You can seek the counsel of wise men on this letter." After receiving Lü Bu's letter, Xiao Jian ordered Ji Jian (齎牋) to present five fine steeds as gifts to Lü Bu. (Note: (時有東海蕭建為琅邪相，治莒，保城自守，不與布通。布與建書曰：「天下舉兵，本以誅董卓爾。布殺卓，來詣關東，欲求兵西迎大駕，光復洛京，諸將自還相攻，莫肯念國。布，五原人也，去徐州五千餘里，乃在天西北角，今不來共爭天東南之地。莒與下邳相去不遠，宜當共通。君如自遂以為郡郡作帝，縣縣自王也！昔樂毅攻齊，呼吸下齊七十餘城，唯莒、即墨二城不下，所以然者，中有田單故也。布雖非樂毅，君亦非田單，可取布書與智者詳共議之。」建得書，即遣主簿齎牋上禮，貢良馬五匹。) Yingxiong Ji annotation in Sanguozhi vol. 7.)

Zang Ba defeated Xiao Jian later and seized possession of his resources. When Lü Bu heard that, he wanted to lead his forces to attack Zang Ba in Ju County, but Gao Shun advised him against it, "General, you've earned yourself widespread fame for killing Dong Zhuo. Even if you remain in your current position, those near and far will still be afraid of you. You shouldn't be so reckless as to personally lead your men into battle. If you lose, the damage to your reputation won't be minimal." Lü Bu ignored him. Zang Ba heard of Lü Bu's violent and plundering ways, so he remained inside Ju County and put up a firm defence against Lü Bu. Lü Bu was unable to conquer Ju County so he withdrew his forces and returned to Xiapi. After that, the generals of Taishan bandits include Zang Ba, Sun Guan, Wu Dun, Yin Li and Chang Xi all submitted to Lü Bu, the power of Lü Bu was significantly stronger. (Note: (建尋為臧霸所襲破，得建資實。布聞之，自將步騎向莒。高順諫曰：「將軍躬殺董卓，威震夷狄，端坐顧盼，遠近自然畏服，不宜輕自出軍；如或不捷，損名非小。」布不從。霸畏布鈔暴，果登城拒守。布不能拔，引還下邳。霸後復與布和。) Yingxiong Ji annotation in Sanguozhi vol. 7.) (Note: (時太山臧霸等攻破莒城，許布財幣以相結，而未及送，布乃自往求之。其督將高順諫止曰：「將軍威名宣播，遠近所畏，何求不得，而自行求賂。萬一不剋，豈不損邪？」布不從。旣至莒，霸等不測往意，固守拒之，無獲而還。順為人清白有威嚴，少言辭，將衆整齊，每戰必剋。布性決易，所為無常。順每諫曰：「將軍舉動，不肯詳思，忽有失得，動輒言誤。誤事豈可數乎？」布知其忠而不能從。) Houhanshu vol. 75.)

=== Battle of Xiapi ===
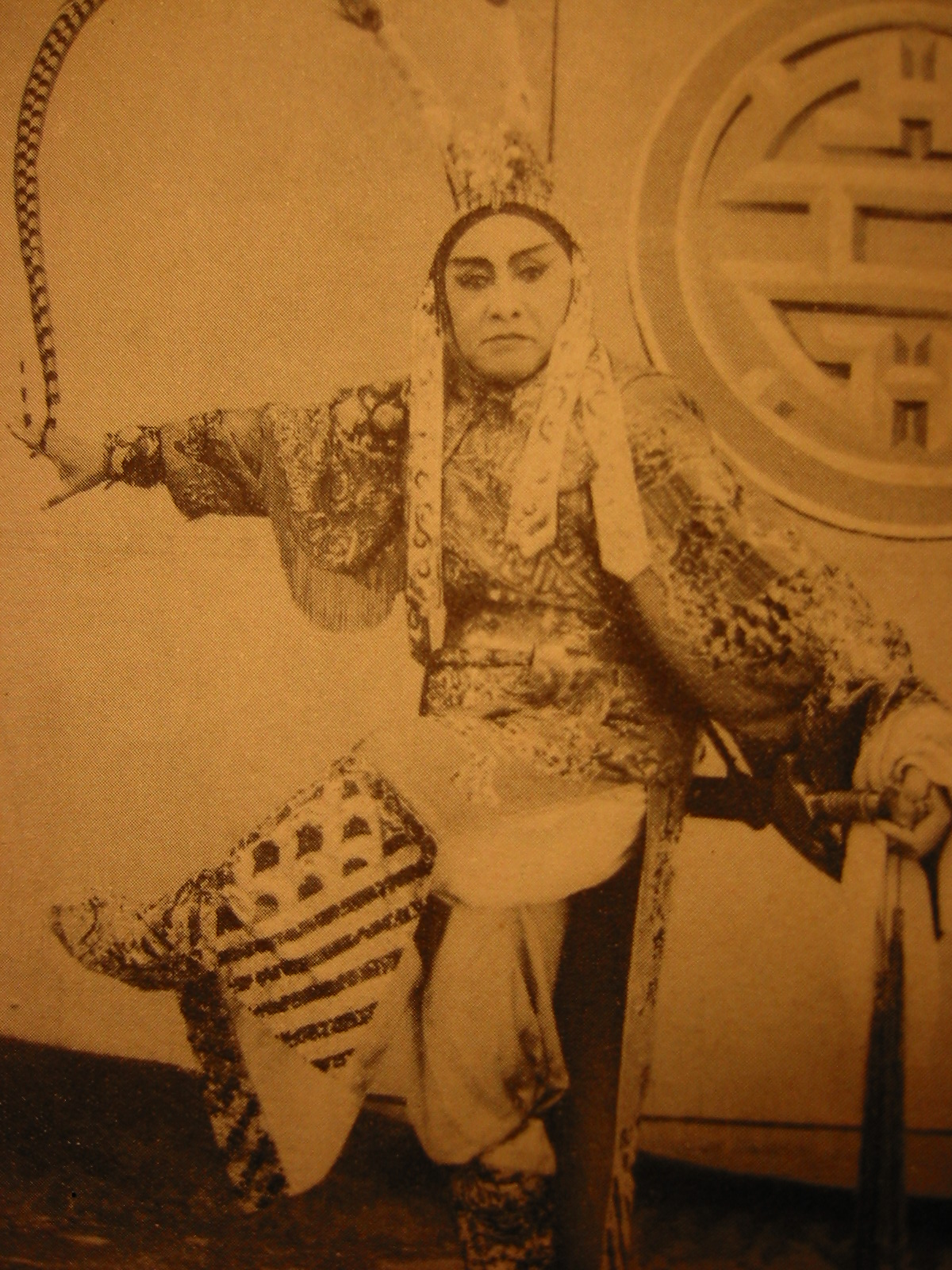
Lü Bu portrayed by a Vietnamese tuồng actor in 1961.

==== Conflict in Xiaopei ====
During the year 197, Yang Feng and Han Xian were brigands who raided the area between Yang and Xu provinces and were ordered by Lü Bu to lead their troops to raid Liu Bei's supplies. However, Liu Bei successfully lured them into a trap. Yang Feng was killed while Han Xian managed to escape. (Note: (《後漢書·卷七十二·董卓列傳第六十二》：奉、暹奔袁術，遂縱暴楊、徐間。明年，左將軍劉備誘奉斬之。) Houhanshu vol. 72.)

Around late 197 or early 198, Lü Bu sided with Yuan Shu. Lu Bu also ordered his soldiers to gather gold and money to buy some military horses however along the way Liu Bei led his troops and managed to capture the gold and money. In response, Lu Bu sent Gao Shun and Zhang Liao to attack Liu Bei at Peicheng. Cao Cao sent Xiahou Dun to support Liu Bei but Gao Shun defeated Liu Bei, as well as the reinforcements Cao Cao had sent to assist him. (Note: (呂布惡之，自出兵攻先主，先主敗走歸曹公。曹公厚遇之，以為豫州牧。將至沛收散卒，給其軍糧，益與兵使東擊布。布遣高順攻之，曹公遣夏侯惇往，不能救，為順所敗，復虜先主妻子送布。曹公自出東征，) Sanguozhi vol. 32.) (Note: (英雄記曰：建安三年春，布使人齎金欲詣河內買馬，為備兵所鈔。布由是遣中郎將高順、北地太守張遼等攻備。九月，遂破沛城，備單身走，獲其妻息。十月，曹公自征布，備於梁國界中與曹公相遇，遂隨公俱東征。) Yingxiong Ji annotation in Sanguozhi vol. 32.)

==== Cao Cao's army attack Xu Province ====
In the winter of 198, Cao Cao personally led a campaign against Lü Bu and besieged Xiapi. He wrote a letter to Lü Bu, explaining the benefits of submitting and the consequences of putting up resistance. Lü Bu wanted to surrender, but Chen Gong and the others knew that they had already offended Cao Cao (when they betrayed him earlier), so they urged Lü Bu to change his decision. (Note: (建安三年，布復叛為術，遣高順攻劉備於沛，破之。太祖遣夏侯惇救備，為順所敗。太祖自征布，至其城下，遺布書，為陳禍福。布欲降，陳宮等自以負罪深，沮其計。) Sanguozhi vol. 7.)

When Cao Cao's army reached Pengcheng, Chen Gong told Lü Bu, "We should attack the enemy now, since our troops have rested well while the enemy is weary. We're sure to win." Lü Bu replied, "Why don't we wait for them to attack first? After that we'll destroy them in the Si River." When Cao Cao's attacks increased in intensity, Lü Bu went up the White Gate Tower (白門樓; the viewing platform above the main gate in the south of Xiapi (Note: (宋武北征記曰：「下邳城有三重，大城周四里，呂布所守也。魏武禽布於白門。白門，大城之門也。」) Song Wu Beizheng Ji annotation in Houhanshu vol. 75.) (Note: (酈元水經注曰：「南門謂之白門，魏武禽陳宮於此。」) Shui Jing Zhu annotation in Houhanshu vol. 75.)) and told his men, "Cao Cao has no intention of finding trouble with you. I should surrender to the wise lord." Chen Gong said, "The treacherous Cao Cao is no wise lord! Surrendering to him is like hitting a rock with an egg! How can you expect to live (after you surrender)?" (Note: (獻帝春秋曰：太祖軍至彭城。陳宮謂布：「宜逆擊之，以逸擊勞，無不克也。」布曰：「不如待其來攻，蹙著泗水中。」及太祖軍攻之急，布於白門樓上謂軍士曰：「卿曹無相困，我當自首明公。」陳宮曰：「逆賊曹操，何等明公！今日降之，若卵投石，豈可得全也！」) Xiandi Chunqiu annotation in Sanguozhi vol. 7.)

Lü Bu sent Xu Si (許汜) and Wang Kai (王楷) to request urgent aid from Yuan Shu. Yuan Shu said, "Lü Bu refused to send his daughter here, so it's expected that he'll meet his doom. Why does he seek help from me again?" Xu Si and Wang Kai replied, "If Your Highness doesn't save Lü Bu, you'll be courting your own doom. If Lü Bu is destroyed, Your Highness will be next." Yuan Shu then prepared his troops and claimed that he would be sending reinforcements to Lü Bu. (Note: (英雄記曰：布遣許汜、王楷告急於術。術曰：「布不與我女，理自當敗，何為復來相聞邪？」汜、楷曰：「明上今不救布，為自敗耳！布破，明上亦破也。」術時僭號，故呼為明上。術乃嚴兵為布作聲援。) Yingxiong Ji annotation in Sanguozhi vol. 7.) In the meantime, Lü Bu thought that Yuan Shu was reluctant to help him because he did not send his daughter to Yuan Shu, so, one night, he tied his daughter to himself and attempted to break out of the siege. However, they encountered Cao Cao's soldiers, who fired arrows at them, so they had no choice but to return to Xiapi. (Note: (布恐術為女不至，故不遣兵救也，以緜纏女身，縛著馬上，夜自送女出與術，與太祖守兵相觸，格射不得過，復還城。) Yingxiong Ji annotation in Sanguozhi vol. 7.) Lü Bu led some 1,000 riders out of the city to engage the enemy, but lost the battle so he retreated back to Xiapi and did not dare to venture out. (Note: This engagement between Lü Bu and Cao Cao's forces was mentioned in the main text of the Sanguozhi. It was possible that Lü Bu's attempt to bring his daughter out of Xiapi, as mentioned in the Yingxiong Ji, took place concurrently with this skirmish. Otherwise, Lü Bu would have engaged Cao Cao's forces twice after requesting Yuan Shu's help.) (Note: (布遣人求救於術，自將千餘騎出戰，敗走，還保城，不敢出。) Sanguozhi vol. 7.)

Lü Bu ordered Chen Gong and Gao Shun to defend Xiapi, while he personally led some horsemen to attack Cao Cao's supply routes. However, before he left, his wife told him, "General, I know you want to attack Cao Cao's supply lines, but Chen Gong and Gao Shun can't get along with each other. If you leave, they may not work well together in defending the city. If a mishap occurs, what will become of you, General? I hope you'll consider this carefully and not be misled by Chen Gong and the others. When I was in Chang'an, you already abandoned me, but I managed to return to you because Pang Shu (龐舒) secretly protected me and kept me with him. You don't need to worry about me now." Lü Bu felt gloomy after listening to his wife and could not decide on what to do. (Note: (布欲令陳宮、高順守城，自將騎斷太祖糧道。布妻謂曰：「將軍自出斷曹公糧道是也。宮、順素不和，將軍一出，宮、順必不同心共城守也，如有蹉跌，將軍當於何自立乎？願將軍諦計之，無為宮等所誤也。妾昔在長安，已為將軍所棄，賴得龐舒私藏妾身耳，今不須顧妾也。」布得妻言，愁悶不能自決。) Yingxiong Ji annotation in Sanguozhi vol. 7.)

Chen Gong told Lü Bu, "Cao Cao has come a long way and he won't be able to last long. General, you can bring some troops with you and set up a camp outside the city, while the others and I will remain behind to defend the city. If the enemy attacks you, I'll lead the city's soldiers to attack them from behind. If they attack the city, you can reinforce the city from outside. Within ten days, the enemy's supplies will be depleted and we can defeat them easily." Lü Bu agreed with Chen Gong's idea. However, Lü Bu's wife said, "In the past, the Caos treated Gongtai (Chen Gong) like a newborn child, but he still turned against them and joined you. Now, the way you treat Gongtai is no lesser than how Cao Cao treated him, and you intend to entrust the entire city to him, along with your family, while you venture out alone? If something happens, I won't be your wife anymore!" Lü Bu then changed his mind. (Note: (魏氏春秋曰：陳宮謂布曰：「曹公遠來，勢不能乆。若將軍以步騎出屯，為勢於外，宮將餘衆閉守於內，若向將軍，宮引兵而攻其背，若來攻城，將軍為救於外。不過旬日，軍食必盡，擊之可破。」布然之。布妻曰：「昔曹氏待公臺如赤子，猶舍而來。今將軍厚公臺不過於曹公，而欲委全城，捐妻子，孤軍遠出，若一旦有變，妾豈得為將軍妻哉！」布乃止。) Wei Shi Chunqiu annotation in Sanguozhi vol. 7.)

==== The betrayal of Hou Cheng ====
Yuan Shu was unable to come to Lü Bu's aid. (Note: (術亦不能救。) Sanguozhi vol. 7.) Cao Cao could not conquer Xiapi despite pressing attacks on the city and his men were growing weary. He wanted to abort the campaign and return to Xuchang, but his advisors Guo Jia and Xun You urged him to press on. He then ordered his troops to direct the waters of the Yi (沂) and Si (泗) rivers to flood Xiapi. After a siege lasting three months, the morale of Lü Bu's forces fell drastically and his men gradually alienated him. (Note: (曹操壍圍之，壅沂、泗以灌其城，三月，上下離心。) Houhanshu vol. 75.) (Note: (建安三年， ... 是歲，太祖自宛征呂布，至下邳，布敗退固守，攻之不拔，連戰，士卒疲，太祖欲還。攸與郭嘉說曰：「呂布勇而無謀，今三戰皆北，其銳氣衰矣。三軍以將為主，主衰則軍無奮意。夫陳宮有智而遲，今及布氣之未復，宮謀之未定，進急攻之，布可拔也。」乃引沂、泗灌城，城潰，生禽布。) Sanguozhi vol. 10.) On 7 February 199, Lü Bu's subordinates Hou Cheng, Song Xian (宋憲) and Wei Xu (魏續) captured Chen Gong and Gao Shun, and then led their troops to surrender to Cao Cao. (Note: See Hou Cheng#In historical records for the reason for Hou's defection.) (Note: (其將侯成使客牧其名馬，而客策之以叛。成追客得馬，諸將合禮以賀成。成分酒肉，先入詣布而言曰：「蒙將軍威靈，得所亡馬，諸將齊賀，未敢甞也，故先以奉貢。」布怒曰：「布禁酒而卿等醞釀，為欲因酒共謀布邪？」成忿懼，乃與諸將共執陳宮、高順，率其衆降。) Houhanshu vol. 75.)

Lü Bu and his remaining subordinates went up the White Gate Tower and surrendered when they saw they had been surrounded. (Note: (布與其麾下登白門樓。兵圍急，乃下降。) Sanguozhi vol. 7.) The Houhanshu recorded that Lü Bu asked his men to kill him and bring his head to Cao Cao but they refused. Lü Bu surrendered to Cao Cao immediately after. (Note: (兵圍之急，令左右取其首詣操。左右不忍，乃下降。) Houhanshu vol. 75.)

=== Downfall and death ===
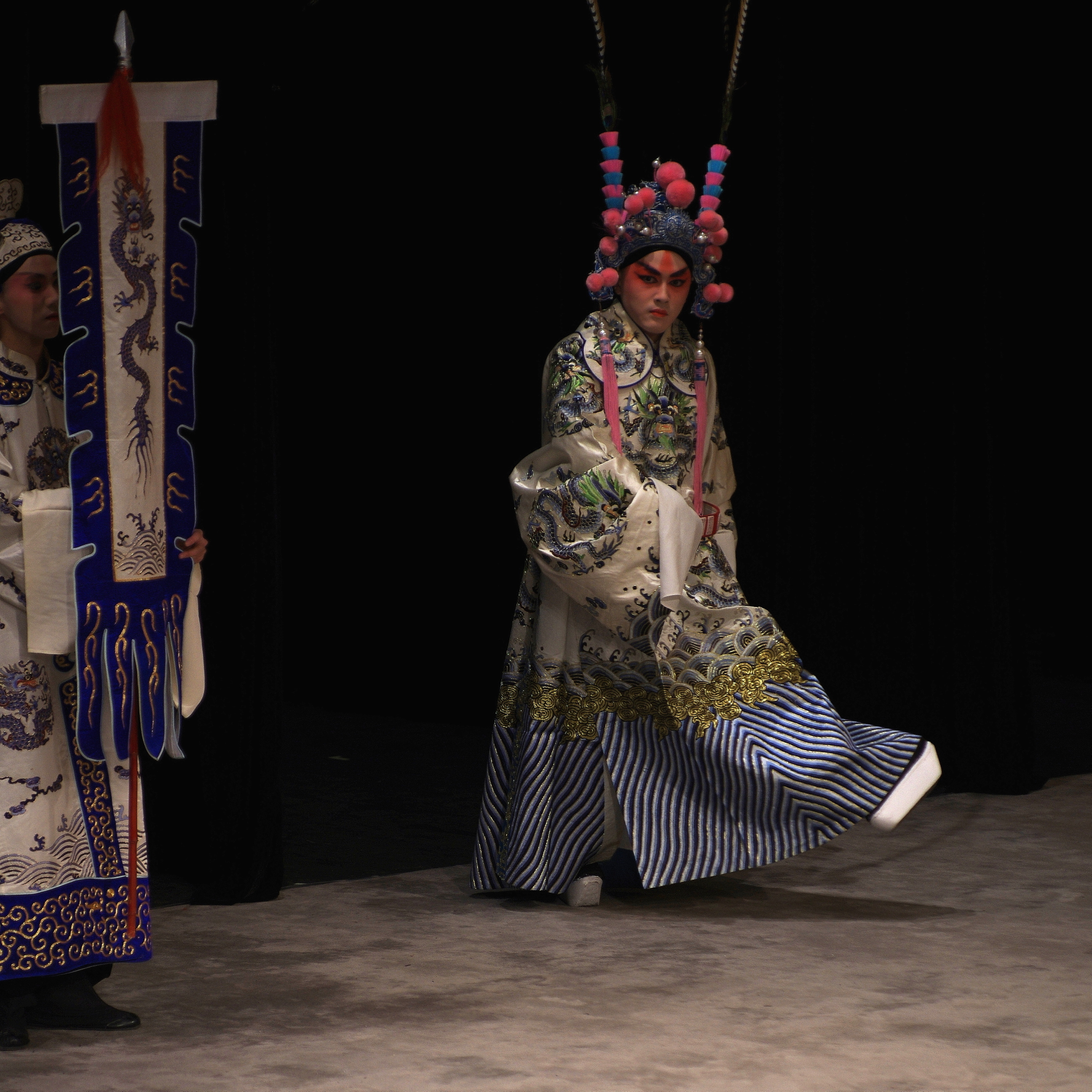
Lü Bu portrayed by a Kunqu actor in 2015.

Lü Bu was tied up and brought before Cao Cao. He said, "I'm being tied up too tightly. Can you loosen the bonds?" Cao Cao replied, "A tiger must be tightly restrained." Lü Bu then said, "My lord, you dread only me, but now, since I've already submitted to you, you shouldn't have any more worries. My lord, why don't you spare me and let me help you lead your troops? In this way, you won't need to worry about not being able to pacify the Empire." When Cao Cao showed signs of reconsideration, Liu Bei interjected, "My lord, haven't you seen what Lü Bu did to Ding Jianyang and Grand Preceptor Dong?" Cao Cao rubbed his chin. Lü Bu shouted at Liu Bei, "You're the most untrustworthy person!" (Note: (遂生縛布，布曰：「縛太急，小緩之。」太祖曰：「縛虎不得不急也。」布請曰：「明公所患不過於布，今已服矣，天下不足憂。明公將步，令布將騎，則天下不足定也。」太祖有疑色。劉備進曰：「明公不見布之事丁建陽及董太師乎！」太祖頷之。布因指備曰：「是兒最叵信者。」) Sanguozhi vol. 7.)

Additional details about the conversation between Lü Bu and Cao Cao were recorded in other texts and they were later added by Pei Songzhi as annotations to the Sanguozhi.

The Yingxiong Ji recorded:

Lü Bu told Cao Cao, "I treated my subordinates generously, but they betrayed me when I was in trouble." Cao Cao replied, "You abandoned your wife, and you've designs on your men's wives. You call this 'treating them generously'?" Lü Bu remained silent. (Note: (英雄記曰：布謂太祖曰：「布待諸將厚也，諸將臨急皆叛布耳。」太祖曰：「卿背妻，愛諸將婦，何以為厚？」布默然。) Yingxiong Ji annotation in Sanguozhi vol. 7.)

The Xiandi Chunqiu recorded:

Lü Bu asked Cao Cao, "My lord, you've lost weight. Why?" Cao Cao asked him, "How do you recognise me?" Lü Bu replied, "When I was in Luoyang, I saw you at the Wen Family Gardens (溫氏園)." Cao Cao said, "Yes, I forgot. I lost weight because I'm depressed over not having recruited you earlier." Lü Bu said, "In the past, Duke Huan of Qi forgave Guan Zhong for injuring him earlier and even appointed Guan as his chancellor. Now, is it possible for you to allow me to do my best to serve you?" As Lü Bu had been tightly restrained, he turned to Liu Bei and said, "Xuande, you're a guest here. I'm a prisoner being tied up. Why don't you say anything to help me?" Cao Cao laughed and said, "Why do you turn to him instead of speaking directly to me?" Cao Cao had the intention of sparing Lü Bu so he ordered his men to loosen Lü's bonds. However, Wang Bi (王必), a Registrar (主簿) under Cao Cao, interrupted, "Lü Bu is a powerful foe and his allies are nearby. He shouldn't be spared." Cao Cao then said to Lü Bu, "I wanted to spare your life, but my Registrar says no. So, what should I do?" (Note: (獻帝春秋曰：布問太祖：「明公何瘦？」太祖曰：「君何以識孤？」布曰：「昔在洛，會溫氏園。」太祖曰：「然。孤忘之矣。所以瘦，恨不早相得故也。」布曰：「齊桓舍射鉤，使管仲相；今使布竭股肱之力，為公前驅，可乎？」布縛急，謂劉備曰：「玄德，卿為坐客，我為執虜，不能一言以相寬乎？」太祖笑曰：「何不相語，而訴明使君乎？」意欲活之，命使寬縛。主簿王必趨進曰：「布，勍虜也。其衆近在外，不可寬也。」太祖曰：「本欲相緩，主簿復不聽，如之何？」) Xiandi Chunqiu annotation in Sanguozhi vol. 7.)

Cao Cao had Lü Bu executed by hanging, (Note: The term yì (縊) is translated as "hang" or "strangle", though Lü Bu might not have been executed by means of a typical hanging (tying a rope around the neck and suspending from a point) because yì could also refer to an execution in a garrote-style manner (tying a rope, cord, piece of cloth or something similar around the neck and tightening it until the person died).) along with Chen Gong, Gao Shun and others. Their dead bodies were later decapitated and their heads sent to the capital Xu and then buried. (Note: (於是縊殺布。布與宮、順等皆梟首送許，然後葬之。) Sanguozhi vol. 7.) Lü Bu's trusted officer Zhang Liao was spared by Cao Cao, who appointed him as a "General of the Household" (中郎將) and granted him the peerage of a "Secondary Marquis" (關內侯).

Lü Bu's final moments recorded in the Houhanshu are slightly different from that recorded in the Sanguozhi, as the Houhanshu combined parts of the main text in the Sanguozhi with the Xiandi Chunqiu annotation, but the two accounts are generally similar. (Note: (布見操曰：「今日已往，天下定矣。」操曰：「何以言之？」布曰：「明公之所患不過於布，今已服矣。令布將騎，明公將步，天下不足定也。」顧謂劉備曰：「玄德，卿為坐上客，我為降虜，繩縛我急，獨不可一言邪？」操笑曰：「縛虎不得不急。」乃命緩布縛。劉備曰：「不可。明公不見呂布事丁建陽、董太師乎？」操頷之。) Houhanshu vol. 75.)

== Appraisal ==
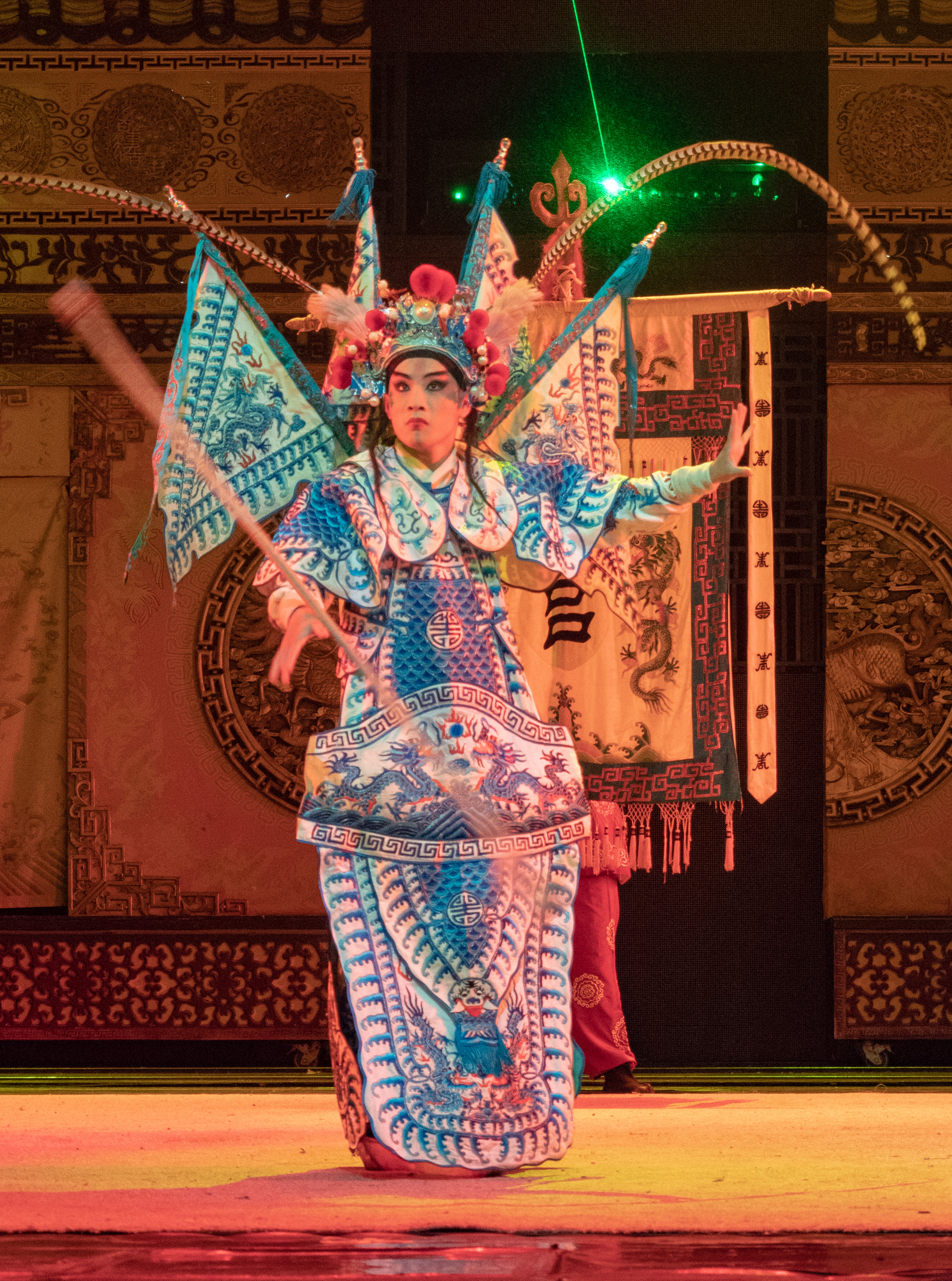
Lü Bu portrayed by a Sichuan opera actor in 2018.

Chen Shou, who wrote Lü Bu's biography in the Sanguozhi, commented:

Lü Bu possessed the might of a tiger, but he lacked the planning skills of a talented person. He was frivolous and temperamental, and was only concerned about the gains he could make. Throughout history, there had never been such persons like him who did not end up being destroyed. (Note: (評曰：呂布有虓虎之勇，而無英奇之略，輕狡反覆，唯利是視。自古及今，未有若此不夷滅也。) Sanguozhi vol. 7.)

In the main text of Lü Bu's biography, while describing the events of the Battle of Xiapi, Chen Shou also wrote:

Although Lü Bu was a valiant and powerful warrior, he lacked wisdom and was constantly suspicious of others. He was unable to control his subordinates even though he trusted them. His men had their personal motives and were very disunited, which was why he kept losing battles. (Note: (布雖驍猛，然無謀而多猜忌，不能制御其黨，但信諸將。諸將各異意自疑，故每戰多敗。) Sanguozhi vol. 7.)

Fan Ye, who wrote Lü Bu's biography in the Houhanshu, commented:

[...] Lü Bu was erratic and capricious. (Note: (贊曰：焉作庸牧，以希後福。王莽改益州曰庸部。曷云負荷？地墮身逐。術旣叨貪，布亦飜覆。) Houhanshu vol. 75.)

== Family ==
Not much about Lü Bu's family was documented in historical texts, but it is known that he had a wife and a daughter, whose names were not recorded in history. Lü Bu abandoned his wife when he was fleeing from Chang'an, but his subordinate Pang Shu (龐舒) secretly protected her and kept her with him, and returned her to her husband later. She was most prominently mentioned during the Battle of Xiapi when she cautioned Lü Bu against overly trusting Chen Gong. Lü Bu's daughter was initially arranged to be married to Yuan Shu's son as part of an alliance between Lü and Yuan, but Lü reneged on his word and took her back when she was on her way for the marriage. When Xiapi was under siege by Cao Cao's forces, Lü Bu attempted to bring his daughter out of the city so that she could be delivered to Yuan Shu, as he hoped that Yuan would send reinforcements to him after receiving his daughter. However, Lü Bu failed to break out of the siege so he returned to Xiapi with her. The eventual fates of Lü Bu's wife and daughter are not known.

In the historical novel Romance of the Three Kingdoms, Lü Bu had two wives, a concubine, and a daughter. His concubine was Diaochan, a fictional character and Wang Yun's foster daughter. She accompanied him after he killed Dong Zhuo and was mentioned to be with him during the Battle of Xiapi. Lü Bu's first wife was Lady Yan (嚴氏), who was based on Lü Bu's real-life wife (the one mentioned in historical sources). Lü Bu's second wife, who was only mentioned by name in the novel, was a fictional daughter of Cao Bao. The role played by Lü Bu's daughter in the novel was similar to that of her counterpart in actual history. She was also unnamed in the novel, but she is called "Lü Lingqi" (吕玲绮; 呂玲綺; Lǚ Língqǐ) in video games and popular culture.

== In Romance of the Three Kingdoms ==
In the 14th-century historical novel Romance of the Three Kingdoms, which dramatises the events before and during the Three Kingdoms period, Lü Bu is portrayed as a nearly invincible warrior but an incapable leader who is further marred by character flaws. While adhering to historical records in the general course of events, Luo exaggerated and sentimentalised many stories about Lü Bu, drawing inspirations from traditional operas and folklore.

See the following for some fictitious stories in Romance of the Three Kingdoms involving Lü Bu:

- Battle of Hulao Pass
- List of fictitious stories in Romance of the Three Kingdoms#Lü Bu and Diaochan
- Battle of Xiapi#In fiction

== In popular culture ==
Because of his image as an unmatched warrior in traditional folklore and in the historical novel Romance of the Three Kingdoms, Lü Bu is often held in high regard in works based on the Three Kingdoms and even in unrelated works.

Notable actors who have portrayed Lü Bu on screen include: Tong Chun Chung in The Beauty Diu Sim (1987); Zhang Guangbei in Romance of the Three Kingdoms (1994); Huang Lei in Lü Bu and Diaochan (2001); Peter Ho in Three Kingdoms (2010); Godfrey Gao in God of War, Zhao Yun (2016); Yu Shirota in The Untold Tale of the Three Kingdoms (2020); Louis Koo in Dynasty Warriors (2021). Notable actors who have portrayed Lü Bu on stage include Yang Li-hua in Taiwanese opera Diaochan and Lü Bu (1991); Wang Zhiliang in Cantonese opera Love in War (2022).

Lü Bu appears as a playable character in Koei's video games based on Romance of the Three Kingdoms, including the strategy game series of the same title as the novel, the action game series Dynasty Warriors and Warriors Orochi, and Wo Long: Fallen Dynasty. In the games, his name is spelled as "Lu Bu" without the double-dot over the "u" in "Lu". He also appears as a boss in the ARPG published by Koei Tecmo and developed by Team Ninja, Wolong: Fallen Dynasty. Other non-Koei titles in which Lü Bu appear include the Creative Assembly's Total War: Three Kingdoms, Capcom's Destiny of an Emperor, Neo Geo's World Heroes 2 Jet, Fate/Extra, Puzzle & Dragons, and Arena of Valor. Additionally, Lü Bu is referenced as character skins in the games Overwatch (Reaper) and League of Legends (Jarvan IV).

Lü Bu appears in the video game Fate/EXTRA as a Berserker-class Servant possessed by Rani VIII. He later appears in the same class as a Servant able to be summoned by the protagonist in the mobile game Fate/Grand Order. He reappears in Fate/Extella and Fate/Extella Link as a playable Servant.

Lü Bu appears as a girl in the manga-anime Ikki Tousen, Ryofuko-chan, and Koihime Musō. In these media, Lü Bu is usually known by the Japanese name Ryofu Hōsen.

In the collectible card game Magic: The Gathering, there is a card named "Lu Bu, Master-at-Arms", in the Portal Three Kingdoms set.

Lü Bu appears as a character in the manga Record of Ragnarok, regarded as "The Strongest Man in Human History." He is the first combatant on the human side, and confronts the god Thor in the battle of Ragnarok. His backstory was retold as a bored man with no competition who can match his strength. He is also the main character of the spin-off manga Ryo Fu Hō Sen Hishōden. In the anime adaptation of Record of Ragnarok he is voiced in the original Japanese by Tomokazu Seki & in the English dub by Kaiji Tang.

In The God of Highschool, Lü Bu appeared as a source of borrowed power for Yu Mira. Mira's borrowed power is of the general, which is loosely based on the historical figure of the same name. This power gives her several abilities such as enhanced strength and the ability to summon a red horse (based on Red Hare, the legendary steed of Lü Bu).

Lu Bu is a playable character in the Mobile/PC Game Rise of Kingdoms.

The Swedish power-metal band Sabaton released the song A Tiger Among Dragons on their 2025 album Legends, which centers on the life and deeds of Lü Bu.

== See also ==
- Lists of people of the Three Kingdoms
