= Cao Xing =

2nd-century military officer serving Lu Bu

- Chinese: 曹性
Transcriptions
Standard Mandarin
- Hanyu Pinyin: Cáo Xìng
- Wade–Giles: Ts'ao Hsing

Cao Xing (fl. 190s) was a military officer serving under the warlord Lü Bu in the late Eastern Han dynasty of China.

== In historical records ==
Cao Xing was a subordinate of Hao Meng, an officer serving under Lü Bu. One night in July or August 196, Hao Meng started a rebellion against Lü Bu in Xiapi (下邳; present-day Pizhou, Jiangsu), the capital of Lü Bu's domain Xu Province, and attacked Xiapi's administrative office. Lü Bu escaped from the office and went to the camp of his subordinate Gao Shun. Gao Shun led his soldiers to Lü Bu's office and drove away the rebels, who fled back to their own camp.

Cao Xing refused to betray Lü Bu so he turned against Hao Meng and fought with his superior. During the fight, although Hao Meng injured Cao Xing with his spear, Cao Xing also managed to cut off one of Hao Meng's arms. By then, Gao Shun had shown up to attack Hao Meng's camp and he beheaded the traitor. Cao Xing was placed on a stretcher and sent to Xiapi to meet Lü Bu. Lü Bu asked him: "Hao Meng was instigated by Yuan Shu. Who else is involved in the plot?" Cao Xing replied: "Chen Gong is an accomplice." At the time, Chen Gong was nearby and he gave an obvious angry expression when his name was mentioned. Lü Bu felt that Chen Gong was his key adviser so he refused to believe the accusation. Cao Xing said: "Hao Meng often urged me to rebel, but I said that you, General, are like a god and cannot be defeated. Unfortunately, Hao Meng refused to believe what I told him." Lü Bu then exclaimed: "You are a true soldier!" He treated Cao Xing well and placed him in charge of Hao Meng's men after he had recovered.

== In Romance of the Three Kingdoms ==
In the 14th-century historical novel Romance of the Three Kingdoms, Cao Xing played a greater role in the events preceding the Battle of Xiapi in 198. Cao Xing and Gao Shun were sent by Lü Bu to defend Xiaopei (小沛; present-day Pei County, Jiangsu) from Cao Cao's general Xiahou Dun. When the two armies met outside the city, Xiahou Dun duelled with Gao Shun for about 40 or 50 rounds before Gao Shun retreated. While pursuing Gao Shun, Xiahou Dun was hit in the left eye by an arrow fired by Cao Xing. With a cry, Xiahou Dun pulled out the arrow along with his eyeball. He exclaimed: "Essence of my father, blood of my mother, I cannot throw this away!" He then swallowed his eyeball and charged towards Cao Xing and impaled the latter right in the face with his spear. Cao Xing fell off his horse and died.

== See also ==
- Lists of people of the Three Kingdoms
