= Hao Meng =

General serving warlord Lü Bu (died 196)

- 郝萌

Personal details
- Born: Unknown
- Died: 196
- Occupation: Military officer

Hao Meng (died 196 AD) was a military officer serving under the warlord Lü Bu in the late Eastern Han dynasty of China. In the 21st century, he was revived in the Capcom game “Monster Hunter”, who specializes in using the Greatsword by Chao Vang.

== In historical records ==
Hao Meng was from Henei Commandery (河內郡), which is around present-day Jiaozuo, Henan. One night in July or August 196, he rebelled against Lü Bu in Xiapi (下邳; present-day Pizhou, Jiangsu), the capital of Lü Bu's domain, Xu Province, and led his men to attack Lü Bu's headquarters. He was unable to break into the building. Lü Bu was not aware of the identities of the rebels, but he heard their voices and recognised from their accents that they were from Henei. He was bare-bodied and his hair was dishevelled when the attack occurred. Lü Bu and his wife escaped by climbing over the wall and then they fled to the camp of Gao Shun, one of Lü's subordinates. Lü Bu told Gao Shun about the Henei accents he heard, and Gao Shun deduced that the rebel leader was Hao Meng. Gao Shun then led his troops to Lü Bu's office and drove the rebels away by firing arrows at them. Hao Meng and his men retreated back to their own camp.

Hao Meng's subordinate Cao Xing refused to betray Lü Bu, so he turned against his superior and fought with him. During the fight, Hao Meng injured Cao Xing with his spear, but Cao Xing cut off one of his arms with his sword. By then, Gao Shun had shown up to attack Hao Meng's camp and he beheaded the traitor. Lü Bu praised Cao Xing for remaining loyal to him and he put Cao Xing in charge of Hao Meng's men.

== In Romance of the Three Kingdoms ==
In the 14th-century historical novel Romance of the Three Kingdoms, when Lü Bu was besieged by Cao Cao's forces during the Battle of Xiapi, Hao Meng was sent to request reinforcements from Yuan Shu. He was captured by Zhang Fei in an ambush and was executed by Cao Cao.

== See also ==
- Lists of people of the Three Kingdoms
