= Han Xian (Han dynasty) =

Chinese bandit leader and general (died 197)

- 韓暹

General-in-Chief (大將軍)
- In office 196
- Monarch: Emperor Xian of Han

Colonel-Director of Retainers (司隸校尉)
- In office 196
- Monarch: Emperor Xian of Han

Personal details
- Born: Unknown
- Died: 197
- Occupation: General, bandit leader

Han Xian (died 197) was a bandit leader and military general who lived during the late Eastern Han dynasty of China.

== Life ==
Han Xian was a leader among the White Wave Bandits.

In 195, Emperor Xian, who had been a puppet emperor under the control of the generals Li Jue and Guo Si since 192, managed to escape from their clutches in Chang'an, the imperial capital, and return to the old capital, Luoyang. Li Jue and Guo Si later regretted their decision to let Emperor Xian leave Chang'an, so they led their troops to pursue the emperor.

Yang Feng, a former White Wave bandit, led his troops to fight Li Jue and Guo Si in an attempt to defend the emperor, but lost the battle. He then summoned his old friends, the White Wave Bandits led by Li Le (李樂), Han Xian, Hu Cai (胡才) and others, to come to Emperor Xian's aid. Xiongnu forces led by Qubei also responded to the call and came to help Emperor Xian. They continued on their journey towards Luoyang after that. Li Jue and Guo Si quickly returned with more troops and defeated Yang Feng and killed several officials who fled with Emperor Xian. The emperor escaped across the Yellow River and reached Anyi (安邑).

Around August 196, Emperor Xian returned to Luoyang under the escort of Yang Feng, Dong Cheng and the White Wave bandits. In recognition of their contributions, he appointed Han Xian as General-in-Chief (大將軍) and Colonel-Director of Retainers (司隸校尉). Han Xian and Dong Cheng remained in Luoyang with their troops to protect Emperor Xian. Around the same time, the warlord Cao Cao led his forces into Luoyang, found Emperor Xian, and escorted him to his base in Xu (許; present-day Xuchang, Henan), which became the new imperial capital. Han Xian attempted to stop Cao Cao but was defeated by him in battle, so he fled south to join the warlord Yuan Shu.

After joining Yuan Shu, Han Xian and Yang Feng (who also came to join Yuan Shu) pillaged and looted several counties in Yang and Xu provinces. In 197, Yuan Shu wanted to declare himself emperor and desired to have a neighbouring warlord, Lü Bu, as an ally, so he proposed a marriage between his son and Lü Bu's daughter. However, Lü Bu rejected the proposal after listening to Chen Gui's advice. In anger, Yuan Shu ordered his general Zhang Xun (張勳), with Yang Feng and Han Xian as his subordinates, to lead troops to attack Lü Bu. Lü Bu heeded Chen Gui's suggestion and managed to induce Yang Feng and Han Xian to turn against Yuan Shu. Yang Feng and Han Xian then joined Lü Bu in attacking Yuan Shu's forces, led by Zhang Xun, and defeated the enemy. After driving back Zhang Xun, Yang Feng and Han Xian led their men to pillage several territories until Zhongli (鍾離) before turning back.

Later in 197, they were ordered by Lü Bu to lead their troops to loot the warlord Liu Bei's supplies however Liu Bei successfully lured them into a trap and killed Yang Feng while Han Xian managed to escape. Han Xian left Yuan Shu and headed north back to his native Bing Province. Along the way, he was intercepted and killed by Zhang Xuan (張宣), the Prefect of Shuqiu County (抒秋縣).

== See also ==
- Lists of people of the Three Kingdoms
