= Records of Heroes =

Chinese historical text of the end of the Han dynasty

The Records of Heroes (英雄記), also known as the Records of Late Han Heroes (漢末英雄記) is a Chinese historical text of the end of the Han dynasty. Written by contemporary historian Wang Can, it contains various stories of the late Han warlords. The book was lost at some point in history, and the only surviving accounts of it are from the Annotated Records of the Three Kingdoms by Pei Songzhi as fragmentary annotations. During the Ming dynasty, Wang Shijian (王世間) compiled these fragments and published them as a collection.

The exact year in which it was written cannot be ascertained. However, among its stories which are clearly defined by year, was the anecdote that "in the middle of Battle of Red Cliff (208 CE), Cao Cao tried to cross the Yangtze River by connecting lots of rafts, however, as Zhou Yu delivered fire attacks on it, Cao Cao had to retreat" It is likely that the book was written between 208 and 217 when Wang Can died.

The Book of Sui recorded that "There were eight volumes by Wang Can named Records of Late Han Heroes. They are lost. There were 10 volumes during the Liang (梁) period."

The Old Book of Tang recorded that "[one of] Wang Can's ten volumes were named Records of Late Han Heroes". Here it is likely that Records of Late Han Heroes is identical to Records of Heroes.

Regarding the words "Late Han" in the title, the Annotated Bibliography of the Four Treasuries argued that "presumably, Wang Can died when the Han dynasty still existed. Though there were so many symptoms that the Han dynasty was near its death, Emperor Xian still was on the throne. Wang Can surely could not use the words of "Late Han" as the title of his book, therefore "Late Han" is thought to be introduced by future generations. However, as Wang Can described Cao Cao as "holy ruler" (聖君) in his "A Poem of Military Service" (從軍詩), we cannot say with full certainty that Wang Can did not put "Late Han" in the title of his book".
