= 207 =

207 in various calendars
- Gregorian calendar: 207; CCVII
- Ab urbe condita: 960
- Assyrian calendar: 4957
- Balinese saka calendar: 128–129
- Bengali calendar: −387 – −386
- Berber calendar: 1157
- Buddhist calendar: 751
- Burmese calendar: −431
- Byzantine calendar: 5715–5716
- Chinese calendar: 丙戌年 (Fire Dog); 2904 or 2697 — to — 丁亥年 (Fire Pig); 2905 or 2698
- Coptic calendar: −77 – −76
- Discordian calendar: 1373
- Ethiopian calendar: 199–200
- Hebrew calendar: 3967–3968
- Hindu calendars
- Vikram Samvat: 263–264
- Shaka Samvat: 128–129
- Kali Yuga: 3307–3308
- Holocene calendar: 10207
- Iranian calendar: 415 BP – 414 BP
- Islamic calendar: 428 BH – 427 BH
- Javanese calendar: 84–85
- Julian calendar: 207; CCVII
- Korean calendar: 2540
- Minguo calendar: 1705 before ROC 民前1705年
- Nanakshahi calendar: −1261
- Seleucid era: 518/519 AG
- Thai solar calendar: 749–750
- Tibetan calendar: མེ་ཕོ་ཁྱི་ལོ་ (male Fire-Dog); 333 or −48 or −820 — to — མེ་མོ་ཕག་ལོ་ (female Fire-Boar); 334 or −47 or −819

Year 207 (CCVII) was a common year starting on Thursday of the Julian calendar. At the time, it was known in Rome as the Year of the Consulship of Maximus and Severus (or, less frequently, year 960 Ab urbe condita). The denomination 207 for this year has been used since the early medieval period, when the Anno Domini calendar era became the prevalent method in Europe for naming years.

== Events ==
=== By place ===
==== China ====
- Battle of White Wolf Mountain: Warlord Cao Cao defeats the Wuhuan tribes, sending the Wuhuan into decline.

== Births ==
- Liu Shan (or Gongsi), Chinese emperor (d. 271)

== Deaths ==
- Guo Jia, Chinese adviser and official (b. 170)
- Tadun, Chinese chieftain of the Wuhuan tribe
- Yuan Shang, Chinese warlord and governor
- Yuan Xi (or Xianyong), Chinese warlord
- Zhang Xiu, Chinese general and warlord
