= Qiuliju =

2nd-century leader of the Wuhuan tribes

- Chinese: 丘力居
Transcriptions
Standard Mandarin
- Hanyu Pinyin: Qiūlìjū

Qiuliju (fl. 180s–190s) was a leader of the Wuhuan tribes in Liaoxi Commandery (commandery capital in present-day Yi County, Liaodong) during the late Eastern Han dynasty of China. He had about 5,000 tribal clans under his rule.

== Life ==
Around 187, the Han minister Zhang Wen recruited 3,000 Wuhuan elite cavalry from You Province to assist Han government forces in suppressing the Liang Province rebellion. Zhang Chun (張純), a former official serving in Zhongshan Princedom (中山國), requested to be appointed as the commander of the Wuhuan cavalry. Zhang Wen denied his request and put Gongsun Zan in charge of the cavalry instead. However, when the Wuhuan cavalry reached Ji (薊; around present-day Beijing), many of them deserted and went home due to lack of supplies. Zhang Chun felt disgruntled when his request was denied, so he secretly formed an alliance with Zhang Ju (張舉), a former administrator of Taishan Commandery, and the Wuhuan leader Qiuliju. The three of them combined forces to start a rebellion by attacking and plundering Ji. They also killed a colonel Gongqi Chou (公綦稠), Youbeiping Commandery's administrator Liu Zheng (劉政), Liaodong Commandery's administrator Yang Zhong (陽終), and others. Their forces numbered over 100,000 troops and were based in Feiru County (肥如縣; east of present-day Qian'an, Hebei). Zhang Ju declared himself emperor to challenge the reigning Han emperor, Emperor Ling, for the Mandate of Heaven.

Zhang Chun and his rebel forces raided and plundered several Han territories in Qing, Xu, You and Ji provinces, killing thousands of Han officials and civilians. Towards the end of Emperor Ling's reign, when Liu Yu took office as the Governor of You Province, he recruited the tribal peoples in northeast China to assist him in suppressing the rebellion. Liu Yu was successful; Zhang Chun was killed and peace was restored in the region.

When Qiuliju died, his son Louban (樓班) was still young, so he was succeeded by a younger relative, Tadun, as the new leader of the Wuhuan tribes.

== See also ==
- Lists of people of the Three Kingdoms
