= Qian'an, Hebei =

Qian'an 迁安市 Tsienan
- County-level & Sub-prefectural city
- Location in Hebei
- Coordinates: 39°59′56″N 118°42′04″E
- Country: People's Republic of China
- Province: Hebei
- Prefecture-level city: Tangshan

Area
  - County-level & Sub-prefectural city: 1,227.0 km^{2} (473.7 sq mi)
  - Urban: 128.10 km^{2} (49.46 sq mi)

Population (2021)
  - County-level & Sub-prefectural city: 775,813
  - Density: 632.28/km^{2} (1,637.6/sq mi)
  - Urban: 319,384
- Time zone: UTC+8 (China Standard)

Qian'an (simplified Chinese: 迁安; traditional Chinese: 遷安; pinyin: Qiān'ān) is a county-level city in the northeast of Hebei province, China. It is under the administration of the prefecture-level city of Tangshan. The city spans an area of 1,227 square kilometres (474 mi^{2}), and has a population of 775,813 as of 2021.

== Toponymy ==
The area of present-day Qian'an had historically been part of Anxi County (安喜县; 安喜縣; Ānxǐ Xiàn) during the Liao and the Jin dynasties. In 1167, during the Jin dynasty, the area was renamed to Qian'an County (迁安县; 遷安縣; Qiān'ān Xiàn), whose name literally means "moved from Anxi".

== History ==
The area of present-day Qian'an has hosted human activity since the Paleolithic and Neolithic ages.

The area had belonged to the state of Guzhu during the time period corresponding to the Shang and Zhou dynasties.

During the Spring and Autumn period, the area was part of Lingqi (令支国; 令支國; Lìngqí Guó), a Shanrong state. In 664 BCE, Lingqi and Guzhu were invaded by the state of Qi, led by Duke Huan of Qi and Guan Zhong.

After the military success of Qi, the area of present-day Qian'an was absorbed into the state of Yan. The area remained part of Yan throughout the Warring States period.

During the Qin dynasty, in 221 BCE, the area was organized as Lizhi County (离支县; 離支縣; Lízhī Xiàn), and was placed under the jurisdiction of Liaoxi Commandery.

The area was reorganized as Linzhi County (令支县; 令支縣; Lìngzhī Xiàn) during the Han dynasty, but remained under the jurisdiction of Liaoxi Commandery.

The area belonged to the Xianbei state during the early Jin dynasty. In 285 CE, Emperor Wu of Jin successfully led an army against Xianbei chief Murong Hui to conquer Feiru (肥如; Féirú), an area corresponding to the northeastern portion of present-day Qian'an.

In 446 CE, during the Northern Wei, Lingzhi was merged into Yangle County (阳乐县; 陽樂縣; Yánglè Xiàn).

During the Northern Qi, the area was reorganized into Feiru County (肥如县; 肥如縣; Féirú Xiàn).

The area was reorganized numerous times during the Sui dynasty. In 586 CE, Feiru County was merged into Xinchang County (新昌县; 新昌縣; Xīnchāng Xiàn). In 598 CE, Xinchang County was renamed to Lulong County (卢龙县; 盧龍縣; Lúlóng Xiàn), which was under the jurisdiction of Beiping Commandery.

The area was put under the jurisdiction of Anxi County (安喜县; 安喜縣; Ānxǐ Xiàn) during the Liao dynasty.

In 1167, during the Jin dynasty, Anxi County was renamed to Qian'an County (迁安县; 遷安縣; Qiān'ān Xiàn). In the 13th century, Qian'an County was briefly abolished, and merged into Lulong County, although this was quickly undone.

During the Ming dynasty, Qian'an County belonged to Yongping Prefecture (永平府; Yǒngpíng Fǔ), within North Zhili province.

During the first phases of the Qing's conquest of the Ming, Qian'an was captured by Hong Taiji's armies. Against Hong's orders, the city was the sight of an incident of civilian-slaughter ordered by the field commander. During the Qing dynasty, Qian'an County and Yongping Prefecture belonged to Zhili province.

In 1912, Qian'an County was placed under Jinhai Circuit (津海道; Jīnhǎi Dào), part of Zhili province. Jinhai Circuit was briefly reorganized as Bohai Circuit (渤海道; Bóhǎi Dào) in 1913, although this was promptly undone in 1914. In 1928, Zhili province was reorganized as Hebei province.

Upon its liberation from Imperial Japan in 1945, Qian'an County was placed under the 16th Jidong Prefecture (冀东十六专区; 冀東十六專區; Jìdōng Shíliù Zhuānqū). On August 1, 1949, Qian'an County was placed under the prefecture of Tangshan.

On December 20, 1958, Lulong County and Qianxi County were abolished and merged into Qian'an County. This change was reverted on July 9, 1961.

On October 10, 1996, the provincial government of Hebei legislated the reorganization of Qian'an County as the county-level city of Qian'an, which it remains today. On October 24, Qian'an was placed under the jurisdiction of the prefecture-level city of Tangshan. Qian'an was formally reorganized as a county-level city on November 26.

== Administrative divisions ==
Qian'an administers 4 subdistricts and 17 towns.

=== Subdistricts ===
The city's 4 subdistricts are Yongshun Subdistrict (永顺街道), Xing'an Subdistrict (兴安街道), Binhe Subdistrict (滨河街道), and Yangdianzi Subdistrict (杨店子街道).

=== Towns ===
The city's 17 towns are Xiaguanying (夏官营镇), Yanggezhuang (杨各庄镇), Jianchangying (建昌营镇), Zhaodianzi (赵店子镇), Yejituo (野鸡坨镇), Dacuizhuang (大崔庄镇), Caiyuan (蔡园镇), Malanzhuang (马兰庄镇), Shaheyi (沙河驿镇), Muchangkou (木厂口镇), Shangsheyanzhuang (上射雁庄镇), Taipingzhuang (太平庄镇), Kouzhuang (扣庄镇), Dawuli (大五里镇), Wuchong'an (五重安镇), Pengdianzi (彭店子镇), and Yanjiadian.

== Geography ==
Qian'an is located in the northeast of the prefecture-level city of Tangshan, itself located within the northeastern portion of Hebei province. Qian'an is bordered by Lulong County, across the Qinglong River to the east, Qianxi County to the west, Luanzhou to the south, and Qinglong Manchu Autonomous County to the north. Located at the southern foot of the Yan Mountains, Qian'an's elevation is generally higher in the northwest, and lower in the southeast. The highest point in Qian'an is Mount Dazuizi (大嘴子山; Dàzuǐzi Shān), located in the north of the city, which reaches an elevation of 695.7 metres (2,282 ft). Major rivers in Qian'an include the Luan River, the Qinglong River, and the Sha River.

=== Climate ===
Climate data for Qian'an, elevation 51 m (167 ft), (1991–2020 normals, extremes 1981–2025)
| Month | Jan | Feb | Mar | Apr | May | Jun | Jul | Aug | Sep | Oct | Nov | Dec | Year |
|---|---|---|---|---|---|---|---|---|---|---|---|---|---|
| Record high °C (°F) | 11.7 (53.1) | 18.2 (64.8) | 28.4 (83.1) | 31.5 (88.7) | 35.7 (96.3) | 39.2 (102.6) | 39.2 (102.6) | 36.9 (98.4) | 35.9 (96.6) | 31.0 (87.8) | 21.4 (70.5) | 12.9 (55.2) | 39.2 (102.6) |
| Mean daily maximum °C (°F) | 1.2 (34.2) | 5.1 (41.2) | 12.0 (53.6) | 19.9 (67.8) | 26.1 (79.0) | 29.4 (84.9) | 30.7 (87.3) | 30.1 (86.2) | 26.5 (79.7) | 19.0 (66.2) | 9.6 (49.3) | 2.5 (36.5) | 17.7 (63.8) |
| Daily mean °C (°F) | −5.4 (22.3) | −1.7 (28.9) | 5.1 (41.2) | 13.2 (55.8) | 19.4 (66.9) | 23.3 (73.9) | 25.7 (78.3) | 24.9 (76.8) | 19.9 (67.8) | 12.0 (53.6) | 3.2 (37.8) | −3.3 (26.1) | 11.4 (52.5) |
| Mean daily minimum °C (°F) | −10.6 (12.9) | −7.2 (19.0) | −0.8 (30.6) | 6.6 (43.9) | 12.6 (54.7) | 17.8 (64.0) | 21.5 (70.7) | 20.4 (68.7) | 14.3 (57.7) | 6.2 (43.2) | −1.7 (28.9) | −7.9 (17.8) | 5.9 (42.7) |
| Record low °C (°F) | −26.7 (−16.1) | −23.7 (−10.7) | −12.3 (9.9) | −5.0 (23.0) | 2.0 (35.6) | 7.6 (45.7) | 13.8 (56.8) | 10.7 (51.3) | 1.4 (34.5) | −5.4 (22.3) | −15.9 (3.4) | −26.0 (−14.8) | −26.7 (−16.1) |
| Average precipitation mm (inches) | 2.7 (0.11) | 3.9 (0.15) | 7.4 (0.29) | 22.4 (0.88) | 41.4 (1.63) | 87.6 (3.45) | 193.0 (7.60) | 159.2 (6.27) | 56.4 (2.22) | 30.0 (1.18) | 13.3 (0.52) | 2.8 (0.11) | 620.1 (24.41) |
| Average precipitation days (≥ 0.1 mm) | 1.9 | 2.2 | 3.0 | 4.9 | 7.2 | 10.1 | 12.5 | 10.4 | 6.4 | 4.8 | 3.1 | 2.2 | 68.7 |
| Average snowy days | 2.9 | 2.4 | 1.4 | 0.3 | 0 | 0 | 0 | 0 | 0 | 0.2 | 1.9 | 2.8 | 11.9 |
| Average relative humidity (%) | 51 | 49 | 46 | 47 | 54 | 67 | 78 | 79 | 71 | 66 | 60 | 54 | 60 |
| Mean monthly sunshine hours | 189.4 | 192.5 | 241.8 | 252.8 | 280.7 | 238.0 | 205.1 | 228.4 | 229.8 | 217.2 | 177.1 | 178.4 | 2,631.2 |
| Percentage possible sunshine | 63 | 63 | 65 | 63 | 63 | 53 | 45 | 54 | 62 | 64 | 60 | 62 | 60 |
Source: China Meteorological Administration October all-time Record

== Demographics ==
As of 2021, Qian'an has a population of 775,813, residing in 231,147 households, giving it an average household size of 3.36. Per the 2010 Chinese Census, Qian'an had a population of 728,160, up from the 632,704 recorded in the 2000 Chinese Census. A 1996 estimate put the city's population at approximately 641,000.

The city has an urban population of 319,384 (41.17% of its total population), with the remaining 456,429 people (58.83%) living in rural areas. As of 2021, Qian'an has a per capita disposable income of 48,373 renminbi (RMB) among urban residents, and 29,998 RMB among rural residents.

=== Ethnic groups ===
As of 2021, 35 different ethnic groups live in Qian'an. 95.99% of the city's population is ethnically Han Chinese, with the remaining 4.01% belonging to ethnic minorities. The largest such minority is the Manchu people, which, as of 2021 number 21,466 (2.77% of its total population). Other sizeable minority groups within Qian'an include the Hui, which number 6,466 (0.83%), and the Mongols, which number 1,157 (0.15%). Qian'an hosts 12 designated ethnic villages, of which, 10 are Hui ethnic villages, and 2 are Manchu ethnic villages.

== Economy ==
Qian'an recorded a gross domestic product (GDP) of 116.03 billion renminbi (RMB) in 2021, a 6.7% increase from 2020. Of this, 3.29 billion RMB (2.84% of its total GDP) came from the city's primary sector, 77.91 billion RMB (67.15%) came from its secondary sector, and 34.83 billion RMB (30.02%) came from its tertiary sector.

Major mineral resources within Qian'an include iron ore, limestone, quartz, feldspar, flint, graphite, kaolinte, and bentonite.

In 2021, Qian'an recorded 26.67 billion RMB in foreign trade.

=== Agriculture ===
Major crops grown in Qian'an include maize, peanuts, wheat, sweet potato, soybean, millet, muskmelon, watermelon, Brassica rapa, cucumber, spinach, tomatoes, green peppers, zucchini, radishes, onions, garlic, beans, and mushrooms. In 2021, 451,483.5 mu (30,098.9 hectares or 74,376 acres) of land within Qian'an were devoted to sowing maize, and the city yielded 171,000 tonnes of maize; 142,261.5 mu (9,484.1 ha or 23,436 acres) were used for growing peanuts, and the city yielded 32,300 tonnes (31,800 long tons; 35,600 short tons) of peanuts; 12,709.5 mu (847.300 ha or 2,093.72 acres) of land were used for growing wheat, and the city yielded 4,500 tonnes of wheat. In 2021, 1,604 hectares (3,960 acres) of land were used for growing sweet potatoes, and the city yielded 38,200 tonnes of sweet potatoes.

=== Industry ===
Major industries in Qian'an include iron mining and iron powder production, pig iron production, steel production, coke production, cement production, plate glass production, and the production of paper and cardboard.

== Notable people ==
- Gongsun Zan, general and warlord
- Han Dang, general
