= Guo Jia =

Adviser to the warlord Cao Cao (170-207)

- 郭嘉

Libationer under the Minister of Works (司空祭酒) (under Cao Cao)
- In office 196 or after – 207
- Monarch: Emperor Xian of Han

Personal details
- Born: 170 (Note: de Crespigny (2007, p. 285). Guo Jia's biography in the Sanguozhi recorded that he fell ill after departing from Liucheng (柳城; in present-day Chaoyang County, Liaoning) following Cao Cao's victory at the Battle of White Wolf Mountain in late September or early October 207. He was 38 years old (by East Asian age reckoning) at that time and he died not long later. (Note: (年三十八，自柳城還，疾篤，太祖問疾者交錯。及薨， ...) Sanguozhi vol. 14.) By calculation, Guo Jia's birth year should be around 170.) Yuzhou, Henan
- Died: c.October 207 (aged 37)
- Children: Guo Yi
- Occupation: Adviser
- Courtesy name: Fengxiao (奉孝)
- Posthumous name: Marquis Zhen (貞侯)
- Peerage: Marquis of Weiyang Village (洧陽亭侯)

Guo Jia (170– c.October 207), courtesy name Fengxiao, was a military adviser to the warlord Cao Cao during the late Eastern Han dynasty of China. Throughout his 11 years of service, Guo Jia aided Cao Cao greatly with his brilliance and foresight, and his strategies were instrumental to Cao Cao's triumphs over rival warlords such as Lü Bu and Yuan Shao. For example, four years before Cao Cao's decisive victory over Yuan Shao at the Battle of Guandu, Guo Jia already foresaw that Cao Cao would win when he pointed out ten advantages Cao Cao had over Yuan Shao.

== Historical sources on Guo Jia's life ==
The authoritative historical source on Guo Jia's life is the Records of the Three Kingdoms (Sanguozhi), which was written by Chen Shou in the third century. In the fifth century, Pei Songzhi annotated the Sanguozhi by incorporating information from other sources to Chen Shou's original work and adding his personal commentary. Some alternative texts used in the annotations to Guo Jia's biography include: Fu Zi, by Fu Xuan; Wei Shu (Book of Wei), by Wang Chen, Xun Yi and Ruan Ji; Shiyu (Accounts of this Generation), by Guo Song.

== Early life ==
Guo Jia was from Yangzhai County (陽翟縣), Yingchuan Commandery (潁川郡), which is in present-day Yuzhou, Henan. (Note: (郭嘉字奉孝，潁川陽翟人也。) Sanguozhi vol. 14.) As a youth, he was famous for his intelligence and foresight. Since reaching adulthood at around the age of 19, Guo Jia had been travelling around the country and befriending members of the scholar-gentry and other talented persons. He did not associate himself with the hoi polloi and was thus not very well known outside of his circles. However, all those who knew him recognised his talent and felt that he was extraordinary. When he was 26, he served in the Han government as a minor official in the office of the Minister over the Masses (司徒). (Note: (傅子曰：嘉少有遠量。漢末天下將亂。自弱冠匿名迹，密交結英儁，不與俗接，故時人多莫知，惟識達者奇之。年二十七，辟司徒府。) Fu Zi annotation in Sanguozhi vol. 14.)

Guo Jia once travelled to Hebei to meet Yuan Shao, an influential warlord who controlled most of northern China at the time. He later told Yuan Shao's advisers Xin Ping and Guo Tu, "An intelligent adviser should be prudent when he chooses which lord he wishes to serve so that his lord will heed every piece of advice he gives. The adviser can then establish his reputation. Lord Yuan (Yuan Shao) wishes to mimic the Duke of Zhou by recruiting men of talent to serve under him but he does not know how to tap into their abilities. He focuses too much on unnecessary details and neglects the main points; he likes to listen to many ideas but is indecisive. It is difficult for him to save the Empire from its troubles and achieve hegemony over the various warlords!" Guo Jia then left Yuan Shao. (Note: (初，北見袁紹，謂紹謀臣辛評、郭圖曰：「夫智者審於量主，故百舉百全而功名可立也。袁公徒欲效周公之下士，而未知用人之機。多端寡要，好謀無決，欲與共濟天下大難，定霸王之業，難矣！」於是遂去之。) Sanguozhi vol. 14.)

== Coming to serve Cao Cao ==
Around the time, Cao Cao had a brilliant adviser, Xi Zhicai (戲志才), whom he appreciated greatly, but Xi died early. Cao Cao told another adviser Xun Yu, "Ever since Xi Zhicai died, I've been lacking someone whom I can form strategies with. I heard there are many talents in the Ru and Ying regions. Who can replace Xi Zhicai?" Xun Yu recommended Guo Jia to Cao Cao. Cao Cao and Guo Jia had a discussion on the affairs of their time, after which the former remarked: "This must be the man who will help me achieve greatness." Guo Jia also happily said, "He's truly the lord I wish to serve." Guo Jia was then appointed as a Libationer (祭酒) in the army of Cao Cao, who then held the position of Minister over the Masses (司空) in the Han imperial court. (Note: (先是時，潁川戲志才，籌畫士也，太祖甚器之。早卒。太祖與荀彧書曰：「自志才亡後，莫可與計事者。汝、潁固多奇士，誰可以繼之？」彧薦嘉。召見，論天下事。太祖曰：「使孤成大業者，必此人也。」嘉出，亦喜曰：「真吾主也。」表為司空軍祭酒。) Sanguozhi vol. 14.)

=== Evaluation of Cao Cao's advantages over Yuan Shao ===
The Fu Zi recorded a detailed conversation between Guo Jia and Cao Cao, in which the former carefully pointed out ten advantages the latter had over Yuan Shao. (Note: (對曰：「劉、項之不敵，公所知也。漢祖唯智勝；項羽雖彊，終為所禽。嘉竊料之，紹有十敗，公有十勝，雖兵彊，無能為也。) Fu Zi annotation in Sanguozhi vol. 14.) Cao Cao asked Guo Jia, "Benchu (Yuan Shao) rules Ji, Qing and Bing provinces and has vast territories and large numbers of troops under his command. However, he has also been making offensive moves. I intend to attack him, but my forces are weaker than his, so what should I do?" (Note: (傅子曰：太祖謂嘉曰：「本初擁冀州之衆，青、并從之，地廣兵彊，而數為不遜。吾欲討之，力不敵，如何？」) Fu Zi annotation in Sanguozhi vol. 14.)

Guo Jia replied,

"Everyone has heard of the rivalry between Liu Bang and Xiang Yu. Liu Bang won by strategy; Xiang Yu was very powerful but he still lost to Liu Bang. Based on my observations, Yuan Shao has ten disadvantages while you have ten advantages. (Yuan Shao) may have many troops but they are useless.

1. Yuan Shao is overly concerned with formalities, while you behave naturally. You win him in principle. (Note: (紹繁禮多儀，公體任自然，此道勝一也。) Fu Zi annotation in Sanguozhi vol. 14.)
2. Yuan Shao attempts to achieve supremacy from an opposing position, while you use the Han Empire's authority to command respect. You win him in righteousness. (Note: (紹以逆動，公奉順以率天下，此義勝二也。) Fu Zi annotation in Sanguozhi vol. 14.)
3. The Han dynasty declined due to a lack of discipline and law enforcement. Yuan Shao condones his followers and their ill discipline, so he fails in administration. You uphold discipline sternly and firmly among your followers. You win him in management. (Note: (漢末政失於寬，紹以寬濟寬，故不攝，公糾之以猛而上下知制，此治勝三也。) Fu Zi annotation in Sanguozhi vol. 14.)
4. Yuan Shao appears to be welcoming and accepting but he is actually jealous and suspicious. He never fully trusts his followers and places faith only in his family members and close relatives. You appear simple on the outside but you are actually very discerning on the inside. You fully trust those you have placed your faith in, and you promote meritocracy. You win him in tolerance. (Note: (紹外寬內忌，用人而疑之，所任唯親戚子弟，公外易簡而內機明，用人無疑，唯才所宜，不間遠近，此度勝四也。) Fu Zi annotation in Sanguozhi vol. 14.)
5. Yuan Shao likes to listen to many ideas but is indecisive and he hesitates before he makes any move. You are decisive and you adapt to changes well. You win him in strategy. (Note: (紹多謀少決，失在後事，公策得輒行，應變無窮，此謀勝五也。) Fu Zi annotation in Sanguozhi vol. 14.)
6. Yuan Shao uses his fame to attract people to serve him and boost his name. His followers are mostly people who are able to disguise their flaws through persuasion and glib talk. You are sincere towards your followers and do not recruit them for the purpose of increasing your fame. Many loyal and truly capable people are willing to serve under you. You win him in virtue. (Note: (紹因累世之資，高議揖讓以收名譽，士之好言飾外者多歸之，公以至心待人，推誠而行，不為虛美，以儉率下，與有功者無所吝，士之忠正遠見而有實者皆願為用，此德勝六也。) Fu Zi annotation in Sanguozhi vol. 14.)
7. When Yuan Shao sees others suffering from hunger and cold, he will express his concern towards them. However, he will not do so if their sufferings are not obvious. This is a form of unwise care and concern. You sometimes neglect less important things but when you handle big situations, you are connected to the masses within the Four Seas and the rewards you give out are far greater than Yuan Shao's fame. Even though this may not be obvious, your care and concern towards others are complete. You win him in benevolence. (Note: (紹見人飢寒，恤念之形於顏色，其所不見，慮或不及也，所謂婦人之仁耳，公於目前小事，時有所忽，至於大事，與四海接，恩之所加，皆過其望，雖所不見，慮之所周，無不濟也，此仁勝七也。) Fu Zi annotation in Sanguozhi vol. 14.)
8. Yuan Shao's followers are often bickering and politicking and they give libelous and troublesome advice. You govern your followers with the right principles, so corruption does not occur under your leadership. You win him in wisdom. (Note: (紹大臣爭權，讒言惑亂，公御下以道，浸潤不行，此明勝八也。) Fu Zi annotation in Sanguozhi vol. 14.)
9. Yuan Shao cannot distinguish between right and wrong. You respect someone when you think he has done right and you punish someone when you feel he has done wrong. You win him in culture. (Note: (紹是非不可知，公所是進之以禮，所不是正之以法，此文勝九也。) Fu Zi annotation in Sanguozhi vol. 14.)
10. Yuan Shao likes to display bravado and is not aware of the crucial elements in war. You overcome an enemy superior in numbers with a smaller force, just like a god of war. The soldiers look up to you, your enemies fear you. You win him in military skill." (Note: (紹好為虛勢，不知兵要，公以少克衆，用兵如神，軍人恃之，敵人畏之，此武勝十也。」) Fu Zi annotation in Sanguozhi vol. 14.)

Cao Cao laughed and said, "If what you've said is true, I feel really flattered." Guo Jia said, "Yuan Shao is now occupied in a war with Gongsun Zan in the north. We should head east to attack Lü Bu. If we don't eliminate Lü Bu first, when Yuan Shao attacks us and Lü Bu assists him, we'll be in deep trouble." Cao Cao agreed with Guo Jia. (Note: (太祖笑曰：「如卿所言，孤何德以堪之也！」嘉又曰：「紹方北擊公孫瓚，可因其遠征，東取呂布。不先取布，若紹為寇，布為之援，此深害也。」太祖曰：「然。」) Fu Zi annotation in Sanguozhi vol. 14.)

== Cao Cao's campaign against Lü Bu ==
In 198, Cao Cao launched a campaign against his rival Lü Bu in Xu Province, leading to the Battle of Xiapi. Lü Bu lost three battles and retreated to Xiapi (下邳; present-day Pizhou, Jiangsu). Cao Cao's forces besieged the city for months but they still could not conquer it because Lü Bu and his men resisted firmly. By then, Cao Cao's troops were tired and weary of battle, so Cao intended to withdraw his forces. However, Guo Jia and Xun You told Cao Cao, "Lü Bu is courageous but foolhardy. His army's morale is low because he has already lost three battles. The troops look up to their commander. If their commander shows any sign of weakness, the men will lose their fighting spirit. Lü Bu may have Chen Gong as an intelligent adviser but the latter's strategies always come late. Now, we should take advantage of this situation, when the morale of Lü Bu's forces is low and when Chen Gong has yet to think of a solution, to press on a fierce attack and we'll achieve victory." Cao Cao heeded their advice and directed the waters of the Yi (沂) and Si rivers to flood Xiapi, resulting in his triumph over Lü Bu. (Note: (征呂布，三戰破之，布退固守。時士卒疲倦，太祖欲引軍還，嘉說太祖急攻之，遂禽布。語在荀攸傳。) Sanguozhi vol. 14.) (Note: (建安三年， ... 是歲，太祖自宛征呂布，至下邳，布敗退固守，攻之不拔，連戰，士卒疲，太祖欲還。攸與郭嘉說曰：「呂布勇而無謀，今三戰皆北，其銳氣衰矣。三軍以將為主，主衰則軍無奮意。夫陳宮有智而遲，今及布氣之未復，宮謀之未定，進急攻之，布可拔也。」乃引沂、泗灌城，城潰，生禽布。) Sanguozhi vol. 10.)

The Fu Zi recorded another piece of advice Guo Jia gave to Cao Cao during the Battle of Xiapi: "In the past, Xiang Yu never lost any of the over 70 battles he fought in, but once the tide turned against him, he ended up in death and destruction. This was due to his reliance on his personal courage and his negligence towards strategy. Lü Bu has lost three consecutive battles and his army's morale is low and his defences are weakening. His might is not comparable to Xiang Yu, and he is now overwhelmed by defeat and weariness. If we take advantage of our successes to press on the attack on him, we can defeat him." Cao Cao agreed with him. (Note: (傅子曰：太祖欲引軍還，嘉曰：「昔項籍七十餘戰，未嘗敗北，一朝失勢而身死國亡者，恃勇無謀故也。今布每戰輒破，氣衰力盡，內外失守。布之威力不及項籍，而困敗過之，若乘勝攻之，此成禽也。」太祖曰：「善。」) Fu Zi annotation in Sanguozhi vol. 14.)

== Advice to Cao Cao on how to handle Liu Bei ==
According to the Wei Shu, Guo Jia advised Cao Cao on how to handle Liu Bei when Liu Bei came to join Cao Cao in 196, after Lü Bu seized control of Xu Province from Liu's general Zhang Fei. On Cao Cao's suggestion, Emperor Xian appointed Liu Bei as the Governor (牧) of Yu Province (豫州). Someone told Cao Cao, "Liu Bei has the ambition of a hero. If you don't eliminate him now, he'll become a threat to you in the future." Cao Cao asked Guo Jia for his opinion, to which Guo replied, "That's true. However, when you raised an army in the name of righteousness and pledged to help the common people eliminate tyrants, you attracted talented and capable people to serve under you based on your sincerity and integrity. Liu Bei is known to be a hero, so if you kill him when he comes to serve you, you will be viewed as someone who harms men of virtue. Other talented persons will start to doubt you and may even change their minds about serving you. If that happens, who will help you achieve your goals? Therefore, it's imperative that you carefully consider the consequences of ruining your good reputation for the sake of eliminating one man who poses a threat to you." Cao Cao laughed and said, "I understand." (Note: (魏書曰：劉備來奔，以為豫州牧。或謂太祖曰：「備有英雄志，今不早圖，後必為患。」太祖以問嘉，嘉曰：「有是。然公提劒起義兵，為百姓除暴，推誠杖信以招俊桀，猶懼其未也。今備有英雄名，以窮歸己而害之，是以害賢為名，則智士將自疑，回心擇主，公誰與定天下？夫除一人之患，以沮四海之望，安危之機，不可不察！」太祖笑曰：「君得之矣。」) Wei Shu annotation in Sanguozhi vol. 14.)

However, the Fu Zi gave a completely different account of Guo's advice to Cao Cao on how to handle Liu Bei. Guo Jia told Cao Cao, "Liu Bei has great ambitions and has won the hearts of many people. Zhang Fei and Guan Yu are formidable fighters and they have pledged to serve him with their lives. From what I observe, Liu Bei will never truly submit to anyone, and his intentions are unclear. The people in the past once said, 'If you let the enemy off today, they will become a threat to you for a long time.' You should settle (Liu Bei) soon." At the time, Cao Cao was using Emperor Xian as a figurehead to command respect and had attracted many heroes to serve under him so he did not heed Guo Jia's advice. When Cao Cao later sent Liu Bei with an army to attack Yuan Shu, Guo Jia and Cheng Yu warned Cao, "Liu Bei will rebel if you let him go!" By then, Liu Bei had already left and he really did rebel against Cao Cao as he later seized control of Xu Province from Che Zhou, the provincial governor appointed by Cao Cao. Cao Cao regretted not following Guo Jia's advice. (Note: (傅子曰：初，劉備來降，太祖以客禮待之，使為豫州牧。嘉言於太祖曰：「備有雄才而甚得衆心。張飛、關羽者，皆萬人之敵也，為之死用。嘉觀之，備終不為人下，其謀未可測也。古人有言：『一日縱敵，數世之患。』宜早為之所。」是時，太祖奉天子以號令天下，方招懷英雄以明大信，未得從嘉謀。會太祖使備要擊袁術，嘉與程昱俱駕而諫太祖曰：「放備，變作矣！」時備已去，遂舉兵以叛。太祖恨不用嘉之言。) Fu Zi annotation in Sanguozhi vol. 14.)

Pei Songzhi noted that the Wei Shu account is exactly the opposite of the Fu Zi account, but did not give his opinion on which he regarded to be the genuine one. (Note: (案魏書所云，與傅子正反也。) Pei Songzhi's annotation in Sanguozhi vol. 14.) The Chronicles of Huayang stated that following Lu Bu's defeat at Xiapi. Both Cheng Yu and Guo Jia encouraged Cao Cao to have Liu Bei killed but that Cao Cao refused fearing that such an act may hurt his reputation.

== Prediction of Sun Ce's death ==
Between 194 and 199, the warlord Sun Ce embarked on a series of conquests in Jiangdong and seized control of most of the territories in the region. Around 200, Cao Cao finally engaged Yuan Shao at the Battle of Guandu. When Sun Ce heard that Cao Cao was locked in a stalemate with Yuan Shao at Guandu, he planned to lead an army across the Yangtze River and launch a surprise attack on the imperial capital Xu (許; present-day Xuchang, Henan), which was Cao Cao's base. When Cao Cao's men received news of the impending assault, they were all shocked and frightened, but Guo Jia said, "Sun Ce had newly conquered the lands in Jiangdong and he killed many heroes whose followers were willing to die for them. Besides, Sun Ce is overly confident and is unprepared, so even though he has thousands of troops, the situation is not much different from him setting out to conquer the Central Plains all by himself. If he encounters assassins, he'll have to deal with them alone. From what I observe, he'll eventually die at the hands of a common man." Guo Jia's prediction came true as Sun Ce was assassinated by the followers of Xu Gong (a commandery administrator he killed earlier) before he could even carry out his plan. (Note: (孫策轉鬬千里，盡有江東，聞太祖與袁紹相持於官渡，將渡江北襲許。衆聞皆懼，嘉料之曰：「策新并江東，所誅皆英豪雄桀，能得人死力者也。然策輕而無備，雖有百萬之衆，無異於獨行中原也。若刺客伏起，一人之敵耳。以吾觀之，必死於匹夫之手。」策臨江未濟，果為許貢客所殺。) Sanguozhi vol. 14.)

Pei Songzhi commented that Guo Jia's accurate prediction of Sun Ce's assassination was a display of Guo's foresight, but not a good gauge of Guo's brilliance because Guo did not manage to predict which year Sun Ce would die. He felt that it was purely coincidental that Sun Ce was assassinated in the same year he was planning to attack Xu. (Note: (又本傳稱嘉料孫策輕佻，必死於匹夫之手，誠為明於見事。然自非上智，無以知其死在何年也。今正以襲許年死，此蓋事之偶合。) Pei Songzhi's annotation in Sanguozhi vol. 14.) (Note: In his Zizhi Tongjian Kaoyi, Sima Guang was also skeptical of the account of Guo Jia predicting Sun Ce's death found in Guo's biography in Sanguozhi. Like Pei Songzhi, Sima opinioned that while Guo had foresight, he could not have known that Sun would die before the attack on Xuchang. He also opinioned that people of the time widely predicted that Sun would attack Xuchang after he began stationing troops along the Yangtze, and Guo had merely predicted that Sun would not be able to initiate the attack.)

== Suggestion to Cao Cao to attack Liu Bei first before attacking Yuan Shao ==
According to the Fu Zi, before the Battle of Guandu, Cao Cao wanted to attack Liu Bei (who had rebelled and seized control of Xu Province) first before dealing with Yuan Shao. However, some of Cao Cao's advisers expressed their worries that Yuan Shao would take advantage of their absence to attack them, rendering them trapped between Yuan and Liu Bei. Cao Cao faced a dilemma so he asked Guo Jia for his opinion. Guo Jia suggested, "Yuan Shao is suspicious and he hesitates before he makes any decision, so he won't make his move fast. Liu Bei had just taken control of Xu Province so his situation isn't stable yet. He can be easily defeated if we attack him fast and hard. This is a critical opportunity, we mustn't lose it." Cao Cao agreed and immediately led an army east to attack Liu Bei and defeated the latter. After his defeat, Liu Bei fled to Hebei to join Yuan Shao. Throughout that period of time, Yuan Shao did not make any move. (Note: (傅子曰：太祖欲速征劉備，議者懼軍出，袁紹擊其後，進不得戰而退失所據。語在武紀。太祖疑，以問嘉。嘉勸太祖曰：「紹性遲而多疑，來必不速。備新起，衆心未附，急擊之必敗。此存亡之機，不可失也。」太祖曰：「善。」遂東征備。備敗奔紹，紹果不出。) Fu Zi annotation in Sanguozhi vol. 14.)

However, Pei Songzhi commented that Guo Jia was not the one who pointed out Yuan Shao's weakness and suggested to launch a swift attack on Liu Bei. Rather, according to Cao Cao's biography in the Sanguozhi, it was Cao who thought of that plan himself. (Note: (臣松之案武紀，決計征備，量紹不出，皆出自太祖。此云用嘉計，則為不同。) Pei Songzhi's annotation in Sanguozhi vol. 14.)

== Cao Cao's campaigns against Yuan Shao's sons ==
Cao Cao scored a decisive victory over Yuan Shao at the Battle of Guandu in 200. Yuan Shao died two years after his defeat and his sons Yuan Tan and Yuan Shang started fighting each other for control over their father's vast domain. Cao Cao defeated Yuan Tan and Yuan Shang at the Battle of Liyang in 202–203 and won several consecutive battles. At the time, many of Cao Cao's generals urged Cao to take advantage of his successes to continue attacking the Yuans, but Guo Jia said, "Yuan Shao loved both sons so he couldn't decide between them who would succeed him. With advisers like Guo Tu and Pang Ji to assist the Yuans, internal conflict will definitely break out between them. If we press on our attacks, the Yuans will unite to resist us. If we withdraw our forces, the Yuans will start fighting among themselves. Why don't we turn south and attack Liu Biao in Jing Province first? We should wait until the Yuan brothers start fighting each other and then attack them. We'll achieve victory in this way." Cao Cao agreed and prepared for a campaign against Liu Biao. (Note: (從破袁紹，紹死，又從討譚、尚於黎陽，連戰數克。諸將欲乘勝遂攻之，嘉曰：「袁紹愛此二子，莫適立也。有郭圖、逢紀為之謀臣，必交鬬其閒，還相離也。急之則相持，緩之而後爭心生。不如南向荊州若征劉表者，以待其一變成而後擊之，可一舉定也。」太祖曰：「善。」乃南征。) Sanguozhi vol. 14.)

Internal conflict did break out between Yuan Tan and Yuan Shang later, which resulted in Yuan Tan being defeated by his younger brother. Yuan Tan retreated to Pingyuan (平原) and sent Xin Pi to meet Cao Cao, agreeing to surrender to Cao and requesting for assistance in dealing with Yuan Shang. Cao Cao led his forces north and defeated Yuan Shang at the Battle of Ye in 204. In 205, Cao Cao attacked Yuan Tan on some pretence and defeated him at the Battle of Nanpi. By then, Cao Cao had pacified most of Ji Province in northern China. In recognition of his contributions, the Han imperial court enfeoffed Guo Jia as the Marquis of Weiyang Village (洧陽亭侯). (Note: (軍至西平，譚、尚果爭兾州。譚為尚軍所敗，走保平原，遣辛毗乞降。太祖還救之，遂從定鄴。又從攻譚於南皮，兾州平。封嘉洧陽亭侯。) Sanguozhi vol. 14.)

=== Battle of White Wolf Mountain ===
When Cao Cao was preparing for another campaign against Yuan Shang (who had fled to join his second brother Yuan Xi and the Wuhuan tribes), many of his followers were worried that Liu Biao might send Liu Bei (who had become a vassal under Liu Biao) to attack Cao Cao's base, the imperial capital Xu (許; present-day Xuchang, Henan). However, Guo Jia said to Cao Cao, "Your military might may be very well known now, but the Wuhuan will definitely not set up defences because they are deluded by a false sense of security since they are far away from you. As such, if you seize this opportunity to launch a surprise attack on them, you can eliminate them. Besides, Yuan Shao treated the ethnic minorities well and the Yuan brothers are still alive. Now, the people of northern China submit to you because they fear your military might, and you've yet to pacify them through benevolent governance. If you abandon the campaign and head south instead, the Wuhuan and Yuan Shao's former followers might rally the support of the people in northern China, who are likely to respond to their call. When that happens, the attention of Tadun (a Wuhuan chieftain) will be aroused and he may think of attacking you, and by then we would have lost Qing and Ji provinces. Liu Biao is a person who does nothing but sit and talk. He also does not trust Liu Bei as the latter is more capable than him – if he entrusts Liu Bei with important responsibilities, he will be worried that the latter will no longer submit to him; if he gives Liu Bei trivial tasks to do, the latter will be reluctant to serve him. Even if you empty your territories to campaign far away, you have no worries." Cao Cao proceeded with his campaign against the Yuan brothers and the Wuhuan. (Note: (太祖將征袁尚及三郡烏丸，諸下多懼劉表使劉備襲許以討太祖，嘉曰：「公雖威震天下，胡恃其遠，必不設備。因其無備，卒然擊之，可破滅也。且袁紹有恩於民夷，而尚兄弟生存。今四州之民，徒以威附，德施未加，舍而南征，尚因烏丸之資，招其死主之臣，胡人一動，民夷俱應，以生蹋頓之心，成覬覦之計，恐青、兾非己之有也。表，坐談客耳，自知才不足以御備，重任之則恐不能制，輕任之則備不為用，雖虛國遠征，公無憂矣。」太祖遂行。) Sanguozhi vol. 14.)

When Cao Cao's forces arrived at Yi (易), Guo Jia said, "A swift army is powerful. Now, as we've travelled a long distance, we have much heavy baggage so we cannot launch a swift attack. If the enemy learns of our approach, they will definitely prepare defences. Why don't we leave the heavy baggage behind and send our light forces to take a shortcut and launch a surprise attack?" Cao Cao led his army through a secret passage at Lulong Pass (盧龍塞) and headed directly towards the Wuhuan chieftains' headquarters. The Wuhuan were shocked when they heard of Cao Cao's approach and they hastily assembled their army, but were defeated by Cao Cao at the Battle of White Wolf Mountain. Tadun was killed in battle. The Yuan brothers fled to Liaodong to join the warlord Gongsun Kang, who captured and executed them and then sent their heads to Cao Cao. (Note: (至易，嘉言曰：「兵貴神速。今千里襲人，輜重多，難以趨利，且彼聞之，必為備；不如留輜重，輕兵兼道以出，掩其不意。」太祖乃密出盧龍塞，直指單于庭。虜卒聞太祖至，惶怖合戰。大破之，斬蹋頓及名王已下。尚及兄熈走遼東。) Sanguozhi vol. 14.)

== Death ==
Guo Jia was known for his deep foresight, which allowed him to accurately predict the outcomes of events. Cao Cao once remarked, "Only Fengxiao knows what's on my mind." (Note: (嘉深通有筭略，達於事情。太祖曰：「唯奉孝為能知孤意。」) Sanguozhi vol. 14.)

Chen Qun once made many complaints about Guo Jia, saying how Guo was very unbridled in his ways. Guo Jia, however, remained calm in the face of these accusations. Cao Cao still regarded Guo Jia highly but was also pleased that Chen Qun stood by his own principles. (Note: (初，陳羣非嘉不治行檢，數廷訴嘉，嘉意自若。太祖愈益重之，然以羣能持正，亦恱焉。) Sanguozhi vol. 14.)

Guo Jia fell ill after departing from Liucheng (柳城; in present-day Chaoyang County, Liaoning) following Cao Cao's victory at the Battle of White Wolf Mountain in 207. He was 38 years old (by East Asian age reckoning) at that time and he died not long later. Cao Cao was very grieved by Guo Jia's death. He told Xun You, "All of you are around the same age as me; only Fengxiao was the youngest. I planned to entrust him with responsibilities before my death, but it's destined that he would die at such a young age." (Note: (... 謂荀攸等曰：「諸君年皆孤輩也，唯奉孝最少。天下事竟，欲以後事屬之，而中年夭折，命也夫！」) Sanguozhi vol. 14.)

Cao Cao then wrote a memorial to Emperor Xian: "Army Libationer Guo Jia had served in the military for 11 years. There would be a discussion whenever we faced difficult situations, and when I could not decide on what to do, he was the one who helped me arrive at my decisions. He has made great contributions in the pacification of the Empire. It is unfortunate that he died early and did not manage to complete his task. We should not forget his contributions. I suggest that his family be granted an additional 800 taxable households under their control, making it a total of 1,000 households." The Wei Shu (魏書) recorded a longer memorial written by Cao Cao to Emperor Xian, requesting for Guo Jia to be honoured. (Note: (魏書載太祖表曰：「臣聞襃忠寵賢，未必當身，念功惟績，恩隆後嗣。是以楚宗孫叔，顯封厥子；岑彭旣沒，爵及支庶。故軍祭酒郭嘉，忠良淵淑，體通性達。每有大議，發言盈庭，執中處理，動無遺策。自在軍旅，十有餘年，行同騎乘，坐共幄席，東禽呂布，西取眭固，斬袁譚之首，平朔土之衆，踰越險塞，盪定烏丸，震威遼東，以梟袁尚。雖假天威，易為指麾，至於臨敵，發揚誓命，凶逆克殄，勳實由嘉。方將表顯，短命早終。上為朝廷悼惜良臣，下自毒恨喪失奇佐。宜追增嘉封，并前千戶，襃亡為存，厚往勸來也。」) Wei Shu annotation in Sanguozhi vol. 14.) Guo Jia was granted the posthumous title "Marquis Zhen" (貞侯), which literally means "chaste marquis". (Note: (乃表曰：「軍祭酒郭嘉，自從征伐，十有一年。每有大議，臨敵制變。臣策未決，嘉輙成之。平定天下，謀功為高。不幸短命，事業未終。追思嘉勳，實不可忘。可增邑八百戶，并前千戶。」謚曰貞侯。) Sanguozhi vol. 14.)

In 209, when Cao Cao was returning to Xu (許; present-day Xuchang, Henan) after his defeat at the Battle of Red Cliffs, he passed by Baqiu (巴丘), where a plague broke out in his army. He ordered the boats to be burnt, and sighed, "If Guo Fengxiao was around, I wouldn't have ended up like this." (Note: (後太祖征荊州還，於巴丘遇疾疫，燒船，歎曰：「郭奉孝在，不使孤至此。」) Sanguozhi vol. 14.) Cao Cao mourned Guo Jia again. (Note: (傅子曰：太祖又云：「哀哉奉孝！痛哉奉孝！惜哉奉孝！」) Fu Zi annotation in Sanguozhi vol. 14.) He also wrote to Xun Yu twice to lament Guo Jia's death. (Note: (傅子曰：太祖與荀彧書，追傷嘉曰：「郭奉孝年不滿四十，相與周旋十一年，阻險艱難，皆共罹之。又以其通達，見世事無所凝滯，欲以後事屬之，何意忽爾失之，悲痛傷心。今表增其子滿千戶，然何益亡者，追念之感深。且奉孝乃知孤者也；天下人相知者少，又以此痛惜。柰何柰何！」又與彧書曰：「追惜奉孝，不能去心。其人見時事兵事，過絕於人。又人多畏病，南方有疫，常言『吾往南方，則不生還』。然與共論計，云當先定荊。此為不但見計之忠厚，必欲立功分，棄命定。事人心乃爾，何得使人忘之！」) Fu Zi annotation in Sanguozhi vol. 14.)

== Family ==
Guo Jia's peerage was inherited by his son, Guo Yi (郭奕/郭弈), whose courtesy name was Boyi (伯益). (Note: (魏書稱弈通達見理。弈字伯益，見王昶家誡。) Pei Songzhi's annotation in Sanguozhi vol. 14.) Wang Chang wrote in his book Family Rules (家誡) that Guo Yi was "well-read and intelligent, but prejudiced and not generous in how he treated others; he was respectful towards people he favoured, but contemptuous towards people he disliked." Wang Chang thus hoped that his children would learn from Guo Yi's example and not be like him. (Note: (頴川郭伯益，好尚通達，敏而有知。其為人弘曠不足，輕貴有餘；得其人重之如山，不得其人忽之如草。吾以所知親之昵之，不願兒子為之。) Sanguozhi vol. 27.) (Note: In his commentary, Pei Songzhi criticized Wang for mentioning Guo Yi's shortcomings even though Guo had already died by then, and for recording said shortcomings for posterity, which is not how one should treat a friend. (Note: (至若郭伯益、刘公干，虽其人皆往，善恶有定；然既交之于昔，不宜复毁之于今，而乃形于翰墨，永传后叶，于旧交则违久要之义，于子孙则扬人前世之恶。). Pei Songzhi's commentary in Sanguozhi, vol.27)) Guo Yi served as a Literary Scholar of the Crown Prince (太子文學) in the state of Cao Wei during the Three Kingdoms period and died relatively early like his father before him. (Note: (子弈嗣。弈為太子文學，早薨。) Sanguozhi vol. 14.)

Guo Yi's son, Guo Shen (郭深), inherited his father's peerage, and was in turn succeeded by his son Guo Lie (郭獵) when he died. (Note: (子深嗣。深薨，子獵嗣。) Sanguozhi vol. 14.)

Guo Jia had another grandson, Guo Chang (郭敞), whose courtesy name was Taizhong (泰中). Guo Chang was known for his brilliance and he served as a Regular Mounted Attendant (散騎常侍) in the Cao Wei state during the Three Kingdoms period. (Note: (世語曰：嘉孫敞，字泰中，有才識，位散騎常侍。) Shiyu annotation in Sanguozhi vol. 14.)

== In Romance of the Three Kingdoms ==
Guo Jia appears as a character in the historical novel Romance of the Three Kingdoms (Sanguo Yanyi) by Luo Guanzhong, which romanticises the historical events before and during the Three Kingdoms period.

In chapter 33 of the novel, Guo Jia was accompanying Cao Cao on his campaign against the Yuan brothers (Yuan Shang and Yuan Xi) and the Wuhuan when he fell sick because he could not adjust to the climate. He advised Cao Cao to leave the heavy baggage behind and launch a swift attack on the enemy with a light force, which resulted in Cao's victory later at the Battle of White Wolf Mountain. Guo Jia remained in Yizhou (易州) to recover and did not follow Cao Cao to the frontline. When Cao Cao returned to Yizhou later, he was deeply grieved to hear that Guo Jia had already died several days ago. Before his death, Guo Jia wrote Cao Cao a note, whose contents were not revealed until later in the chapter. When Cao Cao received news that Yuan Shang and Yuan Xi had fled to Liaodong to join the warlord Gongsun Kang, his subordinates urged him to either attack Liaodong or return to Xu (許; present-day Xuchang, Henan), but Cao told them to wait until they had received the Yuan brothers' heads. Just then, Cao Cao heard that Gongsun Kang had captured and killed the Yuan brothers and sent their heads to him, and his followers were very surprised. Cao Cao then revealed Guo Jia's note, which stated: "I heard that Yuan Xi and Yuan Shang had fled to Liaodong. You should not mobilise the army. Gongsun Kang had long feared that the Yuans would conquer his territory so he would definitely feel suspicious when the Yuan brothers join him. If you attack them, they will unite to resist you and you cannot overcome them quickly; if you do not move, Gongsun Kang and the Yuans will fight each other, and this is definite."

== In popular culture ==
Guo Jia is first introduced as a playable character in the Xtreme Legends version of the seventh instalment in Koei's Dynasty Warriors video game series. He also appears in Koei's Dynasty Tactics and Romance of the Three Kingdoms series.

Guo Jia is the protagonist of the manga Ouja no Yuugi (王者の遊戯; The Game of Kings) by Iori Tabasa (緒里 たばさ).

He is portrayed by Wang Jinxin in the 2010 Chinese television series Three Kingdoms.

In the popular manhua series The Ravages of Time, Guo Jia is one the "Eight Geniuses of Water-Mirror", a select group of elite military strategist, and he is considered the strongest one amongst them.

== See also ==
- Lists of people of the Three Kingdoms
