= Tadun =

Chinese leader of the Wuhuan tribes (died 207)

- Traditional Chinese: 蹋頓
- Simplified Chinese: 蹋顿
Transcriptions
Standard Mandarin
- Hanyu Pinyin: Tàdùn

Tadun (died 207) was a leader of the Wuhuan tribes during the late Eastern Han dynasty of China. He was an ally of the warlord Yuan Shao and Yuan Shao's son and successor Yuan Shang.

== Life ==
Tadun was a younger relative of the Wuhuan chieftain Qiuliju, and was well-known for his wisdom, command skills, strength and ferocity among the Wuhuan people. After Qiuliju died sometime in the early 190s, Tadun succeeded him as the new Wuhuan leader because Qiuliju's son, Louban (樓班), was too young at the time. Tadun not only ruled over the Wuhuan tribes in Liaoxi Commandery (around present-day Lulong County, Hebei), but also those in Youbeiping (around present-day Tangshan, Hebei), Yuyang (around present-day Miyun, Beijing) and Shanggu (around present-day Yanqing, Beijing) commanderies.

Throughout the 190s, Tadun supported the warlord Yuan Shao in his power struggle against Gongsun Zan for supremacy in northern China. In return for Tadun's support, Yuan Shao awarded imperial seals and honours to Tadun and the Wuhuan chieftains in the name of Emperor Xian, the figurehead emperor of the Eastern Han dynasty. After Louban had grown up, Tadun gave the reins of power to him but continued to remain in charge of the Wuhuan tribes in Liaoxi Commandery. The other Wuhuan chieftains, such as Nanlou (難樓), Supuyan (蘇僕延) and Wuyan (烏延), pledged allegiance to Louban as their new leader.

Following Yuan Shao's death in 202, his son and successor Yuan Shang continued to maintain friendly ties with the Wuhuan. When Yuan Shang was defeated by his father's rival Cao Cao and forced to flee further north, he took shelter with Tadun and the Wuhuan tribes. Tadun attempted to help Yuan Shang regain control over the territories in northern China but to no avail. In 207, Cao Cao personally led his forces on a campaign against Yuan Shang and the Wuhuan tribes. By the time the Wuhuan realised that Cao Cao was on his way to attack them, it was too late but they still managed to muster thousands of horsemen to fight the enemy. Both sides clashed at the Battle of White Wolf Mountain near Liucheng (柳城; southwest of present-day Chaoyang, Liaoning). During the battle, Tadun was captured by the "Tiger and Leopard Cavalry" (虎豹騎) unit led by Cao Cao's cousin Cao Chun and was later executed by Zhang Liao, a general under Cao Cao.

== See also ==
- Lists of people of the Three Kingdoms
