= Cao Chun =

Chinese Han dynasty military officer (died 210)

- 曹純

Consultant (議郎) (under Cao Cao)
- In office ?–?
- Monarch: Emperor Xian of Han

Military Adviser to the Minister of Works (參司空軍事) (under Cao Cao)
- In office ?–?
- Monarch: Emperor Xian of Han

Personal details
- Born: c.170 (Note: While Cao Chun's birth year was not recorded, he was younger than Cao Ren, who was born in 168. Also, he was 20 (by East Asian reckoning) when he went to Xiangyi to recruit soldiers; this took place c.late 189, just before Cao Cao declared war on Dong Zhuo in the 12th month of the 6th year of the Zhongping era, per Cao Cao's biography in Sanguozhi; the month corresponds to 26 Dec 189 to 23 Jan 190. That year ends on 22 Feb 190 in the Julian calendar as it had a leap 12th month (24 Jan to 22 Feb 190).)
- Died: 210
- Children: Cao Yan
- Parent: Cao Chi (father)
- Relatives: Cao Ren (brother); Cao Cao (cousin)
- Occupation: Military Officer
- Courtesy name: Zihe (子和)
- Posthumous name: Marquis Wei (威侯)
- Peerage: Marquis of Gaoling Village (高陵亭侯)

Cao Chun (c.170-210), courtesy name Zihe, was a military officer serving under the warlord Cao Cao during the late Eastern Han dynasty of China. He was a younger second cousin of Cao Cao, and is best known for leading the "Tiger and Leopard Cavalry" (虎豹騎), an elite mounted unit, in several battles against Cao Cao's rivals, including Yuan Tan, Tadun and Liu Bei. His elder brother, Cao Ren, also served as a military officer under Cao Cao.

== Life ==
Cao Chun and his elder full brother, Cao Ren, were younger second cousins of Cao Cao. Their grandfather Cao Bao (曹襃) and father Cao Chi (曹熾) served in the government of the Eastern Han dynasty. Their father died when Cao Chun was 13 years old, so Cao Chun and Cao Ren lived with another family. They inherited their family fortune when they became older; they were wealthy and had hundreds of servants and retainers. Cao Chun was known for being a strict, rule-abiding and fair leader among his followers. His fellow townsfolk regarded him highly. A well-read man who respected scholars, Cao Chun was also popular among the literati, many of whom flocked to him and became his retainers.

At the age of 17, Cao Chun was called to serve in the Han government as a Gentleman of the Yellow Gate (黃門侍郎). Two years later, he followed his second cousin, Cao Cao, to Xiangyi (襄邑; present-day Sui County, Henan) (Note: At Xiangyi, Cao Cao also obtained support from a local, Wei Zi (卫玆); he was later killed at Xingyang. Wei's son Wei Zhen (卫臻) later became an official of Cao Wei, and has a biography in vol.22 of Sanguozhi.) to recruit soldiers. Since then, he had fought on Cao Cao's side in several battles against rival warlords. He became a Consultant (議郎) and Military Adviser to the Minister of Works (參司空軍事) sometime between 196 (Note: Cao Cao was appointed Minister of Works (司空) by Emperor Xian in 196.) and 205. In early 205, he led the "Tiger and Leopard Cavalry" (虎豹騎) during the Battle of Nanpi against a rival warlord, Yuan Tan. When his forces suffered heavy casualties, Cao Cao wanted to call for a retreat, but Cao Chun stopped him and said, "We've travelled a long distance to attack the enemy. While we can't defeat them at the moment by advancing, we'll definitely lose our might if we retreat. Besides, we're already deep in enemy territory and we won't be able to last long. The enemy has become complacent after their initial victory against us; we've become fearful after our initial defeat by them. We can use our fear to overcome their complacency and defeat them." Cao Cao agreed and ordered his forces to press on their attack, and eventually defeated Yuan Tan. Cao Chun's "Tiger and Leopard Cavalry" killed Yuan Tan and cut off his head during the battle.

In 207, Cao Chun led the "Tiger and Leopard Cavalry" again at the Battle of White Wolf Mountain against the Wuhuan tribes, who were allied with Cao Cao's rival Yuan Shang. During the battle, Cao Chun's unit captured Tadun, who was later executed by Zhang Liao, a general under Cao Cao. In recognition of Cao Chun's contributions in battle, Emperor Xian enfeoffed Cao Chun as the Marquis of Gaoling Village (高陵亭侯) and gave him 300 taxable households to form his marquisate.

In 208, Cao Chun accompanied Cao Cao on the campaign in Jing Province. During the Battle of Changban, Cao Chun led his troops in pursuit of the rival warlord Liu Bei and captured Liu Bei's two daughters, along with much of his equipment. They also rounded up some of Liu Bei's soldiers who were scattered during the battle and recruited them to join Cao Cao's forces. After Cao Cao occupied Jiangling County (江陵縣; present-day Jingzhou, Hubei), Jing Province's capital, Cao Chun headed back to Qiao County (譙縣; present-day Bozhou, Anhui). It is not known whether Cao Chun participated in the Battle of Red Cliffs.

Cao Chun died in 210, the 15th year of the Jian'an era in the reign of Emperor Xian. In late 220, Cao Cao's son and heir, Cao Pi, forced Emperor Xian to abdicate in his favour, ended the Eastern Han dynasty, and established the state of Cao Wei. After becoming emperor, Cao Pi awarded Cao Chun the posthumous title "Marquis Wei" (威侯).

The "Tiger and Leopard Cavalry" (虎豹騎) unit that Cao Chun led was an elite mounted unit in Cao Cao's forces. Its recruitment process was highly selective – only soldiers who had at least 100 men under them were eligible. Even Cao Cao himself found it difficult to lead such a unit, which was why he chose Cao Chun, who was able to gain the trust and respect of those elite soldiers. After Cao Chun's death, when someone asked Cao Cao to select a new candidate to replace Cao Chun, Cao Cao said, "Who is comparable to (Cao) Chun? Am I not the only person capable of leading (this unit)?" He did not choose anyone.

== Descendants ==
Cao Chun's son, Cao Yan (曹演; fl.210-254), served as a military officer in the state of Cao Wei during the Three Kingdoms period and held the position of General Who Leads the Army (領軍將軍). Sometime between 254 and 256, he was enfeoffed as the Marquis of Pingle District (平樂鄉侯). After his death, his son, Cao Liang (曹亮), inherited his marquis title.

== See also ==
- Lists of people of the Three Kingdoms
