= Caiyuan =

Caiyuan 蔡园镇
- Town
- Càiyuán Zhèn
- Location in Hebei Location in China
- Coordinates: 40°03′46″N 118°31′52″E
- Country: People's Republic of China
- Province: Hebei
- Prefecture-level city: Tangshan
- County-level city: Qian'an

Area
  - Total: 54.41 km^{2} (21.01 sq mi)

Population (2010)
  - Total: 25,885
  - Density: 475.8/km^{2} (1,232/sq mi)
- Time zone: UTC+8 (China Standard)

Caiyuan (Chinese: 蔡园镇; pinyin: Càiyuán Zhèn) is a town located in Qian'an, Tangshan, Hebei, China. According to the 2010 census, Caiyuan had a population of 25,885, including 13,160 males and 12,725 females. The population was distributed as follows: 5,154 people aged under 14, 18,736 people aged between 15 and 64, and 1,995 people aged over 65.

== See also ==
- List of township-level divisions of Hebei
