= Battle of Jieqiao =

Battle between Eastern Han warlords Yuan Shao and Gongsun Zan (191)

- Part of the wars at the end of the Han dynasty
| Date | Winter of 191 or Spring of 192 (Note: The 10th to 12th months of the 2nd year of the Chu'ping era corresponds to 5 Nov 191 to 31 Jan 192 in the Julian calendar. Vol.60 of Zizhi Tongjian recorded that the battle took place in early 192 instead. In vol.03 of Zizhi Tongjian Kaoyi, Sima Guang dated the battle to the spring (1st to 3rd months) of the 3rd year of the Chu'ping era; Emperor Xian's biography in Houhanshu also dated the battle to the same period. The period corresponds to 1 Feb to 29 Apr 192 in the Julian calendar.) |
| Location | Jieqiao (near present-day Wei County, Xingtai, Hebei, China) 36°58′51″N 115°16′29″E |
| Result | Yuan Shao victory |

Belligerents
| Yuan Shao | Gongsun Zan |

Commanders and leaders
| Yuan Shao; Qu Yi; Tian Feng | Gongsun Zan; Yan Gang †? (Note: Gongsun Zan's biography in Sanguozhi recorded that Yan Gang was captured alive. In vol.03 of Zizhi Tongjian Kaoyi, Sima Guang noted that in Jiuzhou Chunqiu, Yan Gang's name was recorded as "Liu Gang" (刘纲).) |

Strength
| Less than Gongsun Zan | 30,000 infantry, 10,000 cavalry (Note: Yuan Shao's biography in Book of the Later Han recorded that Gongsun Zan's troops were about 30000 strong, including 10000 cavalry.) |

Casualties and losses
| Unknown | Unknown but heavy, at least 1,000 |
- Location within Hebei Battle of Jieqiao (China)

Battle of Jieqiao
- Traditional Chinese: 界橋之戰
- Simplified Chinese: 界桥之战
Transcriptions
Standard Mandarin
- Hanyu Pinyin: Jièqiáo Zhi Zhàn

The Battle of Jieqiao (also known as the Battle of Jie Bridge) was fought between the Chinese warlords Yuan Shao and Gongsun Zan in late 191 or early 192 in the late Eastern Han dynasty. It was the first significant clash of arms between the rival warlords in the contest for dominion of Ji and Qing provinces in northern China. The site of the battle is generally considered to be a site east of Guangzong County, Julu Commandery (present-day Wei County, Xingtai, Hebei).

== Background ==
Late in the winter of 191, following a victorious campaign against remnants of the Yellow Turban rebels, Gongsun Zan took the pretext of his cousin Gongsun Yue's death in the Battle of Yangcheng to declare war on Yuan Shao. His army marched southwest between the Qing and Yellow rivers into Ji Province. Very quickly a number of cities under Yuan's control were compelled to change sides. Yuan Shao hurriedly made conciliatory gestures, in a bid to forestall a full blown war. He gave his official position as Grand Administrator of Bohai to Gongsun Fan, a cousin of Gongsun Zan. Gongsun Fan, however, took the Bohai garrison to join his clansman.

== Battle ==
Soon, Yuan Shao himself came in force and the two sides met 40 km south of Jie Bridge, a crossing on the Qing River. Gongsun Zan's army had a reported strength of 40,000, consisting of 30,000 infantry and 10,000 cavalry. He arrayed his infantry in a square and divided his cavalry between the left and right wings. In the centre were placed his "white horse volunteers" (白馬義從), an elite mounted unit which formed the core of his fighting force. Whilst the numbers may have exaggerated, their appearance must have been impressive; Records of Heroes describes how their "flags and armour lit up Heaven and Earth". Though Yuan Shao's army was of comparable size, it consisted almost entirely of infantry. His commander Qu Yi was placed at the vanguard with 800 crack troops and 1,000 crossbowmen. Behind them stood masses of footsoldiers, numbering in the tens of thousands, commanded by Yuan Shao himself.

Observing that Yuan's vanguard was thinly spread, Gongsun Zan ordered a charge by his cavalry. The aim was to "break the enemy line" - destroying the core of an opposing army and then rolling up its retreating multitudes. Qu Yi's men hid behind their shields and awaited the onslaught. When Gongsun's cavalry was a mere ten paces away, the crossbowmen let loose waves of bolts, followed by the foot soldiers, who rose with their spears. After a general melée, the front of Yuan Shao's line was littered with fallen horses and Gongsun Zan's dead. Gongsun's general Yan Gang (嚴綱) was killed in the fighting. Yuan Shao's army is said to have taken 1,000 heads. Having failed to breach the enemy line, Gongsun's cavalry wheeled around and streamed away from the battle, followed by the infantry.

Gongsun Zan attempted to rally and hold the line at the Qing River. His rearguard clashed with Qu Yi's men at Jie Bridge and were driven into retreat. The abandoned Gongsun camp was quickly overrun, its yak tail standard lost.

Seeing that Gongsun was all but defeated, Yuan Shao advanced with a bodyguard of several tens of crossbowmen and a hundred men-at-arms. He was caught by surprise by 2,000 horsemen who had been detached from Gongsun Zan's main force. According to the Records of Heroes, the aide-de-camp Tian Feng was about to support Yuan Shao behind a low wall for refuge. Yuan threw his helmet to the ground, and said, "A real man should die in front of the ranks. To be idle behind a wall: that is no way to live!" The enemy horsemen, ignorant of Yuan Shao's identity, were beginning to withdraw when Qu Yi arrived on the scene to drive them away. This story, somewhat detached from the main battle sequence, emphasizes Yuan Shao's bravery.

== Aftermath ==
The Battle of Jieqiao halted the southern advance of Gongsun Zan but it was by no means decisive in the protracted struggle between Gongsun and Yuan which lasted until 199. Gongsun returned a year later, in the winter of 192, along the same route. Even though the battle was a setback for Gongsun Zan, it did not significantly impact his army. Many of the soldiers who fled found their way back to Gongsun in the days and weeks after the battle.

The battle is unique in that it is described in detail in Pei Songzhi's annotations to Records of Three Kingdoms. (Note: Pei cited Wang Can's Yingxiong Ji for details of the battle. In the original Sanguozhi, Chen Shou did not mention the Battle of Jieqiao.) The arrangement of the armies and the tactics used, usually neglected by traditional Chinese histories, are reasonably clear. The battle demonstrates the ineffectiveness of even an experienced cavalry force against a disciplined infantry unit with competent leadership. It is also significant to note that although the numbers involved are very high, the actual fighting is decided by only a small elite portion of the entire army. Once the core was defeated, the demoralized masses quickly follow.
