= Qu Yi (general) =

Late 2nd century Chinese military general

- Traditional Chinese: 麴義
- Simplified Chinese: 麴义
Transcriptions
Standard Mandarin
- Hanyu Pinyin: Qū Yì

Qu Yi (fl. 190s; died 196-199) was a military general serving under the warlord Yuan Shao during the late Eastern Han dynasty of China.

== Life ==
Qu Yi was from Liang Province and was familiar with the military strategy of the Xiongnu and Qiang nomads. Qu Yi originally served under Han Fu. During this time, Yuan Shao was also expanding his influence among the Han military elites; Han Fu was deeply jealous of this and thus reduced his troops' rations. This caused Qu Yi to rebel; he then defeated the troops sent by Han Fu. It was this time that Qu Yi was recruited under Yuan Shao's wing.

In the Battle of Jieqiao, Qu Yi took the high position of controlling the central army. During this battle, Qu Yi slew Yan Gang (嚴綱) and was a great asset to Yuan Shao's army. However, this would also be his downfall. It is said that Qu Yi was arrogant and was eventually purged by Yuan Shao.

Qu Yi's last recorded campaign was in 195, where he defeated Gongsun Zan at Baoqiu, and killed at least 20000 of Gongsun Zan's troops. After this defeat, Gongsun Zan retreated to Yijing, where he fortified his position and forced Qu Yi into a stalemate lasting more than a year. By then, Qu Yi's troops had run out of supplies; a few thousands troops deserted. Gongsun Zan seized the opportunity and counter-attacked, resulting in a great victory.

== In Romance of the Three Kingdoms ==
In the 14th-century historical novel Romance of the Three Kingdoms, Qu Yi was killed in the Battle of Jieqiao by Zhao Yun during the counterattack by Gongsun Zan's army. Historically, it was unknown if Zhao Yun and Qu Yi ever met each other, as it is unknown if Zhao Yun joined Gongsun Zan before or after the Battle of Jieqiao. Qu Yi's importance in history was downplayed in the novel to enhance the importance of other characters.

== See also ==
- Lists of people of the Three Kingdoms
