= Battle of White Wolf Mountain =

Battle between warlord Cao Cao and Wuhuan tribes (207)

- Part of the wars at the end of the Han dynasty
Date	Late September or early October 207
Location	Near present-day Lingyuan, Liaoning, China
Result	Decisive Cao Cao victory; Yuan family bloodline eradicated; Wuhuan tribes scattered and weakened
Territorial changes	Northern China united under Cao Cao rule

Belligerents
Cao Cao	Wuhuan; Yuan Shang

Commanders and leaders
Cao Cao; Zhang Liao; Cao Chun	Tadun †; Yuan Shang; Yuan Xi

Battle of White Wolf Mountain
- Traditional Chinese: 白狼山之戰
- Simplified Chinese: 白狼山之战
Transcriptions
Standard Mandarin
- Hanyu Pinyin: Bólángshān zhī zhàn / Báilángshān zhī zhàn

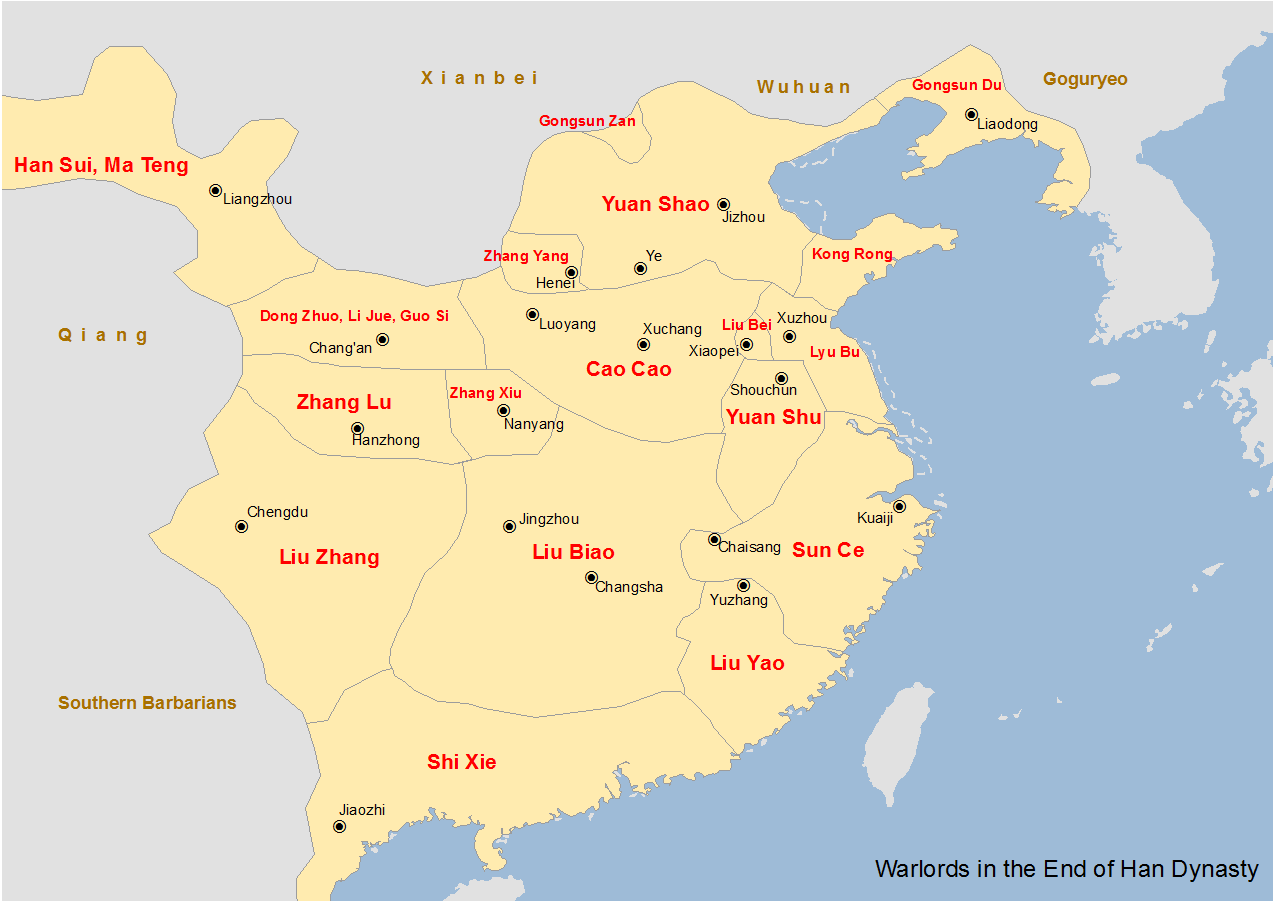
Map of the Han dynasty in 190

The Battle of White Wolf Mountain was fought in 207 in the late Eastern Han dynasty of China, preceding the Three Kingdoms period. The battle took place in northern China, beyond the frontiers of the ruling Eastern Han dynasty. It was fought between the warlord Cao Cao and the nomadic Wuhuan tribes, who were allied with Cao Cao's rivals Yuan Shang and Yuan Xi. The victory attained by Cao Cao dashed the hopes of a Wuhuan dominion, and the Wuhuan eventually became weakened, lost importance, and were gradually absorbed into the Han population or the Xianbei tribes, although they would continue to exist under different names until the 10th century AD.

== Background ==
The northern warlord Yuan Shao had maintained good relations with the Wuhuan beyond Han borders during his campaign against rival warlord Gongsun Zan, their common enemy, in the 190s. Yuan Shao gave the chieftains of his Wuhuan allies seals and insignia as chanyus after the final destruction of Gongsun Zan at the Battle of Yijing, and reinforced the alliance by marrying the daughters of his subordinates to the Wuhuan leaders, pretending as though the daughters were his own. The Wuhuan leader Tadun was especially powerful and was thus very well-treated by Yuan Shao.

The Wuhuan continued to support the Yuan clan after Yuan Shao's defeat at the Battle of Guandu against Cao Cao, shortly after which Yuan Shao died. Subsequently, Yuan Shao's oldest son Yuan Tan and youngest son Yuan Shang fought among themselves in a succession feud, which Cao Cao exploited for himself. Soon Yuan Tan was killed in a battle against Cao Cao and Yuan Shang had to flee to his second brother, Yuan Xi, in You Province. The Yuan brothers in You Province then suffered a mutiny, and fled further north to seek protection from the Wuhuan. The Wuhuan at this time had been united under the military leadership of Tadun, and his apparent strength prompted rumours that he was seeking to emulate Modu Chanyu of the Xiongnu and Tanshihuai of the Xianbei in creating a hegemony over the northern nomadic tribes. With the arrival of the Yuan brothers, accompanied by a considerable number of their followers, Tadun had gained command of a combined Wuhuan and Chinese force that was said to have numbered up to 300,000.

In the name of helping Yuan Shang regain his territories, the Wuhuan made several raids across the Chinese border. These raids were said to have kidnapped over 100,000 Chinese families. Faced with such danger in the north, Cao Cao contemplated the elimination of the Wuhuan threat.

== Plans and preparations ==
To prepare for a campaign far to the north of the Chinese heartland, Cao Cao put Dong Zhao in charge of digging two canals, the Pinglu Trench (平虜渠; "Pacify-the-Caitiffs Trench") and the Quanzhou Trench (泉州渠), from the autumn of 206 to spring of 207 so he could use these waterways to ship supplies to the north. (Note: The precise courses of these canals are not known and have been the subject of several conflicting interpretations. See de Crespigny (1984), pp. 552–555, note 100.) While these works were under way, some generals tried to dissuade Cao Cao from campaigning so far to the north in case of an attack from the south:

"Yuan Shang is an enemy in flight. The barbarians are selfish and have no feeling of affection for him, so why should they support him? If we advance deep into their territory, Liu Bei will certainly persuade Liu Biao to raid [the capital] Xu City. Should they make trouble there, you will have no chance for second thoughts."

However, Cao Cao's strategist Guo Jia urged a swift attack with the following analysis:

- The northern barbarians are deluded by a false sense of security since they are so far away from the Chinese heartlands, thus if Cao Cao takes advantage of their miscalculation and attack them quickly, they can be defeated and destroyed.
- If Cao Cao turns his military prowess to the south before settling the north, the Yuan brothers and the Wuhuan will cause trouble, and the newly settled northern provinces will be lost.
- Liu Biao, the Governor of Jing Province, will not be persuaded by Liu Bei to launch an attack on Xu City, since Liu Biao is a person who does nothing but sit and talk. Liu Biao also does not trust Liu Bei as Liu Bei is a more competent man than he is — if he gives Liu Bei an important post he must be concerned that Liu Bei will become too powerful, but if he gives him a lesser position Liu Bei will be reluctant to serve him.

Cao Cao agreed with Guo Jia's analysis, and in the summer of 207, Cao personally marched his army to Yijing (易京; present-day Yi County, Hebei) and made the city his base camp for the campaign. From there he advanced to Wuzhong (無終; present-day Ji County, Tianjin), where the local leader Tian Chou (田疇), who had been growing tired of the ongoing Wuhuan raids, submitted to him.

== The oblique approach ==
The base of Wuhuan power was located at Liucheng (柳城; southwest of present-day Chaoyang, Liaoning), and the obvious line of attack from Wuzhong was through the plains along the coastline of the Bohai Sea. However, in August or early September, the monsoon season set in and the heavy rains flooded the low-lying areas and drenched the roads in mud, making the terrain impassable. The Wuhuan also anticipated such an attack route and held the river crossings, and for some time Cao Cao's army could not advance.

Cao Cao turned to Tian Chou, who was familiar with the area and had run-ins with the Wuhuan before, for advice regarding this situation. Tian Chou notified Cao Cao of a disused road that led to the abandoned former Han frontier lands. From there the army can march through undefended territory and attack the Wuhuan where they least expect it, and by doing so "Tadun's head can be taken without a single battle", Tian Chou said. Cao Cao, most pleased, accepted the plan and first feigned a retreat by leading his army back (presumably to Wuzhong). He had his men erect signs on the roads by the water, which wrote: "It is the middle of summer, and the road is impassable. We are waiting for autumn or winter to resume the advance." Enemy scouts saw the signs and apparently believed that Cao Cao really retreated. As Tian Chou had predicted, the Wuhuan were convinced that any force that could not advance through the plains had to turn back, which was a miscalculation most grave.

Guo Jia had advised that "swiftness is the key in war" (兵貴神速; later became a Chinese idiom), and thus suggested that Cao Cao should leave the baggage trains behind and make a forced march with light troops to take the enemy by surprise, since carrying too much baggage bogs the army down and runs the risk of alerting the enemy of the army's presence. Cao Cao took the suggestion to heart. With Tian Chou leading the way, Cao Cao led a light force to embark on what has been called one of his most remarkable military adventures of his career. They climbed the hills of Xuwu (徐無; west of present-day Zunhua, Hebei), exited the Chinese frontiers through Lulong Pass (盧龍塞; presently submerged under the Panjiakou Dam) into the upper valley of the Luan River, and marched through difficult terrain for over 500 li. Turning east at Pinggang (平岡; near present-day Pingquan County, Hebei), the expedition force crossed the grazing fields of the Xianbei and re-entered the mountain ranges that served as the Eastern Han dynasty's borders. By now Cao Cao's men had flanked Tadun's defensive positions and was advancing on a line to the sea which would divide the enemy territory into two.

== The battle ==
By September or early October, as Cao Cao's army reached the valley of Daling River, Tadun and his allies realized what was happening and hastily withdrew from their prepared positions and gathered to face Cao Cao to the north. With tens of thousands of men gathered, Tadun, along with Yuan Shang, Yuan Xi, and the two Wuhuan chanyus Louban (樓班) and Wuyan (烏延), (Note: The Records of the Three Kingdoms recorded that Nengchendizhi (能臣抵之), the chanyu of Youbeiping, was among the commanders of the battle. However, the chanyu of Youbeiping at the time was actually Wuyan and Nengchendizhi was a Wuhuan chieftain of the distant Dai Commandery. The Zizhi Tongjian suggests that Wuyan and Nengchendizhi may be the same person, but it is more probable that the record is in error. See de Crespigny (2004), Jian'an 12: E, note 11.) met Cao Cao's army at White Wolf Mountain (白狼山; near present-day Lingyuan, Liaoning).

The encounter was sudden for both parties. Faced with superior numbers and the baggage left in the rear, Cao Cao's lightly armoured men became afraid. The Wuhuan, on the other hand, were evidently unprepared for battle as they were not in proper formations, nor did they attempt to take the initiative by harassing Cao Cao's march. Undaunted, Cao Cao climbed a slope to observe the enemy's formations. He saw that the Wuhuan were unordered, and immediately unleashed his soldiers to exploit this weakness. With Cao Cao's general Zhang Liao leading the offensive, the light force swiftly defeated the Wuhuan cavalry, and Cao Chun's brigade captured Tadun. Within a short time, Tadun and many of his men were killed and the battle was over. Over 200,000 Chinese settlers and Wuhuan tribesmen surrendered to Cao Cao.

== Aftermath ==
The battle was decisive — in one single engagement, Cao Cao had broken the back of Wuhuan resistance. With a few thousand horses, the Yuan brothers and the surviving Wuhuan leaders, Supuyan (蘇僕延), Louban, Wuyan and others, fled east to Liaodong (遼東; eastern Liaoning), where the warlord Gongsun Kang enjoyed some degree of independence from the Han imperial court due to Liaodong's distance from the capital and the chaotic state in China. In October or early November, Cao Cao continued his march into Liucheng, and there he halted, making no intention to attack Liaodong. Despite his subordinates urging him to press into Liaodong, Cao Cao merely replied, "I shall arrange that Gongsun Kang cuts off the heads of Yuan Shang and Yuan Xi and sends them to me. No need to bother with soldiers," he said. He later explained that applying pressure to Liaodong may bind Yuan Shang and Gongsun Kang against him, but if he left them to their devices, they would quarrel.

About a week after Cao Cao had halted his troops in Liucheng, Yuan Shang and Yuan Xi arrived in Liaodong, where Gongsun Kang had agreed to a meeting with them. Before he and Yuan Xi got to Liaodong, Yuan Shang plotted with Yuan Xi to kill Gongsun Kang while the meeting was taking place, thereby seizing control of Liaodong for the Yuans. At first, Gongsun Kang feigned hospitality and sheltered them willingly, but, as Cao Cao had predicted, he soon had Yuan Shang and Yuan Xi killed, with their heads sent back to Cao Cao in Liucheng. The Wuhuan soldiers and officers who followed the Yuan brothers met a similar fate, and their heads were delivered back to Cao Cao as well.

After this, Cao Cao returned to the North China Plain after a particularly difficult withdrawal from Liucheng, where the coldness of early winter, shortage of food, and drought all took their toll on Cao Cao's men. Guo Jia, whose advice immensely helped Cao Cao's cause, and the former warlord Zhang Xiu were among those who perished during this campaign. Upon his return, Cao Cao rewarded and complimented the counsellors who had advised against the Wuhuan campaign earlier, acknowledging that the venture had been dangerous and risky and he had been blessed by fortune. Indeed, Liu Bei had tried to persuade Liu Biao to attack while Cao Cao was away in the north. However, as Guo Jia predicted, Liu Biao did not seize the opportunity, a decision that many historians believe doomed his domain to ruling only the northern portion of Jing Province. He would later come to regret this decision.

In December 207, at the bank of the Yi River (易水), the Wuhuan leaders Nanlou (難樓) and Pufulu (普富盧), who had not joined Tadun's ill-fated resistance, came to Cao Cao and offered their homage and congratulations, formally submitting to him. The Wuhuan who had surrendered were brought into China proper en masse, and their horsemen became known as the finest cavalry force in the empire. In Cao Cao's remaining years, the Wuhuan would not pose any danger to his domain, and although there were minor revolts in 216 and 218, they were both easily put down.

With the death of Tadun and the Yuan brothers, Cao Cao's domination of northern China was now unchallenged. The success in the north brought Cao Cao tremendous prestige as he took the title of Imperial Chancellor in 208, and the secured northern frontiers allowed Cao Cao to focus his military attention against Liu Biao to the south in the same year.

On the other hand, the Battle of White Wolf Mountain scattered the Wuhuan tribes, with remnants taking refuge in Manchuria, Goguryeo, and the western borders of Liaodong. As the years went by, these remnant Wuhuan tribes were eventually absorbed by the stronger powers nearby — some were assimilated by the Chinese, but most were incorporated into the Xianbei. The Battle of White Wolf Mountain was seen as the genesis point for the Wuhuan's decline, eventually destroying both their identity and ability to remain politically independent, and despite them continuing to exist under different names until the 10th century, the Wuhuan ceased to be viewed as an independent people of the northern frontiers of China.

== In popular culture ==
The Battle of White Wolf Mountain is a playable level in both the 8th installment and the Origins reboot of Koei's Dynasty Warriors video game series.
