= Gongsun Zan =

Chinese warlord and general (died 199)

- 公孫瓚
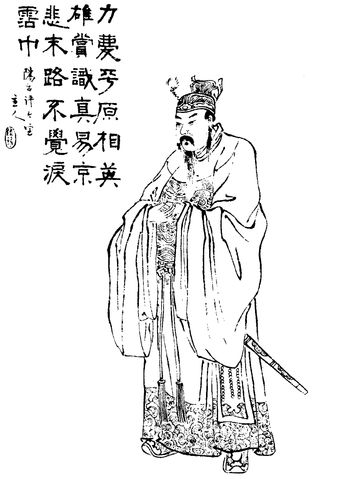
- A Qing dynasty illustration of Gongsun Zan

Inspector of You Province (幽州刺史) (self-appointed)
- In office 193 – March 199
- Monarch: Emperor Xian of Han

General of the Vanguard (前將軍)
- In office 192 – March 199
- Monarch: Emperor Xian of Han

General of Uplifting Martial Might (奮武將軍)
- In office 189–192
- Monarch: Emperor Xian of Han

Personal details
- Born: Before 161 Qian'an, Hebei
- Died: April or May 199 Yi County, Hebei
- Children: Gongsun Xu (公孫續)
- Relatives: Gongsun Yue (公孫越) (cousin); Gongsun Fan (公孫範) (cousin)
- Occupation: Military general, politician, warlord
- Courtesy name: Bogui (伯珪 or 伯圭)
- Peerage: Marquis of Yi (易侯)

Chinese name
- Traditional Chinese: 公孫瓚
- Simplified Chinese: 公孙瓒
Transcriptions
Standard Mandarin
- Hanyu Pinyin: Gōngsūn Zàn
- Wade–Giles: Kung^{1}-sun^{1} Tsan^{4}
Middle Chinese
- Middle Chinese: kuŋ-suən d͡zɑn^{X}
Old Chinese
- Zhengzhang: *kloːŋ suːn zaːnʔ

Gongsun Zan (before 161 (Note: According to Liu Bei's biography in Records of the Three Kingdoms, Gongsun Zan was older than Liu Bei, and Liu Bei treated Gongsun Zan like an elder brother. Since Liu Bei was born in 161, Gongsun Zan's birth year must be earlier.) - April or May 199 (Note: According to Liu Xie's biography in the Book of the Later Han, Yuan Shao occupied Yijing (with Gongsun Zan dying in the siege) in the 3rd month of Jian'an 4. This corresponds to 14 Apr to 12 May 199 on the Julian calendar.)), courtesy name Bogui, was a Chinese military general, politician, and warlord who lived during the late Eastern Han dynasty.

== Early life and battles with foreign tribes ==
Gongsun Zan was born in Lingzhi, Liaoxi Commandery (遼西郡), which is present-day Qian'an, Hebei. He served in the secretariat commandery. His appearance was striking and his voice imposing. Furthermore, he was a talented orator. During any discussions, he would not waste time on trivial matters and concentrate on the important with great memory and pertinence in his arguments. The local Administrator (太守), whose surname was Hou (侯), was greatly impressed and married his daughter to him. He also sent him to study under the tutelage of Lu Zhi, where he bonded with Liu Bei, one of his classmates. Since Gongsun Zan was older, Liu Bei treated him like an older brother.

He was appointed as official serving in a commandery. When his Administrator (太守), whose surname was Liu (劉), was summoned by the Minister of Justice (廷尉) for an offense. Gongsun Zan drove his chariot and supported him during the travel. When he was exiled to Rinan Commandery (日南郡) in Jiao Province, Gongsun Zan decided to accompany him and prepared rice and meat as offering to his ancestors on the northern hill. There, raising his cup, he declared: "I was a son and now a subordinate, going to Rinan. Now, the place is hard to live and I'm uncertain if I may one day return. Therefore, I pay my respect to my ancestors." He was so passionate in his demonstration that none did not cry watching him. As they were going south, Administrator Liu was pardoned.

Gongsun Zan was nominated as a xiaolian (civil service candidate) and appointed as Chief Clerk (長史) in Liaodong. During a patrol with tens of horsemen, he met hundreds of Xianbei riders. While retreating, Gongsun Zan told to his men that if they did not fight back then they would all be killed. With blade attached on both ends of his spear, he led the charge through the barbarians, killing and wounding them by dozens while losing half of his troop, managing to escape. The Xianbei fearful of him did not dare to pursue. He was promoted to Prefect (令) of Zhuo County (涿縣).

During the Guanghe era (光和; 178–184) of the reign of Emperor Ling of Han, Gongsun Zan was appointed as commander of 3 000 soldiers from You Province to quell a rebellion in Liang Province. However, in the northeast Zhang Chun (張純) started his own rebellion after securing the help of the Wuhuan leader Qiuliju. The rebels plundered Ji, killed and stole officials and civilians alike, from Youbeiping Commandery to Liaoxi Commandery, destroying everything in their path.

Gongsun Zan led his army against Zhang Chun defeating him and for his victory was promoted to Commandant of Cavalry (騎都尉). Following this the Wuhuan leader of Tanzhi (談指) surrendered alongside his tribe to Gongsun Zan. For this, he was appointed as General of the Household (中郎將) and received a marquis title.

However, Gongsun Zan made a costly error as he pursued Zhang Chun without waiting for reinforcements. Soon, Qiuliju came to Zhang Chun's aid and they forced Gongsun Zan to fall back. He fled to the town of Guanzi (管子) in Liaoxi, where Qiuliju besieged him for over 200 days. Eventually, Gongsun Zan took advantage of a snowstorm to drive through a hole in the encirclement to escape. However, he also suffered around 50 to 60% losses of his soldiers. Still, he kept command of the forces in the area and fought with the rebel tribes for five or six years. Qiuliju and other Wuhuan leaders plundered the four provinces of Qing, Xu, You and Ji. Gongsun Zan was unable to prevent them from looting and killing common people.

== Service under Liu Yu (189–191) ==
Liu Yu was known to be virtuous and kind. He served as Inspector of You Province (幽州刺史) and had good relations with the foreigners. Therefore, the Han government believed he could resolve the situation without the need of armed forces. He was appointed with greater authority as Governor of You Province (幽州牧). When he arrived, Liu Yu sent emissaries to the tribes to resolve the situation peacefully if they killed Zhang Chun. When Qiuliju and other Wuhuan leaders learned that Liu Yu was here, they wanted to surrender. However, Gongsun Zan was afraid that Liu Yu's achievement would outshine his own. Therefore, he ordered his men to kill their messengers. When the tribes learned about this, they started to meet secretly with Liu Yu. Liu Yu decided to withdraw troops from their garrisons while Gongsun Zan maintained a presence at Youbeiping Commandery of 10 000 soldiers. Zhang Chun abandoned his family and fled to the Xianbei but was killed by his subordinate Wang Zheng, who had his head sent to Liu Yu. Wang Zheng received a marquis title while Liu Yu was promoted to Grand Commandant (太尉) and enfeoffed as the Marquis of Xiangben (襄賁侯).

Emperor Xian of Han wanted to escape Dong Zhuo's influence and secretly sent Liu Yu's son, Liu He (劉和) to inform his father of his intention and assist him when he would move back east. However, Yuan Shu captured Liu He and ordered him to ask for soldiers as Yuan Shu pretended he would use them to rescue the emperor. Liu Yu sent several thousand horsemen. Gongsun Zan knew that Yuan Shu was lying and didn't want to send soldiers. However, Liu Yu refused to listen to him. As Gongsun Zan feared Yuan Shu would hold a grudge, he sent his younger cousin Gongsun Yue with a thousand horsemen while advising Yuan Shu that he should keep Liu He and Liu Yu's soldiers. From then on, Liu Yu and Gongsun Zan were no longer on good terms. Liu He later escaped but was again imprisoned by Yuan Shao.

== Conflict with Yuan Shao (191–193) ==
Gongsun Yue died at the Battle of Yangcheng and Gongsun Zan blamed Yuan Shao for his cousin's death. He raised troops and prepared for a campaign. Yuan Shao was afraid and offered his position as Administrator of Bohai to Gongsun Fan, a cousin of Gongsun Zan. However, Gongsun Fan led the troops of Bohai to join Gongsun Zan. They defeated Yellow Turban rebels present in Qing and Xu provinces. Their armies were impressive and moved toward Jie Bridge. Gongsun Zan also wrote a memorial to the imperial court, where he listed Yuan Shao's crimes. Thereafter, he led his armies and defeated Yuan Shao's forces on his way.

Gongsun Zan appointed Yan Gang as Inspector of Ji Province, Tian Kai as Inspector of Qing Province and Shan Jing as Inspector of Yan Province alongside his own officials to the commanderies and counties. While Yuan Shao led his army at Guangzong to face him. Qu Yi defeated Gongsun Zan and captured Yan Gang. Gongsun Zan then fled to Bohai and later alongside Gongsun Fan returned to Ji, where the relation with Liu Yu deteriorated.

== Against Liu Yu (193) ==
When Liu Yu tried to resolve the matters peacefully with the foreign tribes. Gongsun Zan would disagree with him, attacking them as he believed they couldn't be controlled, also, thinking that if they used gold and gifts then the foreigners would belittle the Han forces. Hence this solution could only work temporarily, and not for a long time. Therefore, Gongsun Zan prevented Liu Yu from bestowing rewards to the foreigners. Liu Yu tried to meet with Gongsun Zan but Gongsun Zan would always refuse, pretending that he was ill. After Gongsun Zan's defeat at Jieqiao. Liu Yu wanted to attack him however he was dissuaded by his official, Wei You who told him that he needed to be tolerant of Gongsun Zan's flaws as he was a man of great military and politic talents and those abilities were needed to secure the realm.

A year later, Wei You died of illness and Liu Yu alongside his officials who thought Gongsun Zan would rebel, decided to secretly attack Gongsun Zan. However, Gongsun Zan's soldiers surrounded by hostile forces managed to force their way through the city's gate to regroup, pushed on by the fear of total anhilation. Liu Yu's soldiers were also disorganized and lacked experience. Moreover, Liu Yu ordered them not to disrupt the people and prevent destruction of their houses. Gongsun Zan used this, distraught them with a fire before leading his soldiers to the attack. Liu Yu's troops were greatly defeated while he fled to Juyong. Gongsun Zan then captured him alongside the families of his subordinates, taking him back to Ji. He also killed the government officials and the people of the scholar-gentry.

Around this time, Duan Xun (段訓) was sent to grant additional honors to Liu Yu. Gongsun Zan was promoted to General of the Vanguard (前將軍) and enfeoffed as the Marquis of Yi (易侯). Gongsun Zan forced Duan Xun to justify the execution of Liu Yu under the pretense that Liu Yu wanted to proclaim himself Emperor.

Before Liu Yu's execution, Gongsun Zan had him exposed in town. Telling that if Liu Yu would become Emperor, then he would surely be saved by Heaven's rain. As it was one of the hottest day of summer, there was no rain. Therefore, Gongsun Zan killed Liu Yu. Just as he was about to be executed, many of his subordinates joined him. As they insulted Gongsun Zan for his actions, Gongsun Zan had them killed along with Liu Yu.

== Struggle in the north (193–199) ==
From then on, Gongsun Zan became arrogant and conceited with others. He had all the well educated scholars and officials sent to far away lands. When someone asked him why, he answered that the people from the gentry believe they have a right to hold office on account of their wealthy families and have no gratitude. He associated with the arrogant and bold, from the common people. Among them were the fortune teller, Liu Weitai, the silk trader, Li Yizi, the merchant Yue Hedang alongside others. These three swore brotherhood with Gongsun Zan, who acted as the eldest brother. They had immense wealth in the hundreds of millions, some married their daughters to Gongsun Zan's sons and compared themselves to the legends of the past.

Liu Yu's subordinates joined with Wuhuan leader, Yan Rou to fight against Gongsun Zan. Their forces consisted of several tens of thousands, from foreign tribes and Han soldiers. Jointly, they greatly defeated Gongsun Zan's forces led by his Administrator of Yuyang, Zou Dan (鄒丹) and killed him. Yuan Shao also cooperated his troops led by Qu Yi and Liu He with Liu Yu's subordinates to attack Gongsun Zan. Gongsun Zan's army was often defeated. Therefore, he retreated to Yijing where he prepared strong defences.

Around this time, there was a saying among the local children: "Zhang Yan advances to the south while Yuan Shao is moving to the north. In between them, it is small but the only place to find solace." Gongsun Zan believed this place was Yijing. Therefore, he built his defences there. About this, Pei Songzhi commented that as the saying was lacking rhythm, we may be missing some of his words. He believes that the original meaning was for Gongsun Zan to defend Yijing, with no further goal but since Gongsun Zan was instrumental in the destruction of the Yellow Turbans, he had too much ambition and appointed his subordinates as Inspectors of three provinces to expand against Yuan Shao. This was the reason of his failure.

Gongsun Zan's officers outside Yijing asked that he welcome them. However, he refused as he believed that if he allowed them in, they would no longer fight to the fullest. This created the opposite effect as when Yuan Shao reached Gongsun Zan's southern territories, his officers realized they could not defend themselves and would be without outside help. Therefore, they killed their superiors to surrender, while others were defeated by Yuan Shao's army. Yuan Shao easily penetrated inside Gongsun Zan's land.

Gongsun Zan built ten moats and between all of them, he constructed fortress with a tower at the center to connect them to each other in the middle, surrounded by the other fortifications. He built his own castle, where he provisioned it with his grain supplies. He would garrison his officers inside the towers and communicate with them his written orders via pulleys. Surrounded by a thousand fortifications, he would spend his time with his wives and concubines.

Gongsun Zan told his subordinates that as they no longer have the strength to resolve problems by military forces, it was better for them to rest and administer the agriculture. As they have multiple fortifications protecting them, they could defend themselves until the situation was better. Yuan Shao had his generals attack Gongsun Zan for years but they could not defeat him. Yuan Shao also wrote a long letter, where he tried to convince Gongsun Zan to amend their relations. However, Gongsun Zan gave no answer and further develop his military base. He told his advisor Guan Jing that although people are fighting everywhere, none of them can stand around his fortress for long. Therefore, Yuan Shao wouldn't be a source of worry.

In 199, Yuan Shao besieged Yijing. Gongsun Zan then sent his son, Gongsun Xu requesting help from the Heishan bandits. He also wanted to lead his cavalry out of the siege and join with them to attack Ji Province. However, his advisor Guan Jing told him that if he was to leave, the fortress would be surely be lost without his leadership to hold the defenders together. With his base lost, Gongsun Zan would have nowhere to go and would be defeated. Guan Jing further believed that Yuan Shao would retreat and from there, all the armies reunited could pursue him.

Afterwards, Gongsun Zan sent a messenger to his son, where he compared Yuan Shao's army to a ghost, constantly trying to overcome his fortifications with their towers, under the sound of drums and horns. Whether during day or night, there is no moment of peace. Zan further urged his son to reach Zhang Yan and lead fast cavalry. By the time he arrived, Zan would set a fire to the north then he would lead his soldiers out. If he failed and Gongsun Zan died then he would have the whole world to find a safe place. Gongsun Zan also had a dream of his fortress being destroyed and thought he would be defeated. He sent a letter about this to his son. However, it was intercepted. Chen Lin then sent a letter, pretending that it was written by Zan's son, to dissuade him from trying to break the siege.

One of Yuan Shao's soldiers captured the messenger and they learned about the signal. Yuan Shao's forces then used it to trick Gongsun Zan. When Gongsun Zan led his soldiers out, he was ambushed and greatly defeated but still managed to retreat back to his castle. Yuan Shao's soldiers however dug tunnels and supported by underground constructions, they overcame the towers until they reached Gongsun Zan's own central fortress. They then set fire to the tower, forcing it to fall. Knowing that he was defeated, Gongsun Zan committed suicide through self-immolation, after killing his sisters, wives and children.

== Family ==
- Gongsun Yue (公孫越), Gongsun Zan's younger second cousin. Gongsun Zan sent him with 1,000 troops and supplies to assist the warlord Yuan Shu, who was in a proxy war with his half-brother Yuan Shao. Gongsun Yue died after being hit by a stray arrow during the Battle of Yangcheng in 191 while fighting alongside Sun Jian (Yuan Shu's proxy) against Zhou Yu (Renming) (Yuan Shao's proxy). Gongsun Zan used Gongsun Yue's death as an excuse to declare war on Yuan Shao.
  - In the 14th-century historical novel Romance of the Three Kingdoms, Gongsun Yue is Gongsun Zan's younger brother. Gongsun Zan sends Gongsun Yue as a messenger to demand that Yuan Shao keep his promise by dividing Ji Province between him and Gongsun Zan after seizing it from Han Fu, but Yuan Shao refuses. While Gongsun Yue is on his return journey, Yuan Shao orders his men to pretend to be Dong Zhuo's soldiers and then ambush and kill Gongsun Yue. Gongsun Zan sees through Yuan Shao's ruse and subsequently declares war on him.
- Gongsun Fan (公孫範), Gongsun Zan's younger second cousin. He leads troops from Bohai Commandery (勃海郡) to join Gongsun Zan. He also fought in the Battle of Jieqiao alongside Gongsun Zan against Yuan Shao.
- Gongsun Xu (公孫續), Gongsun Zan's son. During the Battle of Yijing (198–199), Gongsun Zan sent him to seek reinforcements from the Heishan bandits led by Zhang Yan. They returned too late as Gongsun Zan had already been defeated by Yuan Shao and had died by suicide along with the rest of his family. Gongsun Xu later met his end at the hands of the Chuge (屠各), a Xiongnu tribe.

== White Horse Righteous Followers ==
During his battles, Gongsun Zan always rode a white horse. Whenever he had the opportunity, he would pursue the enemy and was often victorious. The foreigners warned each other about him and to avoid the "white horse". White horses were therefore feared by them. Gongsun Zan then selected thousands of white horses for his soldiers, calling them the "White Horse Righteous Followers" (白馬義從). According to another account. Among the foreign tribes, the strong soldiers were the ones to ride white horses. Gongsun Zan's army was composed of thousands of strong soldiers, most of them riding white horses therefore they were given this nickname.

== In Romance of the Three Kingdoms ==
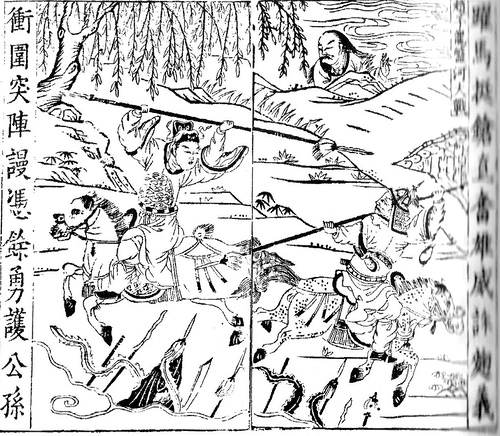
Zhao Yun displays valour in front of Gongsun Zan

Gongsun Zan is a character in the 14th-century historical novel Romance of the Three Kingdoms, which romanticises the events before and during the Three Kingdoms period of China. He leads an elite cavalry unit called the "White Riders" and has served on the northern and eastern frontiers of the Han Empire by defending the borders from incursions by various non-Han Chinese tribes. In 191, Gongsun Zan joins the coalition against Dong Zhuo, the warlord who seized power in Luoyang and holds the figurehead Emperor Xian hostage. After the coalition breaks up, he gets into a rivalry with Yuan Shao over the territories in northern China and engages him in a series of battles throughout the 190s, starting with the Battle of Jieqiao and ending with his defeat and death at the Battle of Yijing.

In the novel, Gongsun Zan is nicknamed "White Horse General" because the elite cavalry unit he leads is made up completely of horses of pure white. The reason for doing so is that he knows that the non-Han Chinese tribes consider white horses sacred animals so they will run away when they encounter an enemy unit riding white horses in battle.

== In popular culture ==
Gongsun Zan is one of the main playable characters of the video game Total War: Three Kingdoms, developed by Creative Assembly and published by Sega.

== See also ==
- Lists of people of the Three Kingdoms
