= Wuhuan =

Proto-Mongolic nomadic people of northern China

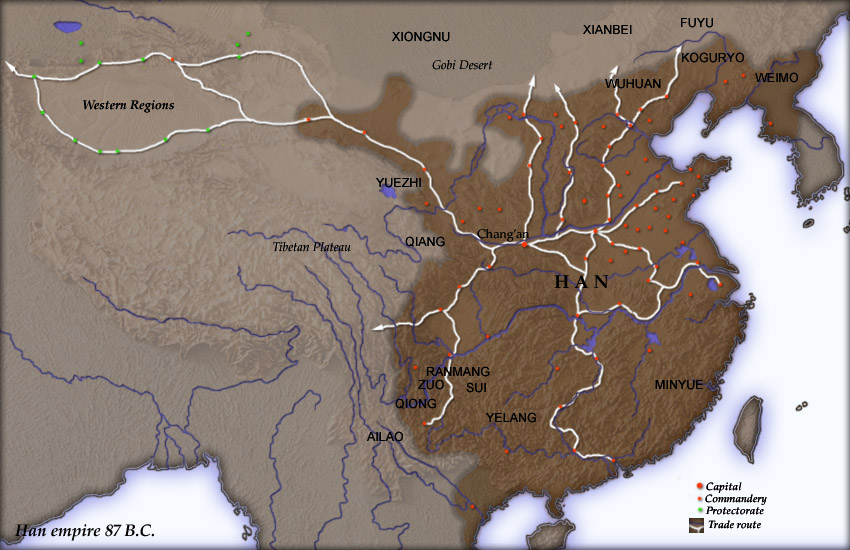
Location of the Wuhuan in 87 BC

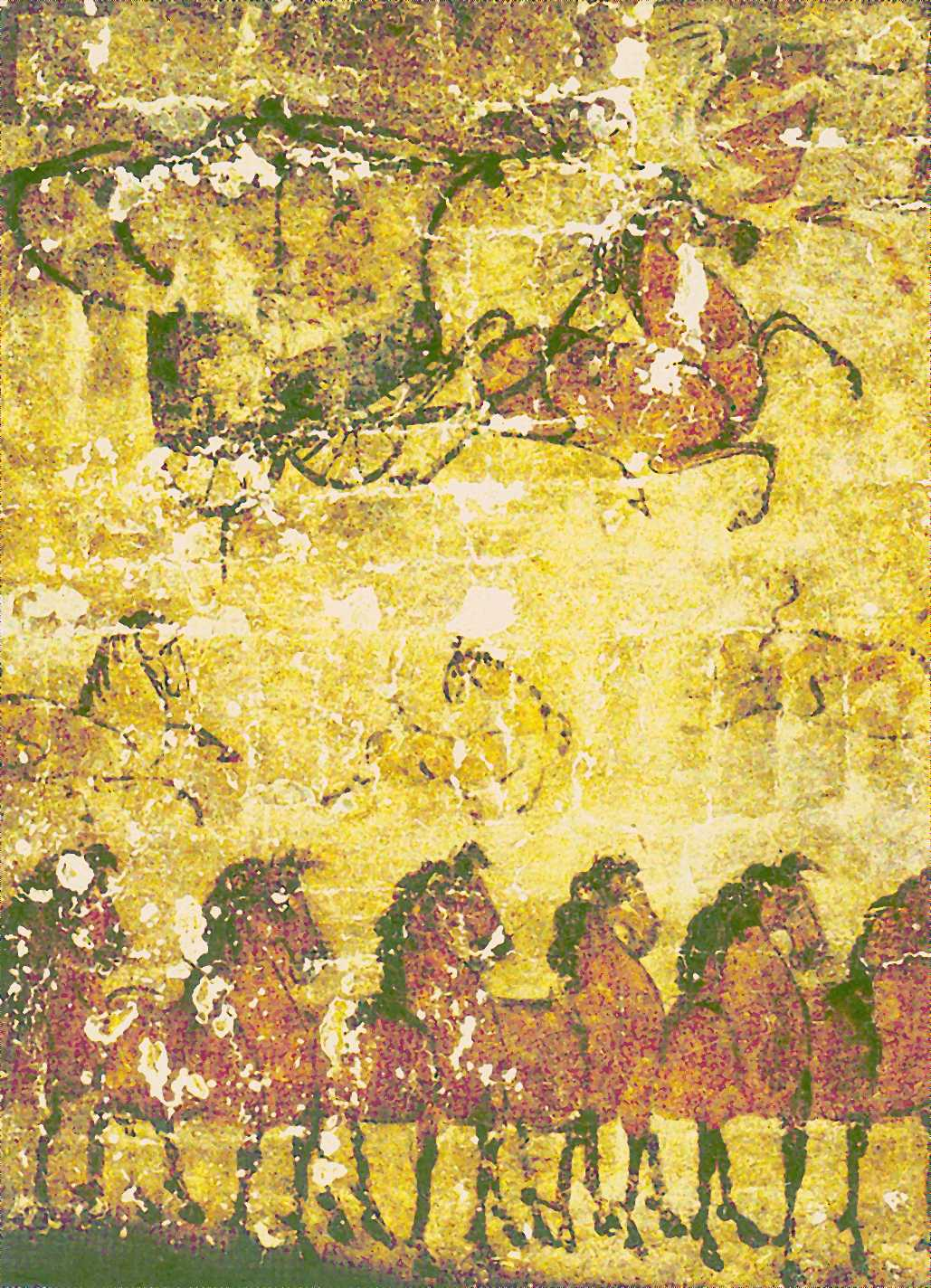
Mural depicting horses and chariots from the tomb of a Wuhuan official and military commander from the Eastern Han dynasty in Inner Mongolia.

The Wuhuan (simplified Chinese: 乌桓; traditional Chinese: 烏桓; pinyin: Wūhuán, < Eastern Han Chinese: *ʔɑ-ɣuɑn, < Old Chinese (c. 78 BC): *ʔâ-wân < *Awar) were a Proto-Mongolic or para-Mongolic nomadic people who inhabited northern China, in what is now the provinces of Hebei, Liaoning, Shanxi, the municipality of Beijing and the autonomous region of Inner Mongolia.

== History ==
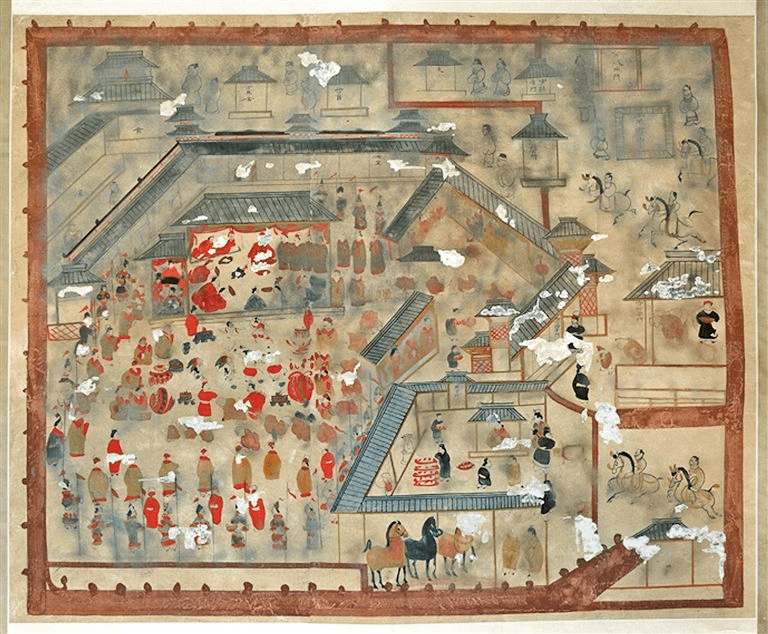
An Eastern Han (25–220) period Chinese mural of a mufu conference conducted by the Commandant-protector of the Wuhuan (护乌桓校尉) at his manor, from a Han tomb in Horinger, Inner Mongolia

After the Donghu "Eastern Barbarians" were defeated by the Xiongnu around 209 BC, they split into two groups. The northern Donghu became the Xianbei while the southern Donghu living around modern Liaoning became the Wuhuan. According to the Book of the Later Han, "the language and culture of the Xianbei are the same as the Wuhuan". Until 121 BC, the Wuhuan were a tributary of the Xiongnu empire. The Book of the Later Han says: "From the time that Modu Chanyu crushed them the Wuhuan became weak. They were kept in constant subjugation to the Xiongnu and were forced to pay annual taxes of cow, horse and sheep skins. If anybody did not pay this tax his wife and children were taken from him."

In 121 BC, the Han dynasty general Huo Qubing defeated the eastern wing of the Xiongnu. He then settled the Wuhuan in five commanderies (Shanggu, Yuyang, Youbeiping, Liaoxi and Liaodong) created on the northern Chinese border to keep watch on the Xiongnu. The chieftains of the Wuhuan paid annual visits to the Han capital Chang'an and were given rewards.

In 78 BC, the Wuhuan looted the tombs of the Xiongnu chanyus. The outraged Xiongnu rode east and defeated them. Fan Minyou was sent with 20,000 men to aid the Wuhuan. However he arrived too late as the Xiongnu were out of his reach so he attacked the Wuhuan instead, defeated them and beheaded three of their kings.

In 71 BC, the Wuhuan joined the Han, Dingling, and Wusun to defeat the Xiongnu.

In 7 AD, the Han convinced the Wuhuan to stop sending tribute to the Xiongnu, who immediately attacked and defeated the Wuhuan.

In 49, Hedan, the Wuhuan elder of the Liaoxi district, came to the Han court with 922 other chieftains and "paid tribute" to Emperor Guangwu of Han with slaves, cattle, horses, bows and tiger, leopard and sable skins.

In 58, the Xianbei chieftain Pianhe attacked and killed Xinzhiben, a Wuhuan leader causing trouble in Yuyang Commandery.

In 109, the Wuhuan joined the Xianbei in attacking Wuyuan Commandery and defeated the local Han forces.

In 168, the Wuhuan established some degree of independence under their own leaders. The largest of these groups were led by Nanlou in Shanggu, Qiuliju in Liaoxi, Supuyan in the Dependent State of Liaodong, and Wuyan in Youbeiping.

In 187 Qiuliju joined the rebellion of Zhang Chun. Following the defeat of Zhang Chun in 188, Qiuliju attacked Gongsun Zan but was defeated. In 190 he surrendered to Liu Yu and died in 193. Qiuliju's son Louban was too young to succeed him so his cousin Tadun became acting guardian. In 195 Tadun, Nanlou and Supuyan supported Yuan Shao against Gongsun Zan. In 207 Tadun was defeated by Cao Cao at the Battle of White Wolf Mountain and died in battle. Louban and Supuyan fled to Gongsun Kang, who killed them.

After their defeat, many of the Wuhuan surrendered to Cao Cao, who relocated a great number of them to the Central Plains. The Wuhuan of Youbeiping, Liaoxi and Liaodong commanderies also served as part of Cao Cao's elite cavalry forces. Meanwhile, the Wuhuan of Dai Commandery were divided into three groups. Nengchendi and the chieftains of Dai continued to cause trouble until 218 when Cao Zhang destroyed the last remnants of their power for good. In 237, the surviving Wuhuan that fled to Gongsun Kang surrendered to the Cao Wei general, Guanqiu Jian during his campaign against Kang's son, Gongsun Yuan.

The Wuhuan gradually lost their cultural identity as they integrated into the Han Chinese and the Xianbei that filled the power vacuum they left behind. They continued to appear during the Jin dynasty and Sixteen Kingdoms period in the 4th century, but by this point, the "Wuhuan" name had also become a broad term for "Hu" tribes (mainly descendants of the Southern Xiongnu) who intermixed with tribes of Donghu background (Xianbei and Wuhuan) such as the Tiefu and Dugu. Under the Dai and early Northern Wei dynasty, the term was used to refer to migrants of any ethnicity living under the ruling Tuoba clan.

The Wuhuan families of the 4th century had adopted Han Chinese surnames such as Wang, Zhang and Lü, although non-Chinese surnames like Kunuguan (庫傉官), Kezuhun (可足渾) and Xiluo (悉羅) were present as well. They served as auxiliaries for the Jin during the War of the Eight Princes and Upheaval of the Five Barbarians before becoming subjects of the Sixteen Kingdoms in the north. Many leaders of fortified settlements (wubao) were also Wuhuan, and they prominently assisted the Later Yan dynasty during their conquest of the Hebei region in the late 380s. After the Northern Wei entered the Central Plains at the turn of the 5th century, the Wuhuan in China fully assimilated into the Chinese and Xianbei.

Part of the Wuhuan also became known as the Kumo Xi, or the Tatabi, who were ultimately absorbed by the Khitans in the 10th century, bringing an end to the Wuhuan name.

== Culture ==
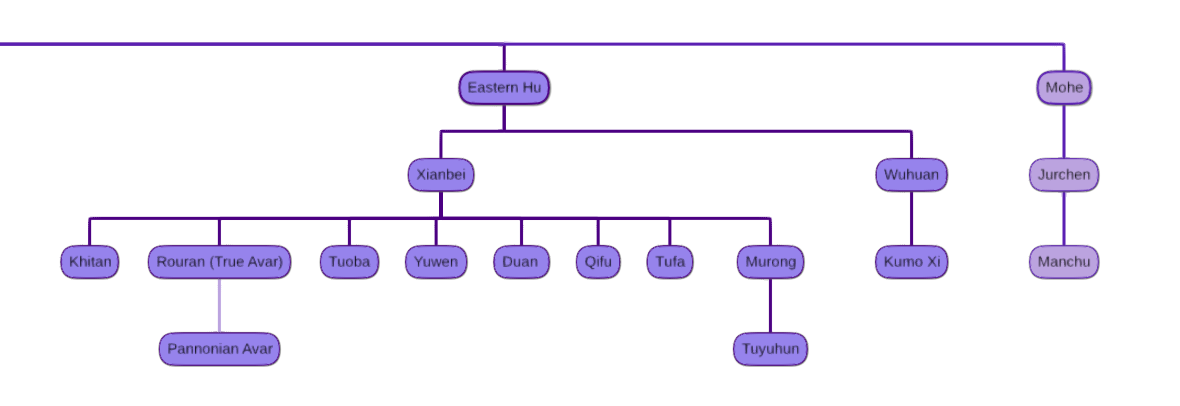
Lineage of the Wuhuan

The Book of the Later Han (Ch. 90, Treatise on the Wuhuan, Xianbei) records:

The Wuhuan are skilled in mounted archery. They engage in hunting animals and birds. They nomadise from place to place in search of grass and water. Without permanent settlements they live in round yurts (穹廬 - qiónglú). The entrance of the yurt faces the sun (south). They eat meat and drink kumiss (酪 - lào). They make clothes from fine wool (máocuì - 毛毳). Youthfulness and strength are held in esteem among them while old age and weakness are not. They are brave and valorous by nature. In anger they kill each other but nobody harms mothers, because the continuation of their progeny depends on their mothers. Fathers and elder brothers on the other hand can create their own separate tribes, so the original tribe does not bear responsibility for them. Whoever is brave, strong and able to deal with contentious cases of litigation are chosen to be elders (大人 - dàren). The office of elder is not hereditary. Each nomadic community has its own small commander (帥 - shuài). A community is composed of a hundred to a thousand yurts. When an elder makes a proclamation they carve markings on wood (刻木為信 - kèmùwéixìn), even though they have no script, and none of the tribes dare to violate it.

== Language ==
Wuhuan
- Awar
- Region: Inner Mongolia
- Ethnicity: Wuhuan
- Extinct: 3rd century CE
- Language family: Serbi–Mongolic?: Para-Mongolic?; Wuhuan

Language codes
- ISO 639-3: None (mis)
- Glottolog: None

Andrew Shimunek (2017) classifies the Wuhuan (or "Awar"/"Avar", per Shimunek's reconstruction) language as the most divergent para-Mongolic language.

== Battles ==
- Battle of White Wolf Mountain
- Battle of Nanpi

== Rulers ==
- Hedan (49 AD)
- Xinzhiben 歆志賁 (58 AD)
- Qiuliju 丘力居 (187 AD)
- Nanlou 難樓 (207 AD)
- Supuyan 穌僕延 (207 AD)
- Louban 樓班 (207 AD)
- Tadun 蹋頓 (died 207 AD)
- Nengchendi 能臣抵 (207-218 AD)
- Pufulu 普富盧 (207-218 AD)

== See also ==
- Aohans
- Beidi
- Donghu people
- Khitan people
- Xianbei

== Bibliography ==
- Barfield, Thomas (1989), The Perilous Frontier: Nomadic Empires and China, Basil Blackwell
- de Crespigny, Rafe (2007), A Biographical Dictionary of Later Han to the Three Kingdoms, Brill
- de Crespigny, Rafe (2010), Imperial Warlord, Brill
- West, Barbara A. (2009), Encyclopedia of the Peoples of Asia and Oceania, Facts on File
- Whiting, Marvin C. (2002), Imperial Chinese Military History, Writers Club Press
