= Liu Yu (warlord) =

Chinese warlord and politician

- 劉虞
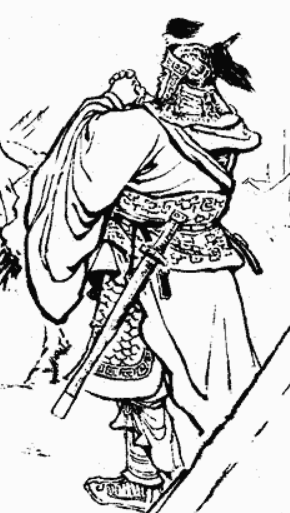

Grand Tutor (太傅) (nominal)
- In office 190 – 193
- Monarch: Emperor Xian of Han

Grand Marshal (大司馬)
- In office 189 – 190
- Monarch: Emperor Xian of Han
- Chancellor: Dong Zhuo

Grand Commandant (太尉)
- In office 189
- Monarch: Emperor Ling of Han

Inspector of You Province (幽州刺史)
- In office 188 – 189
- In office ? – before 184
- Monarch: Emperor Ling of Han

Minister of the Imperial Clan (宗正)
- In office ? – 188
- Monarch: Emperor Ling of Han

Chancellor of Ganling (甘陵相)
- In office 184 – ?
- Monarch: Emperor Ling of Han

Personal details
- Born: Unknown Tancheng County, Shandong
- Died: 193 or 194 Tianjin / Beijing
- Children: Liu He
- Parent: Liu Shu (father)
- Occupation: Military general, politician, warlord
- Courtesy name: Bo'an (伯安)
- Peerage: Marquis of Xiangben (襄賁侯)

Liu Yu (died 193 or 194), courtesy name Bo'an, was a Chinese military general, politician, and warlord who lived during the Eastern Han dynasty.

== Life ==
Liu Yu's ancestral home was in Tan County (Chinese: 郯縣), Donghai State (Chinese: 東海國), which is around present-day Tancheng County, Shandong. His ancestor was Liu Qiang (Chinese: 劉彊; 25–58 CE), a son and heir apparent of Emperor Guangwu who was deposed in 43 CE and became the Prince of Donghai (Chinese: 東海王). His grandfather Liu Jia (Chinese: 劉嘉) served as Minister of the Household (Chinese: 光祿勳), while his father Liu Shu (Chinese: 劉舒) served as the Administrator (Chinese: 太守) of Danyang Commandery (Chinese: 丹陽郡). (Note: Fan Ye cites Xie Cheng's work in vol. 73 of the Houhanshu for Liu Yu being a descendant of Liu Jiang and for the identity of Liu Yu's father. Liu Yu's own biography in Book of the Later Han only mentions that his grandfather was Liu Jia.)

Liu Yu held various appointments in the Han government during the reign of Emperor Ling (r. 168–189), including Chancellor of Ganling State (Chinese: 甘陵國相), Minister of the Imperial Clan (Chinese: 宗正), Inspector of You Province (Chinese: 幽州刺史) and Grand Commandant (Chinese: 太尉). During his tenure, he gained a strong reputation for good, incorrupt and benevolent governance. Even the ethnic minority tribes (e.g. Wuhuan, Xianbei) in You Province and foreign kingdoms near the Han Empire's northern borders (e.g. Buyeo, Yemaek) so highly respected him that they did not dare to cause trouble in his jurisdiction. In recognition of his efforts, the Han government enfeoffed him as the Marquis of Xiangben (Chinese: 襄賁侯).

In the 190s, Liu Yu and another warlord Gongsun Zan got into conflict because of opposing views on how to deal with the ethnic minority tribes and foreign kingdoms: Liu Yu adopted a peaceful and pacifist policy towards them, while Gongsun Zan preferred to use armed force to keep them under control. In 193, Liu Yu rallied an army of about 100,000 and prepared to attack Gongsun Zan. He instructed his troops to focus on eliminating Gongsun Zan and keep casualties and damage as low as possible. However, one of his subordinates, Gongsun Ji (Chinese: 公孫紀), betrayed him and told Gongsun Zan about his plan. Due to Liu Yu's approach of minimising casualties and damage, he lost the battle against the more aggressive Gongsun Zan and was forced to retreat to Juyong County (Chinese: 居庸縣). Gongsun Zan attacked Juyong County, conquered it within three days, captured Liu Yu and brought him as a prisoner to Ji County (Chinese: 薊縣; in the vicinity of present-day Tianjin and Beijing).

Around the time, the Han central government had sent an emissary, Duan Xun (Chinese: 段訓), to bestow additional honours upon Liu Yu and grant him authority to oversee affairs in the four provinces in northern China. Gongsun Zan seized the opportunity to coerce Duan Xun into transferring the titles and honours to him instead. After falsely accusing Liu Yu of plotting treason with Yuan Shao, Gongsun Zan forced Duan Xun to order Liu Yu's execution and bring Liu Yu's head back to the imperial capital Chang'an. Along the way, one of Liu Yu's former subordinates seized Liu Yu's head from Duan Xun and had it buried with the proper funeral rites. Liu Yu's execution occurred in November or December 193 (Note: The 10th month of the 4th year of the Chuping era, corresponding to 12 November to 11 December 193 in the Julian calendar.) according to the Emperor Xian's biography in the Book of the Later Han. However, his own biography in the same work states that the weather was very hot during his execution, suggesting instead that the execution occurred in the summer of 194. (Note: Equivalent to the 4th to 6th months of the 1st year of the Xingping era, corresponding to 8 May to 4 August 194 in the Julian calendar.) As Liu Yu was a highly popular and respected figure in You Province, many people mourned his death.

== Family ==
Liu Yu's son, Liu He (Chinese: 劉和), served as Palace Attendant. He was captured and held hostage by the warlord Yuan Shu but later escaped to join Yuan Shu's half-brother, the warlord Yuan Shao. With backing from Yuan Shao, he and his father's former subordinates sought revenge against Gongsun Zan.

== In Romance of the Three Kingdoms ==
In the 14th-century historical novel Romance of the Three Kingdoms, the Ten Regular Attendants took military offices for themselves. When there came two rebellions in Yuyang and Changsha, the eunuchs appointed Liu Yu to be the Imperial Protector of Youzhou, who raised armies to defeat the rebels in Yuyang. It was after his success in a partnership with Liu Bei, that he was given the title of Grand Commander.

== See also ==
- Lists of people of the Three Kingdoms
