= Lulong County =

Lulong County 卢龙县 Lulung
- County
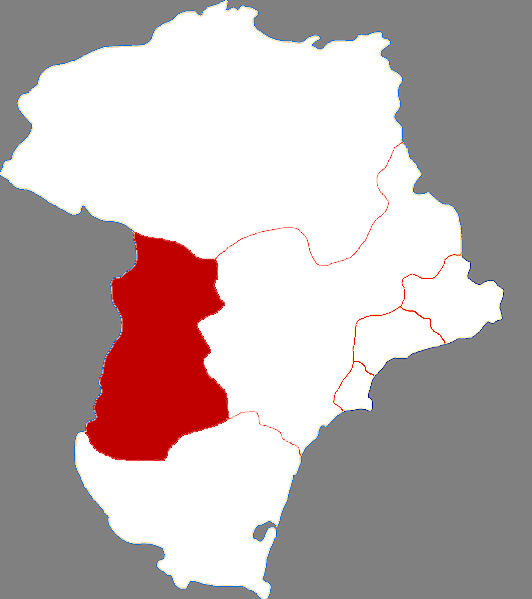
- Location in Qinhuangdao

- Location of the seat in Hebei
- Coordinates: 39°54′N 118°54′E
- Country: People's Republic of China
- Province: Hebei
- Prefecture-level city: Qinhuangdao
- County seat: Lulong Town (卢龙镇)

Area
  - Total: 961 km^{2} (371 sq mi)
- Elevation: 55 m (180 ft)

Population (2020 census)
  - Total: 333,942
  - Density: 347/km^{2} (900/sq mi)
- Time zone: UTC+8 (China Standard)
- Postal code: 066400
- Area code: 0335
- Website: www.lulong.gov.cn

Lulong County
- Traditional Chinese: 盧龍縣
- Simplified Chinese: 卢龙县
- Literal meaning: Black Dragon County
Transcriptions
Standard Mandarin
- Hanyu Pinyin: Lúlóng Xiàn
- Wade–Giles: Lu-lung Hsien

Former names
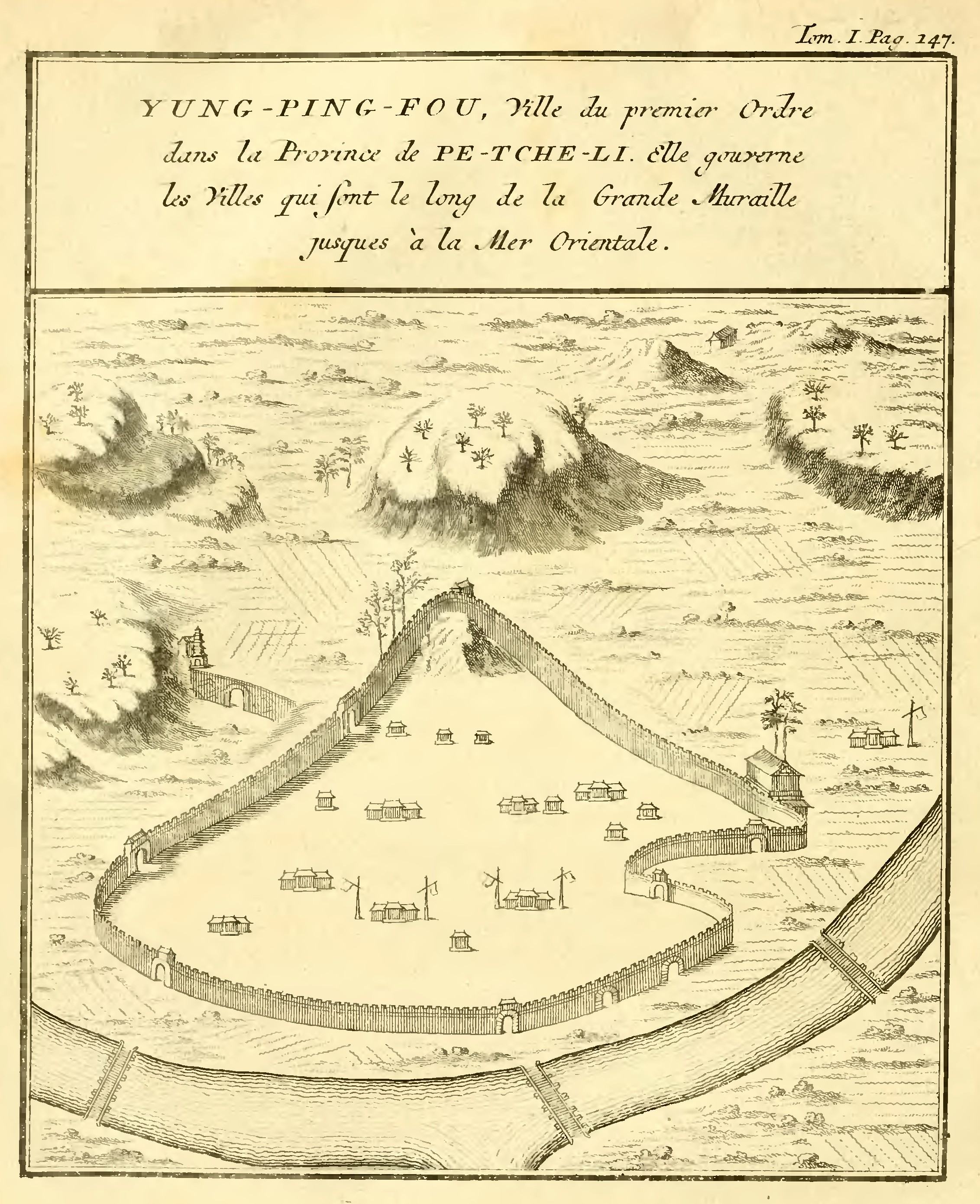
- "Yung-ping-fou" in Du Halde's 1736 Description of China, based on accounts from Jesuit missionaries

Yongping
- Chinese: 永平
- Literal meaning: Ever-Peaceful; Eternally-Pacified
Transcriptions
Standard Mandarin
- Hanyu Pinyin: Yǒngpíng
- Wade–Giles: Yung-p‘ing

Lulong County (Chinese: 卢龙; pinyin: Lúlóng), is a county of Qinhuangdao City, in northeastern Hebei Province, China. As of 2020, according to the 2020 Chinese census, the county has a population of 333,942.

Lulong County in ancient times was a strategic military location because of the geographical advantage of the area. The first settlement in what is now modern Lulong was founded in the Wei Dynasty around the year 206 AD, after the famous military strategist and general Caocao stationed troops there as he travelled north to attack Wuhan and kill Tadun, the leader of the Wuhan tribes at that time. The military settlement established by Caocao was known as Pingzhou City (平州城) and was made mostly of rammed earth. After that, the following dynasties set up passes and stationed troops there, and as the administrative center of the state, county and prefecture, it was an important core area of ancient northern China. It later became known as Yongping Prefecture (永平府), the first city east of Beijing and was later renamed to Lulong as it is known today.

Ancient Yongping Prefecture City later built a walled city during the Ming Dynasty (around 1371 under the orders of the commander Fei Yu (费愚)) with several large gates at each cardinal direction. The Eastern gate was named 迎旭门 (Yíngxù Mén) meaning "Gate That Welcomes The Rising Sun", the Western gate was named 望京门 (Wàngjīng Mén) meaning "Gate That Looks Towards The Captial", the South gate was called 德胜门 (Déshèng Mén) meaning "Gate of Virtuous Victory" and the Northern gate was called 拱辰门 (Gǒngchén Mén) meaning "Gate Facing The Northern Star". After many skirmishes and small wars, the walls of the ancient city were damaged and repaired many times; citizens of the city later re-purposed the bricks of the city walls to build dwellings and other structures, which was not uncommon during hard economic times in Ancient China (sections of the Great Wall of China have also been re-purposed over time as a useful source of building materials). The walled city was built according to the underlying topography of the landscape, which resulted in an asymmetrical placement of the fortified gates. In traditional Chinese Feng shui, the gates of cities should be directly opposite each other (i.e. North and South gates, East and West gates) but the walled city of Lulong did not follow this tradition and therefore became locally famous for this design. Today, only the Western gate, one of the smaller Southern gates and some small sections of the original wall remain. The Western gate has been extensively renovated to preserve it.

Lulong culture is typical of the wider Hebei province. Traditional folk arts include the delicate construction of translucent shadow puppets made from dried donkey skins. The puppets were dyed with mineral pigments including cinnabar (for red) and malachite (for green) and were used in traditional story telling behind a backlit screen. Some excellent examples of these crafted puppets can be seen at the Lulong Museum and include not only figures but also items of daily household furniture, horses and clothing. Local delicacies include a soup known as fěn gē zi (粉鸽子: "powdered pigeon"), a soup made of spinach and boiled mung bean crepes, as well as an egg dish called jiǎ páng xiè (假螃蟹: "fake crabs") and homestyle simple egg and tofu skins boiled in salt water （鸡蛋豆腐皮: "egg tofu skin"). Fěn gē zi or "powdered pigeon" does not actually contain any pigeon; the name is derived from a local folk legend about the Emporer Dowager Cixi and her accent in the Manchu language. Tofu is commonly eaten with a side of freshly chopped green onions. Duck heads, chicken feet, five spice quail eggs and organ meats are also common fare in Lulong.

== Administrative divisions ==
The county administers 6 towns and 6 townships.

Towns:

- Lulong (卢龙镇), Panzhuang (潘庄镇), Yanheying (燕河营镇), Shuangwang (双望镇), Liutiangezhuang (刘田各庄镇), Shimen (石门镇)

Townships:

- Xiazhai Township (下寨乡), Liujiaying Township (刘家营乡), Chenguantun Township (陈官屯乡), Yinzhuang Township (印庄乡), Gebo Township (蛤泊乡), Mujing Township (木井乡)

== Climate ==
Climate data for Lulong, elevation 65 m (213 ft), (1991–2020 normals, extremes 1981–2025)
Month	Jan	Feb	Mar	Apr	May	Jun	Jul	Aug	Sep	Oct	Nov	Dec	Year
Record high °C (°F)	11.4 (52.5)	19.1 (66.4)	28.2 (82.8)	31.6 (88.9)	36.9 (98.4)	39.5 (103.1)	39.2 (102.6)	38.0 (100.4)	35.3 (95.5)	31.5 (88.7)	21.0 (69.8)	12.6 (54.7)	39.5 (103.1)
Mean daily maximum °C (°F)	0.9 (33.6)	4.8 (40.6)	11.6 (52.9)	19.6 (67.3)	25.9 (78.6)	29.1 (84.4)	30.5 (86.9)	29.9 (85.8)	26.3 (79.3)	18.9 (66.0)	9.5 (49.1)	2.3 (36.1)	17.4 (63.4)
Daily mean °C (°F)	−4.8 (23.4)	−1.3 (29.7)	5.3 (41.5)	13.3 (55.9)	19.7 (67.5)	23.5 (74.3)	25.7 (78.3)	24.9 (76.8)	20.2 (68.4)	12.8 (55.0)	4.0 (39.2)	−2.7 (27.1)	11.7 (53.1)
Mean daily minimum °C (°F)	−9.3 (15.3)	−6.2 (20.8)	0.0 (32.0)	7.6 (45.7)	14.0 (57.2)	18.6 (65.5)	21.9 (71.4)	20.9 (69.6)	15.3 (59.5)	7.5 (45.5)	−0.5 (31.1)	−6.7 (19.9)	6.9 (44.5)
Record low °C (°F)	−21.2 (−6.2)	−19.0 (−2.2)	−10.8 (12.6)	−3.5 (25.7)	5.1 (41.2)	9.2 (48.6)	15.4 (59.7)	12.6 (54.7)	3.0 (37.4)	−4.4 (24.1)	−13.0 (8.6)	−18.6 (−1.5)	−21.2 (−6.2)
Average precipitation mm (inches)	2.6 (0.10)	4.4 (0.17)	7.9 (0.31)	22.9 (0.90)	44.3 (1.74)	84.4 (3.32)	183.5 (7.22)	155.5 (6.12)	56.3 (2.22)	30.8 (1.21)	13.4 (0.53)	3.4 (0.13)	609.4 (23.97)
Average precipitation days (≥ 0.1 mm)	1.9	2.4	3.0	5.1	6.9	9.6	12.2	10.2	6.6	4.5	3.1	2.4	67.9
Average snowy days	3.0	2.6	1.4	0.3	0	0	0	0	0	0.1	1.7	3.0	12.1
Average relative humidity (%)	50	49	46	46	52	65	77	78	69	62	57	54	59
Mean monthly sunshine hours	205.4	204.6	249.8	260.6	288.4	250.9	217.4	236.2	239.0	222.9	189.0	190.3	2,754.5
Percentage possible sunshine	68	67	67	65	65	56	48	56	65	65	64	66	63
Source: China Meteorological Administration October all-time Record

== Transport ==
- China National Highway 102
- China National Highway 205
- Beijing–Harbin Railway
- Beijing–Qinhuangdao Railway
- Datong–Qinhuangdao Railway
- G1 Beijing–Harbin Expressway

Lulong City does not have a train station. Traveling to Lulong City requires taking a train to either Qinhuangdao or the nearby Luanhe station and then taking a car or shuttle bus.

== Religion ==
Buddhism has a long history in Lulong. A “stone pagoda” (石塔) remains in the Western district of the city which is one of the oldest remaining Buddhist structures in the city.

The Yongping episcopal complex was a large Catholic church and complex built around 1898 under the eye of a Dutch bishop and missionary called Ernest François Geurts. The church was burned down in 1900 during the Boxer Rebellion which took the lives of several Catholic believers inside. The complex was rebuilt in 1905 by Bishop Geurts using his indemnity funds, until it was destroyed a second time during the Chinese Cultural Revolution. By 1947, the diocese had no priests left, and the church lands had been flattened and converted into government office buildings. On the 13th of October 2005, after repeated negotiations, the church grounds were eventually returned to the Diocese of Tangshan and the Catholic church was official registered and established in Lulong in 2006.

There is a small community of muslims in Lulong, primarily local Hui indigenous ethnic minority, and Lulong is home to a small but culturally significant mosque which was referenced in the national reference work中国清真寺综览 (Survey of Mosques in China). The mosque is located in the center of a narrow hutong and is not open to the general public.

Some citizens of Lulong also subscribe to traditional Chinese belief systems including the use of mén shén or depictions of door gods which are glued to either side of the double doors of the home to prevent ghosts from entering the home and giving the inhabitants nightmares.
