= Liaoxi Commandery =

Ancient Chinese political subdivision

Liaoxi Commandery (Chinese: 遼西郡) was a commandery in imperial China from the Warring States period to Tang dynasty. It was located in modern eastern Hebei and western Liaoning, to the west of the Liao River.

The commandery was created by the state of Yan on its northern border during the Warring States period. In Western Han dynasty, It administered 14 counties, including Qielü (且慮), Haiyang (海陽), Xin'anping (新安平), Liucheng (柳城), Lingzhi (令支), Feiru (肥如), Bincong (賓從), Jiaoli (交黎), Yangle (陽樂), Husu (狐蘇), Tuhe (徒河), Wencheng (文成), Linyu (臨渝) and Lei (絫). In 2 AD, the population was 352,325, in 72,654 households. In Eastern Han, its territory and population were both much reduced. Five counties remained, including Yangle, Haiyang, Lingzhi, Feiru and Linyu. In 140 AD, the population was 81,714, in 14,150 households. In 280 AD, the commandery had 3 counties, namely Yangle, Feiru and Haiyang, and a population of 2,800 households. It was eventually merged into Beiping Commandery during Northern Qi.

Liaoxi Commandery was reestablished in Sui dynasty, and later became an alternative name of Ying Prefecture (營州). It was conquered by the Khitans in 696, but was restored in 717. Liucheng was the only county in the commandery, and the population was 3,789, or 997 households.
