= Youbeiping Commandery =

Ancient Chinese political subdivision

Youbeiping Commandery (Chinese: 右北平郡), or Beiping Commandery (Chinese: 北平郡) was a historical commandery of China from the Warring States period to Tang dynasty. It was located in present-day Hebei and Tianjin.

Youbeiping Commandery was established by the Yan state for the defense against the Xiongnu. In the Western Han dynasty, it administered 16 counties: Pinggang (平剛), Wuzhong (無終), Shicheng (石成), Tingling (廷陵), Junmi (俊靡), Ci (薋), Xuwu (徐無), Zi (字), Tuyin (土垠), Bailang (白狼), Xiyang (夕陽), Changcheng (昌城), Licheng (驪成), Guangcheng (廣成), Juyang (聚陽) and Pingming (平明). The population in 2 AD was 320,780, in 66,689 households. In the Eastern Han dynasty, only 4 counties remained, namely Tuyin, Xuwu, Junmi and Wuzhong, while most of the others were abolished. In 140 AD, the population was 53,475, and the households numbered 9,170. In the Jin dynasty, the name was changed to Beiping. The population in 280 AD was 5,000 households. In 446 AD during the Northern Wei dynasty, the commandery was merged into Yuyang Commandery.

In the Sui and Tang dynasties, Beiping Commandery became an alternative name of Ping Prefecture (平州). It administered 3 counties, including Lulong (盧龍), Shicheng (石城) and Macheng (馬城). In 742, the population was 25,086, in 3,113 households.
