= Way of the Taiping =

Taoist movement

The Way of the Taiping, also known as the Way of the Great Peace, was a Chinese Taoist movement founded by Zhang Jue during the Eastern Han dynasty. Its adherents all around China participated in the Yellow Turban Rebellion of 184, with the rebellion being suppressed within the same year by the Eastern Han government. The religious movement was greatly reduced and died soon afterwards. The Way of the Taiping was one of the two largest movements within early Taoism, with the other being the Way of the Five Pecks of Rice. During the reign of Emperor Ling of Han, the movement was recorded to have been popular in eight Provinces: Qing Province, Xu Province, You Province, Ji Province, Jing Province, Yang Province, Yan Province, and Yu Province.。

== Origins ==
The Way of the Taiping originated in the reign of Emperor Shun of Han of the Eastern Han dynasty (126–144). A Fangshi named Gan Ji (Some later histories referred to him as Yu Ji) claimed that he received a divine book called the Taiping Qingling Shu (太平清領書) from a pond in Quyang County, and thereafter started to build elaborate temples and established rituals like the burning of incense and the reading of Taoist manuscripts. He also treated the people's (Baixing) illnesses with burnt Fulu mixed with water, which increased his fame. According to the Book of Later Han, during the reign of Emperor Shun (r. 125–144), Gong Chong (宮崇), one of Gan Ji's disciples, submitted the Taiping Qingling Shu to the emperor, but did not receive substantial attention. Gong Chong's disciple Xiang Kai tried the same, but his efforts also faltered. Later on, the book fell into the hands of Zhang Jue, who established the Way of the Taiping.

== Later Developments ==
Zhang Jue from Julu Commandery, having obtained the Taiping Qingling Shu, declared himself "Great Teacher" (大賢良師), preached to his disciples and treated people's illnesses. He quickly became popular, as he sent his eight disciples around the country, using the "Kind Way" (善道) to preach to the commoners, and within ten years had followers numbering 100,000, across eight Provinces: Qing Province, Xu Province, You Province, Ji Province, Jing Province, Yang Province, Yan Province, and Yu Province. Zhang Jue split his followers into 36 "Fang"s (directions), with the bigger Fangs having over 10,000 each, while the smaller Fangs having 7,000 people. He and his brothers gave themselves titles: Zhang Bao was the "General of Land" (地公將軍), Zhang Liang was the "General of the People" (人公將軍); and Zhang Jue was the "General of Heaven" (天公將軍). The Way of the Taiping acted like a military organisation thereafter.

== Preachings ==
Zhang Jue held a nine-section cane, and often proclaimed that people were sick and suffering because they had sinned. For them to recover, the patients must first reflect on their mistakes, and when they finally show contrition, he would make them drink the Fulu-water mixture. He praised those who recovered as having great faith, and those who did not as having not enough. The Way of the Taiping worshiped the colour yellow, and followers wore yellow clothes with yellow headbands, and they worshiped the Yellow Emperor, Laozi and Taiyi (太一), who was the greatest God in the pantheon. Taiyi is an anthropomorphism of the North Star.

== Uprising ==
Zhang Jue proposed the slogan of "The Cangtian (heaven, azure sky) has perished, behold, the Huangtian (yellow sky) shall now arise. When the year is Jiazi (184 AD), the tianxia shall know peace!" (蒼天已死，黃天當立，歲在甲子（184年），天下大吉), and theorised that of Zou Yan's cycle of five elements (Wu Xing), the Earth (Yellow) element was to replace the Han dynasty's Fire element. Zhang Jue's followers wrote the slogan in the capital and yamen walls of the provinces and prefectures, and planned for the leader of the large Fangs Ma Yuanyi to lead the tens of thousands of followers from Jing Province and Yang Province to rise up on 5 March 184 AD. Ma went around the capital and nearby cities to prepare for the rebellion, and had officials within the Palace walls as spies. But the central government caught wind of the conspiracy, and Ma was torn asunder by chariots for treason. Emperor Ling of Han ordered the arrest of Zhang Jue and his followers, and this prompted Zhang to initiate the Yellow Turban Rebellion in February, with the scale of the rebellion shocking the court. New followers flocked from all over the country to join the Way of the Taiping.

== Defeat ==
Within the same year of the uprising, Zhang Jue died from an illness, Zhang Bao was killed, and Zhang Liang fell in battle. The Yellow Turban Army still resisted in various locales for the next ten years, and many joined Cao Cao's army later on. The Way of the Taiping survived in a different form, even after the Jin dynasty, in the worship of the Taiping Di Jun(太平帝君).
