= Lady Ma of Fufeng =

Chinese Han Dynasty noblewoman (d. 189 CE)

- Died: 190
- Spouse: Huangfu Gui (皇甫规)
- Dynasty: Han Dynasty

Lady Ma of Fufeng (扶風馬氏, d. 190) was a Chinese noblewoman from the late Eastern Han dynasty. She was referred to as the wife of Huangfu Gui (皇甫规), a military general, in the Book of the Later Han, which records her biography but states that her name and provenance are unknown; however, the Tang dynasty text Shuduan (書斷) identifies her as Lady Ma of Fufeng. She was a skilled student of literature and an accomplished cursive calligrapher, widely admired as a good, beautiful, versatile, and educated woman, skilled at composition, she often helped draft documents in the cabinet of Huangfu family. She is best known for confronting Dong Zhuo, the warlord who usurped power from the Han dynasty for himself, after he tried to force her to marry him.

Lady Ma was often celebrated as an example of moral integrity, standing up to the most powerful man of the time and remaining loyal to her family and the Han dynasty even during changes in power. Her case was recorded in Book of the Later Han in volume 84, "Biographies of Exemplary Women" (卷八十四 列女傳 第七十四). She was also immortalized in the historical book History of Love (情史) written by Feng Menglong, where her biography is found in volume 1, "Love and Chastity" (情贞类).

== Background ==
Lady Ma married one of the Han's three prominent generals in Liang province, Huangfu Gui, who was the uncle of the general Huangfu Song. Huangfu Gui was from Anding. After Liang Ji was executed in 159, however, Huangfu Gui was appointed to the position of governor of Taishan. Between 158 and 167, during the last years of the reign of Emperor Huan, Huangfu Gui pacified the Qiang people in the north of China and was rewarded by appointment as Duliao General. He was stationed on the northern border for several years and won the love and respect of the Qiang people.

Huangfu Gui had remarried when his first wife died (the year was not recorded). Lady Ma was his second wife; her name and place of origin are not recorded in history. She was a talented woman who was good at writing and had extensive knowledge of literature. Due to her ability to write articles, she worked as a secretary, and her work was widely admired. In 174, Huangfu Gui died. Lady Ma was widowed at a time when the Han Dynasty was crumbling due to corruption, numerous rebellions, and the rising power of warlords.

At the outbreak of the Yellow Turban Rebellion in the summer of 184, Dong Zhuo, a warlord who later became the de facto ruler of China, was sent to take over from Lu Zhi in the attack on Zhang Jue in Julu. Although his efforts during the rebellion were initially unsuccessful, with the arrival of Lady Ma's nephew, Huangfu Song, victory was gained in the winter against the peasants. When the Liang Province Rebellion occurred and the barbarians rebelled with local gentries Han Sui and Bian Zhang, Dong was reinstated and sent to suppress the rebels. While suppressing this rebellion, Dong Zhuo had several tactical and strategic disagreements with Huangfu Song; after Huangfu managed to achieve victory despite Dong's disagreements, Dong became resentful and fearful of Huangfu.

== Struggles with Dong Zhuo ==
Due to Dong Zhuo's many conquests, he gradually gained power, eventually controlling the capital Luoyang. He took possession of the palace of the Emperor of Han and proclaimed himself chancellor, many Han loyalists turned against him, there was much protest and court intrigue. Dong Zhuo's tyranny threw the capital into chaos, so an anti-Dong Zhuo coalition emerged.

Once, because the Huangfu family had a lot of influence in the Han court, Dong Zhuo heard about Lady Ma's talents and beauty, so he wanted to marry her. Dong Zhuo was known to be cruel and usurping, including capturing women for forced marriages. Then, Dong Zhuo brought a large number of dowries and slaves to ask Lady Ma to marry him, but he did not expect that she would meet him in civilian clothes. She knelt down to make a statement, begged to be released; her words were rude and directly rejected Dong Zhuo. According to the Book of the Later Han, the dowry was 100 carriages/wagons filled with money, silk, and slaves and 20 horses

Lady Ma personally went to Dong Zhuo's mansion to confront him, and after he was rejected, Dong Zhuo and his men immediately drew their swords and threatened Lady Ma. Dong Zhuo declared that he could "bend everyone within the four seas to my will. How could I not have what I want of a woman?" Knowing her fate, Lady Ma cursed him and angrily reprimanded him, "You are a descendant of the barbarian Qiang. You have brought calamity to the whole country! My ancestors were exemplars of morality and my husband's Huangfu family excelled in civil and martial arts. He was a loyal official in the service of the Han sovereign. Were not your parents servants of the Huangfu family? How dare you violate the wife of a superior!". Dong Zhuo was enraged upon hearing this; he had a carriage brought to the courtyard and hitched Lady Ma to her by the head, ordering his men to whip her, but then she smiled and said, "Why don't you hit harder? "Let me die faster!" so she was beaten to death.

== Legacy ==
According to Biographical Dictionary of Chinese Women, Lady Ma was esteemed for her loyalty and righteousness. In one portrait she is called "The one who achieved the ultimate in propriety." Her integrity lay not so much in her loyalty to her family and the Han Dynasty, but in her courage in the face of brute force. It was exceptional and considered noteworthy for a woman to sacrifice her life for righteousness and moral integrity.

Chinese records say of her that she "put to shame those lowly and mean people who bow and scrape to despotic power." However, her unflinching courage was also a useful reminder to those who came after that she died defending the morality of the house of Han against barbarians in revolt.

== Sources ==
- de Crespigny, Rafe (2007). A biographical dictionary of Later Han to the Three Kingdoms (23–220 AD). Leiden: Brill. ISBN 978-90-04-15605-0.
- Fan, Ye (5th century). Book of the Later Han (Houhanshu).
