= Yellow Turban Army =

Late 2nd century Chinese peasant rebel force

The Yellow Turban Army, also known as the Yellow Turban Bandits, was a peasant rebel force led by the late Eastern Han dynasty mystic Zhang Jue from Julu Commandery. The Yellow Turbans launched an uprising against the central government in 184, the year of the Jiazi in the sexagenary cycle. The Yellow Turban Rebellion became one of the biggest rebellions in Chinese history, but it was mostly quelled within a year by the Eastern Han government. As result, the Chinese historiography has always placed it as the progenitor of the Three Kingdoms Era. Some Yellow Turban factions continued their insurgency for decades, however, and the last known remnants of the movement were defeated in the first decade of the 3rd century.

== Yellow Turban Army ==
The Yellow Turban Army drew its strength from commoners and others shut out of opportunity. Their uprising erupted in response to deep government corruption, crushing taxes, and a succession of famines and epidemics that many interpreted as signs that the Han dynasty had lost the Mandate of Heaven (天命). The movement followed the Way of the Great Peace (太平道), an early Taoist sect whose rallying cry—“The Azure Heaven is dead; the Yellow Heaven shall rise” (蒼天已死，黃天當立)—used the color yellow to symbolize renewal, earth, and the promise of a just new order.

Zhang Jue, along with his brothers Zhang Bao and Zhang Liang, gained immense popularity by offering healing and spiritual guidance to the suffering masses. As their followers multiplied, Zhang Jue launched what became the vast Yellow Turban Rebellion, a revolt that ultimately involved nearly a million participants. Zhang Jue died during the campaign, and his brothers were killed in battle soon after. Although imperial forces suppressed the rebellion within a year, the upheaval fatally weakened the Eastern Han dynasty and set the stage for its eventual collapse.

== Impact ==
The Rebellion may have been put down within the year, but it laid the foundations of the fall of the Eastern Han dynasty. The central government handed local officials immense authority with regards to the recruitment of soldiers, which resulted in the warlordism of the late Eastern Han dynasty and the Three Kingdoms Era, undeniably a fatal blow to the Eastern Han. The Rebellion accelerated the demise of the Eastern Han, and even after the defeat of the rebellion, small scale conflicts continued under the Yellow Turban banner along the Yellow River. This is also why the Yellow Turban Rebellion is often documented in Chinese historiography as the beginning of the Three Kingdoms Era.

== Leaders ==
- Zhang Jue, head of the Yellow Turban Army, died from illness during the Rebellion. Declared himself the "Great Teacher" (大賢良師), and "General of Heaven" (天公將軍).
- Zhang Bao, Zhang Jue's second youngest brother, died from a hail of arrows during battles between Eastern Han soldiers from Qing Province and Xu Province, with the army he led dissolving thereafter. Declared himself "General of Land" (地公將軍).
- Zhang Liang, Zhang Jue's youngest brother, a leading general of the Yellow Turban Army. Declared himself "General of the People" (人公將軍).

== Notable Individuals ==
- Ma Yuanyi (馬元義): In the early days of the Yellow Turban Rebellion, Ma led tens of thousands of the Yellow Turban Army in secret, and plotted with close officials (Zhong Chang Shi; 中常侍) of the Emperor to rise up in Ye. The plot leaked and he was pulled apart by chariots in Luoyang.
- Zhang Mancheng (張曼成): Zhang was from Nanyang, and he rose up with tens of thousands of the Yellow Turban Army, killing the Junshou (commandery governor), Chu Gong (褚貢). Two months later, he was in turn killed by the newly appointed Taishou of Nanyang, Qin Jie (秦頡).
- Zhao Hong (趙弘): After the death of Zhang Mancheng, Zhao Hong became the leader of his faction of the Yellow Turban Army. Zhao occupied and held Wancheng, but was killed in a shock attack led by Zhu Jun.
- Han Zhong (韓忠): After the death of Zhao Hong, Han Zhong led the remainder of his faction of the Yellow Turban Army, and reoccupied Wancheng, holding out against Zhu Jun. Zhu caught Han in a surprise attack and Han surrendered. Han was killed in a fit of rage by Qin Jie.
- Sun Xia (孫夏): After the death of Han Zhong, Sun Xia became the commander of Han's Yellow Turban Army remains. He led the defence of Wancheng against Zhu Jun, only to fall in battle. This faction of the Yellow Turban Army thus dispersed.
- Bo Cai (波才): Bo Cai defeated Zhu Jun in battle. A month later, the combined forces of Huangfu Song and Zhu Jun won a great victory against Bo.
- Peng Tuo (彭脫): Huangfu Song and Zhu Jun chased Peng's Yellow Turban Army in Xihua, and shattered it.
- Luo Ji (卜己): Huangfu Song and Zhu Jun then went on to engage Luo Ji's Yellow Turban Army, which was based in Dong Commandery, near present-day Puyang. Huang and Zhu caught up to Luo's Army near Cangting, north of present-day Yanggu County, Shandong, and managed to capture Luo alive, decapitating over 7,000 of his soldiers.

== Beihai Commandery Yellow Turbans ==
- Zhang Rao (張饒): Led 200,000 Yellow Turbans from Ji Province, and defeated Kong Rong in battle.
- Guan Hai (管亥): Guan besieged Kong Rong, and this led Kong to send Taishi Ci from Donglai Commandery (東萊郡) to request the then Chancellor (相) of Pingyuan State (平原國) Liu Bei for aid.

== White Wave Bandits ==
- Guo Tai (郭太): (Note: Not to be confused with the scholar with a similar-sounding name, who has a biography in vol.68 of Houhanshu. This Guo Tai's courtesy name is Linzong (林宗), and died in the spring of 169 at the age of 42 (by East Asian reckoning). Fan Ye's (author of the Houhanshu) father's name was Tai (泰); to avoid naming taboo, the Book of the Later Han used "太" to refer to Guo Linzong; Guo's biography also consistently used his courtesy name to refer to him. In his annotation to Houhanshu, Li Xian noted that Zheng Tai (courtesy name Gongye [公业], and has a biography in vol.70) received the same treatment.) Between 16 March and 13 April 188, Guo Tai led some 100,000 Yellow Turban remnants to start a rebellion in Xihe Commandery (西河郡; around present-day Fenyang, Shanxi). As they originated from Baibo Valley (白波谷; "White Wave Valley") in Xihe Commandery, they later became known as the "White Wave Bandits" (白波賊). They allied with the Xiongnu leader Yufuluo and attacked Taiyuan Commandery (太原郡; around present-day Taiyuan, Shanxi) and Hedong Commandery (河東郡; around present-day Yuncheng, Shanxi). between 27 October and 25 November 189, when the bandits attacked Hedong Commandery, the warlord Dong Zhuo sent his son-in-law Niu Fu to lead troops to attack them, but Niu Fu failed to defeat them.
- Yang Feng (楊奉): Around mid-195, Emperor Xian fled from the imperial capital Chang'an, where he had been held hostage by Dong Zhuo's followers, led by Li Jue and Guo Si, since Dong Zhuo's death in 192. He returned to the ruins of the old imperial capital Luoyang, which Dong Zhuo burnt down in 191 while forcefully relocating its residents to Chang'an. Dong Cheng (a former subordinate of Niu Fu) and Yang Feng (a former White Wave bandit) protected Emperor Xian in Luoyang when Li Jue and Guo Si tried to pursue and bring the emperor back to Chang'an. Dong Cheng and Yang Feng summoned the White Wave Bandits, led by Li Le (李樂), Han Xian, Hu Cai (胡才) and others, to come to Emperor Xian's aid.
- Han Xian (韓暹): Emperor Xian returned from Chang'an, and Xiongnu forces led by Qubei and the leader of the White Wave Bandits, Han Xian, came to his aid.
- Hu Cai (胡才): Came to Emperor Xian's aid on Dong Cheng and Yang Feng's command. Xiongnu forces led by Qubei also responded to the call and came to help Emperor Xian resist Li Jue and Guo Si's forces.
- Li Le (李樂): Came to Emperor Xian's aid on Dong Cheng and Yang Feng's command. Xiongnu forces led by Qubei also responded to the call and came to help Emperor Xian resist Li Jue and Guo Si's forces.

== Self-Declared Yellow Turbans ==
- Ma Xiang (馬相): In 188, Ma Xiang (馬相) and Zhao Zhi (趙祗) led Yellow Turban remnants to start a rebellion in Yi Province (益州; covering present-day Sichuan and Chongqing). They killed Li Sheng (李升; Prefect of Mianzhu County 緜竹縣), Zhao Bu (趙部; Administrator of Ba Commandery 巴郡) and Xi Jian (郗儉; Inspector of Yi Province and grandfather of Xi Zheng). Ma Xiang even declared himself emperor. The rebellion was suppressed by local forces led by Jia Long (賈龍), a former subordinate of Xi Jian.
- Zhao Zhi (趙祗): As above.

== See also ==
- Yellow Turban Rebellion
- Way of the Taiping
