= Zang Ba =

Late 2nd/early 3rd century Chinese general

- 臧霸

Bearer of the Golden Mace (執金吾)
- Incumbent
- Assumed office 222
- Monarch: Cao Pi

General Who Guards the East (鎮東將軍)
- In office 220 – 222
- Monarch: Cao Pi

General Who Spreads Might (揚威將軍)
- Monarch: Emperor Xian of Han
- Chancellor: Cao Cao

Inspector of Xu Province (徐州刺史)
- Monarch: Emperor Xian of Han
- Chancellor: Cao Cao

Personal details
- Born: c. 162 Fei County, Shandong
- Died: c. 230s
- Children: Zang Ai; Zang Shun
- Parent: Zang Jie (father)
- Occupation: General
- Courtesy name: Xuangao (宣高)
- Posthumous name: Marquis Wei (威侯)
- Peerage: Marquis of Liangcheng (良成侯)

Zang Ba (c. 162–230s), courtesy name Xuangao, was a military general who lived during the late Eastern Han dynasty and Three Kingdoms period of China. He served the warlord Tao Qian initially, followed by Lü Bu and finally Cao Cao and his successors, but for the most part of his career, he remained semi-autonomous over his troops and eastern China. The years of his birth and death are not recorded, but he served the state of Cao Wei in the Three Kingdoms period until the reign of the second Wei emperor, Cao Rui.

During his life he was granted autonomous power over Qing and Xu provinces. He eventually held the title of marquis of various counties within, but by the time of his death held the appointment Bearer of the Golden Mace (執金吾; i.e., police chief of the imperial capital).

== Biography ==
Zang Ba was originally from Hua County (華県), Taishan Commandery, which is around present-day Fei County, Shandong. According to the Records of the Three Kingdoms, Zang Ba's father, Zang Jie (臧戒), who served as a prison warden in Hua County, was displeased with the commandery administrator's abuse of power and stopped obeying the administrator's orders. The administrator, who was greatly angered, had Zang Jie arrested to be sent to the commandery capital. Zang Ba, although only 18 at the time, led a group of some 20 or 30 men to rescue his father. Although there were over 100 soldiers escorting Zang Jie, none of them dared to stop Zang Ba. Henceforth, the Zangs became fugitives, but Zang Ba's bravery became well known.

After the Yellow Turban Rebellion broke out in the 180s, Zang Ba entered the service of Tao Qian, the Governor of Xu Province, who appointed him as Commandant of Cavalry (qiduwei, 騎都尉). During his service under Tao Qian, Zang Ba fought against Yellow Turban Army in 185.

=== Head of the Taishan bandits ===
Later in 193, as Tao Qian was repeatedly defeated by the warlord Cao Cao, Zang Ba gathered adventurers and gangsters and established himself as the leader of the bandit groups of Mount Tai with characters like Sun Guan (孫観), Wu Dun (吳敦), Yin Li (尹禮) and Chang Xi (昌豨) within his ranks. However, they did not return to Tao Qian after the campaign and instead camped at Kaiyang County (開陽) in the north of Langya Commandery. It was around this time that Zang Ba gained the nickname "Outlaw Slave" (奴寇).

When Lü Bu gained control of Xu Province, Zang Ba and his Taishan Bandits attacked Xiao Jian (蕭建) at Ju County and seized his treasury. Lü Bu found issue with this act—according to the Yingxiong ji, he was seeking an alliance with Xiao Jian; the Hou Hanshu says he expected Zang Ba to turn over the spoils—and personally led his troops to confront Zang Ba, despite opposition from his subordinate Gao Shun. Zang Ba heard of Lü Bu's violent and plundering ways, so he remained inside Ju County and put up a firm defence against Lü Bu. Lü Bu was unable to conquer Ju County and returned to Xiapi. Zang Ba later made peace with Lü Bu.

Later in 198, Zang Ba supported Lü Bu with his bandits when the latter was attacked by Cao Cao. However, after Lü Bu's defeat and execution following the Battle of Xiapi, Zang Ba lost his ally and became a fugitive.

=== Service under Cao Cao ===
After Zang Ba was captured, Cao Cao asked for his allegiance and made him the chancellor of Langya, while Zang Ba's old friends were also appointed as local administrators. Together, they held sway over the Qing and Xu provinces. Once, Cao Cao ordered Liu Bei (then his subordinate) to ask Zang Ba for the heads of Mao Jun (毛暉) and Xu Xi (徐翕), men who rebelled against Cao Cao and sought refuge with Zang Ba during the war with Lü Bu. However, Zang Ba refused to turn the two men over as he told Liu Bei that the reason he had been able to earn the loyalty of so many people was because he never turned his back on them and further remarking that it would befit a great leader to act magnanimously. Liu Bei relayed Zang Ba's response back to Cao Cao, who praised Zang Ba for his honourable conduct, comparing it to that of ancient heroes, and pardoned the two renegade, making them commandery administrators. As the rest of eastern China plunged into turmoil, the situation in the lands under Zang Ba's influence remained under control.

During Cao Cao's battles with Yuan Shao in the early 200s, Zang Ba led elite soldiers into Qing Province, allowing Cao Cao to focus the majority of his soldiers on the main battles at hand, and not having to worry about being flanked from the east. Yuan Shao's forces cannot advance to the east due to the strong defense mounted by Zang Ba. After defeating Yuan Shao at the Battle of Guandu in 200, Cao Cao defeated and killed his son Yuan Tan in the Battle of Nanpi. Zang Ba went personally to Cao Cao to congratulate him on his great victory. During the celebration banquet, he offered to move his family to Ye city, Cao Cao's headquarters, effectively as hostages to bound his loyalty. Cao Cao refused, expressing his full confidence in Zang Ba. For his accomplishments in restoring order in the east, Zang Ba was enfeoffed as a marquis of a chief village by and named as general.

In 206, Zang Ba put down the rebellion of Chang Xi, his former subordinate, together with Yu Jin. Some time between 206 and 209, he joined Xiahou Yuan and Lü Qian (呂虔) in the quelling of Yellow Turban remnants led by Xu He (徐和) and Sima Ju (司馬俱). After several engagements and heavy casualties on both sides, the two Yellow Turban rebels were killed. (Note: It is not known exactly when Xu He and Sima Ju were defeated and killed. Xiahou Yuan's biography in the Sanguozhi mentioned them between the time Yu Jin quelled a rebellion by Chang Xi (in 206) and 209 (14th year of the Jian'an era).) Zang Ba was then formally appointed as the Inspector of Xu Province, and his close comrade Sun Guan became the Inspector of Qing Province.

==== Campaigns against Sun Quan ====
After the Battle of Red Cliffs stopped Cao Cao's southern expansion in 208, Zang Ba led a contingent to join Cao Cao's army as he advanced across the Huai River to attack the southern warlord Sun Quan north of the Yangtze River. Zang Ba was the leader in the capture of Juchao (居巢) of Lujiang Commandery (盧江郡).

Later, Cao Cao sent two separate forces to suppress Chen Lan (陳蘭) and Mei Cheng (梅成), who rebelled in Lu County (六縣; in present-day Lu'an, Anhui). Yu Jin and Zang Ba were sent to attack Mei Cheng; Zhang Liao, with Zhang He and Niu Gai (牛蓋) as his deputies, were to attack Chen Lan. Mei Cheng pretended to surrender to Yu Jin and then led his men to join Chen Lan at Mount Tianzhu as soon as Yu Jin and Zang Ba left. On the other hand, Zhang Liao was worried that Sun Quan would send his general, Han Dang, with an army to assist Chen in resisting Cao Cao's forces. Han Dang was in charge of defending Huancheng, a major stronghold in Lujiang Commandery at that time, so Zhang Liao sent Zang Ba to ensure that Han Dang could not move to reinforce the rebels. Zang Ba attacked Huancheng, but Han Dang defended the stronghold well and repelled the attack, driving Zang Ba to take refuge in the city of She, north of Juchao. With Zang Ba withdrawing, Sun Quan dispatched some 20,000 to 30,000 soldiers in two separate forces to assist Chen Lan. They avoided engaging Zang Ba, but Zang Ba emerged out of his defences in a forced night march and caught Sun Quan's forces by surprise in the morning. Many soldiers of Sun Quan could not board their ships and were forced into the water and drowned. Without the intervention from Sun Quan, Zhang Liao killed both Chen Lan and Mei Cheng, quelling the rebellion.

Later, during the Battle of Ruxu in 216 and 217, Zhang Liao and Zang Ba both led the vanguard in a campaign against Sun Quan. However, their progress was hampered by continuous rainfall which had raised the water level, that allowed Sun Quan's ships to approach. With the soldiers uneasy at the situation, Zhang Liao wanted to retreat, but Zang Ba told him to wait, as he replied to Zhang Liao that "Cao Cao is wise, and (he) will not simply abandon us." The next day, an official order to retreat indeed arrived, and both generals safely returned to safety. Zhang Liao told Cao Cao of what happened, and Cao Cao was greatly impressed. Thereafter, Zang Ba moved to Juchao with Xiahou Dun to maintain pressure on Sun Quan's forces. This and other garrisons in the area pressured Sun Quan to offer Cao Cao a nominal form of submission, and the garrisons were withdrawn in 219 when Sun Quan relieved Cao Cao's forces in the Siege of Fancheng by killing Liu Bei's general Guan Yu.

=== During Cao Pi's reign ===
When Cao Cao was seriously ill in early 220, Zang Ba sent a detachment to Luoyang to observe the situation. Upon learning of Cao Cao's death, Zang Ba's troops from Qing Province took leave without permission and refused to take command from Cao Pi, Cao Cao's successor. Nevertheless, Cao Pi was successful on stabilising the situation, and formally established the state of Cao Wei with himself as its emperor after usurping the throne from the last Han emperor, Emperor Xian.

After ascending the throne, Cao Pi promoted Zang Ba along most of the officials. the new emperor placed Zang Ba under the supervision of the general Cao Xiu, who had supreme authority over Qing and Xu provinces. Zang Ba accompanied Cao Xiu in a three-pronged invasion against Wu territories in 222.

Zang Ba and Cao Xiu had success attacking the Wu forces under command of Lü Fan at the Battle of Dongkou, though the battle ended in a retreat. To take advantage of Lü Fan's defeat after being hit by a storm and retreat south of the river, Zang Ba was sent to attack Xuling (Jingkou) with 500 light boats and 10,000 volunteers but Zang Ba's siege engines were burnt and Wu defenders killed several of his men. Zang Ba attempted to retreat but was pursued by Sun Shao and Quan Cong, thousands of his soldiers killed or captured with subordinate general Yin Lu killed. The campaign would be ended the next year as Cao Pi's forces were stalled and epidemic swept through the land so a retreat was ordered

==== Later life and death ====
After the campaign, Zang Ba was summoned back to Luoyang to serve as Bearer of the Golden Mace (執金吾, chief of police in the imperial capital). However, he refused to leave his troops and complained to Cao Xiu that Cao Pi did not make use of his full potential, and claimed that "if he was given 10,000 infantry and cavalry, he would be invincible along the Yangtze River." Cao Xiu reported Zang's speech to Cao Pi. Cao Pi, who still bore a grudge against Zang Ba for his arrogance at Cao Cao's funeral, plotted to strip off his military command. Zang Ba went to Cao Pi's tent to greet him, but the emperor relieved him of his command and sent him to Luoyang.

Even though Zang Ba no longer served in the military, Cao Pi still consulted him on military affairs from time to time and treated him respectfully. In 226, following Cao Pi's death, Cao Rui became the new emperor and he increased the number of taxable households in Zang Ba's marquisate to 3,500, a number higher than other marquises who held key military appointments along Wei's eastern border. (Note: Cao Xiu had 2,500 households while Zhang Liao had 2,600 households in their respective marquisates.) After his death, Zang Ba received the posthumous title "Marquis Wei" (威侯; literally "majestic marquis") and was succeeded by one of his sons, Zang Ai.

== See also ==
- Lists of people of the Three Kingdoms
