= Zou Jing (Eastern Han) =

Late 2nd century Chinese military officer

- 鄒靖

Colonel Who Defeats Barbarians (破虜校尉)
- In office ?–?
- Monarch: Emperor Ling of Han

Beijun Zhonghou (北軍中侯)
- In office ?–?
- Monarch: Emperor Ling of Han

Personal details
- Born: Unknown
- Died: Unknown
- Occupation: Military officer

Zou Jing (fl. 184–185) was a military officer who lived during the Eastern Han dynasty of China.

== Life ==
Zou Jing served as a Colonel Who Defeats Barbarians (破虜校尉). In 184, when the Yellow Turban Rebellion broke out, he led government forces to attack the rebels in You Province. During this time, Liu Bei led a group of volunteers to join him in fighting the rebels.

The Yingxiong Ji (英雄記) recorded that Zou Jing once served alongside Gongsun Zan in a battle against barbarians. Once, Zou Jing fell into a trap and was besieged by the barbarians. Gongsun Zan led his troops to attack the barbarians and lifted the siege. Both of them then led their men to attack the barbarians as they were retreating and succeeded in driving them away from the northern border.

In 185, when the Liang Province rebellion broke out, Zou Jing joined the general Huangfu Song in attacking the rebels. During this time, Zou Jing held the appointment Beijun Zhonghou (北軍中候), a high-ranking commander among the imperial guards. During this time, Zou Jing proposed that they recruit soldiers from the Xianbei tribes, rather than the Wuhuan tribes, to assist them in fighting the rebels. Han Zhuo (韓卓), a military officer, agreed with Zou Jing and said that if Zou Jing had 5,000 Xianbei horsemen with him, he could defeat the rebels. However, Ying Shao (應劭) disagreed because he believed that the Xianbei were greedy and less trustworthy than the Wuhuan. The generals then convened a meeting to discuss both ideas and eventually adopted Ying Shao's.

== See also ==
- Lists of people of the Three Kingdoms
