= GZJ =

GZJ may refer to:

- GZJ, division code for Guangzong County, China
- Grid Zone Junction, used in Military Grid Reference System
- GZJ, ICD-10-PCS code for light therapy
