= Ma Midi =

Chinese Eastern Han dynasty official (died 194)

- 馬日磾

Manager of the Affairs of the Masters of Writing (錄尚書事)
- In office 192 – 194
- Monarch: Emperor Xian of Han

Grand Tutor (太傅)
- In office 192 – 194
- Monarch: Emperor Xian of Han

Grand Commandant (太尉)
- In office 191 – 192
- Monarch: Emperor Xian of Han
- Chancellor: Dong Zhuo

Personal details
- Born: 140 Xingping, Shaanxi
- Died: 194 Shou County, Anhui
- Relations: Ma Rong (relative)
- Occupation: Official
- Courtesy name: Wengshu (翁叔)

Ma Midi (died 194), courtesy name Wengshu, was an official who lived during the late Eastern Han dynasty of China.

== Life ==
Ma Midi was from Maoling County (茂陵縣), Youfufeng Commandery (右扶風郡), which is located northeast of present-day Xingping, Shaanxi. He was a relative of Ma Rong, an influential Confucian scholar and government official. Ma Midi studied under Ma Rong's tutelage in his younger days and later joined the government service as a Counsellor Remonstrant (諫議大夫). During this time, he and his colleagues Lu Zhi, Cai Yong, Yang Biao (楊彪) and others proofread, edited and annotated the official copies of the Four Books and Five Classics and Dongguan Hanji (東觀漢記) stored in the imperial library. Later, he was reassigned to be a Household Counsellor (光祿大夫).

In 191, during the reign of Emperor Xian (r. 189–220), Ma Midi was promoted to Grand Commandant (太尉) by Dong Zhuo, the warlord who controlled the Han central government and the figurehead Emperor Xian from 189 to 192. In 192, Dong Zhuo was assassinated in Chang'an by Lü Bu and Wang Yun, who became the new head of the central government. When Cai Yong allegedly expressed grief at Dong Zhuo's death, Wang Yun had him imprisoned and sentenced to death. Ma Midi and other officials pleaded for leniency on Cai Yong's behalf, but Wang Yun refused and had Cai Yong executed.

Ma Midi became disappointed with Wang Yun and predicted that he would not remain in power for long. He was proven right: Later in 192, Dong Zhuo's followers, led by Li Jue and Guo Si, seized power from Wang Yun, killed him, and subsequently took control of the central government with Emperor Xian as a puppet ruler. Li Jue and Guo Si appointed Ma Midi as Grand Tutor (太傅) and Manager of the Affairs of the Masters of Writing (錄尚書事).

One month later, Ma Midi and Zhao Qi were each granted a fu (a tally symbolising imperial authority) and ordered to pay official visits to high-ranking regional officials as representatives of the central government. Ma Midi was also tasked with conferring the appointment "General of the Left" (左將軍) and the noble title "Marquis of Yangzhai" (陽翟侯) on the warlord Yuan Shu in Shouchun (壽春; present-day Shou County, Anhui). When Ma Midi visited Yuan Shu, the latter treated him rudely, seized the fu from him and used it to consolidate his own power base in the Huai River region. Ma Midi, feeling ashamed of losing the fu, attempted to leave Shouchun, but Yuan Shu stopped him and tried to force him to be his adviser. Feeling frustrated and humiliated, Ma Midi vomited blood and died in Shouchun in 194.

== See also ==
- Lists of people of the Three Kingdoms
