= Yin Li (disambiguation) =

Yin Li (尹力), is the Communist Party Secretary of Beijing and a member of the 20th Politburo of the Chinese Communist Party

Yin Li or Yinli may also refer to:

- Yīnlì (阴历), the Chinese calendar
- Yin Li (Cao Wei) (尹禮), Cao Wei military officer in the Three Kingdoms period
- Yin Li (Eastern Wu) (殷禮), Eastern Wu official in the Three Kingdoms period
- Yunli, birth name Yinli (胤禮), Qing dynasty prince and a son of the Kangxi Emperor
- Yin Li (director) (尹力), Chinese director
- Yin Li (殷離), a fictional character in the novel The Heaven Sword and Dragon Saber
