= Ma Xiang =

Chinese warlord and bandit leader

- Native name: 馬相
- Born: Liang Province
- Died: c. 188 Yi Province
- Allegiance: Yellow Turban rebels
- Service years: ?–188
- Rank: Self-declared Emperor of China
- Commands: Yellow Turbans of Yi Province
- Conflicts: Late Yellow Turban Rebellion

Ma Xiang (died c. 188) was a self-declared Emperor of China, Yellow Turban rebel, warlord, and bandit leader who lived in the late 2nd century. Although operating after the main Yellow Turban Rebellion had been defeated, Ma proved highly successful in leading a large insurgency in the western Han Empire of China. At the peak of his power, he controlled most of the northern Yi Province before being defeated and killed by Han loyalist Jia Long.

== Biography ==
=== Early life ===
According to Chang Qu's Chronicles of Huayang, Ma was born in Liang Province. There, he became a bandit leader, operating alongside Zhao Zhi (趙祗). It is unlikely that Ma had any actual links to the Yellow Turban movement of Zhang Jue in eastern China. When Ma and his forces marched southward into Yi Province, ex-Han army troops of Qiang origin were still engaged in an open rebellion in Liang Province. According to researcher J.M. Farmer, it is possible that Ma had enlisted some Qiang soldiers.

=== Rebellion in Yi Province ===
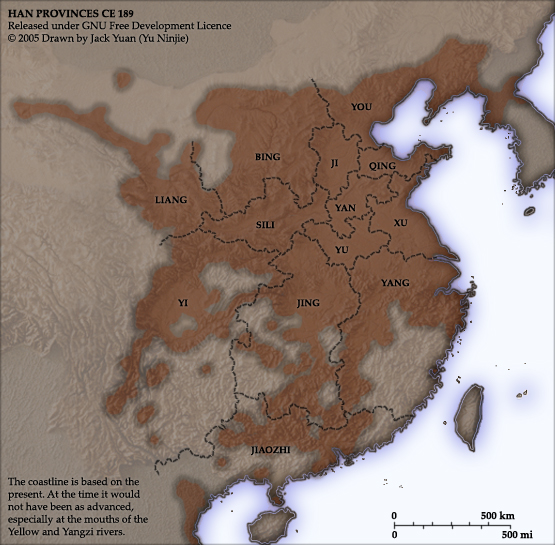
Ma Xiang controlled much of northern Yi Province in c. 188.

Ma and Zhao initially entered Yi Province at Guanghan commandery. The exact timing of their invasion is unclear, as the primary sources differ in the dating. The Chronicles of Huayang record the year 184, while the Book of the Later Han claims 189. Farmer and historian Rafe de Crespigny regard 188 as most likely.

Ma and Zhao proclaimed themselves Yellow Turbans to the locals at Mianzhu. In just one or two days, they gathered thousands of discontented peasants, and killed the local prefect Li Sheng. (Note: One source calls the magistrate killed at Mianzhu "Yi Pou" instead of Li Sheng.) Their army consequently grew even further to over 10,000 rebels, as more peasants and clerks joined their cause. Based on the sparse accounts of the events, Farmer argued that the uprising was a reaction to corrupt Han government officials and not religiously motivated like the Yellow Turban uprisings in eastern China. Using their growing army, Ma and Zhao overran Luo city, the headquarters of Yi Province, where Inspector Xi Jian was killed. Xi Jian had been notorious for his deeply corrupt governance, and the Han imperial court had actually ordered his dismissal at the time when Ma and Zhao invaded Yi Province.

After overthrowing Xi, the rebels conquered the Shu (Note: The seat of the Shu commandery was located at present-day Chengdu) and Qianwei commanderies, whereupon Ma Xiang declared himself Emperor of China (Son of Heaven). At this point, Farmer argued that Ma was a regional warlord, and Crespigny stated that Ma effectively dominated the entire northern Yi Province. In their march from Luo to Qianwei, Ma and his followers had crossed a distance of over 100 kilometres (62 mi). Yellow Turban insurgents under Zhao Fa also assaulted the Ba commandery where they ordered the local nobles to turn over their wives and daughters. Many noble women consequently sought refuge in the walled city of Langzhong which the Yellow Turbans were unable to conquer.

As a result of the uprising, the new Inspector of Yi Province, Liu Yan, dared not to enter the Chengdu Plain. While the regular Han government forces were incapable of stopping his forces, Ma Xiang encountered fierce opposition from a member of the region's elite: A noble named Jia Long raised a small private army from his family's estates and various low-ranking volunteers, amassing about 1,000 men. Despite Ma's army greatly outnumbering his opponent, he was defeated, although all sources for the events are extremely vague on how Jia Long achieved this success. Ma was killed during the fighting.

=== Aftermath of his rebellion ===
Despite Ma's defeat, the region remained chaotic, as bandits, rebel remnants, private armies, and rogue soldiers roamed the area. After having endured the previous Yellow Turban attack, Langzhong was plundered during this time. Farmer and researcher Ren Naiqiang have argued that Jia Long's troops were probably responsible. Jia initially helped Liu Yan to set up a new regional government and was promoted to colonel for his role in defeating Ma's uprising. However, Jia later rebelled against Liu Yan, but was also defeated and killed. Ren regarded it as possible that a later religious rebel, Zhang Xiu (張脩), was in fact leader of Yellow Turban remnants from Ma's uprising. Researcher T.F. Kleeman agreed that this was possible, believing Zhang to be most probably a Yellow Turban or an independent insurgent.
