= Guangzong =

Guangzong may refer to:

- Guangzong County, in Hebei, China
- Emperor Guangzong of Song (1147–1200), Chinese emperor of the Song dynasty
- Ming Guangzong, Taichang Emperor (1582–1620), Chinese emperor of the Ming dynasty
