= Zuo Feng =

- Traditional Chinese: 左豐
- Simplified Chinese: 左丰
Transcriptions
Standard Mandarin
- Hanyu Pinyin: Zuǒ Fēng

Zuo Feng (fl.184) was a eunuch who lived during the Eastern Han dynasty. According to the Romance of the Three Kingdoms and Book of the Later Han, Zuo Feng had Lu Zhi arrested on trumped up charges after Lu Zhi failed to pay Zuo a bribe during the Yellow Turban Rebellion. Nothing further is known about Zuo.
