= She Yuan =

Early 3rd century Shu Han state official

- 射援

Officer to the Gentlemen of the Household (事中郎)
- In office ?–?
- Monarch: Liu Shan
- Chancellor: Zhuge Liang

Libationer (祭酒)
- In office ?–?
- Monarch: Liu Shan
- Chancellor: Zhuge Liang

Bureau of Consultation Assistant Officer (議曹從事)
- In office ?–?
- Monarch: Liu Bei

Gentleman of the Household (中郎)
- In office ?–?
- Monarch: Liu Bei

General of the Household for Military Consultations (軍議中郎將)
- In office ?–?
- Monarch: Liu Bei

Personal details
- Born: Unknown Xingping, Shaanxi
- Died: Unknown
- Spouse: Huangfu Song’s daughter
- Relations: She Jian (brother)
- Occupation: Official
- Courtesy name: Wenxiong (文雄)
- Other names: "Master She" (射君)

She Yuan (fl. 190s–220s), courtesy name Wenxiong, was an official of the state of Shu Han in the Three Kingdoms period of China. She Yuan was among the 11 recorded officers of Liu Bei who persuaded him to declare himself "King of Hanzhong" (漢中王). (Note: Other recorded officers to have encouraged Liu Bei to declare himself King are Ma Chao, Xu Jing, Pang Xi, Zhuge Liang, Guan Yu, Zhang Fei, Huang Zhong, Lai Gong (賴恭), Fa Zheng, Li Yan along with 110 unrecorded officers.)

== Historical sources on She Yuan's life ==
She Yuan is first mentioned inside Liu Bei's biography as one of the 11 leading figures to have persuaded Liu Bei to declare himself a vassal king to challenge Cao Cao, who was enfeoffed ("King of Wei") by Emperor Xian in 219. (Note: Your subject, Bureau of Consultation Assistant Officer (議曹從事), Gentleman of the Household (中郎) and General of the Household for Military Consultations (軍議中郎將) She Yuan (射援)) During the fifth century, Pei Songzhi expanded on his life by incorporating information from the Sanfu Jue Lu Zhu (Annotated Selected Records of Sanfu), by Zhao Qi and Zhi Yu (摯虞).

== Family background ==
She Yuan was from Youfufeng Commandery (右扶風郡), Sili Province which is in present-day Xingping, Shaanxi. His ancestors were at first named Xie (謝) and were related to the Xie's Beidi clans of the north. Their founding ancestor Xie Fu (謝服) joined the army as a general and participated in many expeditions. Because the Emperor believed that Xie was not an auspicious name; he changed it to She (射). From that moment on, Xie Fu's descendants adopted She as their surname.

== She Jian ==
She Yuan had an older brother, She Jian (射堅) whose courtesy name was Wengu (文固). In his youth, She Jian had a good reputation. He was recruited to serve as a Gentleman of the Yellow Gate (黃門侍郎) in the office of the Three Excellencies. In 189, Emperor Xian of Han ascended the imperial throne. At the beginning of his reign, there was great famine and chaos even among the cities's district. She Jian left his office and along with She Yuan travelled southwest until they reached Yi Province where they joined his Governor Liu Zhang. Liu Zhang appointed She Jian as his Chief Clerk (長史). In 214, Liu Bei conquered Yi province and further employed She Jian as Administrator of Guanghan (廣漢太守) and Administrator of Shu Commandery (蜀郡太守).

== Life ==
She Yuan at a young age was also famous because of his character. Grand Commandant (太尉) Huangfu Song esteemed him highly as a talented man. Therefore, he arranged a marriage between his daughter and She Yuan. When Zhuge Liang opened his office as Chancellor (丞相) following Liu Bei's death, he appointed She Yuan as Libationer (祭酒). Later, She was transferred to serve as Officer to the Gentlemen of the Household (事中郎). He died while serving in office.

Qing-era scholar Qian Dazhao (钱大昭) further believed that She Yuan is mentioned in Liu Bei's last will to his son as Master She (射君). The relevant passage is: "When Master She (射君) came, he told me that the Chancellor (Note: "Chancellor" refers to Zhuge Liang's title.) saw you as a bright and cultivated man exceeding all his expectations. If he see you as such, what further worry have I?"

== See also ==
- Lists of people of the Three Kingdoms
