= Dongguan Hanji =

Title page from a printed edition, volume 1

A page from a printed edition, volume 3

The Dongguan Hanji (Chinese: 東觀漢記) is a Chinese text that is a history of the Eastern Han dynasty. It was compiled in several stages by different people throughout the Eastern Han period. It was considered the standard history of the Eastern Han until the Tang dynasty when it replaced by the Book of the Later Han.

== Compilation ==
The book started to be written in 72 CE, when Emperor Ming of Han ordered that a history be written of the reign of his father Emperor Guangwu. Ban Gu, Chen Zong (陳宗), Yin Min, Meng Ji (孟冀), Ma Yan, and Du Fu were chosen to compile it. They worked on this project in the Orchid Terrace (Lan tai, 蘭臺), one of the libraries and archives in the Southern Palace complex in Luoyang. The result was a 28-chapter book entitled Jianwu zhu ji (建武注記), covering the time from 22 to 57 CE.

In 120 CE, Empress Dowager Deng Sui instructed Liu Zhen, Liu Taotu, Liu Yi, and Li You to expand the Jianwu zhu ji. They worked in the Eastern Lodge (Dong guan, 東觀), another library in the Southern Palace. Their completed work was entitled the Han ji (漢記), updating the text to cover the time from 58 to 106 CE.

In 151 or 152 CE, Emperor Huan ordered the Han ji to be expanded, with Fu Wuji, Huang Jing (黃景), Bian Shao, Zhu Mu, Cao Shou (曹壽), and Yan Du expanding the text in the Eastern Lodge, bringing the Han ji to a total of 114 chapters. This expansion covered the time from 107 to 146 CE.

Between 172 and 177 CE Emperor Ling ordered that the text be expanded again, with Ma Midi, Han Yue, Cai Yong, Lu Zhi, and Yang Biao as compilers. At this point the text was renamed to the Dongguan hanji and it covered the time up to 167 CE.

After the fall of the Eastern Han in 220, Yang Biao privately worked on the text before his death in 225 for a final round of revision and expansion. This brought the text to 143 volumes, with the text now covering the entire history of the Eastern Han up to its fall.

== Later history ==
Until the seventh century, the Dongguan Hanji was considered the standard history of the Eastern Han. It was regularly grouped with the Shiji and Hanshu as the "three histories" (Sanshi, 三史). The Dongguan Hanji was used as the main source for all subsequently compiled histories of the Eastern Han, including Fan Ye's Book of the Later Han. The Dongguan Hanji gradually faded in importance during the Tang dynasty, especially after Emperor Gaozong's crown prince Li Xian sponsored a commentary on the Book of the Later Han.

Once the Dongguan Hanji was replaced as a standard history, large parts of it began to be lost. The Book of Sui lists the text as having the original 143 volumes. By the Tang, it had been reduced to 127 or 126 volumes. By the Song dynasty, there were only 8 volumes remaining. By the Ming dynasty it had been largely lost as a separate complete work. The editors of the Siku Quanshu recovered 24 volumes from the Yongle Encyclopedia and other sources.

== Bibliography ==
- Loewe, Michael, ed. (1993). Early Chinese Texts: A Bibliographical Guide. Society for the Study of Early China. ISBN 9781557290434.
- Wilkinson, Endymion Porter (2013). Chinese History: A New Manual. Harvard University Press. ISBN 9780674067158.
