= Dapingtai Township =

Dapingtai Township 大平台乡
- Rural Township
- Dàpíngtái Xiāng
- Location in Hebei Location in China
- Coordinates: 37°06′12″N 115°07′22″E
- Country: People's Republic of China
- Province: Hebei
- Prefecture-level city: Xingtai
- County: Guangzong

Area
  - Total: 60.85 km^{2} (23.49 sq mi)

Population (2010)
  - Total: 40,521
  - Density: 666/km^{2} (1,720/sq mi)
- Time zone: UTC+8 (China Standard)

Dapingtai Township (Chinese: 大平台乡; pinyin: Dàpíngtái Xiāng) is a rural township located in Guangzong County, Xingtai, Hebei, China. According to the 2010 census, Dapingtai Township had a population of 40,521, including 20,295 males and 20,226 females. The population was distributed as follows: 8,027 people aged under 14, 29,328 people aged between 15 and 64, and 3,166 people aged over 65.

== See also ==
- List of township-level divisions of Hebei
