= Yin Li (Cao Wei) =

Chinese official and military officer (died c.223)

- 尹禮

Administrator of Dongguan Commandery (東莞郡太守) (under Cao Cao)
- In office 198–?
- Monarch: Emperor Xian of Han

Personal details
- Born: Unknown
- Died: Between October 222 and January 223 Dongkou (洞口; along the Yangtze near present-day Liyang, Jiangsu)
- Occupation: Military officer
- Other names: Yin Lu'er (尹盧兒); Yin Lu (尹盧)

Yin Li, also known as Yin Lu'er and Yin Lu, (Note: He was referred to as "Yin Lu" in Quan Cong's biography in the Sanguozhi.) was a military officer who served under the warlords Zang Ba, Lü Bu and Cao Cao in the late Eastern Han dynasty of China. Later, he served as a military officer in the state of Cao Wei during the Three Kingdoms period.

== Life ==
Sometime in the 190s, Yin Li, along with Zang Ba, Sun Guan (孫觀), Wu Dun (吳敦), Chang Xi (昌狶) and others, formed a small army, with Zang Ba as their chief, and garrisoned at Kaiyang County (開陽縣; present-day Linyi, Shandong).

In 198, when the warlords Cao Cao and Lü Bu were at war, Zang Ba and his followers led their troops to help Lü Bu. After Lü Bu's defeat and death at the Battle of Xiapi in February 199, Zang Ba and his followers willingly surrendered to Cao Cao and became his subordinates. Cao Cao appointed them to various positions and put Zang Ba in charge of parts of Qing and Xu provinces. Yin Li served as the Administrator of Dongguan Commandery (東莞郡; around present-day Yishui County, Shandong).

Yin Li served as a military officer in the state of Wei under Cao Cao's son and successor, Cao Pi, after Cao Pi usurped the throne in late 220 and established Wei to replace the Eastern Han dynasty. Between October 222 and January 223, Yin Li fought in the Battle of Dongkou against Wei's rival state, Eastern Wu. He was killed in action against the Wu general Quan Cong.

== See also ==
- Lists of people of the Three Kingdoms
