= Zhang Jue =

Chinese Yellow Turban Rebellion leader (died 184)

Zhang Jue 張角: Great Teacher (大賢良師); General of Heaven (天公將軍)
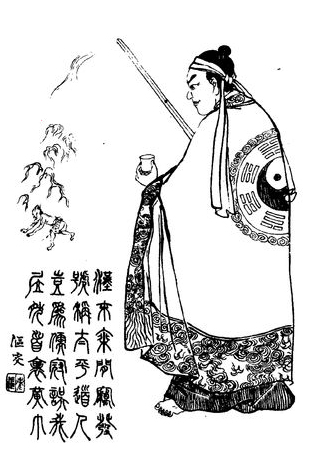
- A Qing dynasty illustration of Zhang Jue
- Born: Unknown; Julu Commandery (in present-day Hebei province)
- Died: 184; Guangzong County, Julu Commandery (present-day Guangzong County, Hebei)
- Occupations: Military general, rebel
- Relatives: Zhang Bao (brother); Zhang Liang (brother)

Zhang Jue ([ʈʂáŋtɕɥě]; died c. October 184) was a religious leader in ancient China who became a military general and led the Yellow Turban Rebellion during the late Eastern Han dynasty of China. He had a reputation as a Taoist sorcerer capable of performing miracles, and he became extraordinarily popular. Proclaiming the government as corrupt and oppressive, he and his followers attempted to take over the capital city but was thwarted. His name is sometimes read as Zhang Jiao ([ʈʂáŋtɕjàʊ]), since the Chinese character of Zhang's given name can be read as either "Jiao" or "Jue", which are 2 different pronunciations of the same character that evolved through different routes.

== Yellow Turban Rebellion ==
The Yellow Turbans originated as a Taoist movement called the Tàipíng Dào or "Way of the Great Peace" (太平道), which had started well over a decade prior to the rebellion. Zhang Jue's followers hailed him as being able to cure patients by giving them water blessed by the burning of talismans (fulu). Those who recovered then believed in him and his teachings, and his fame spread by word of mouth. Professor Rafe de Crespigny noted that disease outbreaks were reported in Han dynasty China in 171, 173, 179, 182, and 185 CE, with the potential cause theorized as the Antonine Plague of 165 to 180CE of smallpox or measles spreading along the Silk Road.

Giving himself the title of "Great Teacher" (大賢良師), Zhang Jue led the rebellion with his younger brothers Zhang Bao (張寶) and Zhang Liang (張梁). He and his brothers gave themselves titles: Zhang Bao was the "General of Earth" (地公將軍), Zhang Liang was the "General of the People" (人公將軍); and Zhang Jue was the "General of Heaven" (天公將軍). The Yellow Turbans claimed to be Taoists, and rebelled against the Han dynasty in response to burdensome taxes, rampant corruption, and famine and flooding, which were seen as indications that the Han emperor had lost the mandate of heaven.

During this time, Zhang spoke of the magic he thought himself capable of to his followers, and "promised that if they took his medicines, they would be immune from wounds and could fight in battle without fear".

The rebellion began in c.March 184. The Yellow Turbans conquered significant territory in the early years of the rebellion, but after a failed siege of the capital, they could not hold out against Han imperial forces led by He Jin, Lu Zhi, Dong Zhuo, Huangfu Song, Zhu Jun and others. Zhang Jue died from sickness later in October 184.

Although the Yellow Turbans still remained capable even in face of their more powerful foe, they were nonetheless torn apart upon the death of their leader, and were eventually defeated and dispersed. Zhang Bao was defeated and killed by imperial forces led by Huangfu Song and Guo Dian (郭典) in December 184 or January 185 at Xiaquyang County (下曲陽縣; west of present-day Jinzhou, Hebei), while Zhang Liang also met his end in November or December 184 at the hands of imperial forces led by Huangfu Song at Guangzong County (廣宗縣; southeast of present-day Guangzong County, Hebei).

Large groups of Yellow Turbans roamed through China for years after the rebellion's defeat, most of them eventually joining the army of the warlord Cao Cao, whose agrarian reform policies closely matched Zhang Jue's own programme.

== In Romance of the Three Kingdoms ==
Zhang Jue is also featured in the 14th-century historical novel Romance of the Three Kingdoms. He is introduced in Chapter 1 as follows:

At that time, there lived three brothers in Julu Commandery: Zhang Jue, Zhang Bao and Zhang Liang. Zhang Jue had passed the county-level civil service exam, but had failed to go any higher than that. He had gone into the mountains to gather some medicinal herbs, when he came across an old man; the old man had a youthful countenance, and was carrying a fat-hen walking stick. The old man beckoned Jue into a cave, presented him with a book in three volumes which had come from the heavens, then said, "This book is called The Essential Art of Great Peace. Once you have mastered its contents, you will represent the heavens in spreading this knowledge, and thereby save all of mankind. If you start to have second thoughts, there will be terrible consequences for you." Jue enquired as to the old man's name. The old man said, "I am the old immortal spirit from the southern lands." With that, the old man vanished into thin air. Upon receiving this book, Jue practiced night and day. Eventually, he could summon the wind and rain, and came to be known as the Great Peace Taoist. (Wikisource translation)

Zhang Jue then goes on to start the Yellow Turban Rebellion with his brothers. Little time is devoted to Zhang Jue in the book, and his death is given a line in the second chapter: "Zhang Jue had died before his (Huangfu Song's) arrival." After his death, his body was beheaded and his head sent to the capital Luoyang. In the novel, his brother Zhang Bao does not die in battle against imperial forces, but meets his end at the hands of a subordinate, Yan Zheng (嚴政), who cuts off his head and surrenders to imperial forces.

== In popular culture ==
Zhang Jue appears as a playable character in Koei's Dynasty Warriors and Warriors Orochi video games series, as well as serving as an antagonist in Capcom's Destiny of an Emperor for the Nintendo Entertainment System. He is referred to as "Zhang Jiao" in these games. He is also seen as one of the antagonists of the light gun shooting game SEGA Golden Gun.

In Total War: Three Kingdoms' fourth DLC installment, Mandate of Heaven, Zhang Jue and his brothers lead the playable Yellow Turban factions who seek to overthrow the failing Han dynasty and establish a new order in China.

In the action role-playing game Wo Long: Fallen Dynasty, Zhang Jue and his brothers appear as separate boss fights.

In the Japanese mobile gacha game Fate/Grand Order, Zhang Jue is a summonable character the player can use in battles. According to the game's story, Zhang Jue is a magic-user who serves an alien life form in Area 51.

== See also ==
- Lists of people of the Three Kingdoms
