= Lu County rebellion =

Rebellion against Cao Cao (209)

- Part of the Red Cliffs campaign
| Date | 209 CE |
| Location | Lu County (六縣; in present-day Lu'an, Anhui) |
| Result | Cao Cao victory Rebellion suppressed |

Belligerents
| Chen Lan; Mei Cheng; Sun Quan | Cao Cao |

Commanders and leaders
| Chen Lan; Mei Cheng; Sun Quan; Han Dang | Zhang Liao; Yu Jin; Zang Ba; Zhang He |

The Lu County Rebellion took place in 209 CE in Lu County (六縣; in present-day Lu'an, Anhui) after the Battle of Red Cliffs in the late Eastern Han dynasty of China. Chen Lan (陳蘭) and Mei Cheng (梅成), two former subordinates of the warlord Yuan Shu, started the rebellion. The warlord Cao Cao, who controlled the Han central government, sent two separate forces to suppress the rebellion: Yu Jin and Zang Ba were to attack Mei Cheng, while Zhang Liao, with Zhang He and Niu Gai (牛蓋) as his deputies, were to attack Chen Lan.

As soon as the two forces clashed, Mei Cheng pretended to surrender to Yu Jin, and then led his men to join Chen Lan at Mount Tianzhu as soon as Yu Jin and Zang Ba left. On the other hand, Zhang Liao was worried that Cao Cao's rival, the warlord Sun Quan, would send his general Han Dang with an army to assist Chen Lan. Han Dang was in charge of defending Wancheng (皖城), a major stronghold in Lujiang Commandery at the time, so Zhang Liao sent Zang Ba to attack Wancheng so as to ensure that Han Dang could not move to reinforce the rebels. Zang Ba attacked Wancheng, but Han Dang defended the city well and succeeded in driving Zang Ba back. Later Sun Quan dispatched an army of some 20,000 to 30,000 troops to assist Chen Lan but Zang Ba was able to ambush and drive away the reinforcements sent by Sun Quan. However, Zang Ba did not stop there as he gave chase at night and attacked in the morning. Many soldiers of Sun Quan could not board their ships, and were forced into the water and drowned. Without the intervention from Sun Quan, Zhang Liao suppressed Chen Lan's rebellion and both he and Mei Cheng were killed.
