= Yellow Turban Rebellion =

Peasant revolt against the Eastern Han dynasty

- Part of the wars at the end of the Han dynasty
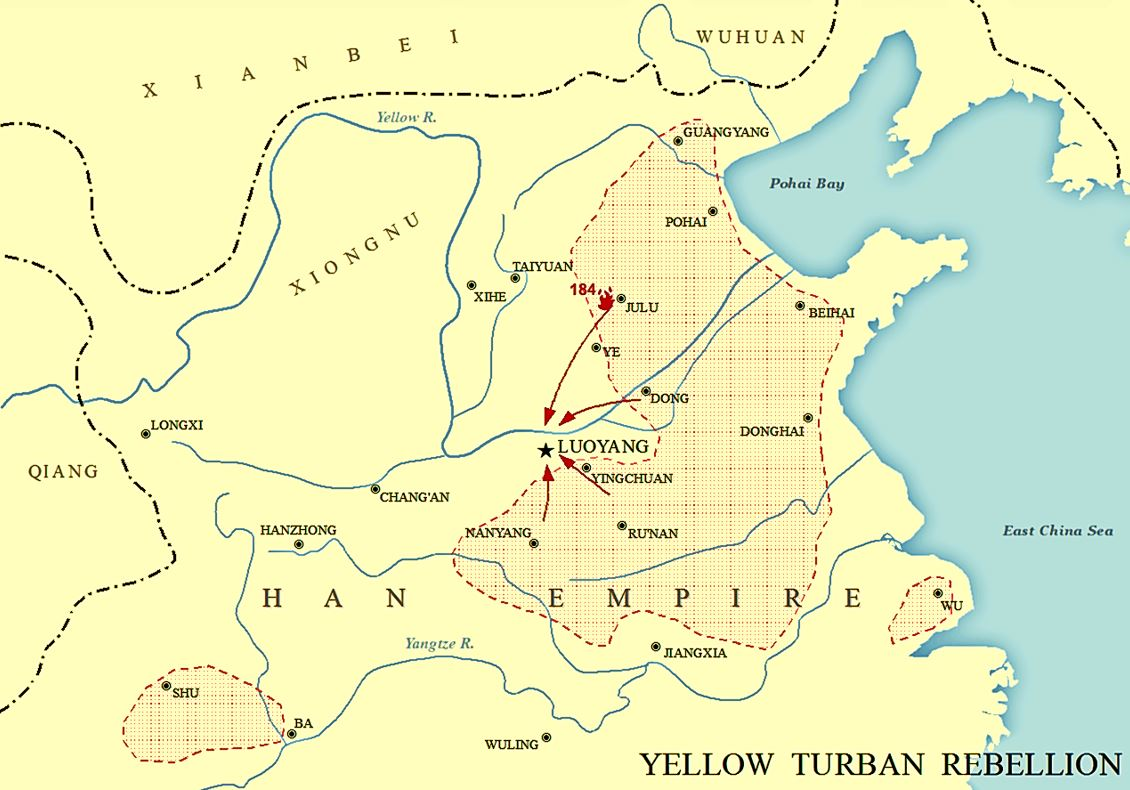
- Map showing the extent of the Yellow Turban Rebellion in China in 184 AD
Date	March 184–205 AD
Location	Various locations in China
Result	Rebellion suppressed, Han victory: Han dynasty heavily weakened; Beginning of a state of turmoil in China

Belligerents
Han dynasty	Yellow Turban Army

Commanders and leaders
Emperor Ling; He Jin; Huangfu Song; Lu Zhi; Zhu Jun	Zhang Jue †; Zhang Bao †; Zhang Liang †

Strength
350,000	2,000,000 (360,000 were initially followers of Zhang Jue)

Casualties and losses
- Unknown (Note: "We do not find any statistical evidence telling us just how much destruction these raids caused, how many Chinese they either killed or displaced.")

Yellow Turban Rebellion
- Traditional Chinese: 黃巾之亂
- Simplified Chinese: 黄巾之乱
- Literal meaning: Yellow turban conflict
Transcriptions
Standard Mandarin
- Hanyu Pinyin: Huángjīn zhī luàn
- IPA: [xwǎŋtɕín ʈʂɨ́ lwân]
Yue: Cantonese
- Yale Romanization: Wòhnggān jī lyuhn
- Jyutping: wong4 gan1 zi1 lyun6

The Yellow Turban Rebellion (Chinese: 黃巾之亂; pinyin: Huángjīn zhī luàn), alternatively translated as the Yellow Scarves Rebellion, was a peasant revolt during the late Eastern Han dynasty of ancient China. The uprising broke out in 184 AD, during the reign of Emperor Ling. Although the main rebellion was suppressed by 185 AD, it took 21 years to fully subdue resisting areas and emerging rebellions, which was only achieved in 205 AD. The weakening of the imperial court and the rising political influence of autonomous regional military-governors, who helped suppress the rebellion, eventually led to rampant warlord dominance and the resultant Three Kingdoms period.

The rebellion, which took its name from the colour of the rebels' headwear (巾 jīn, defined as more of a scarf than a turban) marked an important point in the history of Taoism due to the rebel leaders' association with the then secret Taoist societies. The revolt was also used as the inciting event in the 14th-century historical novel Romance of the Three Kingdoms.

== Background ==
By 184 AD, the Han Dynasty's central government was weakened by court eunuchs abusing their power over the emperor to enrich themselves. Twelve of the most powerful eunuchs were referred to as the Ten Attendants with Emperor Ling once claiming that "Regular Attendant Zhang Rang is my father and Regular Attendant Zhao Zhong is my mother". The government corruption was perceived as causing plagues, natural disasters, and poor agricultural yields, reflecting that the emperor had lost his Mandate of Heaven.

As flooding along the Yellow River forced farmers and military settlers south, the labor surplus incentivized exploitation. Disease outbreaks were reported in 171, 173, 179, 182, and 185 AD, with the potential cause theorized as the Antonine Plague of 165 to 181CE of smallpox or measles spreading along the Silk Road.

Through claims of providing curative water and bamboo playing, the Taoist leader Zhang Jue developed his initial following to send his disciples throughout northern China in preparation for a revolt. Their rapid rise was relatively unnoticed until they became too powerful to challenge. Zhang Jue intended to launch an uprising throughout the Han Empire, but the plan was betrayed before he was ready. Rebel sympathizers in Luoyang were arrested and executed, forcing a premature beginning in March 184. Despite the inevitable lack of co-ordination and overall preparation, tens of thousands of men rose in rebellion. Government offices were plundered and destroyed and the imperial armies were immediately forced on the defensive.

== Rebels ==
The rebellion was led by Zhang Jue (also referred to as Zhang Jiao, known to his followers as the "General of Heaven") and his two younger brothers Zhang Bao (張寶) and Zhang Liang (張梁), who were born in Julu Commandery. The brothers had founded a Taoist religious sect in present-day Shandong, praised as healers who offered free care to impoverished patients. Recognizing how the local government abused the peasant class through harsh labor and heavy taxes, they plotted rebellion.

=== Taoist sect ===
The rebels were the first followers of the Way of Supreme Peace (太平道; Tàipíng Dào) and venerated the deity Huang–Lao, who according to Zhang Jue, had given him a sacred book called the Crucial Keys to the Way of Peace (太平要術; Tàipíng Yàoshù) based on the Taipingjing. Zhang Jue, who was said to be a sorcerer, called himself the "Great Teacher" (大賢良師). When the rebellion was proclaimed on 4 March, Zhang Jue created a 16-word slogan spread through the brothers' medical work:

The Azure Sky (Note: Referring to the Han government) is already dead; the Yellow Sky (Note: Referring to the Yellow Turban Rebellion) will soon rise.
When the year is jiǎzǐ, (Note: That is, at the beginning of the next cycle, i.e. 184 AD.) there will be prosperity under Heaven!
(蒼天已死，黃天當立。歲在甲子，天下大吉。)

=== Religious practices ===
Zhang Jue claimed to cure patients by having them confess sins for Taoist faith healing. The Zhang brothers believed in an impending apocalyptic change in the jiazi year, the beginning of the new sexagenary cycle, involving yellow skies marking new governance, which inspired the color of their headwear. Through the sect's communal activities like trances, fasting, musical performances, chanting, incense burning, and sermons, followers united across ethnic and gender lines. Several Xiongnu leaders, such as Yufuluo, lent their support, potentially inspiring Zhang Jue to adopt their shamanistic beliefs.

Despite few surviving records, the early Path of Supreme Peace was likely similar to the Way of the Celestial Masters, considering that Zhang Jue claimed to be a descendant of Zhang Daoling. Much of the Taipingjing's surviving 52 chapters, found in the Daozang, have a direct relationship to the Way of the Celestial Masters with discrepancies potentially suppressed by later Taoists.

== Zhang Jue's plans for rebellion ==
About a month before the rebellion, Zhang Jue ordered one of his advisors, Ma Yuanyi (馬元義) to recruit followers from both Jing and Yang provinces and have them gather in Ye (present-day Linzhang County, Handan, Hebei and Anyang, Henan). Since Ma Yuanyi frequently made visits to the Han imperial capital of Luoyang (present-day Luoyang, Henan), he was able to persuade Feng Xu (封諝) and Xu Feng (徐奉), two members of Emperor Ling's trusted eunuch faction, to secretly aid Zhang Jue while feigning loyalty to the Emperor. However, a few days before the rebellion was set to begin, the Yellow Turbans were suddenly betrayed. One of the Taiping Dao's founding members, Tang Zhou (唐周), was excluded from further planning for reasons unknown, so he reported Ma Yuanyi to the proper authorities. Ma Yuanyi was later arrested and subsequently executed by dismemberment in Luoyang not too long after.

When Emperor Ling was notified of what Zhang Jue and the Taiping Dao was plotting, he ordered Zhou Bin (周斌), Prefect of the Palace Parks (鉤盾令), to conduct an investigation and capture any co-conspirators that sided with Zhang Jue. Hundreds of people were arrested and executed during this time.

== Yellow Rebellion ==
When Zhang Jue heard that the Han government had learned about his plans to rebel, he quickly sent messengers to contact his allies throughout China and take action immediately. In March, Zhang Jue started the Yellow Turban Rebellion with roughly 360,000 followers wearing yellow headscarves or turbans. He called himself the "Lord General of Heaven" (天公將軍), while his brothers Zhang Bao and Zhang Liang were called the "Lord General of Earth" (地公將軍) and "Lord General of Man" (人公將軍), respectively. The rebels attacked government offices, pillaged villages, and seized control of commanderies. Within 10 days, the rebellion had spread throughout China, alarming the Han imperial court in Luoyang.

The rebels were mostly concentrated in the Ji, Jing, You and Yu provinces. The group led by Zhang Jue and his brothers gained their support in Ji Province, located just north of the Yellow River, near Zhang Jue's home territory of Julu Commandery (around present-day Pingxiang County, Hebei) and Wei Commandery (around present-day Handan, Hebei). A second major uprising took place in Guangyang Commandery (around present-day Beijing) and Zhuo Commandery (around present-day Zhuozhou, Hebei) in You Province. The third centre of the rebellion was in Yingchuan Commandery (around present-day Xuchang, Henan) and Runan Commandery (around present-day Xinyang, Henan) in Yu Province, and Nanyang Commandery (around present-day Nanyang, Henan) in northern Jing Province.

On 1 April 184, Emperor Ling appointed his brother-in-law He Jin, the Intendant of Henan (河南尹), as General-in-Chief (大將軍) and ordered him to supervise the imperial armies in suppressing the rebellion. Emperor Ling also appointed three generals – Lu Zhi, Huangfu Song and Zhu Jun – to lead three separate armies to deal with the rebels with a total of roughly 40,000 troops. Lu Zhi went for Zhang Jue's base in Ji Province, while Huangfu Song and Zhu Jun headed to Yingchuan Commandery.

=== You Province: Guangyang and Zhuo commanderies ===
In You Province, the rebels killed Guo Xun (郭勳), the provincial Inspector, and Liu Wei (劉衛), the Administrator of Guangyang Commandery.

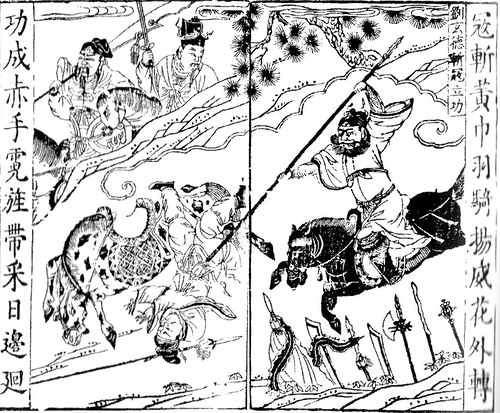
A Qing dynasty illustration of Liu Bei, Guan Yu, and Zhang Fei in 184 during the rebellion

Zou Jing, a colonel, led imperial forces to eliminate the rebels in You Province. Liu Bei led a group of volunteers (Note: Guan Yu and Zhang Fei's biographies in the Sanguozhi did not mention their involvement in the Yellow Turban Rebellion, but it seems reasonable to assume they were, since they joined Liu Bei rather early.) to assist him so.

=== Yu Province: Runan and Yingchuan commanderies ===
When the rebellion first broke out in Yu Province, the Han imperial court specially selected Wang Yun to be the inspector of the province to oversee the military operations.

Zhao Qian (趙謙), the administrator of Runan Commandery, led his troops to attack the rebels before Zhu Jun arrived, but was defeated at Shaoling (邵陵; in present-day southeastern Henan). When Chen County (陳縣; present-day Huaiyang County, Henan) was under attack by the rebels, seven of Zhao Qian's subordinates, who were non-military personnel, armed themselves with swords and attempted to fight the rebels but were all killed. Later, after the rebellion was suppressed, Emperor Ling issued an edict to honor the seven as the "Seven Virtuous" (七賢).

Chen State (陳國; around present-day Zhoukou, Henan), one of the commanderies in Yu Province, avoided the Yellow Turban Rebellion's bloodshed because the rebels feared Prince Liu Chong, famous for his unit of skilled archers.

The rebels in Runan Commandery, led by Bo Cai (波才), initially defeated Zhu Jun in battle and drove him back. The imperial court sent a cavalry contingent, led by young officer Cao Cao (曹操), as reinforcements for Zhu Jun. Sometime between 28 May and 25 June, Zhu Jun, Huangfu Song, and Cao Cao joined forces to defeat Bo Cai at Changshe (長社; east of present-day Changge, Henan). While Bo Cai attempted to flee, Huangfu Song and Zhu Jun pursued him to Yangzhai County (陽翟縣; present-day Yuzhou, Henan) and defeated him again, causing the rebels to scatter.

Huangfu Song and Zhu Jun then defeated the rebels in Runan Commandery, led by Peng Tuo (彭脫), at Xihua County (西華縣; south of present-day Xihua County, Henan). The imperial court ordered them to split up: Huangfu Song would attack the rebels at Dong Commandery (東郡; around present-day Puyang County, Henan), while Zhu Jun would attack the rebels at Nanyang Commandery. During this time, Wang Yun, the Inspector of Yu Province, found evidence that the rebels had been secretly maintaining contact with Zhang Rang (張讓), the leader of the eunuch faction in Luoyang, so he reported it to Emperor Ling, who scolded Zhang Rang but did not punish him.

Between 7 November and 6 December, Bao Hong (鮑鴻), a colonel, led imperial forces to attack the rebels in Gebei (葛陂; northwest of present-day Xincai County, Henan) and defeated them.

=== Ji Province: Wei and Julu commanderies ===
In the meantime, Lu Zhi defeated Zhang Jue's rebel forces in Julu Commandery and besieged the rebel leader in Guangzong County (廣宗縣; southeast of present-day Guangzong County, Hebei). However, after a eunuch falsely accused Lu Zhi of treason, Emperor Ling ordered his arrest, escorted back to Luoyang as a prisoner. The imperial court then sent General Dong Zhuo to take over Lu Zhi's position and attack Zhang Jue. However, Dong Zhuo failed and retreated.

On 23 or 24 September, Huangfu Song and Fu Xie (傅燮), a Major under him, defeated the rebels at Cangting (倉亭; north of present-day Yanggu County, Shandong), captured their leader Bu Ji (卜己), and killed over 7,000 rebels, including other minor leaders Zhang Bo (張伯) and Liang Zhongning (梁仲寧). On 25 September, the imperial court ordered him to replace Dong Zhuo and lead his troops north to Guangzong County and attack Zhang Jue.

Zhang Jue died of illness in October 184 while under attack by Huangfu Song in Guangzong County. Between 21 November and 20 December, Huangfu Song kept attacking Zhang Liang, who had taken over command of his brother's followers at Guangzong County. Unable to defeat Zhang Liang's skilled Yellow Turbans, Huangfu Song switched to a defensive approach, tricking the rebels into lowering their guard for a devastating nighttime strike. Zhang Liang was killed in action alongside 30,000 rebels, while another 50,000 rebels drowned while attempting to flee across a river. Huangfu Song burnt over 30,000 carts containing rebel supplies and captured most of their family members. Huangfu Song then had Zhang Jue's body excavated and decapitated, sending his head to the imperial court in Luoyang.

In recognition of Huangfu Song's achievements, Emperor Ling promoted him to Left General of Chariots and Cavalry (左車騎將軍). Between 21 December 184 and 18 January 185, Huangfu Song joined forces with Guo Dian (郭典), the Administrator of Julu Commandery, to attack the remaining rebels led by Zhang Jue's other brother, Zhang Bao. They defeated the rebels at Xiaquyang County (下曲陽縣; west of present-day Jinzhou, Hebei), killed Zhang Bao, and received the surrender of over 100,000 rebels.

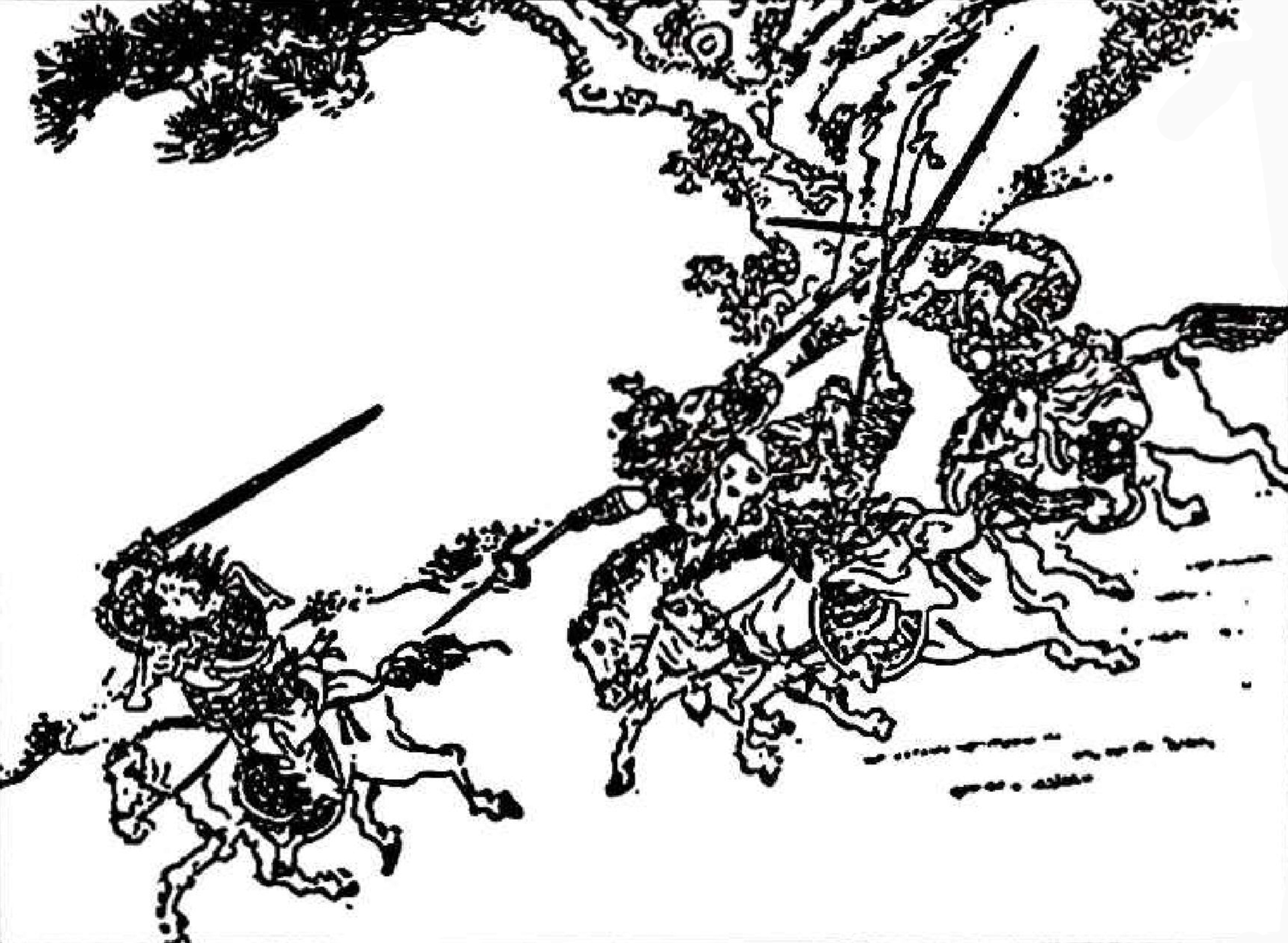

=== Jing Province: Nanyang commandery ===
On 24 March 184, the rebels led by Zhang Mancheng (張曼成) killed Chu Gong (褚貢), the Administrator of Nanyang Commandery, and occupied the commandery's capital, Wancheng (宛城; present-day Wancheng District, Nanyang, Henan). Chu Gong's successor, Qin Jie (秦頡), rallied local forces in Nanyang Commandery to attack Zhang Mancheng and defeated and killed him between 26 June and 25 July, before Zhu Jun's reinforcements arrived.

After Zhang Mancheng's death, Zhao Hong (趙弘) became the new rebel leader in Wancheng. During or after October 184, Qin Jie and Zhu Jun combined forces with Xu Qiu (徐璆), the Inspector of Jing Province, to attack Wancheng with an army of about 18,000. They defeated and killed Zhao Hong.

Following Zhao Hong's death, Han Zhong (韓忠) and the remaining rebels seized control of Wancheng, continuing to resist imperial forces. Zhu Jun ordered his troops to pretend to attack from the southwest, while he secretly led 5,000 elite soldiers to infiltrate Wancheng from the northeast. Han Zhong retreated into the citadel and requested to surrender. Qin Jie, Xu Qiu and Zhang Chao (張超), a Major under Zhu Jun, all urged Zhu Jun to accept Han Zhong's surrender, but he refused. Zhu Jun instead pretended to lift the siege to lure Han Zhong to come out and attack. Han Zhong fell for the ruse, lost the battle, and tried to flee north while some 10,000 of his men were slaughtered by imperial forces. In desperation, Han Zhong surrendered to Zhu Jun, but Qin Jie had him executed.

On 11 January 185, Zhu Jun defeated another rebel force led by Sun Xia (孫夏), who then fled towards Xi'e County (西鄂縣; north of present-day Nanyang, Henan). Zhu Jun pursued him there, defeated him and caused the remaining rebels to disperse.

=== Xu and Yang provinces ===
In Xu Province, the provincial Inspector Tao Qian, with the aid of Zang Ba, managed to defeat the rebels to restore regional peace.

Sun Jian, then a minor official serving in Xiapi County (下邳縣; south of present-day Pizhou, Jiangsu) in Xu Province, came to join Zhu Jun's army as a Major. He brought along several young men from Xiapi County and other soldiers recruited from the Huai River region.

In Yang Province, the rebels attacked Shu County (舒縣; in present-day central Anhui), a county in Lujiang Commandery (廬江郡; around present-day Lu'an, Anhui), and set fire to buildings. Yang Xu (羊續), the Administrator of Lujiang Commandery, successfully rallied thousands of able-bodied men aged 19 and above for countering the attack and firefighting.

=== End of the rebellion ===
By the beginning of 185, the rebellion had mostly been suppressed following Zhu Jun's recapture of Wancheng in Nanyang Commandery and Huangfu Song's victories over the Zhang brothers in Ji Province. The remaining, scattered rebels were pursued by government forces in smaller military campaigns, and by mid-February 185, Emperor Ling issued a celebratory proclamation by changing his era name from Guanghe (光和) to Zhongping (中平; "pacification achieved").

== Resurgent Yellow Turban activities after early 185 ==
Although the main Yellow Turban Rebellion ended by February 185, smaller rebellions by Yellow Turban remnants continued over the following two decades.

=== White Wave Bandits ===
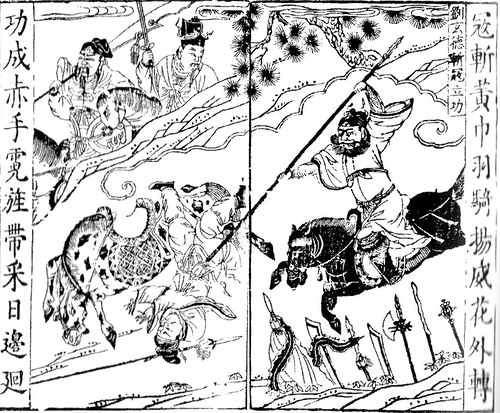

Between 16 March and 13 April 188, Guo Tai (郭太) led some 100,000 Yellow Turban remnants to start a rebellion in Xihe Commandery (around present-day Fenyang, Shanxi). As they originated from Baibo Valley (白波谷; "White Wave Valley") in Xihe Commandery, they later became known as the "White Wave Bandits" (白波賊). They allied with the Xiongnu leader Yufuluo and attacked Taiyuan Commandery (around present-day Taiyuan, Shanxi) and Hedong Commandery (around present-day Yuncheng, Shanxi). Between 27 October and 25 November 189, when the bandits attacked Hedong Commandery, the warlord Dong Zhuo's son-in-law Niu Fu attacked the bandits but failed in the attempt.

Around mid-195, Emperor Xian fled from the imperial capital Chang'an, where he had been held hostage by Dong Zhuo's followers, led by Li Jue and Guo Si, since Dong Zhuo's death in 192. He returned to the ruins of the old imperial capital Luoyang, which Dong Zhuo burnt down in 191 while forcefully relocating its residents to Chang'an. Dong Cheng (a former subordinate of Niu Fu) and Yang Feng (a former White Wave bandit) protected Emperor Xian in Luoyang when Li Jue and Guo Si tried to pursue and bring the emperor back to Chang'an. Dong Cheng and Yang Feng summoned the White Wave Bandits, led by Li Le (李樂), Han Xian, Hu Cai (胡才) and others, to come to Emperor Xian's aid. Xiongnu forces led by Qubei also responded to the call and came to help Emperor Xian resist Li Jue and Guo Si's forces. Between 195 and 196, the warlord Cao Cao led his forces into Luoyang and escorted Emperor Xian to his own base in Xu (許; present-day Xuchang, Henan) and established the new imperial capital there.

=== Yi Province: Ma Xiang and Zhao Zhi ===
In 188, Ma Xiang (馬相) and Zhao Zhi (趙祗) led Yellow Turban remnants to start a rebellion in Yi Province (covering present-day Sichuan and Chongqing). They killed Li Sheng (李升; Prefect of Mianzhu County 緜竹縣), Zhao Bu (趙部; Administrator of Ba Commandery 巴郡) and Xi Jian (郗儉; Inspector of Yi Province). Ma Xiang declared himself emperor before this sect of the rebellion was suppressed by local forces led by Jia Long (賈龍), a former subordinate of Xi Jian.

=== Xu Province ===
In c.November 188, there was a resurgence in Yellow Turban rebels in both Qing and Xu provinces, and they raided numerous counties. The Yellow Turbans in Xu Province were defeated after Tao Qian was appointed Inspector of the province.

=== Qing Province: Zhang Rao, Guan Hai, Xu He and Sima Ju ===
Around 189, Zhang Rao (張饒) led some 200,000 Yellow Turban remnants to ravage Qing Province. He defeated imperial forces under Kong Rong, the Han-appointed Chancellor of Beihai State (around present-day Weifang, Shandong) in Qing Province. Later, Kong Rong was besieged in Duchang County (都昌縣; present-day Changyi, Shandong) by thousands of Yellow Turban rebels led by Guan Hai (管亥). Taishi Ci, then a military officer under Kong Rong, managed to break out of the siege and seek help from Liu Bei, who was then the Chancellor of the nearby Pingyuan State. Liu Bei brought along 3,000 troops to attack Guan Hai and succeeded in saving Kong Rong.

In the 200s, Xu He (徐和) and Sima Ju (司馬俱) led Yellow Turban remnants from Jinan Commandery (around present-day Zhangqiu, Shandong) and Le'an Commandery (around present-day Zibo, Shandong) respectively to ravage Qing Province. They were defeated and killed by Xiahou Yuan, Zang Ba and Lü Qian some time between 206 and 209. (Note: It is not known exactly when Xu He and Sima Ju were defeated and killed. Xiahou Yuan's biography in the Sanguozhi mentioned them between the time Yu Jin quelled a rebellion by Chang Xi (in 206) and 209 (14th year of the Jian'an era).)

=== Yan Province: Cao Cao's Qingzhou Army ===
Around May 192, hundreds of thousands of Yellow Turban remnants from Qing Province swarmed into Yan Province and killed Zheng Sui (鄭遂), the Chancellor of Rencheng State (任城國; around present-day Zoucheng, Shandong), before moving into Dongping Commandery (東平郡; around present-day Dongping County, Shandong). Liu Dai, the Inspector of Yan Province, wanted to lead his troops to attack the rebels but the general Bao Xin advised him against it. Liu Dai ignored this advice, dying in his attack against the rebels. Bao Xin and another official, Wan Qian (萬潛), went to Dong Commandery (東郡; around present-day Puyang, Henan) to invite Cao Cao to be the new Governor of Yan Province. Bao Xin then led government forces to attack the rebels at the east of Shouzhang County (壽張縣; south of present-day Dongping County, Shandong) but was killed in action. Later, despite having fewer troops, Cao Cao managed to defeat the rebels in Jibei State. The rebels, numbering over 300,000, surrendered to Cao Cao along with their families. Cao Cao then recruited their best warriors and organised them to form an elite military unit, the Qingzhou (Note: Qingzhou refers to Qing Province, where the rebels came from.) Army (青州兵; also translated as "Qingzhou Corps").

=== Runan and Yingchuan commanderies: He Yi, Liu Pi, Gong Du and others ===
In Runan Commandery and Yingchuan Commandery, thousands of Yellow Turban remnants remained active under the leadership of He Yi (何儀), Liu Pi (劉辟), Huang Shao (黃邵), and He Man (何曼). They were initially allied with the warlords Yuan Shu and Sun Jian, but became an independent force in the 190s. Between 17 March and 15 April 196, the warlord Cao Cao led his forces to attack them and killed Liu Pi, Huang Shao, and He Man. He Yi led the remaining forces in surrendering to Cao Cao.

Other Yellow Turban forces in Runan Commandery were led by Wu Ba (吳霸) and Gong Du (龔都). Wu Ba was defeated and captured by the general Li Tong. Gong Du posed a threat to Cao Cao when he allied with Cao Cao's rival, Liu Bei, and seized control of Runan Commandery in 201. Cao Cao first sent Cai Yang (蔡揚) to eliminate them, but after Cai Yang was killed, he personally led his troops to attack and defeat them. Liu Bei fled south to join Liu Biao, while Gong Du and the remaining rebels dispersed.

=== Yang and Jiao provinces ===
Another Yellow Turban remnant force was active in Kuaiji Commandery (around present-day Shaoxing, Zhejiang) until Liu Zan killed its leader Wu Huan (吳桓).

In the 200s, Chen Bai (陳敗) and Wan Cheng (萬秉) started a rebellion in Jiuzhen Commandery (九真郡; present-day Thanh Hóa Province, Vietnam). In 202, they were defeated and captured by Zhu Zhi, the commandery's administrator.

== Aftermath and impact ==
Although the Han armies emerged victorious, the rebellion caused the destruction of major government buildings, deaths of high-ranking officials, and fragmentation of the dynasty's territory. Rebel deaths numbered in the hundreds of thousands, while many non-combatants had been left homeless or destitute by the wars. The heavily weakened Han Dynasty was unable to fully govern, distributing its powers to military commanders and local leaders until its complete collapse by 220 AD.

After Emperor Ling died in 189, a power struggle between his brother-in-law He Jin and the eunuchs culminated in He Jin's assassination on 22 September 189. He Jin's chief ally, Yuan Shao, retaliated by setting the palace on fire and slaughtering the eunuchs. The warlord Dong Zhuo gained control over the underage heir, Liu Bian, to legitimize his occupation and ransacking of the capital. Dong Zhuo's reign of terror that followed kicked off a series of civil wars and the Three Kingdoms period that lasted for nearly a century.

== Involved parties ==
Yellow Turban rebels

- Zhang Jue, overall leader of the rebellion, stationed in Wei and Julu commanderies
  - † Zhang Bao (張寶), Zhang Jue's younger brother
  - † Zhang Liang (張梁), Zhang Jue's younger brother
- (POW) Bu Ji (卜己), leader of the rebels at Cangting
  - † Zhang Bo (張伯)
  - † Liang Zhongning (梁仲寧)
- † Zhang Mancheng (張曼成), leader of the rebels in Nanyang Commandery
  - † Zhao Hong (趙弘)
  - (executed) Han Zhong (韓忠)
- Sun Xia (孫夏)
- Bo Cai (波才), leader of the rebels in Runan and Yingchuan commanderies
  - Peng Tuo (彭脫)
- (executed) Ma Yuanyi (馬元義)
- Tang Zhou (唐周)

Han imperial forces

- Emperor Ling
  - He Jin, General-in-Chief (大將軍)
  - Lu Zhi, North General of the Household (北中郎將)
  - Huangfu Song, Left General of the Household (左中郎將)
    - Fu Xie (傅燮), Major (司馬) (Note: Fu Xie was the paternal grandfather of Fu Xuan.)
  - Zhu Jun, Right General of the Household (右中郎將)
    - Zhang Chao (張超), Major (司馬)
    - Sun Jian, Major (司馬)
  - Dong Zhuo, General of the Household (中郎將)
  - Cao Cao, Cavalry Commandant (騎都尉)
  - Bao Hong (鮑鴻), Colonel (校尉)
- Guo Dian (郭典), Administrator of Julu Commandery
- Xu Qiu (徐璆), Inspector of Jing Province
  - † Chu Gong (褚貢), Administrator of Nanyang Commandery
  - Qin Jie (秦頡), Administrator of Nanyang Commandery
- Tao Qian, Inspector of Xu Province
  - Zang Ba, Cavalry Commandant (騎都尉).
- Yang Xu (羊續), Administrator of Lujiang Commandery (Note: Yang Xu was also the paternal grandfather of Yang Hu and Yang Huiyu.)
- † Guo Xun (郭勳), Inspector of You Province
  - † Liu Wei (劉衛), Administrator of Guangyang Commandery
- Zou Jing, Colonel (校尉)
  - Liu Bei
- Wang Yun, Inspector of Yu Province
  - Zhao Qian (趙謙), Administrator of Runan Commandery (汝南郡)
    - † Yuan Mi (袁祕), yisheng (議生; scholar)
    - † Feng Guan (封觀), Officer of Merit (功曹)
    - † Chen Duan (陳端), Registrar (主簿)
    - † Fan Zhongli (范仲禮), a menxiadu (門下督; patrol officer)
    - † Liu Weide (劉偉德), zeicao (賊曹; law enforcement officer)
    - † Ding Zisi (丁子嗣), zhujishi (主記史; historian)
    - † Zhang Zhongran (張仲然), a jishishi (記室史; scribe/note-taker)
  - Liu Chong (劉寵), Prince of Chen

=== Resurgent Yellow Turban rebels ===
- † Ma Xiang (馬相), started a rebellion in Yi Province in 188
  - Zhao Zhi (趙祗)
- Zhang Rao (張饒), attacked and defeated Kong Rong in Qing Province around 189
- Guan Hai (管亥), attacked and besieged Kong Rong in Duchang County around 189 or 190, but was defeated by Liu Bei
- † Wu Huan (吳桓), active in Kuaiji Commandery
- (surrendered) He Yi (何儀), led rebels in the 190s in Runan Commandery
  - † Liu Pi (劉辟)
  - † Huang Shao (黃邵)
  - † He Man (何曼)
- Gong Du (共都/龔都), active in Runan Commandery, allied with Liu Bei in 201
- (POW) Wu Ba (吳霸), active in Runan Commandery
- † Xu He (徐和), led rebels in the 200s in Jinan Commandery
- † Sima Ju (司馬俱), led rebels in the 200s in Le'an Commandery
- (POW) Chen Bai (陳敗), led rebels in the 200s in Jiuzhen Commandery
  - (POW) Wan Bing (萬秉)
- White Wave Bandits
  - Guo Tai (郭太), started a rebellion in 188 in Xihe Commandery. This group of rebels became the White Wave Bandits
  - Yang Feng, became a subordinate of Li Jue. He protected Emperor Xian from Li Jue and Guo Si in 195
  - Li Le (李樂), along with Han Xian, Hu Cai and others, came to Emperor Xian's defence in Luoyang in 195
  - Han Xian
  - Hu Cai (胡才)

== In Romance of the Three Kingdoms ==
The rebellion is portrayed in the opening chapters of the 14th-century historical novel Romance of the Three Kingdoms, which portrays the Zhang brothers as sorcerers, having been provided the Taiping Jing from the "old immortal spirit from the southern lands" (sometimes identified as Zhuangzi).

Many fictional Yellow Turban figures were created for the novel, including:

- Du Yuan, killed by Liao Hua for kidnapping Liu Bei's wives
- Zhou Cang, Guan Yu's rebel-turned-weapon bearer
- Gao Sheng, a subordinate of Zhang Bao
- Cheng Yuanzhi, defeated by Liu Bei's forces in their first engagement
- Deng Mao, Cheng Yuanzhi's champion
- Bian Xi, an eventual servant of Cao Cao who tried and failed to kill Guan Yu

Though not a fictional character, Liao Hua was presented in the novel as having been a Yellow Turban rebel in his earlier days, which is historically unlikely, given his date of death and predicted lifespan.

== In popular culture ==
The rebellion appears as an early stage in each iteration of Koei's Dynasty Warriors video game franchise, remaining largely unchanged throughout the series. In Team Ninja's historical fantasy Action RPG Wo Long: Fallen Dynasty, the unnamed player character fights against the rebellion in the first four levels of the game. He Yi, Gong Du, and Huang Shao lead playable factions in the Yellow Turban DLC of the turn-based strategy video game Total War: Three Kingdoms, while the Mandate of Heaven DLC features Zhang Jue, Zhang Bao, and Zhang Liang.
