= Fu Wuji =

2nd-century Eastern Han dynasty scholar

Fu Wuji (Chinese: 伏無忌, fl. 136–152) was an Eastern Han dynasty scholar. He is known for his Fuhou gujin zhu, an important historical encyclopedia, and his work on the Dongguan Hanji, the standard history of the Eastern Han until it was replaced by the Book of the Later Han.

== Life ==
Fu Wuji was born in Dongwu, Langya Commandery (modern-day Zhucheng, Shandong). His father, Fu Chen, was recorded to be a "scholarly, generous man" and had married the Princess of Gaoyang. He came from a prominent family of scholars that claimed descent from the Qin and early Han scholar Fu Sheng. His great-great-grandfather Fu Zhan was an advisor to the Eastern Han founder Emperor Guangwu and had been made marquis of Buji (不其侯), with a fief of 3600 households. After his father's death, Fu Wuji inherited his title of marquis. Thus, Fu Wuji is often referred to as Marquis Fu (伏侯 Fu hou).

During the reign of Emperor Shun (126–144), he was made palace attendant and the commandant of garrison cavalry (屯騎校尉, tunqi jiaowei) and in 136 he was commissioned with Huang Jing (黃景) to edit the imperial collections of Confucian classics and philosophical writings as well as works on art, calligraphy, mathematics, archery, chariot-driving, medicine, and divination. Nothing else is recorded about the project, suggesting that it involved cataloging rather than detailed copy-editing.

During the era of Yuanjia (151–153), Fu Wuji, Huang Jing, Cui Shi, and others were called to work on the third expansion of the Han ji (漢記, lit. 'Records of Han'), which would later be known as the Dongguan Hanji. They worked on the Tables of kings, sons of kings, eminent statesmen and generals, and marquises not of royal descent and the biographies of the leaders of the southern branch of the Xiongnu and the Qiang. Fu Wuji and Huang Jing also worked on a Treatise on Geography (地理志, dili zhi). (Note: The Shitong states that at an unspecified time Fu Wuji and Huang Jing compiled the Tables and Biographies as well as the Treatise on Geography. Some have interpreted this as meaning that this expansion of the Han ji included the Treatise, but Mansvelt Beck 1990 believes that the Shitong description does not warrant this.)

After his death, his son Fu Zhi (伏質) succeeded him as marquis. Fu Zhi would serve as Minister of Finance under Emperor Huan or Ling.

== Fuhou gujin zhu ==
Fu Wuji is most known for his Fuhou gujin zhu (伏侯古今注, lit. 'Notes of the Marquis Fu on Things Ancient and Modern') or simply Gujin zhu (古今注). It was a historical encyclopedia covering the time from the Yellow Emperor to 146 CE. It included information on a diverse range of topics, including astrological signs, terrestrial portents, population figures, the tabooed personal names of emperors, the dimensions of imperial tombs, official salaries, and the currency of the Qin dynasty. It is now lost apart from quotations.

The Book of Sui and Li Xian's Tang dynasty commentary to the Book of the Later Han both record the Fuhou gujin zhu as having 8 juan (volumes). The Old Book of Tang also lists the text as having 8 juan, indicating that the text was able to survive the Five Dynasties and Ten Kingdoms period. The Southern Song period encyclopedia Tongzhi lists the text as only having 3 juan. It was lost thereafter.

The Fuhou gujin zhu is quoted nearly 220 times in the commentary to the Book of the Later Han. In particular, Liang dynasty scholar Liu Zhao heavily quotes the Fuhou gujin zhu in his commentary to the Treatise on the Heavens (天文志) in the Book of the Later Han, as Sima Biao missed many astronomical signs: in total, Liu Zhao added 90 signs to the 139 listed in the treatise.

Several Qing dynasty scholars have reconstructed the text of the Fuhou gujin zhu from quotations preserved in extant texts, including Mao Panlin, whose reconstruction can be found in several of his works; Ma Guohan in his Yuhan shanfang jiyi shu (玉函山房輯佚書); Huang Shi in his Huangshi yishu kao (黄氏逸书考) and Han xuetang congshu (漢學堂叢書); Gu Huaisan (顧櫰三) in his Bu hou hanshu yiwen zhi (補后漢書藝文志); and Tang Qiu, whose reconstruction is now lost.
