= Taipingjing =

Name of several different Taoist texts

- Traditional Chinese: 太平經
- Simplified Chinese: 太平经
- Hanyu Pinyin: Tàipíng Jīng
Transcriptions
Standard Mandarin
- Hanyu Pinyin: Tàipíng Jīng
- Wade–Giles: Tai P'ing Ching

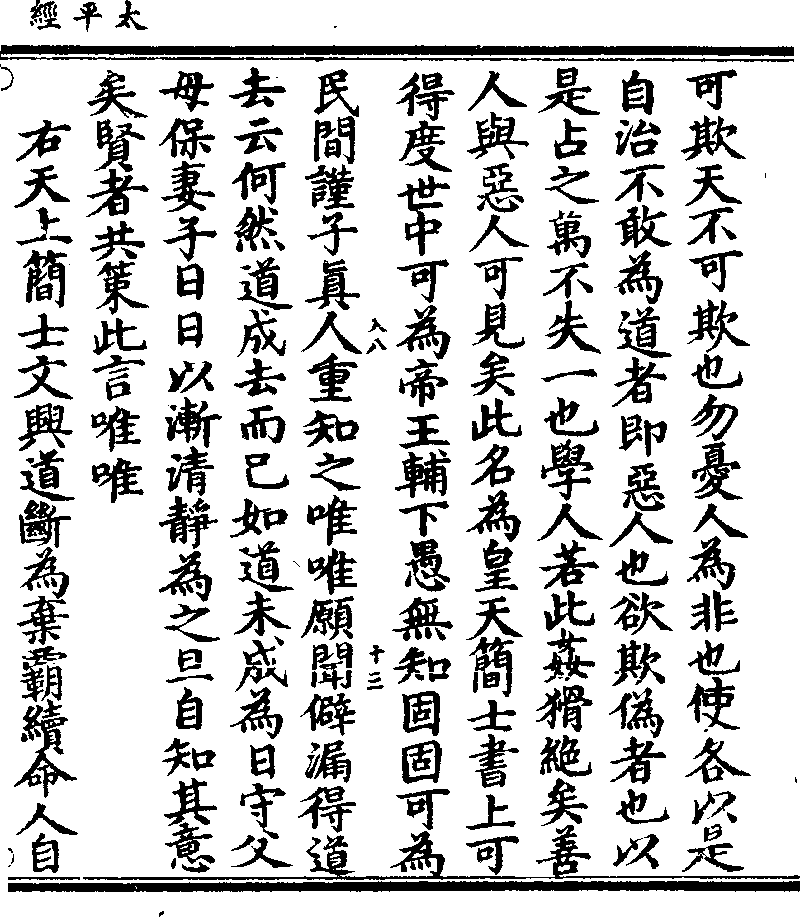
Daozang edition of Taipingjing

Taipingjing ("Scriptures of the Great Peace") is the name of several different Taoist texts. At least two works were known by this title:

- Chinese: 天官歷包元太平經; pinyin: Tiānguān lì Bāoyuán Tàipíng jīng, 12 Chapters, contents unknown, author: Gan Zhongke 甘忠可
- Chinese: 太平清領書; pinyin: Tàipíng Qīnglǐng Shū, 170 Chapters, only 57 of which survive via the Daozang, author: unknown

Taipingjing usually refers to the work which has been preserved in the Daozang. It is considered to be a valuable resource for researching early Taoist beliefs and the society at the end of the Eastern Han dynasty. Zhang Jue (d. 184), the leader of the Yellow Turban Rebellion, taught "Taiping Taoism" (太平道) based on this work.

The contents of the Taipingjing are diverse but it primarily deals with subjects such as heaven and earth, the five elements, yin and yang and the sexagenary cycle.

== Fundamental concepts in the Taipingjing ==
The Taipingjing is a guide that reveals the proper methods to bring forward an era of great peace or equality, the "Great Peace", an idea which probably dates back to the Warring States period. The idea of the "Great Peace" became more prominent during the Han period. The main idea brought forward by the scriptures is that the world is in a terrible state of chaos. There is a loss of cosmic balance, and this is made obvious by omens such as droughts, floods, famines, epidemics and other natural disasters. There is also chaos in the courts of the imperial house, proven by recorded events such as freakish births (perhaps a hint at the meddling of eunuchs), all of which demonstrate Heaven's displeasure towards the mortal realm. Humans have been polluted by their sins and their ancestors' sins (evil accumulated through many generations). The Universe reciprocates the mortal realm's condition; for there to be balance again, the people must heal themselves and cultivate their inner Dao. Salvation lies in the hand of great princes known as Celestial Masters. Chinese antiquity was divided into three eras: High Antiquity, Middle Antiquity and Late Antiquity, but it was only High Antiquity that contained a time of Great Peace, maintained with the collaborative efforts of the rulers of that era and the Celestial Masters. There was no infant mortality, no bad harvests and the climate was convenient. This balance was so delicate that the suffering of one entity was enough to make things out of synch. The Taipingjing claimed that a better era than the one experienced by the Han dynasty can only begin with the emergence of a new healthy emperor, a new Heavenly Mandate and an end to evil omens.

== The Taipingjing in the Han dynasty ==
There are two known versions of the Taipingjing that emerged during the Han dynasty. The first one was presented to Emperor Cheng of Han (32–7 BCE) under the title Tianguan li baoyuan Taiping jing. It was written in this book that the House of Han was nearing the end of its cosmological cycle and that a new mandate was about to be presented to restore the dynasty. The book decrees that a man by the name of Chijing zi would bring and teach the ways of the Dao to the emperor. Emperor Shun of Han (126–145 CE) also received similar scriptures called Taiping Qingling Shu, which would later be used by Zhang Jue, the leader of the Yellow Turban Rebellion. Xiang Zheng's memorial states that it was based on respect between Heaven and Earth and conformity with the Five Elements. Another version was called the Taiping Dongji jing and was supposedly introduced to the Celestial Master by Taishang Laojun.

== The Wang Ming edition ==
There was no definitive modern edition of the Taipingjing until 1960, when Wang Ming published the Taipingjing Hejiao. The Taiping Jing once contained 170 chapters divided into 10 parts (each containing 17 chapters). Each "part" is labelled by the ten Celestial Stems. However. the first two parts (37 chapters) and the last three parts (the last 51 chapters) are missing in Ming's modern edition. So, in actuality, only five parts remain, and of these parts, certain chapters have not been accounted for. Ming's edition also includes "Magic Texts" (divided into four chapters and 2133 magic characters) and some images. Some chapters follow the form of a dialogue between the Heavenly Teacher and the six zhenren, while others stick to the essay format, containing methods, instructions or notes. Perhaps the Taipingjing had many authors, hence the various writing styles in the chapters.
