= Huangfu Song =

Chinese Han dynasty general (died 195)

- 皇甫嵩

Minister of Ceremonies (太常)
- In office 192 – 195
- Monarch: Emperor Xian of Han

Grand Commandant (太尉)
- In office 192
- Monarch: Emperor Xian of Han

General of Chariots and Cavalry (車騎將軍)
- In office 192
- Monarch: Emperor Xian of Han

General of the Left (左將軍)
- In office 187 – 189
- Monarchs: Emperor Ling of Han / Emperor Xian of Han

Personal details
- Born: Unknown Pengyang County, Ningxia
- Died: 195
- Children: Huangfu Jianshou; Huangfu Shuxian; She Yuan's wife
- Parent: Huangfu Jie (father)
- Occupation: General
- Courtesy name: Yizhen (義真)
- Peerage: Marquis of a Chief District (都鄉侯)

Huangfu Song (Note: Chinese: 皇甫嵩; pronounced [xuǎŋfùsʊ́ŋ] in Mandarin) (died c. April 195 (Note: Volume 61 of Zizhi Tongjian recorded that Li Jue and Guo Si took their respective hostages on the bingyin day of the 3rd month of the 2nd year of the Xingping era of Liu Xie's reign. This corresponds to 22 Apr 195 on the Julian calendar. As this event marks the beginning of the civil war between Li Jue and Guo Si, Huangfu Song probably died in April 195.)), courtesy name Yizhen, was a military general who lived during the Eastern Han dynasty of China. He is known for the suppression of the Yellow Turban Rebellion and Liang Province rebellion.

He was one of three imperial commanders when the Yellow Turban Rebellion broke out, along with Zhu Jun and Lu Zhi. He was known to be a modest and generous person. Lu Zhi was removed from command after the eunuch Zuo Feng made false accusations against him; Lu Zhi had refused to bribe Zuo Feng. Huangfu Song, who took over command of the imperial troops from Lu Zhi, continued to use Lu as a strategist and reported his contributions to the imperial court. Thus, in the same year, Lu Zhi regained his post as Master of Writing (尚书).

== Life ==
Huangfu Song was a nephew of Huangfu Gui (皇甫規; 104-174), a military general, (Note: Eventually, Huangfu Gui became famous in the capital Luoyang. As his courtesy name had the character "ming", along with the courtesy names of Zhang Huan and Duan Jiong, the three became known as the "Three Mings of Liang Province".) and Lady Huangfu. His father Huangfu Jie (Huangfu Gui's elder brother) was the Administrator of Yanmen Commandery. His grandfather Huangfu Qi (皇甫旗) and great-grandfather Huangfu Ling (皇甫棱; one of his known positions was General who Crosses the Liao (River)) were also military officials serving the Eastern Han.

Since young, he was well versed with the Classic of History and the Poetry and also known as his masteries in archery and horsemanship. Nominated into the title of Filial and Incorrupt, he serves as a magistrate in Jingzhao and Hedong, but resigned after his father died. Later, Huangfu Song was eventually nominated by his province's Office as a xiaolian and maocai. However, Huangfu Song also refused those offers to join the office of the Grand Tutor Chen Fan and the General-in-Chief Dou Wu. Only after Emperor Ling of Han personally sent an invitation and sent a special carriage, that Huangfu Song accepted to become Administrator of Beidi in 180.

=== Yellow Turban Rebellion ===
During the Yellow Turban rebellion, Huangfu was initially sent to defeat the Yellow Turban rebels in Yingchuan Commandery, along with Zhu Jun. Zhu Jun first engaged the Yellow Turban rebels under Bo Cai but was defeated. Huangfu Song was forced to retreat to Changsha (Note: northeast of present-day Changge County, Henan Province), where Bo Cai led his troops to besiege the city. The city was short of soldiers and the disparity in numbers terrified the troops. Huangfu Song consoled his men. Later, a strong wind arose that night. Huangfu Song ordered his men to assemble torches and climb the city walls. He first sent elite troops outside the encirclement, setting fires and shouting loudly. Then, torches were lit on the city walls to echo the shouts. Huangfu Song, taking advantage of this momentum, beat drums and charged out. The Yellow Turbans, inexperienced in combat, panicked and scattered, forcing them to retreat. At this time, Cao Cao , the cavalry commander, also arrived on orders. Huangfu Song, Cao Cao, and Zhu Jun joined forces to fight again, defeating the Yellow Turban Army and killed tens of thousands of them. For this achievement, Huangfu Song was granted the title of Marquis of Duxiang.

Huangfu Song and Zhu Jun then took advantage of the victory to suppress the Yellow Turban Rebellion in Runan and Chen Commanderies, pursued Bo Cai, and attacked Peng Tuo. The Yellow Turban Rebellion either surrendered or dispersed, and the three counties were completely pacified.

In August, Huangfu Song defeated the Yellow Turban Bu Yi's army at Cangting, captured Bu Yi, and beheaded over 7,000 (Note: Some sources recorded a figure of over 10,000.). At this time, Zhang Jue occupied Guangzong and controlled the heartland of Hebei. Lu Zhi had previously been falsely accused by eunuchs of going on an expedition and was recalled, with his death sentence commuted. His successor, Dong Zhuo, was also recalled due to his failure in suppressing the Yellow Turbans, and his death sentence was commuted. The court then issued an edict ordering Huangfu Song to lead his troops to attack. Soon, Huangfu Song forces defeated the forces of Zhang Liang, brother of Zhang Jue, in seven consecutive clashes. By the last attack during dusk at Guangzong County (廣宗縣; southeast of present-day Guangzong County, Hebei), Huangfu Song managed to kill Liang, and killed 30,000 Yellow Turban rebels. Another 50,000 rebels dies after this battle after they jumped into the river. Huangfu Song also captured large number of the rebels, along with their wives and children.

In November, Huangfu Song and Julu prefect Guo Dian captured Xiaquyang (now northwest of Jinxian County , Hebei Province), killed Zhang Jue's other brother Zhang Bao, and captured and killed more than 100,000 rebels. Huangfu Song built a Jingguan (a memorial hall) with the remains of 100,000 people in the south of the city. The court appointed Huangfu Song as the General of the Left Cavalry and the Governor of Jizhou and promoted him to the Marquis of Huaili, with the tax revenue from Huaili and Meiyang counties, and a fief of 8,000 household. (Another chapter in the Book of Han says that Huangfu Song served as the General of the Cavalry after the great defeat of Zhang Liang

After the quelling of the Yellow Turban rebellion, Emperor Ling changed the era name to Zhongping. Huangfu Song recommended that one year's worth of taxes from Ji province be used as assistance for refugees who had been displaced by the rebellion; Emperor Ling agreed. The people chanted, "[The] Tianxia is in chaos; cities become rubble. Mothers cannot protect their children, while wives lose their husbands. It is because of Huangfu that we are able to live in peace."

=== Liang Province rebellion ===
After the suppression of the Yellow Turban rebellion, a former official from Xindu (信都), Yan Zhong (阎忠), advised Huangfu to rebel in order to protect himself, lest he end up like Han Xin. Huangfu refused, and Yan left Huangfu. (Note: This anecdote was also recorded in Jiuzhou Chunqiu. Pei Songzhi included this anecdote in his annotation of Jia Xu's biography in Sanguozhi as Yan Zhong had been one of the few people (if not the only one) who saw Jia's talent in his youth and compared Jia to Zhang Liang and Chen Ping. An Yingxiong Ji annotation in the same biography also recorded that Yan Zhong died of illness after he was abducted by Wang Guo and forced to become the rebels' leader.. Dong Zhuo's biography in Book of the Later Han also recorded Yan's death.) Tse Wai Kit Wicky, an Associate Professor at the Chinese University of Hong Kong, explained the reason why Huangfu Song refused to revolt despite recognizing the deterioration of the Han empire was possibly due to his family background and education as a staunch Confucianist who was raised in Guandong, which was heavily influenced by scholar-official culture. Besides, Huangfu Song's uncle Huangfu Gui also made a great effort to be recognized by the eastern scholar-officials. This is a contrast with Yan Zhong, whose background as a northwestern elite makes him not feel too attached to the central government.

In the spring of 185, Beigong Boyu (Note: a chieftain of Yicong hu, (義從胡; lit. "Loyal Nomad Auxiliary") a subtribe branch from a lesser cadet tribe of Yuezhi) rebelled. He killed Leng Zheng (冷徵), administrator of the Qiang tribe, and supported Bian Zhang and Han Sui from Jincheng as their leaders while also killing Chen Yi, the governor of Jincheng. This all occurred at the same time as Huangfu Song was still busy with suppressing the Yellow Turban rebellions.

During the rebellion, while passing through Ye, Huangfu noticed that the residence of eunuch Zhao Zhong (赵忠; one of the Ten Attendants) was more grand than what his rank or title entitled him to. When Huangfu reported this to the imperial court, Zhao's residence was confiscated.

In response to the rebellion in Longyou by Beigong Boyu, Bian Zhang, and Han Sui, Huangfu Song moved to Chang'an (present-day Xi'an , Shaanxi ) to guard the imperial mausoleum. Xie Cheng's "Book of the Later Han" records that Huangfu Song was appointed General of Chariots and Cavalry, and went to suppress the Qiang and Hu people in Pingliang. He selected generals and soldiers, and led 10,000 cavalry and 3,000 chariots. The ministers and officials all came to see him off at Pingle Temple and held a meeting. He wiped out the Qiang bandits, and left no one alive. He finally restored the two states and presented his victory to boost the army. Later, Huangfu Song fought against Beigong Boyu and his group, who had invaded the Three Prefectural Regions, to a stalemate; he was unable to pacify the rebellion. Furthermore, because he had offended the eunuchs Zhao Zhong and Zhang Rang during the Yellow Turban Rebellion, they reported him as having failed to immediately subdue the rebels. After a four-month tenure, in the seventh lunar month of 185, Huangfu Song was dismissed, his seal and ribbon as the Left General of Chariots and Cavalry was revoked, and his fiefdom was reduced by 6,000 households.

In November of 188 AD, the Liang rebel leader Wang Guo surrounded Chencang (Note: now east of Baoji, Shaanxi). At this time, Emperor Ling of Han appointed Huangfu Song as the Left General and commanded the Front General Dong Zhuo, each leading 20,000 soldiers to resist the enemy. In December, the two were stationed in Youfufeng. Chencang had been besieged by Wang Guo (王国). In the process, Dong had several tactical and strategic disagreements with Huangfu; after Huangfu managed to achieve victory despite Dong's disagreements (resulting in Wang Guo's death), Dong became resentful and fearful of Huangfu Song. According to Rafe de Crespigny, Huangfu Song attracted Dong Zhuo's jealousy when the two reached Chencang to aid the besieged city. Dong Zhuo urged to relief the siege immediately, whereas Huangfu Song instead opted to wait the siege out, being confident in Chencang's strong defenses. As Wang Guo's forces indeed abandoned the siege in the Spring 189 after supplies and morale dwindled like Huangfu Song predicted, both imperial generals once again differed in opinion about what to do. Huangfu Song saw this as an opportunity to pursue the weary enemies as they were now too tired to fight after long siege, but Dong Zhuo objected on the basis that according to the rule of war, it is not recommended to chase the retreating enemies as they might resort to counter attack. Huangfu Song did not follow his suggestion and immediately led his men to attack without Dong Zhuo and achieved a great victory, kiling more than 10,000 rebels.

=== Rise of Dong Zhuo ===
In 189, Dong Zhuo was made Governor of Bing Province, and was asked to hand troops under his command to Huangfu Song; Dong refused to comply. At the time, Huangfu Song's nephew Huangfu Li (皇甫郦) advised him, "The dynasty has lost its ability to govern and the Tianxia is hanging by a thread. Only Your Excellency (Huangfu Song) and Dong Zhuo can bring stability to the realm. Now, there is bad blood between the two of you, with no possibility of co-existence. Dong Zhuo is resisting orders by refusing to hand over his troops. He is harbouring wickedness by delaying his advance and claiming that there is chaos in the capital. As he is brutal and heartless, his troops are not loyal to him. Your Excellency, as grand marshal, should attack Dong Zhuo. In this way, you can show your loyalty and righteousness, as well as remove a great threat to the state. This was what Duke Huan of Qi and Duke Wen of Jin did in the past." Huangfu Song replied, "Although it is a crime to disobey orders, it is also wrong to kill someone arbitrarily. Let us report this to the imperial court and let the court decide." After Huangfu's report reached Emperor Xian, the young emperor showed it to Dong Zhuo, increasing his resentment of Huangfu.

In 190, (Note: 1st year of the Chuping era) Dong Zhuo, now in control of the imperial court, intended to kill Huangfu Song, using the pretext of giving him a new appointment to summon him to Luoyang. As Huangfu was about to depart, Liang Yan (梁衍) advised him, "Now, the Han dynasty is weak and eunuchs had caused chaos in court. Although Dong Zhuo has killed them, he is not loyal to the state. He has pillaged the capital, and deposed and crowned emperors at will. Today, he has summoned Your Excellency. In the worst case scenario, Your Excellency will be in great peril. At the very least, Your Excellency will be trapped and humiliated. Now, Dong Zhuo is at Luoyang, while the emperor is in the west. Your Excellency should use 30,000 elite troops to welcome the emperor, while declaring your intent to attack Dong Zhuo. You should then spread this intent throughout the country, and recruit troops and officers. With the Yuans closing in from his east and Your Excellency closing in from his west, Dong Zhuo can be captured." Huangfu ignored Liang Yan's advice and continued his journey to Luoyang. During this time, Dong Zhuo courted Huangfu Song's aunt, Lady Ma of Fufeng. He was delighted with her beauty and intelligence for working at Han court, so he forced her to marry him. Lady Huangfu refused and confronted him, then Dong Zhuo had her executed.

Huangfu Song's son Huangfu Jianshou was on good terms with Dong Zhuo. After knowing of Dong Zhuo's plans for his father, Jianshou hurried from Chang'an to Luoyang to meet Dong; Dong set a banquet to welcome him. Jianshou gave an emotional speech at the banquet, moving those present; even Dong Zhuo stood up, took Jianshou's hand and had Jianshou sit by his side. Huangfu Song's son, Huangfu Jianshou, was a friend of Dong Zhuo and fled from Chang'an to Luoyang to join Dong Zhuo. Dong Zhuo was preparing a banquet to welcome his guests when Huangfu Jianshou rushed forward to argue with him, urging him to uphold justice, and kowtowed in tears. The guests were deeply moved and pleaded for Huangfu Song. Dong Zhuo then left the table, pulled Huangfu Jianshou to sit with him, and sent someone to release Huangfu Song and appointed him to the position of Chief Censor.

=== After Dong Zhuo's death ===
After Dong Zhuo's death, Huangfu Song was tasked to attack Dong's fortress at Meiwu; Dong's brother Dong Min, their relatives and clansmen who were at Meiwu were slaughtered. In August, Huangfu Song was appointed Grand Marshal due to Li Jue's efforts. Huangfu was then made Grand Commandant in c.September 192, but was relieved of the position c.February 193; he was replaced by Zhou Zhong (周忠), an uncle of Zhou Yu. (Note: According to Liu Xie's biography in Book of the Later Han, Huangfu Song was made Grand Commandant in the 8th month of the 3rd year of the Chuping era of his reign, and was relieved of the post in the 12th month of the same year. The two months correspond to 26 Aug to 24 Sep 192 and 21 Jan to 18 Feb 193 in the Julian calendar.)

In 195, Huangfu Song died of illness. The court bestowed upon him the seal and ribbon of General of the Cavalry and appointed one of his family members as a palace attendant.

== Children and descendants ==
Huangfu Song was recorded to have at least 2 sons: Huangfu Jianshou and Huangfu Shuxian. Huangfu Shuxian is the paternal grandfather of Huangfu Mi. He also had a daughter who later became She Yuan's wife.

== In Romance of the Three Kingdoms ==
In the 14th-century historical novel Romance of the Three Kingdoms, Huangfu Song was involved in Wang Yun's plot in getting rid of Dong Zhuo, and led the imperial forces to capture Dong Zhuo's family members and remnants in the capital.

== See also ==
- Lists of people of the Three Kingdoms

== Appendix ==
=== Bibliography ===
- de Crespigny, Rafe (2003) [1989]. "Emperor Huan and Emperor Ling: being the Chronicle of the Later Han dynasty for the years 157 to 189 AD as recorded in Chapters 54 to 59 of the Zizhi tongjian of Sima Guang". Canberra: Faculty of Asian Studies, The Australian National University. ISBN 0-7315-0655-3. Archived from the original on 4 February 2012.
- de Crespigny, Rafe (2006). A Biographical Dictionary of Later Han to the Three Kingdoms (23-220 AD). Brill. ISBN 9789047411840.
- Fan, Ye (5th century). Book of the Later Han (Houhanshu).
- Luo, Guanzhong (14th century). Romance of the Three Kingdoms (Sanguo Yanyi).
