= Chang Xi (Han dynasty) =

Late Eastern Han rebel leader executed by Yu Jin in 206

- 昌豨
- Born: 2nd century
- Died: 206 CE
- Relatives: Zang Ba (former chief) · Yu Jin (old friend, executor)
- Military career
- Allegiance: Taishan Bandits (–199); Liu Bei (199–201); Cao Cao (201–206) – intermittent
- Commands: Garrisons in Donghai Commandery (東海郡)
- Conflicts: Raids in Xiapi & Donghai (200) · Siege by Zhang Liao (201) · Rebellion of 206

Chang Xi
- Traditional Chinese: 昌豨
- Simplified Chinese: 昌豨
Transcriptions
Standard Mandarin
- Hanyu Pinyin: Chāng Xī

Chang Xi (Chinese: 昌豨; pinyin: Chāng Xī; died 206 CE), also recorded as Chang Ba (昌霸) (Note: This name was recorded in Liu Bei's biography in Sanguozhi. In his annotation to Zizhi Tongjian, Hu Sanxing wrote that Chang Ba and Chang Xi were the same person.) or Chang Wu (昌務), was a bandit leader during the late Eastern Han period. He initially allied himself with Lü Bu, though later surrendered to Cao Cao. In 199 CE, he rebelled against Cao Cao and allied with Liu Bei. In 201 CE he surrendered to Xiahou Yuan and submitted once more to Cao Cao. However, he rebelled against Cao Cao again in 206 CE. Cao Cao sent Yu Jin to quell the rebellion, which he accomplished after a short siege. As Chang Xi was an old acquaintance of Yu Jin, some officers proposed that Chang be spared. Yu Jin reminded them of Cao Cao's rule which stated that no enemies were to be spared if they surrendered only after being surrounded. Therefore, Chang Xi was executed.
