= Lu Zhi (Han dynasty) =

Chinese scholar, official and general (140s?–192)

- 盧植
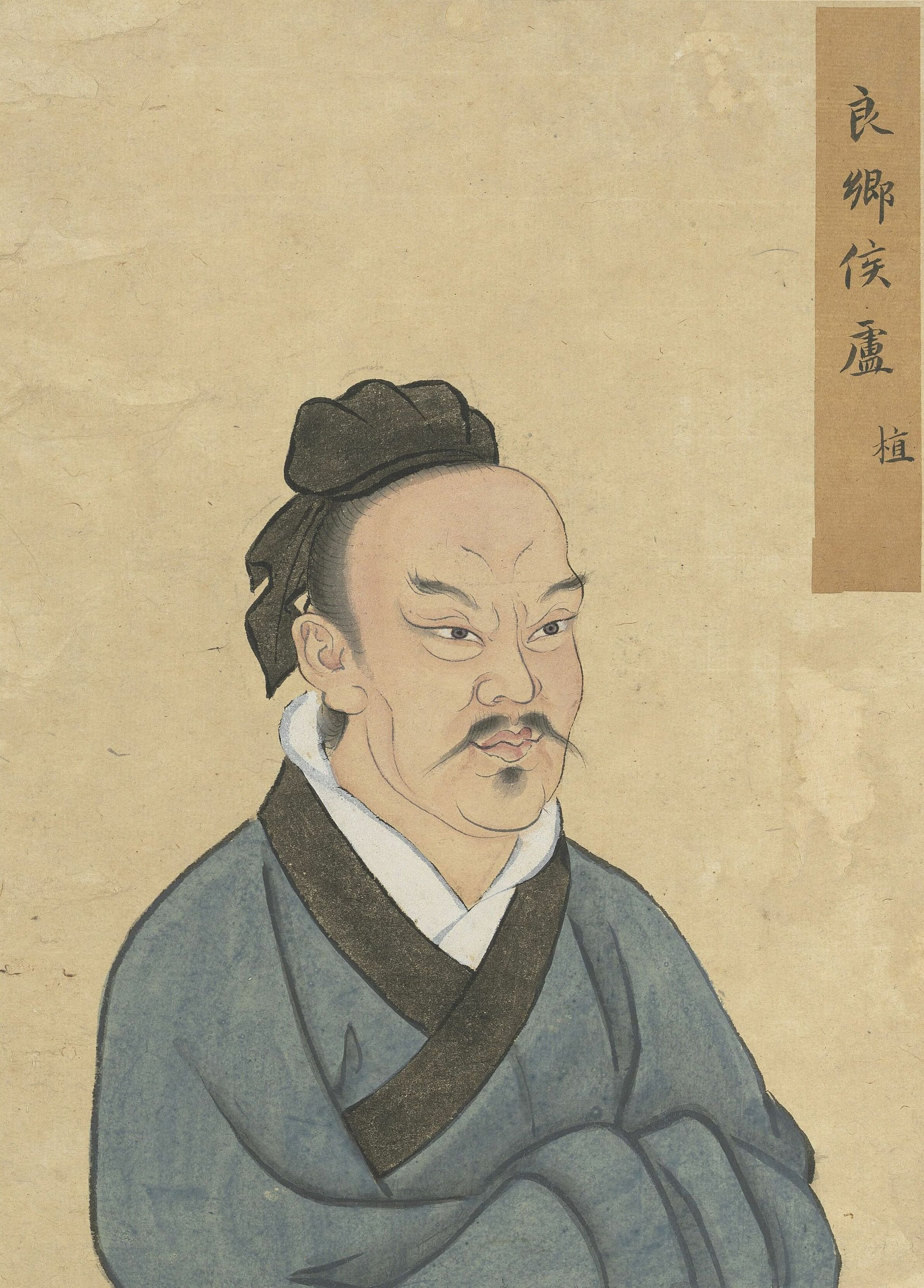

Master of Writing (尚書)
- In office ? – 189
- Monarch: Emperor Ling of Han

North General of the Household (北中郎將)
- In office 184
- Monarch: Emperor Ling of Han

Consultant (議郎)
- In office ?–?
- Monarch: Emperor Ling of Han

Administrator of Lujiang (廬江太守)
- In office ?–?
- Monarch: Emperor Ling of Han

Administrator of Jiujiang (九江太守)
- In office 175 – ?
- Monarch: Emperor Ling of Han

Academician (博士)
- In office ?–?
- Monarch: Emperor Ling of Han

Personal details
- Born: 140s? Zhuozhou, Hebei
- Died: 192
- Children: Lu Yu (卢毓; youngest son); three other sons
- Relatives: see Lu clan of Fanyang; Lu Qin (卢钦) (grandson; son of Lu Yu); Lu Ting (卢珽) (grandson; younger brother of Lu Qin)
- Occupation: Historian, military general, philosopher, politician
- Courtesy name: Zigan (子幹)

Lu Zhi (before late 140s? (Note: The earliest record on Lu Zhi's life which can be dated was that as a civilian, he wrote to Dou Wu, advising him not to accept the titles given to him and his family for his role in crowning Emperor Ling; Dou rejected the advice. Volume 56 of Zizhi Tongjian dated the day the Dous received their titles to the guisi day of the 6th month of the 1st year of the Jianning era of Emperor Ling's reign, which corresponds to 8 August 168 in the Julian calendar. In addition, his teacher Ma Rong died in 166. If Lu Zhi was born in 159, he would have been 9 years old at the time he sent the letter to Dou Wu, and 7 when Ma Rong died. Lu Zhi's biography recorded that he was a civilian (布衣) when he sent his letter to Dou Wu. Thus, he should be an adult (i.e. at least in his early 20s). Thus, it is more likely that Lu Zhi's birth year is in the late 140s or earlier.)–192), courtesy name Zigan, was a Chinese historian, military general, philosopher, and politician during the Eastern Han dynasty. According to the Records of the Three Kingdoms, he was the mentor of Liu Bei and Gongsun Zan. He was described as a tall man (approximately 1.89 metres or 6'2") with a sonorous voice.

== Life ==
Lu Zhi was born in Zhuo Commandery (涿郡, Zhuōjùn; present-day Zhuozhou, Hebei). He studied under Ma Rong and Zheng Xuan was one of his classmates. As Ma Rong was a consort kin, (Note: Ma Rong's paternal grandfather Ma Yu was an elder brother of the famed general Ma Yuan, and Ma Yuan's daughter was Emperor Ming's empress.) his family was wealthy and his household had many songstresses and dancers. During his time studying with Ma Rong, Lu Zhi concentrated on his studies and never once looked at the songstresses and dancers, earning his teacher's respect.

In c.August 168, as a civilian, Lu Zhi wrote to Dou Wu, father of the empress dowager Dou Miao, advising him not to accept the titles given to him and his family for his role in crowning Emperor Ling of Han; Dou rejected the advice.

In 175, a rebellion led by "barbarians" in Jiujiang broke out. On account of his literary and martial abilities, Lu Zhi was made Administrator of Jiujiang. The rebels surrendered to Lu peacefully; Lu later resigned, citing an illness.

He was among the most pre-eminent scholars of the era, known for his study of texts on Chinese rituals and his assistance in compiling the Han Records of the Eastern Lodge (t 東觀漢記, s 东观汉记, Dōngguān Hànjì). His students included Gao You, later a scholarly commentator on the Chinese classics; Liu Bei, later the emperor of Shu during the Three Kingdoms; his relative Liu Deran; and Gongsun Zan, later a regional warlord. While in the service of the Han government, Lu Zhi led imperial forces to attack the Yellow Turban rebels in 184, but was removed from command after the eunuch Zuo Feng (左豐) made false accusations against him; Lu Zhi had refused to bribe Zuo Feng.

Huangfu Song, who took over command of the imperial troops from Lu Zhi, continued to use Lu as a strategist and reported his contributions to the imperial court. Thus, in the same year, Lu Zhi regained his post as Master of Writing (尚书). Later, he warned against Dong Zhuo's sudden displacement of Emperor Shao.

After Dong Zhuo's rise to power, Lu eventually resigned from court, citing his old age and ill health. As he feared that he may be harmed, he left the capital via a secluded route. Indeed, Dong Zhuo did send troops after him, but did not manage to capture him. Lu Zhi then became a hermit in Shanggu Commandery, refusing all contact with outsiders, even as Yuan Shao invited him to become an advisor. Lu Zhi then died in 192.

== Family and descendants ==
Lu Zhi's youngest son, Lu Yu (183 - April 257), (Note: Lu Yu's biography in Sanguozhi recorded that he was orphaned when he was 10 (by East Asian reckoning) in 192, when Lu Zhi died. Cao Mao's biography in the same work recorded that Lu Yu died in the 3rd month of the 2nd year of the Gan'lu era; the month corresponds to 2 to 30 Apr 257 in the Julian calendar. Thus, Lu Yu was about 74 when he died.) later served in the state of Cao Wei during the Three Kingdoms period. Lu Yu had 2 sons: Lu Qin (died 24 April 278) and Lu Ting, who both served the Western Jin dynasty. Lu Ting's son Lu Zidao was a general for Sima Ying, one of the princes associated with the War of the Eight Princes. A daughter of Lu Yu married Hua Yi (華廙), (Note: not to be confused with his nephew with a similar-sounding name.) son of Hua Biao (華表), son of Hua Xin. (Note: Hua Yi's biography in vol.44 of Jin Shu recorded that Lu Yu was Hua Yi's father-in-law.)

Lu Zidao's eldest son (Lu Ting's grandson) was Lu Chen (盧諶; 285 - c.April 351). One of Lu Chen's granddaughters was the mother of Northern Wei official Cui Hao. One of Lu Chen's great-grandsons was Lu Xun (盧循; died c.1 June 411), who was the brother-in-law (husband of younger sister) of Jin rebel Sun En, and whom continued Sun's rebellion after his death.

== See also ==
- Lists of people of the Three Kingdoms
