= Guangzong County =

Guangzong County 广宗县
- County
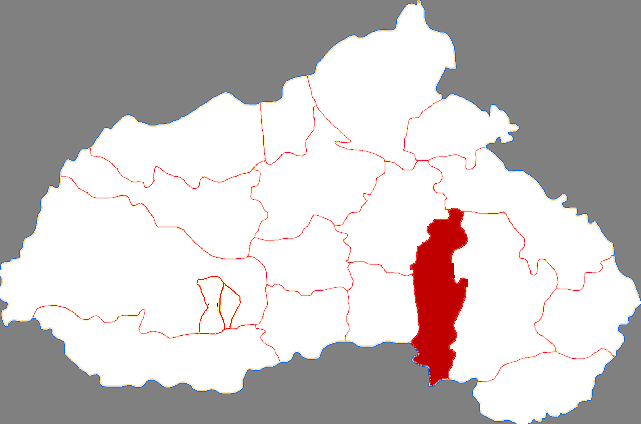
- Guangzong in Xingtai

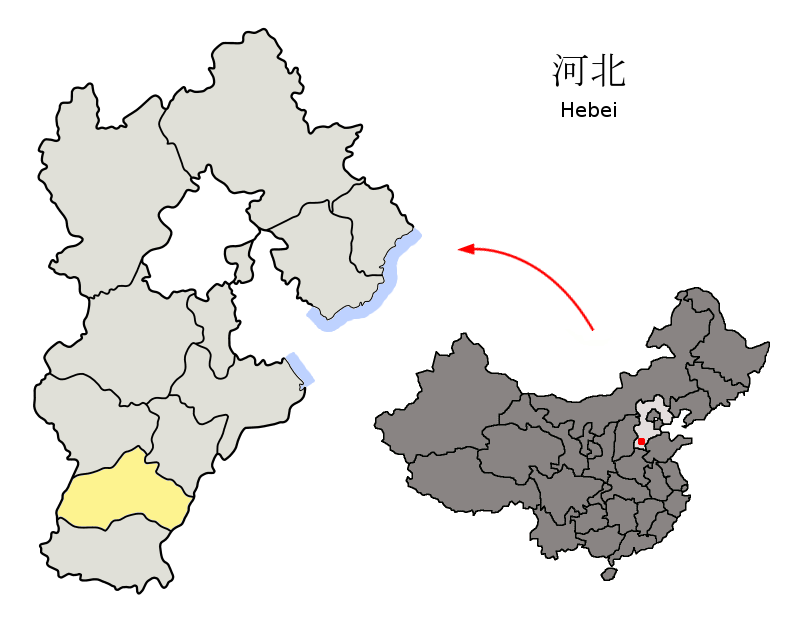
- Xingtai in Hebei
- Coordinates: 37°04′29″N 115°08′33″E
- Country: People's Republic of China
- Province: Hebei
- Prefecture-level city: Xingtai
- County seat: Guangzong Town (广宗镇)

Area
  - Total: 493 km^{2} (190 sq mi)
- Elevation: 34 m (112 ft)

Population
  - Total: 270,000
  - Density: 550/km^{2} (1,400/sq mi)
- Time zone: UTC+8 (China Standard)
- Postal code: 054600
- Division code: GZJ
- Website: www.gzxzf.gov.cn

Guangzong County (simplified Chinese: 广宗县; traditional Chinese: 廣宗縣; pinyin: Guǎngzōng Xiàn) is under the jurisdiction of the prefecture-level city of Xingtai in the south of Hebei province, China. It has a population of 270,000 residing in an area of 493 km^{2} (190 sq mi).

== Administrative divisions ==
The county administers 1 towns and 7 townships.

The only town is Guangzong (广宗镇)

Townships:

- Dapingtai Township (大平台乡), Dongzhao Township (东召乡), Jianzhi Township (件只乡), Hetaoyuan Township (核桃园乡), Hulu Township (葫芦乡), Beitangtuan Township (北塘疃乡), Fengjiazhai Township (冯家寨乡)

== Climate ==
Climate data for Guangzong, elevation 32 m (105 ft), (1991–2020 normals, extremes 1981–2010)
Month	Jan	Feb	Mar	Apr	May	Jun	Jul	Aug	Sep	Oct	Nov	Dec	Year
Record high °C (°F)	18.3 (64.9)	25.3 (77.5)	31.4 (88.5)	36.7 (98.1)	41.2 (106.2)	42.6 (108.7)	40.9 (105.6)	36.8 (98.2)	38.3 (100.9)	32.6 (90.7)	27.3 (81.1)	23.6 (74.5)	42.6 (108.7)
Mean daily maximum °C (°F)	3.8 (38.8)	8.2 (46.8)	15.2 (59.4)	22.2 (72.0)	28.0 (82.4)	32.4 (90.3)	32.3 (90.1)	30.6 (87.1)	27.2 (81.0)	21.3 (70.3)	12.5 (54.5)	5.4 (41.7)	19.9 (67.9)
Daily mean °C (°F)	−2.2 (28.0)	1.8 (35.2)	8.5 (47.3)	15.5 (59.9)	21.5 (70.7)	26.2 (79.2)	27.4 (81.3)	25.8 (78.4)	21.1 (70.0)	14.6 (58.3)	6.2 (43.2)	−0.4 (31.3)	13.8 (56.9)
Mean daily minimum °C (°F)	−6.7 (19.9)	−3.1 (26.4)	2.9 (37.2)	9.5 (49.1)	15.3 (59.5)	20.5 (68.9)	23.1 (73.6)	21.8 (71.2)	16.3 (61.3)	9.3 (48.7)	1.4 (34.5)	−4.6 (23.7)	8.8 (47.8)
Record low °C (°F)	−19.5 (−3.1)	−16.9 (1.6)	−9.0 (15.8)	−2.2 (28.0)	3.4 (38.1)	8.2 (46.8)	16.0 (60.8)	12.9 (55.2)	4.8 (40.6)	−3.0 (26.6)	−15.0 (5.0)	−20.1 (−4.2)	−20.1 (−4.2)
Average precipitation mm (inches)	2.6 (0.10)	6.8 (0.27)	8.7 (0.34)	24.9 (0.98)	41.8 (1.65)	58.9 (2.32)	126.1 (4.96)	105.0 (4.13)	45.5 (1.79)	25.8 (1.02)	14.5 (0.57)	3.4 (0.13)	464 (18.26)
Average precipitation days (≥ 0.1 mm)	1.7	3.1	2.6	5.2	6.6	7.6	10.6	9.4	6.4	5.3	3.8	2.4	64.7
Average snowy days	2.7	3.0	0.9	0.2	0	0	0	0	0	0	0.9	2.5	10.2
Average relative humidity (%)	61	57	53	57	60	61	77	81	75	69	68	65	65
Mean monthly sunshine hours	148.2	156.4	204.1	223.0	249.3	223.1	188.7	193.3	183.1	183.8	152.8	145.3	2,251.1
Percentage possible sunshine	48	51	55	56	57	51	43	47	50	53	51	49	51
Source: China Meteorological Administration
