= Julu Commandery =

Historical commandery of China located in modern-day southern Hebei

Julu Commandery (simplified Chinese: 巨鹿郡; traditional Chinese: 鉅鹿郡) was a historical commandery of China, located in modern-day southern Hebei.

The commandery was established by Qin after it annexed Zhao in 222 BC. In early Western Han dynasty, it was part of the Zhao Kingdom. After the failed Rebellion of the Seven States of which Zhao was a participant, Julu became directly administered by the Han government. In 2 AD, the commandery administered 20 counties, namely Julu (鉅鹿), Nandu (南讀), Guang'e (廣阿), Xiangshi (象氏), Yingtao (廮陶), Songzi (宋子), Yangshi (楊氏), Linping (臨平), Xiaquyang (下曲陽), Shi (貰), Qiao (郻), Xinshi (新巿), Tangyang (堂陽), Anding (安定), Jingwu (敬武), Lixiang (歷鄉), Lexin (樂信), Wutao (武陶), Baixiang (柏鄉) and Anxiang (安鄉), with a total population of 827,177, in 155,951 households. During Emperor Wu's reign, a separate Guangping Commandery (廣平郡) was formed on the territories of Julu, and was later converted to a principality granted to Liu Yan (劉偃), a nephew of the emperor as his fief. 16 counties were listed under Guangping in the Book of Han, namely Guangping (廣平), Zhang (張), Chaoping (朝平), Nanhe (南和), Lieren (列人), Chizhang (斥章), Ren (任), Nanzhou (曲周), Nanqu (南曲), Quliang (曲梁), Guangxiang (廣鄉), Pingli (平利), Pingxiang (平鄉), Yangtai (陽臺), Guangnian (廣年) and Chengxiang (城鄉). Another principality, Guangzong (廣宗), briefly existed from 2 AD to the end of Western Han, covering only the county of Yingtao.

After the establishment of Eastern Han dynasty, Guangping was merged back to Julu. In 140 AD, the total number of counties was 15, while the population was 602,096, or 109,517 households. Guangping and Guangzong principalities were again created in early Eastern Han, but they had both been dissolved by 82 AD.
