= AD 197 =

197 in various calendars
- Gregorian calendar: 197; CXCVII
- Ab urbe condita: 950
- Assyrian calendar: 4947
- Balinese saka calendar: 118–119
- Bengali calendar: −397 – −396
- Berber calendar: 1147
- Buddhist calendar: 741
- Burmese calendar: −441
- Byzantine calendar: 5705–5706
- Chinese calendar: 丙子年 (Fire Rat); 2894 or 2687 — to — 丁丑年 (Fire Ox); 2895 or 2688
- Coptic calendar: −87 – −86
- Discordian calendar: 1363
- Ethiopian calendar: 189–190
- Hebrew calendar: 3957–3958
- Hindu calendars
- Vikram Samvat: 253–254
- Shaka Samvat: 118–119
- Kali Yuga: 3297–3298
- Holocene calendar: 10197
- Iranian calendar: 425 BP – 424 BP
- Islamic calendar: 438 BH – 437 BH
- Javanese calendar: 74–75
- Julian calendar: 197; CXCVII
- Korean calendar: 2530
- Minguo calendar: 1715 before ROC 民前1715年
- Nanakshahi calendar: −1271
- Seleucid era: 508/509 AG
- Thai solar calendar: 739–740
- Tibetan calendar: མེ་ཕོ་བྱི་བ་ལོ་ (male Fire-Rat); 323 or −58 or −830 — to — མེ་མོ་གླང་ལོ་ (female Fire-Ox); 324 or −57 or −829

Year 197 (CXCVII) was a common year starting on Saturday of the Julian calendar. At the time, it was known as the Year of the Consulship of Magius and Rufinus (or, less frequently, year 950 Ab urbe condita). The denomination 197 for this year has been used since the early medieval period, when the Anno Domini calendar era became the prevalent method in Europe for naming years.

== Events ==
=== By place ===
==== Roman Empire ====
- February 19 – Battle of Lugdunum: Emperor Septimius Severus defeats the self-proclaimed emperor Clodius Albinus at Lugdunum (modern Lyon). Albinus commits suicide; legionaries sack the town.
- Septimius Severus returns to Rome and has about 30 of Albinus's supporters in the Senate executed. After his victory he declares himself the adopted son of the late Marcus Aurelius.
- Septimius Severus forms new naval units, manning all the triremes in Italy with heavily armed troops for war in the East. His soldiers embark on an artificial canal between the Tigris and Euphrates.
- Legio I, II, and III Parthica are levied by Septimius Severus for his Parthian campaign.
- The Roman army marches east to repel a Parthian invasion of Mesopotamia; they loot the royal palace at Ctesiphon and capture an enormous number of its inhabitants as slaves.
- Septimius Severus reconstitutes the Province of Mesopotamia under an equestrian governor commanding two legions.
- Septimius Severus, who had spared the Senate at the beginning of his reign, now excludes it from controlling the Roman Empire by declaring a military dictatorship.

==== Asia ====
- Battle of Wancheng: Zhang Xiu launches a surprise attack at Cao Cao.
- Yuan Shu declares himself emperor of the short-lived Zhong dynasty.
- Sansang becomes ruler of the Korean kingdom of Goguryeo.

=== By topic ===
==== Art and Science ====
- Galen's major work on medicines, Pharmacologia, is published.

==== Religion ====
- A Christian council is held in Edessa.

== Births ==
- Cao, Chinese empress of the Han dynasty (d. 260)
- Deng Ai, Chinese general of the Cao Wei state (d. 264)

== Deaths ==
- February 19 – Clodius Albinus, Roman general and usurper
- Cao Ang (or Zixiu), eldest son of Cao Cao (b. 177)
- Dian Wei, Chinese general serving under Cao Cao
- Gaius Julius Erucius Clarus Vibianus, Roman politician
- Gogukcheon of Goguryeo, Korean ruler of Goguryeo
- Guo Si (or Guo Duo), Chinese general and regent
- Li Jue, Chinese general serving under Dong Zhuo
- Liu Chong, Chinese nobleman and Prince of Chen
- Titus Flavius Claudius Sulpicianus, Roman statesman
- Yang Feng, Chinese general serving under Li Jue
