= War between Cao Cao and Zhang Xiu =

Conflicts between warlords Cao Cao and Zhang Xiu (197-199)

- Part of the wars at the end of the Han dynasty
Date	c. February 197 – December 199
Location	several locations in present-day Nanyang, Henan
Result	Zhang Xiu's surrender

Belligerents
Cao Cao	Zhang Xiu; Liu Biao

Commanders and leaders
Cao Cao; Cao Hong; Yu Jin; Dian Wei †; Cao Ang †; Cao Anmin †	Zhang Xiu (surrendered); Jia Xu (surrendered); Liu Biao; Deng Ji (POW)

War between Cao Cao and Zhang Xiu
- Traditional Chinese: 曹操與張繡之戰
- Simplified Chinese: 曹操与张绣之战
Transcriptions
Standard Mandarin
- Hanyu Pinyin: Cáo Cāo yǔ Zhāng Xiù zhī zhàn

The war between Cao Cao and Zhang Xiu was fought between the warlords Cao Cao and Zhang Xiu between 197 and 199 in the late Eastern Han dynasty of China. It concluded with Zhang Xiu's surrender to Cao Cao.

== Background ==
In 196, the warlord Cao Cao led his forces into the ruins of the old imperial capital, Luoyang, where he met Emperor Xian, the figurehead Han emperor who had been held hostage consecutively by the warlords Dong Zhuo, Li Jue and Guo Si since his coronation in 189. He had only escaped from Chang'an in late 195 after being held hostage by Li Jue and Guo Si since Dong Zhuo's death in 192. Cao Cao treated the emperor respectfully and escorted him from Luoyang to his own base in Xu (許; present-day Xuchang, Henan), which became the new imperial capital.

In the meantime, Li Jue and Guo Si's power bloc in Chang'an and the Guanzhong region started to weaken and break up – especially after Emperor Xian's escape. Zhang Ji, a former ally of Li Jue and Guo Si, led his followers out of the Guanzhong region into Jing Province, which was governed by the warlord Liu Biao. In an attempt to establish a foothold in Jing Province, Zhang Ji led his men to attack Rang County (穰縣; or Rangcheng 穰城; present-day Dengzhou, Henan) but was killed by a stray arrow in battle. Instead of taking revenge against Zhang Ji's followers, Liu Biao took pity on them and made peace with Zhang Ji's nephew and successor, Zhang Xiu. He also gave Zhang Xiu and his followers control over Wancheng (宛城; also known simply as Wan 宛; in present-day Nanyang, Henan) in northern Jing Province.

== Battle of Wancheng ==
Sometime between 5 February and 6 March 197, (Note: Cao Cao biography in Sanguozhi recorded that the Battle of Wancheng took place in the 1st month of the 2nd year of the Jian'an era in Emperor Xian's reign. This month corresponds to 5 February to 6 March 197 in the Gregorian calendar.) Cao Cao led his forces to attack Zhang Xiu. When his forces reached the Yu River (淯水; now known as the Bai River 白河; flowing through parts of present-day Henan and Hubei), Zhang Xiu surrendered without putting up a fight. Cao Cao was so pleased that he threw a banquet for Zhang Xiu and his followers. During the banquet, Dian Wei, a military officer under Cao Cao, stood guard beside his lord and held a giant battle axe whose blade was one chi long. Zhang Xiu and his followers did not dare to look up when they toasted to Cao Cao.

Cao Cao stayed in Wancheng for more than 10 days after receiving Zhang Xiu's surrender. During this time, he became attracted to Zhang Ji's widow (Note: Zhang Ji's widow is called "Lady Zou" (鄒氏) in the 14th-century historical novel Romance of the Three Kingdoms.) and took her as his concubine. Zhang Xiu, feeling outraged and humiliated, plotted revenge against Cao Cao. Cao Cao heard about Zhang Xiu's unhappiness and he planned to have Zhang Xiu assassinated.

Earlier on, Zhang Xiu's adviser, Jia Xu, suggested to his lord to ask Cao Cao if he could station his troops at a higher location near Cao Cao's camp. Following Jia Xu's advice, Zhang Xiu also asked Cao Cao: "My troops have too few chariots and they are too heavy. Can I let my troops wear heavy armour?" Cao Cao did not suspect anything and he approved Zhang Xiu's requests.

At the time, Zhang Xiu had a close aide Hu Che'er (胡車兒), who was known for his exceptional courage. Cao Cao was so impressed by Huche'er that he gave him some gold as a gift. As Zhang Xiu already knew that Cao Cao wanted to have him assassinated, he thought that Cao Cao was trying to bribe Huche'er to be the assassin, so he quickly launched a preemptive surprise attack on Cao Cao's camp.

As Cao Cao was totally caught off guard by Zhang Xiu's attack, his forces suffered a disastrous defeat – especially when Zhang Xiu had already planned out the attack and deployed his troops near Cao Cao's camp. Cao Cao had no choice but to retreat, with only a few horsemen accompanying him. Dian Wei remained behind with about a dozen of his men to cover Cao Cao's retreat. All of them were eventually overwhelmed by Zhang Xiu's forces and killed in battle. During his escape, Cao Cao injured his face and foot when his horse, Jueying (絕影), threw him off its back after being hit by arrows. Cao Cao also sustained an arrow wound in his right arm. Cao Ang, Cao Cao's eldest son, gave his horse to his father to help him escape. Cao Ang and Cao Cao's nephew Cao Anmin (曹安民) were both killed by Zhang Xiu's forces later.

== Battle of Wuyin ==
As Cao Cao and his remaining forces retreated to Wuyin County (舞陰縣; southeast of present-day Sheqi County, Henan), Zhang Xiu's forces continued to attack them along the way. Only Yu Jin, a colonel under Cao Cao, managed to lead his unit on an orderly retreat towards Wuyin County and make his men stay together despite suffering many casualties and losses. When Zhang Xiu's forces eased off their attacks, Yu Jin regrouped his men and they marched to Wuyin County in a dignified manner even though they lost the battle.

Before reaching his destination, Yu Jin learnt that the Qingzhou Corps (青州兵), an elite unit in Cao Cao's army composed of former Yellow Turban rebels, had taken advantage of the chaos to pillage villages along the way. He then led his men to attack and punish the Qingzhou soldiers. Some Qingzhou soldiers managed to flee to Wuyin County, meet Cao Cao, and falsely accuse Yu Jin of committing the atrocities they were responsible for. When Yu Jin reached Wuyin County, instead of going straight to meet Cao Cao and explain himself, Yu Jin immediately went to set up defensive fortifications around Cao Cao's camp because he knew that Cao Cao, given his wisdom, would not believe the Qingzhou soldiers' lies so there was no rush for him to explain himself. He also thought that it was more important to strengthen their defences in case Zhang Xiu attacked again. Yu Jin was proven right; Cao Cao also praised and rewarded him for his efforts.

At Wuyin County, Cao Cao managed to rally his remaining troops to hold their ground and fend off a final wave of attacks by Zhang Xiu's cavalry. After failing to defeat Cao Cao at Wuyin County, Zhang Xiu retreated to Rang County (穰縣; or Rangcheng 穰城; present-day Dengzhou, Henan), where he met up with Liu Biao. Cao Cao broke down in tears when he heard of Dian Wei's death, and later had Dian Wei's body retrieved and buried in Xiangyi County (襄邑縣; present-day Sui County, Henan). He returned to his base in Xu (許; present-day Xuchang, Henan) after that.

== Battles of Ye, Huyang and Wuyin ==
After Cao Cao left Wuyin County (舞陰縣; southeast of present-day Sheqi County, Henan), many counties in two commanderies – Nanyang and Zhangling (章陵; around present-day Zaoyang, Hubei) – rebelled against him and defected to Zhang Xiu's side. When he sent his cousin Cao Hong to lead troops to attack and recapture those counties, Zhang Xiu and Liu Biao's forces defeated Cao Hong and forced him to retreat to Ye County (葉縣; southwest of present-day Ye County, Henan). During this time, Zhang Xiu and Liu Biao's forces attacked Cao Hong at Ye County several times but Cao Hong managed to defend his position.

Sometime between 28 November and 26 December 197, (Note: Cao Cao's biography in Sanguozhi recorded that this campaign took place in the 11th month of the 2nd year of the Jian'an era in Emperor Xian's reign. This month corresponds to 28 November to 26 December 197 in the Gregorian calendar.) Cao Cao launched another campaign against Zhang Xiu and personally led his forces to Wancheng (宛城; in present-day Nanyang, Henan). At the bank of the Yu River (淯水; now known as the Bai River 白河; flowing through parts of present-day Henan and Hubei), he held a memorial service to mourn the people who lost their lives in the previous campaign against Zhang Xiu. During the ceremony, he wept inconsolably and touched the hearts of everyone present at the scene.

Liu Biao sent Deng Ji (鄧濟), a military officer under him, to lead troops to occupy and guard Huyang County (湖陽縣; southwest of present-day Tanghe County, Henan). Cao Cao later led his forces to attack Huyang County, conquered it, and took Deng Ji as a prisoner-of-war. He then followed up by attacking Wuyin County and succeeded in capturing it too.

== Battle of Rangcheng ==
Cao Cao returned to his base in Xu (許; present-day Xuchang, Henan) sometime between 26 January and 23 February 198 (Note: The Sanguozhi recorded that this event took place in the 1st month of the 3rd year of the Jian'an era in Emperor Xian's reign. This month corresponds to 26 January to 23 February 198 in the Gregorian calendar.) after his second campaign against Zhang Xiu. Between 24 April and 23 May, (Note: The Sanguozhi recorded that this event took place in the 3rd month of the 3rd year of the Jian'an era in Emperor Xian's reign. This month corresponds to 24 April to 23 May 198 in the Gregorian calendar.) he launched a third campaign and led his forces to attack Zhang Xiu at Rang County (穰縣; or Rangcheng 穰城; present-day Dengzhou, Henan). Between 22 June and 21 July, (Note: The Sanguozhi recorded that this event took place in the 5th month of the 3rd year of the Jian'an era in Emperor Xian's reign. This month corresponds to 22 June to 21 July 198 in the Gregorian calendar.) Liu Biao sent reinforcements to assist Zhang Xiu and attempt to block Cao Cao's army from the rear.

Around this time, Cao Cao received intelligence that Tian Feng, an adviser to his rival Yuan Shao, had suggested that Yuan Shao should take advantage of Cao Cao's absence from Xu to launch an attack on the imperial capital, seize Emperor Xian, and bring him to his base in Ye (鄴; in present-day Handan, Hebei). Upon hearing this, he immediately lifted the siege on Rang County and prepared to return to Xu. However, he could not retreat as Zhang Xiu came to intercept him, so he ordered his troops to retreat carefully while ensuring that their camps were always linked so that they could back each other up in the event of an enemy attack. Cao Cao wrote a letter to his adviser Xun Yu, who was stationed in Xu: "Even though the enemy has travelled several li in a day to catch up with me, I have a plan to deal with them. When I reach Anzhong, I will definitely defeat Zhang Xiu." When he reached Anzhong County (安眾縣; in present-day Dengzhou, Henan), Zhang Xiu and Liu Biao's forces occupied the strategic locations in front and behind, trapping him and his forces in between. Cao Cao then ordered his troops to secretly dig tunnels and transport their supplies and heavy equipment back to Xu under the cover of night, while he and his remaining troops hid themselves and waited in ambush.

In the morning, when Zhang Xiu received news that Cao Cao's camps were empty, he thought that Cao Cao had fled so he wanted to lead his troops in pursuit. However, Jia Xu, his adviser, warned him not to pursue Cao Cao and predicted that he would lose if he did. Zhang Xiu ignored him and went ahead. Just as Jia Xu foresaw, Zhang Xiu fell into Cao Cao's ambush and was soundly defeated. When Zhang Xiu came back after his defeat, Jia Xu told him to attack again and predicted that he would win this time. Zhang Xiu said, "I didn't listen to you earlier, which resulted in my defeat. Now that I have lost, why should I attack again?" Jia Xu replied, "Changes have taken place. You'll win if you swiftly attack now." Zhang Xiu heeded Jia Xu's advice and attacked Cao Cao again. He won the battle the second time.

After the battle, Zhang Xiu asked Jia Xu: "When I led my best troops to attack Cao Cao while he was retreating, you predicted I would lose. When I led my troops to attack Cao Cao again just after he defeated me, you predicted I would win. Your predictions turned out to be accurate. But why is it that your predictions seem so counter-intuitive?" Jia Xu replied, "It's easy to understand. General, you may be skilled in warfare, but you're still no match for Cao Cao. When Cao Cao withdrew his forces, I knew he would personally lead his rearguard to cover his retreat. Even though your troops are well-trained, Cao Cao is better than you as a military leader, and his troops are as equally well-trained as yours. Therefore, I knew you would lose. When Cao Cao first attacked you and decided to retreat halfway even though he didn't make any mistakes, I believed something must have happened in his base. After he defeated your pursuing forces, he would lower his guard and hastily retreat. His officers will then take command of the rearguard. They may be brave, but they are no match for you. Therefore, I knew you would win them even though you're leading a group of soldiers who have just been defeated." Zhang Xiu was very impressed with Jia Xu's analysis.

Cao Cao returned to his base in Xu (許; present-day Xuchang, Henan) sometime between 20 August and 18 September 198. (Note: The Sanguozhi recorded that this event took place in the 7th month of the 3rd year of the Jian'an era in Emperor Xian's reign. This month corresponds to 20 August to 18 September 198 in the Gregorian calendar.) When Xun Yu asked Cao Cao how he knew he would definitely defeat Zhang Xiu when he wrote the letter to Xun Yu earlier during the battle, Cao Cao replied: "The enemy wanted to prevent me and my men from retreating. In doing so, they were forcing us to fight for our lives. That was when I knew we would definitely win."

== Zhang Xiu's surrender ==
In 199, when Cao Cao and Yuan Shao were about to clash at the Battle of Guandu, Yuan Shao sent a messenger to meet Zhang Xiu and propose an alliance between them against Cao Cao. Zhang Xiu wanted to agree, but his adviser Jia Xu told Yuan Shao's messenger, "I say 'No, thank you.' to Yuan Benchu. He can't even accommodate his own brother. What makes him think he can accommodate talents from all over the Tianxia?"

A shocked Zhang Xiu turned to Jia Xu and asked, "Why do you have to say this? What will become of me now?" Jia Xu replied, "Why don't you submit to Cao Cao?" Zhang Xiu asked, "Yuan Shao is powerful while Cao Cao is weak. Besides, I'm also Cao Cao's enemy. What will happen if I submit to him?" Jia Xu replied, "That's why it is better for you to submit to Cao Cao. He controls the Tianxia in the name of the Emperor. This is the first reason why you should submit to him. Yuan Shao is militarily more powerful. You have less troops than him, so even if you join him, he won't regard you highly. Cao Cao has less troops. If you join him, he'll be delighted. This is the second reason why you should submit to him. A man who aspires to become a great ruler will be more willing to put aside personal enmities and make his virtues known to people. This is the third reason why you should submit to Cao Cao. I hope you won't have any more doubts." Zhang Xiu heeded Jia Xu's advice and led his forces to surrender to and join Cao Cao.

Zhang Xiu surrendered to Cao Cao sometime between 6 December 199 and 3 January 200. (Note: The Sanguozhi recorded that this event took place in the 11th month of the 4th year of the Jian'an era in Emperor Xian's reign. This month corresponds to 6 December 199 to 3 January 200 in the Gregorian calendar.) When Zhang Xiu showed up, Cao Cao came out to welcome him, held his hand, and hosted a banquet in his honour. Apart from recommending Emperor Xian to enfeoff Zhang Xiu as a marquis and appoint him as General Who Spreads Martial Might (揚武將軍), Cao Cao also arranged for one of his sons, Cao Jun, to marry Zhang Xiu's daughter. Zhang Xiu fought on Cao Cao's side during the Battle of Guandu against Yuan Shao and was promoted to General Who Defeats the Qiang (破羌將軍) for his contributions.

== In popular culture ==
The Battle of Wancheng is featured in Koei's video game series Dynasty Warriors as a playable stage and the highlight of Dian Wei's story mode. If the player is not playing as Dian Wei, Dian Wei makes his last appearance in that stage and does not appear again in the subsequent stages. In Dynasty Warriors 7, after Cao Cao escapes from the castle, he attacks Zhang Xiu with Xiahou Dun and Xu Chu and ends up gaining Jia Xu in his ranks. If Zhang Xiu is defeated by Cao Cao, it is not known if he was killed by Cao Cao or retreated from the battle.
