= Xu Yi (Han dynasty) =

Chinese official serving warlord Cao Cao (died c. 219)

- 徐奕

Commandant of the Capital
- In office 219 – ?
- Monarch: Emperor Xian of Han
- Chancellor: Cao Cao (from 208)

Director of the Secretariat
- In office ? – 219

Chief Clerk To The Chancellor (under Cao Cao)
- In office 217 – ?
- Preceded by: Yang Jun

Administrator of Wei
- In office 216 – 217

Junior Clerk in the Department of the East
- In office ? – 216

Master of Writing
- In office 213 – ?

Inspector of Yong
- In office ?–?

Chief Clerk To The Chancellor (under Cao Cao)
- In office after 211 – ?

Personal details
- Born: Unknown Dongguan, Langye commandery
- Died: c.late 219
- Occupation: Official
- Courtesy name: Jicai (季才)

Xu Yi (died c.late 219), (Note: Since Xu Yi died at least a few months after Wei Feng, who died in Sep or Oct 219, Xu's death should be in late 219 or early 220.) courtesy name Jicai, was a strict official, though sometimes an isolated figure at court, he was often trusted by the warlord Cao Cao to look after the capital Ye, in the late Eastern Han dynasty of China.

== Life and career ==
Xu Yi was born in Dongguan in Langye commandery, present day Yishui in Shandong. In the 190s as the land plunged into civil war, Xu Yi fled across the Jiang river but when the young local warlord Sun Ce sought to recruit him, Xu Yi changed his name and fled back home in disguise. He later joined the staff of Cao Cao, the Minister of Works, (putting it sometime between 196 and 208) and controller of the Han Emperor. Later, he accompanied the now Chancellor Cao Cao in the 211 campaign against Ma Chao and the Liang warlords who had risen up for fear Cao Cao was intending to attack. After Cao Cao's victory, there were concerns that the Land Within the Passes (the territory around the Western Han dynasty capital Chang'an) was unsettled and not yet secure. So Xu Yi was made Chief Clerk and placed in Chang'an to help secure the area. Earning praise there, Xu Yi was promoted to Inspector of Yong.

== Service at capital ==
When Cao Cao became Duke of Wei in 213, Xu Yi was recalled to Cao Cao's capital and joined his Secretariat as a Master of Writing. However Xu Yi and Mao Jie's strictness left them isolated at court with few political allies. Over time, Xu Yi became an enemy of the powerful official Ding Yi and despite advice to show him respect, Xu Yi refused to defer to Ding Yi. Xu Yi made no response to Ding Yi's accusations, as he was confident Cao Cao would see through Ding Yi's attempts against him and trusted in his own abilities to protect himself. Influential Attendant Huan Jie frequently acted to protect Xu Yi and in 216 Cao Cao moved Xu Yi away from his court position as Junior Clerk in the Department of the East, leading Cao Wei and Jin commentator Fu Xuan to remark that Cao Cao showed limits to his wisdom as, due to Ding Yi's influence, he had turned against two good officials: demoting Xu Yi and forcing the death of senior official Cui Yan. However, though Xu Yi was moved out of Ye itself, his new appointment to the post of Administrator of Wei Commandery, given it covered Cao Cao's capital of Ye and his ducal seat, was still a position of some trust and import.

The next year when Cao Cao went to attack Sun Quan at Ruxu he made Xu Yi Chief Clerk and had him look after his capital at Ye while Cao Cao was away on campaign. Cao Cao praised Xu Yi's loyalty and integrity, knowing he could trust his affairs to Xu Yi's hands but urged him to be less strict. Xu Yi would later rise to head the Secretariat.

In 219, Xu Yi went west with Cao Cao as part of an army to reinforce the defenders at Hanzhong against the future Shu Han Emperor Liu Bei's attack. But news reached Cao Cao of the well-connected Wei Feng's failed plot back in Ye. Yang Jun as Commandant of the Capital began an investigation, drawing up a list of punishments and impeached himself. Cao Pi, displeased with Yang Jun for taking matters into his own hands, had Yang Jun moved to Pingyuan meaning a replacement was required back in Ye. Cao Cao sighed that he had nobody in Ye who could have discovered Wei Feng's plan (Note: The plot leaked due to Chen Yi, a senior member of the plot, getting nervous and informing Cao Pi.) Huan Jie recommended Xu Yi and Cao Cao hand wrote an order for Xu Yi to go to Ye to be the new Commandant, comparing him to respected figures of old, such as Cheng Dechen, as an upright figure of state. (Note: "Ziyu" was Cheng Dechen's courtesy name; he was deemed a great threat by Duke Wen of Jin, so much so that Duke Wen could not sit straight.) However, after several months, Xu Yi became gravely ill and resigned. He was appointed to the court in a consultant role but died soon after.

== Legacy ==
When Cao Pi became King of Wei after the death of his father in March 220, he rewarded families of dead officers like Xu Yi in memory of their loyal service and since Xu Yi had no son, he gave a position to Xu Tong, son of a cousin, and had Xu Tong continue Xu Yi's line. Cao Pi as Emperor of the new Cao Wei dynasty is said to have regularly sighed during meetings with his ministers and reflected approvingly on Xu Yi's conduct. Chen Shou, when compiling biographies for the Sanguozhi, explained his placing of Xu Yi's biography as a man of lofty integrity and great fame like He Kui and Xing Yu but perhaps lacking a bit of political prudence for court.
