= Princess Qinghe =

Princess Qinghe (清河長公主; fl.210-230) was an imperial princess of the state of Cao Wei, who lived during the late Han dynasty to the Three Kingdoms period (220-280AD). She was the eldest daughter of Cao Cao, and her mother was Lady Liu. Her full brothers were Cao Ang and Cao Shuo, while her half-siblings included Cao Pi, Cao Zhi, and Cao Jie.

== Biography ==
Her name was not recorded in historical accounts; ''Princess Qinghe'' is only a title she held. (Note: The title "Elder Princess" (長公主) originally referred to an honorary title given to those who received great respect among the emperor's sisters and daughters. Later, it came to refer to the emperor's sisters themselves.) Her mother was Lady Liu, a concubine of Cao Cao who died early. Despite being born from a concubine, she was the eldest among Cao Cao's children. When Cao Cao was searching for a suitable son-in-law for his daughter, he heard of a young man named Ding Yi, the son of his old friend Ding Chong, who was known for his wisdom and popularity. Cao Cao consulted his son, Cao Pi, on the matter. However, Cao Pi responded, "Ding Yi has a deformed appearance with one eye, and such an unattractive man would not be well-received by your beloved daughter." Cao Pi further suggested, "It would be more suitable for her to marry the son of Xiahou Dun, Xiahou Mao." As a result, Cao Cao canceled the marriage arrangement with Ding Yi and married his daughter to Xiahou Mao.

However, later on, Cao Cao had the opportunity to meet Ding Yi in person and recognized his exceptional intelligence. He regretted not choosing Ding Yi as his son-in-law and said, "My son misled me," expressing his remorse. From that point forward, Ding Yi harbored resentment against Cao Pi and, along with his brother Ding Yi, began supporting Cao Pi's half-brother Cao Zhi and recommended him as the Crown Prince.

In the year 220, Cao Pi became the first emperor of Cao Wei. He made his sister Princess of Qinghe (in Gangling) and appointed Xiahou Mao as General Who Stabilises the West (安西將軍), putting him in charge of military affairs in the Guanzhong region. Later, Cao Zhi went to the capital to apologize to Cao Pi, he asked Princess Qinghe to mediate on his behalf. However, the officials at the checkpoint reported this to Cao Pi, who then sent someone to escort Cao Zhi. Suddenly, Cao Zhi's whereabouts became unknown, causing great worry to his mother, the Empress Dowager Bian. She feared that he might have committed suicide. Shortly thereafter, Cao Zhi reappeared, presented himself to his elder brother, and apologized while offering his own life.

In the 228, during the reign of her nephew Cao Rui, Xiahou Mao was recalled to serve as a high-ranking official. Previously, while leading troops in the Guanzhong region, Xiahou Mao had accumulated many concubines, which had caused dissatisfaction with Princess Qinghe.

Around 230, tensions between Xiahou Mao and his wife got worse. Xiahou Mao's two younger brothers, Xiahou Zizang (夏侯子臧) and Xiahou Zijiang (夏侯子江) had earned Xiahou Mao's ire over failing to respect the courtesies and they feared punishment so they allied with Princess Qinghe, writing a memorial on her behalf accusing Xiahou Mao of treason. Upon reviewing the reports, Cao Rui, who already disliked Xiahou Mao, sought to execute him. However, he consulted with Duan Mo, who argued that the accusations were likely a result of discord between Xiahou Mao and Princess of Qinghe, rather than factual charges. Duan Mo also pointed out that Xiahou Dun, Xiahou Mao's father, had made significant contributions to the establishment of Cao Wei. Cao Rui ordered an investigation as to who wrote the memorial and when truth came out, Cao Rui abandoned the idea of executing Xiahou Mao.

== Sources ==
- Chen, Shou (3rd century). Records of the Three Kingdoms (Sanguozhi).
- de Crespigny, Rafe (2007). A Biographical Dictionary of Later Han to the Three Kingdoms 23-220 AD. Leiden: Brill. ISBN 9789004156050.
- Fan, Ye (5th century). Book of the Later Han (Houhanshu).
