= Cao Shuo (Cao Cao's son) =

Son of Cao Cao and Prince of Xiang

Cao Shuo 曹鑠

Prince of Xiang (相王) (posthumous)
- Successor: Cao Qian
- Born: Unknown
- Died: Unknown
- Issue: Cao Qian
Names
- Family name: Cao (曹); Given name: Shuo (鑠)
Posthumous name
- Prince Shang (殤王)
- House: House of Cao
- Father: Cao Cao
- Mother: Consort Liu

Cao Shuo (fl.early third century) was a son of Cao Cao, a warlord who rose to prominence towards the end of the Han dynasty and laid the foundation for the Cao Wei state during the Three Kingdoms period of China. His mother was Lady Liu (劉夫人), a concubine of Cao Cao. She also bore Cao Cao another son (Cao Ang) and a daughter (Princess Qinghe (清河公主)). He died sometime before the Cao Wei state was established in 220. In 229, the second Wei emperor, Cao Rui, honoured Cao Shuo with the posthumous title "Prince Shang of Xiang" (相殤王). In 233, Cao Rui designated Cao Shuo's son, Cao Qian (曹潛), as the Prince of Xiang (相王), but Cao Qian died in the same year and was posthumously honoured as "Prince Min of Xiang" (相愍王). In 234, Cao Rui designated Cao Yan (曹偃), Cao Qian's son, as the new Prince of Xiang and granted him a princedom containing 2,500 taxable households. Cao Yan died in 236 and was posthumously honoured as "Prince Huai of Xiang" (相懷王). Since Cao Yan had no son to succeed him, his princedom was abolished. In 255, the fifth Wei emperor Cao Mao designated Cao Song (曹竦), a son of Cao Mao (Prince of Laoling), as Cao Yan's successor and restored the princedom.

== See also ==
- Cao Wei family trees#Lady Liu
- Lists of people of the Three Kingdoms
