= Huan Jie =

Late 2nd/early 3rd century Chinese official

- 桓階

Minister of Ceremonies (太常)
- In office ?–?
- Monarch: Cao Pi

Palace Attendant (侍中)
- In office 220 – ?
- Monarch: Cao Pi

Prefect of the Masters of Writing (尚書令)
- In office 220 – ?
- Monarch: Cao Pi

Master of Writing (尚書)
- In office ? – 220
- Monarch: Emperor Xian of Han
- Chancellor: Cao Cao

Palace Attendant (侍中)
- In office 213 – ?
- Monarch: Emperor Xian of Han
- Chancellor: Cao Cao

Huben General of the Household (虎賁中郎將)
- In office 213 – ?
- Monarch: Emperor Xian of Han
- Chancellor: Cao Cao

Administrator of Zhao Commandery (趙郡太守)
- In office ? – 213
- Monarch: Emperor Xian of Han
- Chancellor: Cao Cao

Registrar of the Imperial Chancellor (丞相主簿)
- In office 208 – ?
- Monarch: Emperor Xian of Han
- Chancellor: Cao Cao

Gentleman of Writing (尚書郎)
- In office ?–?
- Monarchs: Emperor Ling of Han / Emperor Xian of Han

Personal details
- Born: Unknown Linxiang, Hunan
- Died: between December 220 and June 226 (Note: Cao Pi became emperor in Dec 220 and died in Jun 226 in the Julian calendar.)
- Relations: Huan Chao (grandfather); Huan Zuan (brother); Huan Yi (brother)
- Children: Huan Jia; at least three other sons
- Parent: Huan Sheng (father)
- Occupation: Official
- Courtesy name: Boxu (伯緒/伯序)
- Posthumous name: Marquis Zhen (貞侯)
- Peerage: Marquis of Anle District (安樂鄉侯)

Huan Jie (fl.190 – early 220s), courtesy name Boxu, was a Chinese official who lived during the late Eastern Han dynasty and served under the warlord Cao Cao. After the fall of the Eastern Han dynasty, he briefly served in the state of Cao Wei during the Three Kingdoms period.

== Family background ==
Huan Jie was from Linxiang County (臨湘縣), Changsha Commandery (長沙郡), which is present-day Linxiang, Hunan. His grandfather Huan Chao (桓超) and father Huan Sheng (桓勝) both served as commandery administrators in the Eastern Han dynasty. Huan Sheng was also a Master of Writing (尚書) in the imperial secretariat and was famous in southern China.

== Early career ==
Huan Jie started his career as an Officer of Merit (功曹) in Changsha Commandery, his home commandery. Sometime between 187 and 190, when Sun Jian was the Administrator (太守) of Changsha Commandery, he nominated Huan Jie as a xiaolian, so the Han central government summoned Huan Jie to the imperial capital, Luoyang, to serve as a Gentleman of Writing (尚書郎). When his father died, Huan Jie resigned and went home to perform filial mourning.

In 191, after Sun Jian was killed in action at the Battle of Xiangyang against Liu Biao, the Governor of Jing Province, Huan Jie braved the odds and travelled to Xiangyang to plead with Liu Biao to give him Sun Jian's body so that he could hold a proper funeral for Sun Jian. Liu Biao was so impressed by Huan Jie's sense of righteousness that he agreed. Huan Jie later returned Sun Jian's body to his family, who buried him in Qu'e County (曲阿縣; in present-day Danyang, Jiangsu).

== Service under Zhang Xian and Liu Biao ==
In 200, when the warlords Cao Cao and Yuan Shao clashed at the Battle of Guandu, Liu Biao wanted to rally troops from the commanderies throughout Jing Province (covering present-day Hubei and Hunan) and send them to attack Cao Cao and assist Yuan Shao. When Huan Jie heard about it, he went to see Zhang Xian (張羨), the Administrator of Changsha Commandery, and told him:

"Never in history has defeat not befall anyone who starts a war without a righteous cause. This is why Duke Huan of Qi led the various lords to pledge allegiance to the Zhou dynasty, and why Duke Wen of Jin defeated the usurper and restored King Xiang of Zhou to the throne. Today, the Yuan family are doing the opposite. When Liu Biao decides to support them, he is seeking his own doom. Wise Administrator, you should exercise your judgment and wisdom, so as to bring fortune to yourself and evade disaster. You shouldn't align yourself with them."

When Zhang Xian asked him what he should do, Huan Jie replied:

"Lord Cao may seem to be on the losing end at the moment. However, he has established himself as an upholder of righteousness, saved the imperial court from collapse, and used the mandate given to him by the Emperor to punish the unrighteous. Who dares to stand in his way? If you can convince the Administrators of the four commanderies in southern Jing Province to hold their positions for now, and support him when he comes to attack Liu Biao, that will be the best!"

Zhang Xian heeded Huan Jie's advice and succeeded in convincing the Administrators of three neighbouring commanderies – Wuling (武陵; around present-day Changde, Hunan), Lingling (零陵; around present-day Yongzhou, Hunan) and Guiyang (桂陽; around present-day Chenzhou, Hunan) – to break ties with Liu Biao and pledge allegiance to Cao Cao. Cao Cao was very pleased when he heard about it.

At the time, as Cao Cao was still at war with Yuan Shao, he could not lead his forces to Jing Province to attack Liu Biao. Liu Biao took advantage of the situation to launch an attack on Zhang Xian in Changsha Commandery. Zhang Xian died of illness during the siege; Changsha Commandery fell to Liu Biao's forces after Zhang Xian’s death. Huan Jie went into hiding after the fall of Changsha.

Some time later, Liu Biao pardoned Huan Jie for inciting Zhang Xian and the other three administrators to rebel against him, and recruited him to serve as an Assistant Officer and Libationer (從事祭酒) under him. He also wanted to arrange for Huan Jie to marry a younger sister of his wife, Lady Cai (蔡氏). However, Huan Jie rejected the offer and said that he was already married. He also claimed that he was ill and refused to serve under Liu Biao.

== Service under Cao Cao ==
In late 208, after Cao Cao received the surrender of Liu Cong, Liu Biao's son and successor as the Governor of Jing Province, he heard about Huan Jie's earlier advice to Zhang Xian and thought that Huan Jie was an extraordinary talent. He then recruited Huan Jie to be his Registrar (主簿) and later promoted him to the position of Administrator (太守) of Zhao Commandery (趙郡; around present-day Handan, Hebei).

=== Supporting Cao Pi in the succession rivalry ===
In 213, after Emperor Xian enfeoffed Cao Cao as the Duke of Wei (魏公) and granted him a dukedom based in Wei Commandery (魏郡; around present-day Handan, Hebei), Cao Cao appointed Huan Jie as a Palace Attendant (侍中) and General of the Household (中郎將) in the huben (虎賁) division of the imperial guards.

At the time, Cao Cao wanted to designate an heir apparent to his dukedom (later vassal kingdom) but had difficulty choosing between two of his sons, Cao Pi and Cao Zhi. Although he favoured Cao Zhi, he knew that by custom Cao Pi should be the heir apparent because he was the older one. Huan Jie often praised Cao Pi in front of Cao Cao, saying that Cao Pi was virtuous and the eldest among Cao Cao's living sons, so he satisfied all the criteria for being the heir apparent. Whenever he talked about the succession issue, be it in a private or public setting, he always stood by Cao Pi and spoke sincerely. Cao Cao saw Huan Jie as a faithful and loyal subject so he highly respected him.

Two of Huan Jie's colleagues, Mao Jie and Xu Yi, were known for being outspoken, upright and non-partisan. Ding Yi, an official who supported Cao Zhi, disliked them and often spoke ill of them in front of Cao Cao. When Huan Jie found out, he spoke up for Mao Jie and Xu Yi and defended them from Ding Yi's accusations. Throughout his career under Cao Cao, he did the same for many colleagues who were unjustly accused of wrongdoing. Some time later, he was promoted to the position of a Master of Writing (尚書) and put in charge of examining and selecting civil service candidates.

=== Battle of Fancheng ===
In 219, when Cao Ren was besieged by Guan Yu in Fancheng (樊城; present-day Fancheng District, Xiangyang, Hubei), Cao Cao ordered Xu Huang to lead reinforcements to assist Cao Ren. When Xu Huang initially failed to lift the siege on Fancheng, Cao Cao contemplated personally leading his forces to save Cao Ren, and he sought his advisers' opinions on this matter. Most of the advisers told Cao Cao: "Your Highness should make haste to Fancheng, or else (Cao Ren) will be defeated."

Huan Jie asked Cao Cao: "Your Highness, do you not think that Cao Ren and the others are capable of assessing and dealing with the situation on their own?" Cao Cao replied: "(They are) capable." Huan Jie then asked again: "Is Your Highness worried that (Cao Ren and Xu Huang) won't put in their best effort?" Cao Cao replied: "No." Huan Jie asked: "Then why do you want to personally lead your forces there?" Cao Cao replied: "I am worried that the enemy has superiority in numbers and that Xu Huang will be outnumbered and overwhelmed." Huan Jie said: "The reason why Cao Ren, despite being under siege, continues to fight with his life to defend Fancheng is because he knows that Your Highness is too far away to save him. When people are thrown into a desperate situation, they will fight for their lives. Now, they are all prepared to fight to the death, and they have strong external support (from Xu Huang). If Your Highness doesn't send more reinforcements to Fancheng, you are actually sending a message to the enemy that you are confident that Cao Ren and Xu Huang are competent enough to deal with the enemy. Why then do you need to worry that they will be defeated? Why then do you need to go there to help them?"

Cao Cao agreed and stationed his forces at Mobei (摩陂; southeast of present-day Jia County, Henan) while observing the situation at Fancheng. Later, as Huan Jie foresaw, Cao Ren managed to defend Fancheng while Xu Huang succeeded in breaking the siege.

== Service under Cao Pi ==
In late 220, some months after Cao Cao's death, Cao Pi usurped the throne from Emperor Xian, ended the Eastern Han dynasty, and established the state of Cao Wei with himself as the new emperor. After his coronation, Cao Pi appointed Huan Jie as Prefect of the Masters of Writing (尚書令) and Palace Attendant (侍中), and enfeoffed him as the Marquis of Gaoxiang District (高鄉亭侯).

When Huan Jie fell sick, Cao Pi visited him and said, "I hope to entrust my underage son and the fate of the Empire to you. Please take care of yourself." Huan Jie's marquis title was later changed to "Marquis of Anle District" (安樂鄉侯) and he received a marquisate comprising 600 taxable households. Cao Pi also enfeoffed three of Huan Jie's sons as Secondary Marquises (關內侯). Initially, he did not make Huan Jie's eldest son a marquis because Huan Jie's eldest son was expected to inherit his father's peerage as the Marquis of Anle District after Huan Jie died. However, when Huan Jie's eldest son died prematurely, Cao Pi granted him the posthumous title of a Secondary Marquis.

As Huan Jie became critically ill later, Cao Pi sent an emissary to reassign him to be the Minister of Ceremonies (太常). Huan Jie died shortly after. Cao Pi shed tears when he learnt of Huan Jie's death and he honoured Huan Jie with the posthumous title "Marquis Zhen" (貞侯).

== Family ==
Huan Jie's younger brother, Huan Zuan (桓纂), served as a Regular Mounted Attendant (散騎侍郎) in Wei and held the peerage of a Secondary Marquis (關內侯).

Huan Jie had another younger brother, Huan Yi (桓彝), (Note: He should not be confused with Huan Wen's father, who had the same name.) courtesy name Gongchang (公长), who served as a Master of Writing (尚書) in Wei's rival state, Eastern Wu. He was executed by the Wu regent Sun Chen in 258 when he refused to support Sun Chen in deposing the Wu emperor Sun Liang. Later, during the Jin dynasty, when Emperor Wu asked Xue Ying to name some famous officials in Wu, Xue Ying named Huan Yi and said he was "a loyal and faithful subject".

Huan Jie's son, Huan Jia (桓嘉), inherited his father's peerage as the Marquis of Anle District (安樂鄉侯). He also married a Wei noble lady, the Princess of Shengqian Village (升遷亭公主). During the Jiaping era (249–254) of Cao Fang's reign, Huan Jia served as the Administrator of Le'an Commandery (樂安郡; around present-day Zibo, Shandong). In 252, he led Wei forces from Le'an Commandery to participate in the Battle of Dongxing against Eastern Wu and was killed in action. The Wei government honoured him with the posthumous title "Marquis Zhuang" (壯侯). Huan Jia's son, Huan Yi (桓翊), succeeded his father as the next Marquis of Anle District.

The Shishuo (Note: It is unclear if the annotation came from the Wei Jin Shiyu (魏晋世语) or Shishuo Xinyu (世说新语).) recorded that Huan Jie had another grandson, Huan Ling (桓陵), whose courtesy name was Yuanhui (元徽). Huan Ling was famous during the reign of Emperor Wu of the Jin dynasty (266–420) and rose to the position of Administrator of Xingyang Commandery (滎陽郡; around present-day Xingyang, Henan).

== See also ==
- Lists of people of the Three Kingdoms
