= Battle of Bowang =

Battle between warlords Cao Cao and Liu Bei (202)

Coordinates: 32.0450°N 112.1360°E

- Part of the wars at the end of the Han dynasty
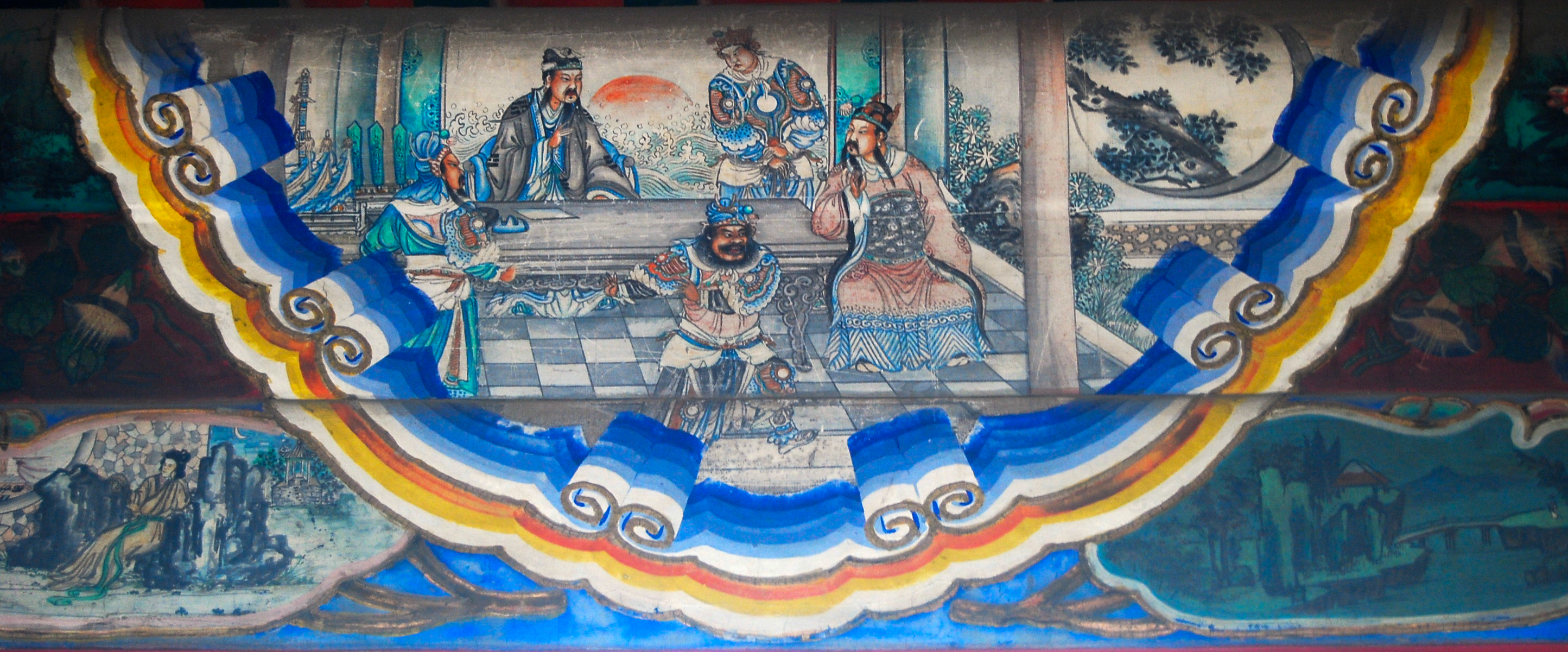
- A scene from the Romance of the Three Kingdoms illustrated in a mural of the Long Corridor in the Summer Palace, Beijing: Zhang Fei scoffs at the newcomer Zhuge Liang and reluctantly takes his orders
Date	202 CE
Location	Bowang (Bowang, Fangcheng County, Henan)
Result	Liu Bei victory

Belligerents
Forces of Liu Bei	Forces of Cao Cao

Commanders and leaders
Liu Bei; Zhao Yun	Xiahou Dun; Li Dian; Yu Jin

Battle of Bowang
- Traditional Chinese: 博望之戰
- Simplified Chinese: 博望之战
Transcriptions
Standard Mandarin
- Hanyu Pinyin: Bówàng Zhī Zhàn

Battle of Bowang Slope
- Traditional Chinese: 博望坡之戰
- Simplified Chinese: 博望坡之战
Transcriptions
Standard Mandarin
- Hanyu Pinyin: Bówàngpō Zhī Zhàn

The Battle of Bowang, also known as the Battle of Bowang Slope, was fought between the warlords Cao Cao and Liu Bei in 202 in the late Eastern Han dynasty.

== Background ==
Liu Bei originally sought refuge under the northern warlord Yuan Shao after being defeated by Cao Cao in 200 at Xu Province. However, he left Yuan Shao after the latter was defeated by Cao Cao at the Battle of Guandu in late 200, and went to Jing Province (covering present-day Hubei and Hunan) to seek shelter under the governor Liu Biao. Liu Biao initially welcomed Liu Bei and put him in charge of Xinye, but he gradually grew suspicious of Liu Bei as the latter became increasingly influential in Jing Province. As a result, Liu Biao sent Liu Bei to Bowang near Jing Province's northern border to defend against an invasion by Cao Cao.

At the same time, Cao Cao's forces were at war in northern China with Yuan Shao's remnant forces, led by Yuan's sons Yuan Tan, Yuan Xi and Yuan Shang. To counter Liu Bei's maneuvers, Cao Cao sent his generals Xiahou Dun, Li Dian and Yu Jin to lead an army south to attack Liu Bei.

== Battle ==
During the battle, Liu Bei suddenly set fire to his camp and retreated south. Xiahou Dun gave chase but Li Dian cautioned him, "I suspect that there's an ambush because the bandits (referring to Liu Bei's forces) are retreating for no reason. The paths to the south are narrow and the bushes are thick there. Do not pursue." Xiahou Dun ignored Li Dian's warning and left Li behind to guard the camp while he led the rest of his troops to pursue Liu Bei's retreating army. As predicted by Li Dian, Liu Bei did indeed set an ambush, and Xiahou Dun fell into the trap and was defeated. Li Dian's regiment came to Xiahou Dun's rescue and Liu Bei retreated after seeing Li Dian's reinforcements.

In the battle, Liu Bei's general Zhao Yun captured Xiahou Lan (夏侯蘭), an enemy commander who was from the same hometown as Zhao. Zhao Yun requested that Liu Bei spare Xiahou Lan's life and recommended Xiahou to be a military judge.

== In Romance of the Three Kingdoms ==
The battle is featured in Chapter 39 of the historical novel Romance of the Three Kingdoms by Luo Guanzhong.

Cao Cao sent Xiahou Dun to lead 100,000 troops to attack Liu Bei in Xinye. At that time, Zhuge Liang had just joined Liu Bei's forces and had not made any contributions yet. Liu Bei's sworn brothers Guan Yu and Zhang Fei were reluctant to follow Zhuge Liang's orders, so Zhuge borrowed Liu Bei's sword and official seal to establish his authority. He described the battle plan to counter Xiahou Dun's army: Guan Yu and Zhang Fei would each lead 1,000 men to wait in ambush on the left and right sides of Bowang respectively, and burn the enemy's supplies when they see fires burning at the south; Guan Ping and Liu Feng were tasked with setting fire to Bowang Slope when the enemy approached; Zhao Yun would lead the vanguard to lure the enemy into the ambush; Liu Bei would lead the backup force. Zhuge Liang also asked Liu Bei to prepare for victory celebrations.

When Xiahou Dun arrived at Bowang, he selected half of his troops to be the vanguard while the rest defended the supplies. Zhao Yun and Liu Bei consecutively came to challenge Xiahou Dun, then feigned defeat and retreated to lure Xiahou Dun to chase them. When Xiahou Dun personally led the pursuit, his deputy Han Hao cautioned him against ambushes, but Xiahou replied, "I see that the enemy is so weak. Even if they set ambushes on ten sides, I have nothing to fear." As Xiahou Dun ventured deeper into the valley, Liu Bei came to engage him again but retreated soon. Xiahou Dun laughed and said to Han Hao, "So this is the ambush you were talking about!", and then advanced towards Xinye.

During the pursuit, Yu Jin and Li Dian arrived at a narrow position, and a worried Li told Yu, "One who underestimates the enemy would certainly encounter defeat. The terrain here is rough, what if the enemy uses fire here?" Yu Jin understood Li Dian's concern and rode ahead to warn Xiahou Dun while Li tried to stop his men from moving further. Xiahou Dun suddenly realised the danger he was in and tried to retreat but Liu Bei's forces lying in ambush had already set fire to his surroundings. Strong winds helped to spread the fire as Xiahou Dun's troops panicked and stumbled on each other as they attempted to flee, while Zhao Yun turned around to attack the enemy. Xiahou Dun escaped by bashing through the flames and smoke. In the rear, Guan Yu and Zhang Fei's men set fire to Xiahou Dun's supplies as Han Hao and Xiahou Lan attempted to save the supplies. Xiahou Lan was slain by Zhang Fei while Han Hao fled, along with Li Dian and Yu Jin. The following morning, Xiahou Dun gathered his surviving soldiers and retreated back to Xuchang.

After the victory, Guan Yu and Zhang Fei changed their attitudes towards Zhuge Liang and treated him with full respect. Meanwhile, in Xuchang, Xiahou Dun bound himself and met Cao Cao, requesting death as punishment for his defeat, but Cao Cao forgave him and released him. Cao Cao also rewarded Li Dian and Yu Jin for their foresight.

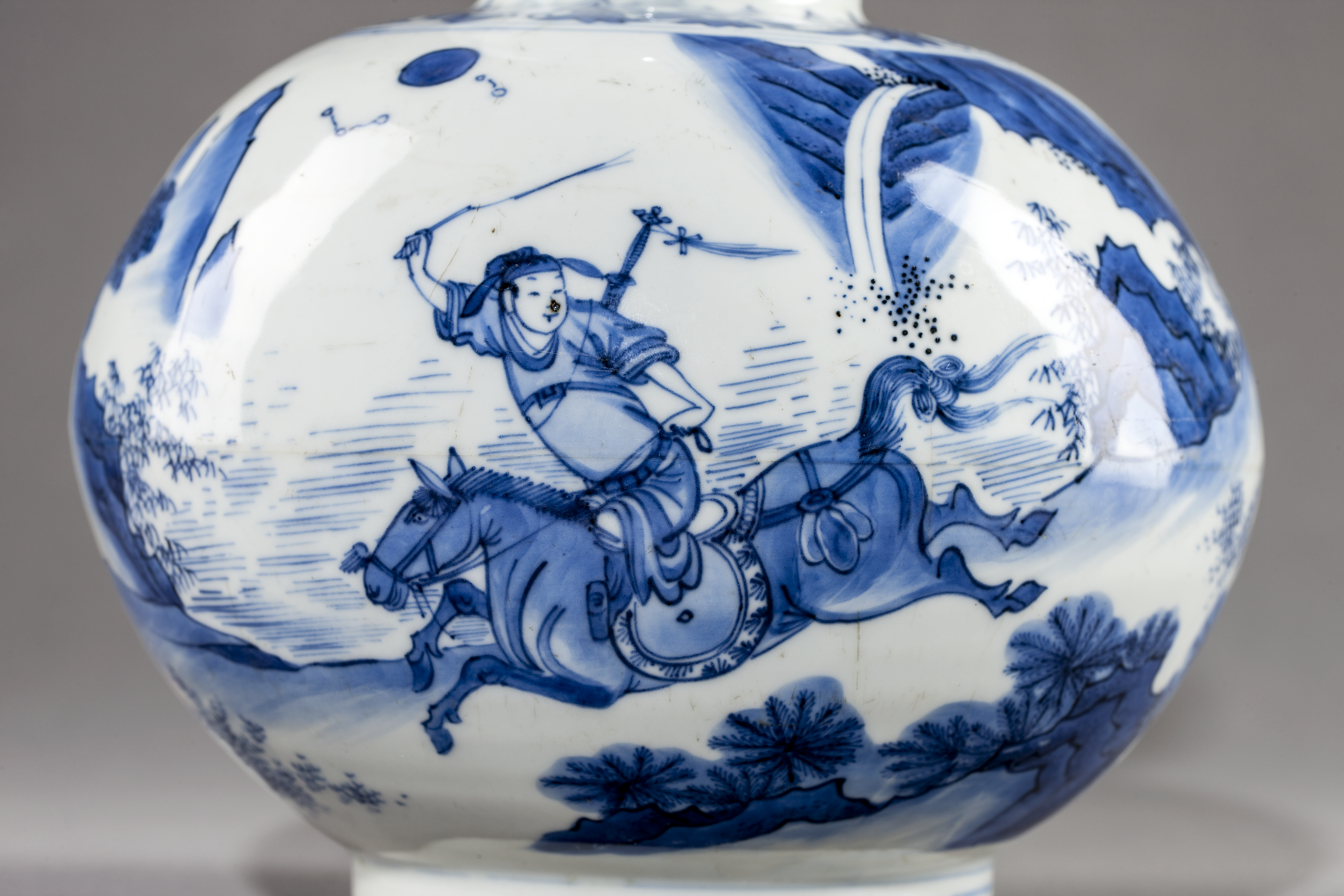
A soldier on horseback gallops towards Mount Bowang, 1627-1644 - Hallwyl Museum

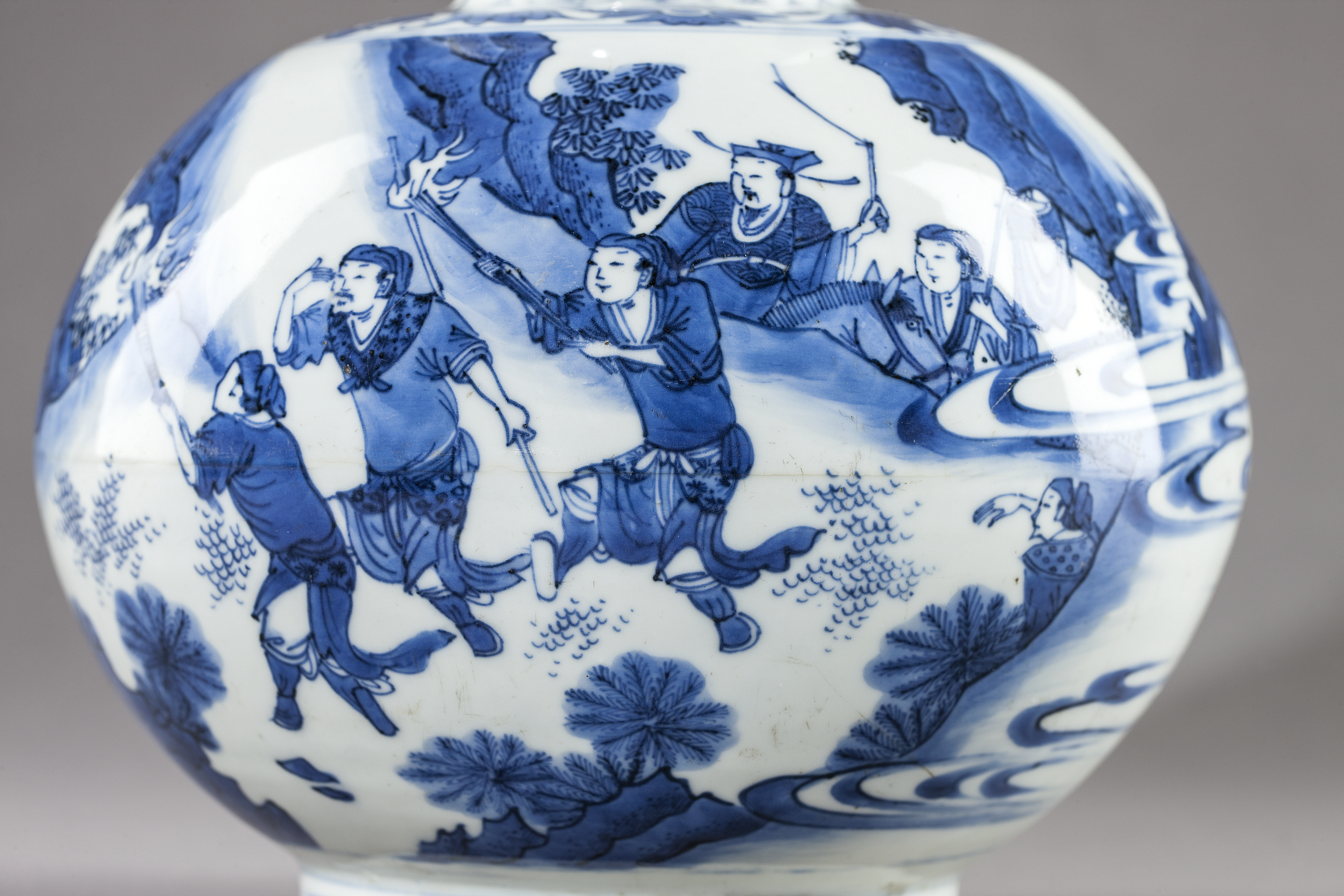
A soldier on horseback gallops towards Mount Bowang with troops behind him carrying flaming torches, 1627-1644 - Hallwyl Museum

=== Historicity ===
Liu Bei's biography in the Sanguozhi mentioned that Liu Bei resisted Xiahou Dun and Yu Jin at Bowang. He prepared an ambush and set fire to his own camp and pretended to retreat. Xiahou Dun pursued Liu Bei and fell into the ambush and was defeated. Besides, although both Liu Bei and Zhuge Liang's biographies did not specify the year in which Zhuge Liang joined Liu Bei's forces, Zhuge Liang was mentioned in Liu Bei's biography only after the Battle of Bowang. There was no mention about Zhuge Liang's involvement in the battle.

== In popular culture ==
The battle provided a basis for many skits in the different types of Chinese opera. For example, it was featured in Cantonese opera and zaju (variety plays).

The battle was also featured in many Three Kingdoms-themed video games such as Capcom's Warriors of Fate, Koei's Sangokushi Koumeiden, Sangokushi Sousouden, and Dynasty Warriors 4. The battle is the first stage in Warriors of Fate and Sangokushi Koumeiden.

The ancient battleground of Bowang is now designated a county-level heritage, where a stone monument commemorates the battle. Broken halberds and ashes of grains were discovered there, and were archaeologically determined to be from the late Han dynasty.
