= Ding Yi (Han dynasty) =

Chinese official serving warlord Cao Cao (died 220)

- 丁儀

Right Assistant Security Officer (右刺奸掾)
- In office ? – 220
- Monarch: Emperor Xian of Han
- Chancellor: Cao Cao

Assistant Officer in the West Bureau (西曹掾)
- In office ?–?
- Monarch: Emperor Xian of Han
- Chancellor: Cao Cao

Personal details
- Born: Unknown Suixi County, Anhui
- Died: 220
- Relations: Ding Yì (brother)
- Parent: Ding Chong (father)
- Occupation: Official
- Courtesy name: Zhengli (正禮)

Ding Yi (died 220), courtesy name Zhengli, was an official serving under the warlord Cao Cao during the late Eastern Han dynasty of China.

== Life ==
Ding Yi was from Pei State (沛國), which is around present-day Suixi County, Anhui. His father, Ding Chong (丁沖), was an old acquaintance of Cao Cao, the warlord who controlled the Han central government and the figurehead Emperor Xian from 196 to 220. Ding Chong served as the Colonel-Director of Retainers (司隸校尉) in Cao Cao's administration.

After Ding Chong's death, Cao Cao wanted to arrange for Ding Yi to marry one of his daughters, Princess Qinghe (清河公主). However, Cao Cao's eldest surviving son, Cao Pi, strongly opposed because Ding Yi had an eye disorder which affected his physical appearance and hence made him an unsuitable spouse for Princess Qinghe. Cao Pi then suggested to his father to let Princess Qinghe marry Xiahou Mao instead; Cao Cao agreed.

Ding Yi hated Cao Pi for spoiling his chance of becoming Cao Cao's son-in-law, so he grew determined to oppose Cao Pi. He became close to Cao Pi's younger brother Cao Zhi, who was Cao Pi's rival in a power struggle over the succession to their father's position as a vassal king under the Han Empire. Also, he spread rumours which caused the execution of Cui Yan, and the downfall of Mao Jie and Xu Yi. On the other hand, He Kui (何夔) was an official who persisted in his honesty when interacting with Ding Yi, even after being advised to compromise by Fu Xun.

Along with Yang Xiu and others, Ding Yi often sang praises of Cao Zhi in front of Cao Cao in the hope of helping Cao Zhi earn his father's favour. However, Cao Zhi ultimately lost to Cao Pi, whom Cao Cao officially designated as his heir apparent.

Cao Cao initially assigned Ding Yi to be an Assistant Officer in the West Bureau (西曹掾). After Cao Pi became the heir apparent, Ding Yi was reassigned to be a Right Assistant Security Officer (右刺奸掾). Cao Cao noted Ding Yi's literary talent and once regretted his decision to reject Ding Yi as a son-in-law. At the same time, Cao Pi ordered Ding Yi to commit suicide, but Ding Yi refused. Ding kowtowed to Xiahou Shang and asked the latter to plead with Cao Pi for mercy, but Cao Pi refused to agree to Xiahou Shang's request.

In 220, following Cao Cao's death, Cao Pi inherited his father's position as a vassal king of Wei of the Han Empire; one of the first things he did after coming to power was to have Ding Yi and his entire family executed. (Note: Cao Zhi's biography in Records of the Three Kingdoms recorded that only the male members were all executed.)

== Family ==
Ding Yi had a similarly named younger brother, Ding Yi (丁廙; Dīng Yì; note the different Chinese character for Yi), whose courtesy name was Jingli (敬禮).

== See also ==
- Lists of people of the Three Kingdoms
