= Xiahou Dun =

Chinese Han dynasty general (died 220)

- 夏侯惇
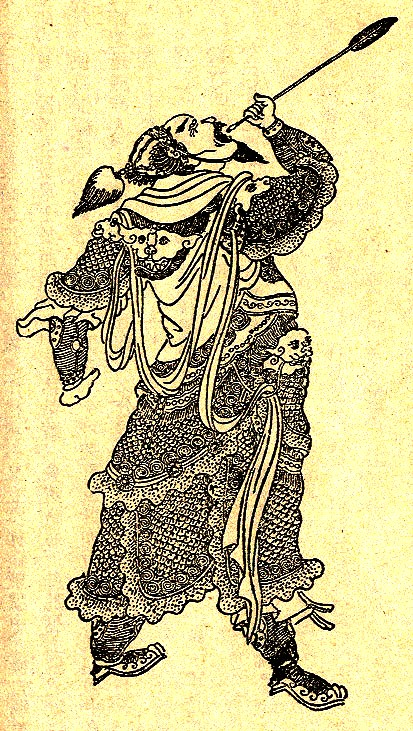
- A Qing dynasty illustration of Xiahou Dun swallowing his eyeball

General-in-Chief (大將軍)
- In office April 23, 220 – June 13, 220
- Monarch: Emperor Xian of Han
- Chancellor: Cao Pi

General of the Vanguard (前將軍)
- In office 219 – April 23, 220
- Monarch: Emperor Xian of Han
- Chancellor: Cao Cao / Cao Pi

General Who Calms the Waves (伏波將軍)
- In office 204 – 219
- Monarch: Emperor Xian of Han
- Chancellor: Cao Cao (from 208)

Intendant of Henan (河南尹)

General Who Builds Martial Might (建武將軍).

Administrator (太守) of Jiyin Commandery (濟陰)

Administrator (太守) of Dong Commandery (東郡)
- In office 192 – ?
- Preceded by: Cao Cao

Colonel Who Breaks and Charges (折衝校尉)

Major (司馬)
- In office 190 – ?

Personal details
- Born: Unknown Bozhou, Anhui
- Died: 13 June 220 (Note: Xiahou Dun's death date was recorded in Cao Pi's biography in the Sanguozhi. It stated: "General-in-Chief Xiahou Dun died on the gengwu day in the 4th month of the 1st year of the Yankang era." This date is based on the Chinese calendar and the sexagenary cycle, and corresponds to 13 June 220 in the Gregorian calendar. "Yankang" (延康) was the era name of the last seven months of the reign of Emperor Xian of the Han dynasty before Cao Pi forced Emperor Xian to abdicate in his favour and established the state of Cao Wei.)
- Children: Xiahou Chong; Xiahou Mao; Xiahou Zizang; Xiahou Zijiang; at least three other sons
- Relatives: Xiahou Lian (brother); Xiahou Yuan (cousin)
- Occupation: Military general, politician
- Courtesy name: Yuanrang (元讓)
- Posthumous name: Marquis Zhong (忠侯)
- Peerage: Marquis of Gao'an District (高安鄉侯)
- Nickname: "Blind Xiahou" (盲夏侯)

Chinese name
- Traditional Chinese: 夏侯惇
Transcriptions
Standard Mandarin
- Hanyu Pinyin: Xiàhóu Dūn
- Wade–Giles: Hsia^{4}-hou^{2} Tun^{1}
Middle Chinese
- Middle Chinese: ɦˠa^{X}-ɦəu tuən
Old Chinese
- Zhengzhang: *ɡraːʔ ɡoː tuːn

Xiahou Dun (died 13 June 220), courtesy name Yuanrang, was a Chinese military general and politician serving under the warlord Cao Cao during the late Eastern Han dynasty of China. He served for a few months under Cao Cao's successor, Cao Pi, before his death. As one of Cao Cao's most trusted generals, Xiahou Dun aided the warlord in his campaigns against Lü Bu, Liu Bei, Sun Quan and others.

Xiahou Dun lost his left eye when he was a hit by a stray arrow during a battle against Lü Bu in the late 190s, and subsequently became known among the army as "Blind Xiahou".

== Early life ==
Xiahou Dun was from Qiao County (譙縣), Pei State (沛國), in present-day Bozhou, Anhui. He was a descendant of Xiahou Ying, who served under the Han dynasty's founding emperor, Liu Bang (Emperor Gao). Though the family hadn't reached national prominence in the centuries since, they were a leading family in Pei, often intermarrying down the generations with the other prominent local Ding and Cao clans. Xiahou Dun first gained recognition when he killed a man who insulted his teacher when he was 13 years old.

In the 180s, possibly when Cao Cao was appointed Cavalry Commandant to help fight Yellow Turbans in Yingchuan, Xiahou Dun helped Cao Cao raise troops, and from then on would follow him across many a battle as his second in command. In 190, when Cao Cao was raising an army to participate in the campaign against Dong Zhuo, Xiahou Dun became his Major (司馬), and when they were defeated by Xu Rong at Suanzao, Xiahou Dun went with Cao Cao to recruit more troops in Yang Province, though they would face a mutiny among their new soldiers. Xiahou Dun was sent to garrison Boma (白馬; near present-day Hua County, Henan), later promoted to Colonel Who Breaks and Charges (折衝校尉), and as Cao Cao became Governor of Yan in 192, Dun succeeded him as the Administrator (太守) of Dong Commandery (東郡; the areas around present-day Puyang, Henan and Liaocheng, Shandong).

== Defence of Yan Province ==
In 193, Cao Cao left his base in Yan Province on a campaign against Tao Qian, the Governor of Xu Province, whom he held responsible for the murder of his father Cao Song. Xiahou Dun was left behind in Dong commandery, stationed to hold its capital Puyang.

While Cao Cao was away in Xu Province, his subordinates Zhang Miao and Chen Gong rebelled in Yan Province and invited the warlord Lü Bu to take Yan. However, Zhang Miao's attempt to reassure Xun Yu of Lü Bu's intent instead tipped Xun Yu off to the revolt, prompting Xun Yu to write to Xiahou Dun requesting that he reinforce Juancheng County. Xiahou Dun led a lightly armed force towards Juancheng, but he encountered Lü Bu's army on the way and engaged the enemy in battle. Lü Bu withdrew his forces and took advantage of Xiahou Dun's absence to conquer Puyang, capturing much of Xiahou's supplies and equipment. Lü Bu later sent his men to pretend to surrender to Xiahou Dun, who fell for the ruse and was taken hostage by the enemy in his own camp. Lü Bu's men demanded a heavy ransom, and Xiahou Dun's troops panicked, but Xiahou Dun's personally recruited subordinate Han Hao settled the troops and ordered an attack on the surprised hostage-takers, who surrendered. Han Hao had them executed, and Xiahou Dun was rescued.

Xiahou Dun then continued eastwards to Juancheng, reinforcing the small garrison there where a number of military officials had been plotting to join the revolt. The night he arrived, Xiahou Dun executed the plotters and settled the army. He also urged Xun Yu not to endanger himself by meeting with the wavering Inspector of Yu Province, Guo Gong, whose army had camped outside the city gates, as Dun feared the consequences of losing such a prominent official as Xun Yu. Xun Yu, however, went out and was able to persuade Guo Gong to withdraw. Xiahou Dun, Xun Yu and the local official Cheng Yu would comprise the core of the Cao loyalists preserving the slim remnant Cao holdings in eastern Yan.

When Cao Cao learned of the rebellion, he withdrew his army from Xu Province and returned to Yan Province to attack Lü Bu. Xiahou Dun participated in the campaign and was struck in the left eye by a stray arrow during a skirmish. As a result, when Dun and his cousin Xiahou Yuan had both reached the rank of General (putting this from 209 onwards), he was given the nickname "Blind Xiahou" (盲夏侯) in Cao Cao's army. Xiahou Dun hated this nickname and would throw a mirror to the ground whenever he saw his own reflection. Lü Bu and Cao Cao fought near Puyang for over one-hundred days, during which time Xiahou Dun's Major Dian Wei distinguished himself and was transferred to Cao Cao's personal guard. Eventually, famine forced both armies to withdraw, and in 195 Cao Cao drove Lü Bu out of Yan.

== Mid-career ==
Xiahou Dun was appointed as the Administrator (太守) of Chenliu (陳留; around present-day Kaifeng, Henan) commandery, the area once under Zhang Miao's control, where had a falling out with his personally appointed Reporting Officer Wei Zhen around 200. Xiahou Dun invited Wei Zhen to bring his wife out to the feast, to which Wei Zhen strongly objected to as inappropriate to the fury of Xiahou Dun who had his subordinate jailed but soon released him. Then to Jiyin (濟陰; near present-day Dingtao County, Shandong) commandery, and held the rank of General Who Builds Martial Might (建武將軍). He was also enfeoffed as the Marquis of Gao'an District (高安鄉侯). While he was in office, a drought broke out and there was a locust infestation in the region. To counter these problems, Xiahou Dun spearheaded an agricultural program, in which he instructed workers to dam up the Taishou River (太壽水; a tributary of the Huai River) to create a large pond. He personally participated in the construction works and also encouraged the people to grow crops in the inundated land. This program greatly aided the people during those years of severe famine. He was later reassigned to be the Intendant of Henan (河南尹). In 198 Xiahou Dun was dispatched to Xu to reinforce the allied Liu Bei, who was under attack from Gao Shun on the orders of Lü Bu, but Gao Shun defeated Xiahou Dun then would drive out Liu Bei.

Xiahou Dun did not participate in Cao Cao's campaigns in northern China against Yuan Shao, Yuan's sons and their allies throughout the 200s CE. Instead, he held Henan, possibly the campaign being when he was made Intendant of Henan, helping keep Cao Cao's western flank secure and holding the Meng ford to protect the Ao Granary. In 202, Cao Cao's rival Liu Bei, who had sought refuge under Jing Province's governor Liu Biao, launched a series of raids into Cao Cao's lands. In response, Cao Cao sent Xiahou Dun, Yu Jin and Li Dian to lead an army to resist Liu Bei, both sides clashed at the Battle of Bowang. Liu Bei burnt his camps and feigned retreat to lure the enemy into an ambush. Xiahou Dun and his men fell for the trick and were defeated in the ambush. Li Dian, who warned Xiahou Dun about the danger of an ambush and did not join in the pursuit, led reinforcements to help Xiahou Dun and Yu Jin. Liu Bei withdrew his forces after seeing Li Dian's approach and the raid stopped.

After the Battle of Ye in 204, Xiahou Dun was promoted to General Who Calms the Waves (伏波將軍) but retained his appointment as the Intendant of Henan with the freedom to act on his own initiative without being restricted by regulations. In 205, Gao Gan encouraged revolts in Hedong with Wei Gu holding the Shan crossing and local loyal forces unable to cross, Xiahou Dun was sent but before he could arrive, Du Ji persuaded Xiahou Dun to let him go across with a small escort and plot with the local loyalists. On 21 March 207, as Cao Cao prepared to attack the remnants of the Yuan family, he rewarded 20 of his officers with greater enoffments with Xiahou Dun granted an additional 1,800 taxable households in his marquisate in recognition of his contributions, bringing the total number of households to 2,500. Xiahou Dun befriended Tian Chou and would be sent by Cao Cao to, unsuccessfully, persuade Tian Chou to take up honors for his service In 213, Xiahou Dun would be one of the signatories calling for Cao Cao to become Duke of Wei.

== Later life and death ==
Xiahou Dun accompanied the 215 campaign in Hanzhong against the theocratic warlord Zhang Lu but Cao Cao's forces struggled against Zhang Wei's forces. According to Dong Zhao's account, Cao Cao issued orders to recall with Xiahou Dun and Xu Chu were sent to bring the troops back from the hills. In the confusion, some of the returning troops got lost in the night and surprised some of the defenders who fled from their position. This was reported back to Xiahou Dun and, with some not believing it, Xiahou Dun rode forward to see for himself then went back to tell Cao Cao so they could exploit it, Zhang Wei's position collapsed and Zhang Lu soon surrendered. In 216, he accompanied Cao Cao to Juchao (居巢; in present-day Chaohu, Anhui) against southern rival Sun Quan but met with stalemate. In 217, Cao Cao withdrew but left behind Xiahou Dun as Area Commander in command of 26 juns (軍) (Note: A jun was a military unit comprising 12,500 soldiers. However, the number of troops under Xiahou Dun's command might not add up to 325,000 because there was some flexibility in forming a jun.) until Sun Quan negotiated terms including an acceptance of Cao Cao as King. As a reward for his contributions including at Juchao, he received a number of performing dancers and musicians. The imperial order that came with the reward read: "When Wei Jiang (魏絳) pacified the Rong people, he was only rewarded with gold and riches. Don't you, General, deserve more than him?"

In 219, when Cao Cao marched to Mobei (摩陂; southeast of present-day Jia County, Henan) in response to Guan Yu's attack, he treated Xiahou Dun with exceptional honors that no other officer received, by letting Xiahou ride in the same carriage and allowing Xiahou to enter Cao Cao's private quarters. At the time, Emperor Xian had made Cao Cao a vassal king under the title "King of Wei" (魏王) and granted him permission to set up an independent vassal kingdom, which was still nominally under Han imperial control. While many of Cao Cao's subordinates had been appointed to positions in his vassal kingdom, Xiahou Dun still held appointments under the Han central government. Xiahou Dun requested to serve in Cao Cao's vassal kingdom to show his loyalty, but Cao Cao told him, "I heard that the best rulers learn from their subjects while the second best befriend their subjects. Officials are noble men of virtue. Why lower yourself to serve such a small kingdom like Wei?" Xiahou Dun insisted, so Cao Cao appointed him as General of the Vanguard (前將軍). Xiahou Dun then returned soldiers to Shouchun (壽春) and later garrisoned at Zhaoling (召陵).

Around late 219, Xiahou Dun, along with Chen Qun, Huan Jie and others, urged Cao Cao to take the throne from Emperor Xian. Xiahou Dun said, "Everyone in the Empire knows that the Han dynasty's lifespan has come to an end and that there are many contenders seeking to replace it. Since ancient times, whoever succeeds in eliminating the people's troubles will win the hearts of the people and become their ruler. As of now, Your Highness has been fighting battles for over 30 years, you've made outstanding achievements and the hearts of the people are with you. You should follow the will of Heaven and the people. What's there to hesitate about?" Cao Cao replied, "'These qualities are displayed in government. This then also constitutes the exercise of government.' (Note: The first two sentences in Cao Cao's reply to Xiahou Dun were quoted from Chapter 2 of Confucius's Analects.) If the Mandate of Heaven does belong to me, I'll be like King Wen of Zhou." (Note: Ji Chang (King Wen of Zhou) was a vassal lord under Di Xin of the Shang dynasty even though he controlled more territory than the king. After his death, his son Ji Fa (later King Wu of Zhou) overthrew the Shang dynasty, established the Zhou dynasty, and became its first king. Ji Fa posthumously honoured his father as "King Wen of Zhou". When Cao Cao said he preferred to be like King Wen, he was actually hinting that he would not take the throne from Emperor Xian for as long as he lived – just as King Wen of Zhou never replaced Di Xin – and instead leave the task to his successor – in the same way as how King Wu of Zhou overthrew Di Xin.)

Cao Cao died in March 220 and passed on his vassal king title to his son, Cao Pi, who was still a nominal subject of Emperor Xian. Xiahou Dun was promoted to General-in-Chief (大將軍) on 23 April. He died less than two months later on 13 June with Cao Pi leading the mourning ceremony at Ye's east gate.

The Cao Man Zhuan (曹瞞傳) and the Shiyu (世語) mentioned that Xiahou Dun once suggested to Cao Cao to eliminate Liu Bei first in order to force Sun Quan to surrender of his own accord, and then follow in the footsteps of the mythological rulers Shun and Yu by making Emperor Xian voluntarily abdicate the throne to him. Cao Cao accepted his proposal. After Cao Cao's death, Xiahou Dun regretted his words and fell sick and died. The historian Sun Sheng dismissed the Shiyu account as nonsense, saying that it did not match what was recorded in the main text of Xiahou Dun's biography in the Sanguozhi – Xiahou Dun felt ashamed of serving under the Han imperial court so he requested to serve in Cao Cao's vassal kingdom.

== Family ==
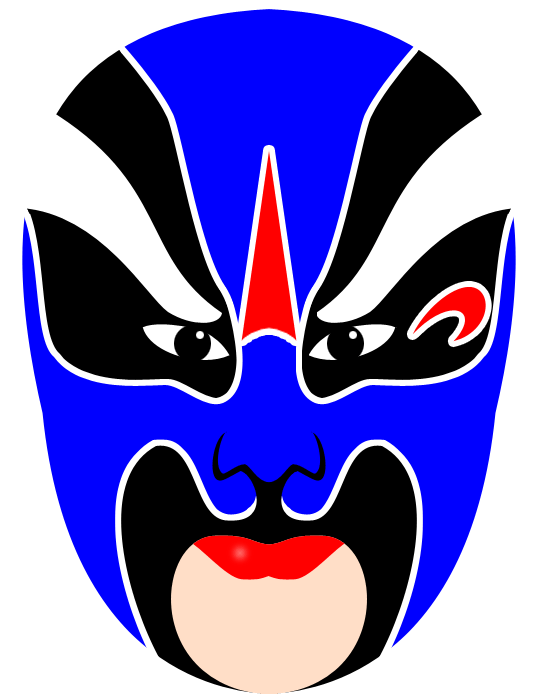
Facial makeup of Xiahou Dun in the Peking opera Mount Dingjun. The blue base tone is used to reflect his upright and courageous personality.

In late 220, Cao Pi forced Emperor Xian to abdicate the throne in his favour and established the state of Cao Wei, marking the end of the Han dynasty and the start of the Three Kingdoms period.

Cao Pi granted Xiahou Dun the posthumous title "Marquis Zhong" (忠侯), which literally means "loyal marquis". Xiahou Dun's original marquis title, "Marquis of Gao'an District" (高安鄉侯), was inherited by his son, Xiahou Chong (夏侯充). Later, in recognition of Xiahou Dun's past contributions, Cao Pi added 1,000 taxable households to Xiahou Chong's marquisate and made each of Xiahou Dun's seven sons and two grandsons a Secondary Marquis (關內侯). Cao Rui on 7 June 233 started sacrifices at the Ancestral Temple to a few select figures who had helped create a dynasty; Xiahou Dun was one of the three.

Xiahou Dun's younger brother, Xiahou Lian (夏侯廉), was also enfeoffed as a marquis. Xiahou Dun's second son, Xiahou Mao, married one of Cao Cao's daughters, Princess Qinghe (清河公主), and held high-ranking positions in the Wei imperial court. Xiahou Dun also had two other sons—Xiahou Zizang (夏侯子臧) and Xiahou Zijiang (夏侯子江).

When Xiahou Chong died, his marquis title was inherited by his son, Xiahou Yu (夏侯廙). Xiahou Yu, in turn, was succeeded by his son Xiahou Shao (夏侯劭). According to the Jin Yang Qiu (晉陽秋) by Jin historian Sun Sheng, Xiahou Dun did not have any successor after his grandson, Xiahou Zuo (夏侯佐), died in 266. But the first Jin emperor Emperor Wu ordered that a kinsman be found to continue the line of such a distinguished servant in Cao Wei's founding.

== Appraisal ==
Although Xiahou Dun was often in the military, he ensured he had teachers come to help him study. He led a frugal and simple lifestyle and used his excess wealth to help the needy. He took from official treasuries (instead of directly from the common people) when he did not have enough money. He also did not own much property.

== Records of the Three Kingdoms In Plain Language ==
In Records of the Three Kingdoms in Plain Language, published in the 13th century, as part of a series of historical fiction, he serves as a brave warrior who is prone to being lured into fake retreat duels. Xiahou first appears when Zhang Fei arrives in Cao Cao's camp, for the second time, seeking help against Lü Bu. Xiahou Dun calls out to Zhang Fei and was delighted to get a meeting, and was appointed vanguard. Xiahou then duels Lü Bu, who faked defeat and when Xiahou Dun pursued, shot Xiahou Dun in the left eye. Dismounting, Xiahou Dun pulled out the arrow with the famous line, held the eye in his mouth and returns to fighting an astonished Lü Bu, who is forced to retreat.

Xiahou Dun survived longer in this work than he did historically. In Zhuge Liang's first northern campaign, Xiahou Dun held the key pass at Jieting and heard Jiang Wei had placed his camp in a dangerous position. Only worried about Zhuge Liang, he considered Jiang Wei a stupid little boy and launched a surprise attack at night, only to fall into an ambush led by Wei Yan; Xiahou Dun fled with Jieting lost. At Chang'an, he informed Emperor Cao Fang, who would then appoint Sima Yi to oppose Zhuge Liang.

== In Romance of the Three Kingdoms ==
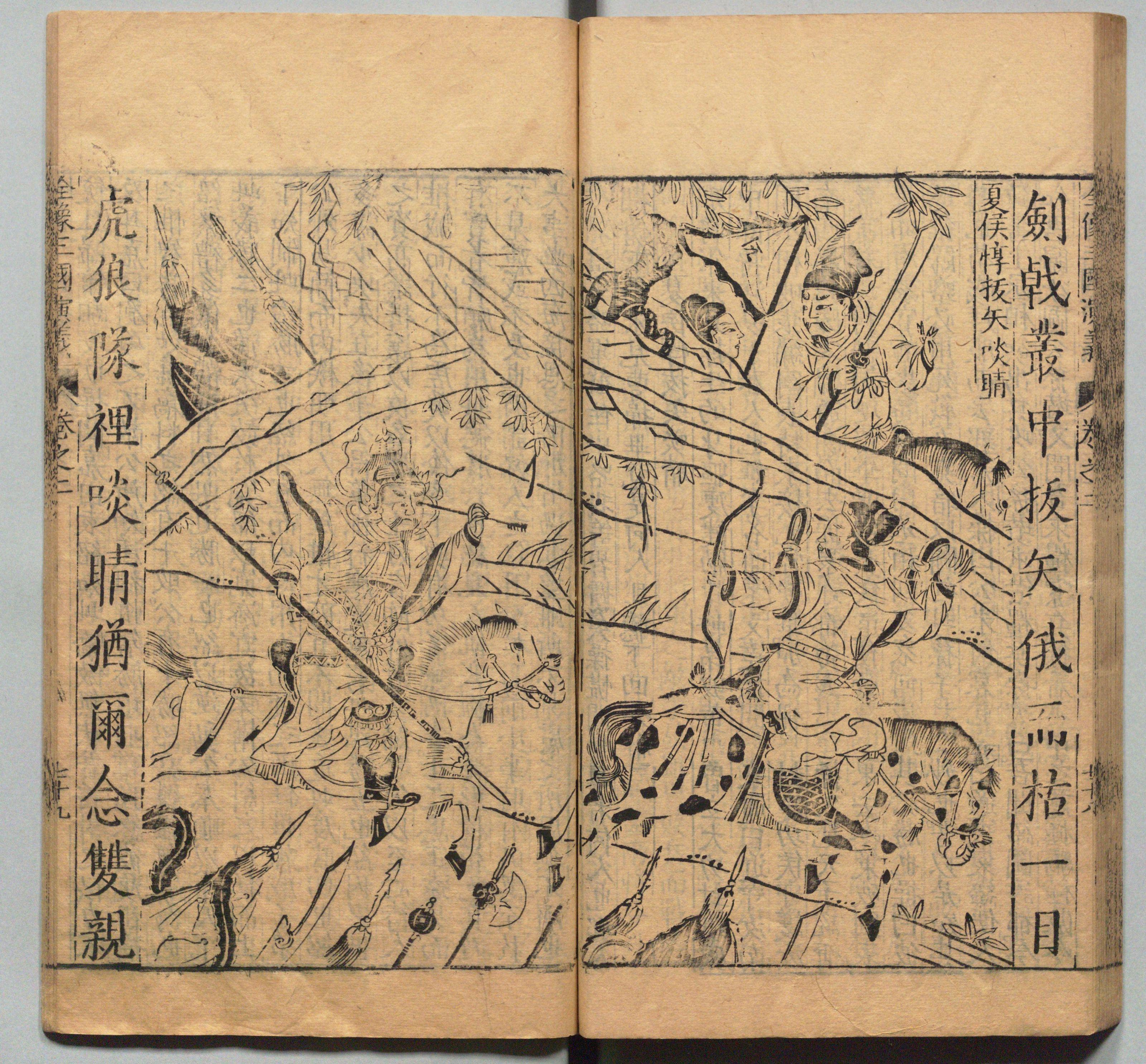
Ming dynasty woodblock illustration of Xiahou Dun being shot in the eye with an arrow.

Xiahou Dun is featured as a character in the 14th-century historical novel Romance of the Three Kingdoms, which romanticises the historical events before and during the Three Kingdoms period.

See the following for some fictitious stories in Romance of the Three Kingdoms involving Xiahou Dun:

- Battle of Xiapi#Xiahou Dun losing his left eye
- Battle of Bowang#In fiction

== In popular culture ==
In Chinese plays called zaju, Xiahou Dun is often assigned the role of the clown to be defeated by Shu heroes, be it Zhuge Liang at Bowang or being shown up by Guan Yu at Boma. In the 15th century play by Ming Prince Zhu Youdun called Guan Yunchangs's (Guan Yu's style name) Righteous and Brave Refusal of Gold, Xiahou Dun's introduction is boasting he has never been victorious, scared when facing fortifications, he fears the blade and runs from arrows. Blinded in Xu, left leg crippled by Zhang Liao at Puyang, he fears for more injury. He panics on hearing of Yan Liang's challenge to battle, dismisses Yan Liang for wearing so much armor when his troops use no weapons other than garlic, a word play on plans, having misunderstood the Art of War. Defeated in just a few bouts, he pleads for Guan Yu's help, then claims the credit for the victory. He then slanders Guan Yu to Cao Cao in the hopes Guan Yu would be killed, warning Cao Cao Guan Yu will leave so should kill him, but Cao Cao ignores him. Then tries to claim credit with Guan Yu for the rewards. Ordered by Cao Cao to give the departing Guan Yu a banquet in the final act, ignores orders and tries to murder the sleeping, drunk Guan Yu. But Guan Yu awakes, terrifying the overpowered Xiahou Dun who is spared by Guan Yu.

Xiahou Dun is featured as a playable character in Koei's Dynasty Warriors video game series, as well as Warriors Orochi, a crossover between Dynasty Warriors and Samurai Warriors. He also appears in all installments of Koei's Romance of the Three Kingdoms strategy game series.

There is a card based on Xiahou Dun, called "Xiahou Dun, the One-Eyed", in the Portal Three Kingdoms set of the Magic: The Gathering collectible card game.

The anime Battle Vixens, Koihime Musō, and Yuyushiki also make references to Xiahou Dun, in which he is known by his Japanese name "Kakōton".

Xiahou Dun also appears as a playable character in Total War: Three Kingdoms, and is prominently featured in the game as a general in the service of Cao Cao.

== See also ==
- Lists of people of the Three Kingdoms
