= Dian Wei =

Military officer under Cao Cao (died 197)

- 典韋
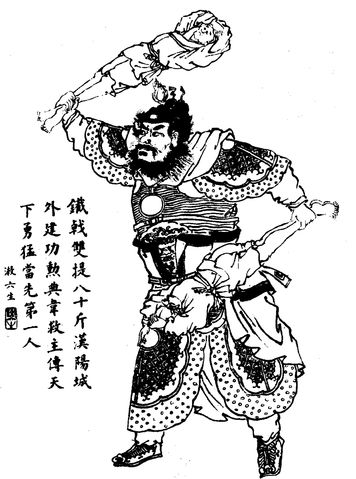
- A Qing dynasty illustration of Dian Wei

Colonel (校尉) (under Cao Cao)
- In office ? – 197
- Monarch: Emperor Xian of Han

Commandant (都尉) (under Cao Cao)
- In office ?–?
- Monarch: Emperor Xian of Han

Major (司馬) (under Cao Cao)
- In office ?–?
- Monarch: Emperor Xian of Han

Personal details
- Born: Unknown Ningling County, Henan
- Died: February or March 197 (Note: Dian Wei's biography in the Sanguozhi recorded that he was killed during the Battle of Wancheng, but did not give details on his time of death. According to Cao Cao's biography in the Sanguozhi, the Battle of Wancheng took place in the 1st month of the 2nd year of the Jian'an era of the reign of Emperor Xian of the Eastern Han dynasty. This month corresponds to 5 February to 6 March 197 in the Gregorian calendar.) Wancheng District, Nanyang, Henan
- Children: Dian Man
- Occupation: Military officer

Dian Wei (died February or March 197) was a military general serving under the warlord Cao Cao in the late Eastern Han dynasty of China. Famed for his enormous strength, Dian Wei excelled at wielding a pair of jis (a halberd-like weapon), each of which was said to weigh 40 jin. He was killed in action at the Battle of Wancheng while covering Cao Cao's escape from Zhang Xiu's forces.

== Background ==
Dian Wei was from Jiwu County (己吾縣), Chenliu Commandery (陳留郡), in present-day Ningling County, Henan. He was described as a stalwart man with great strength and the ambition of becoming a youxia (vigilante).

== Assassinating Li Yong ==
When he was young, Dian Wei once agreed to help a certain Liu family in Xiangyi County (襄邑縣; present-day Sui County, Henan) take revenge against one Li Yong (李永). As Li Yong was a former county chief, (Note: Li Yong (李永) was from Suiyang County (睢陽縣; present-day Suiyang District, Shangqiu, Henan). He previously served as the Chief (長) of Fuchun County (富春縣; in present-day Hangzhou, Zhejiang).) he had bodyguards to protect him during his travels.

Dian Wei disguised himself as a marquis and travelled to Li Yong's house in a carriage filled with food and wine. He entered the house without challenge, stabbed Li Yong with a concealed dagger, and killed Li Yong's wife as well. He then left the house and retrieved his weapons (a sword and a ji) from the carriage and walked away. As Li Yong lived near the marketplace, news of his death spread quickly and the whole town was shocked. Hundreds of men went to pursue the murderer but none of them dared to approach Dian Wei. After travelling four or five li on foot, Dian Wei met his companions and they escaped after a brief fight with the pursuers. Dian Wei became recognised as a hero after this incident.

== Service under Cao Cao ==
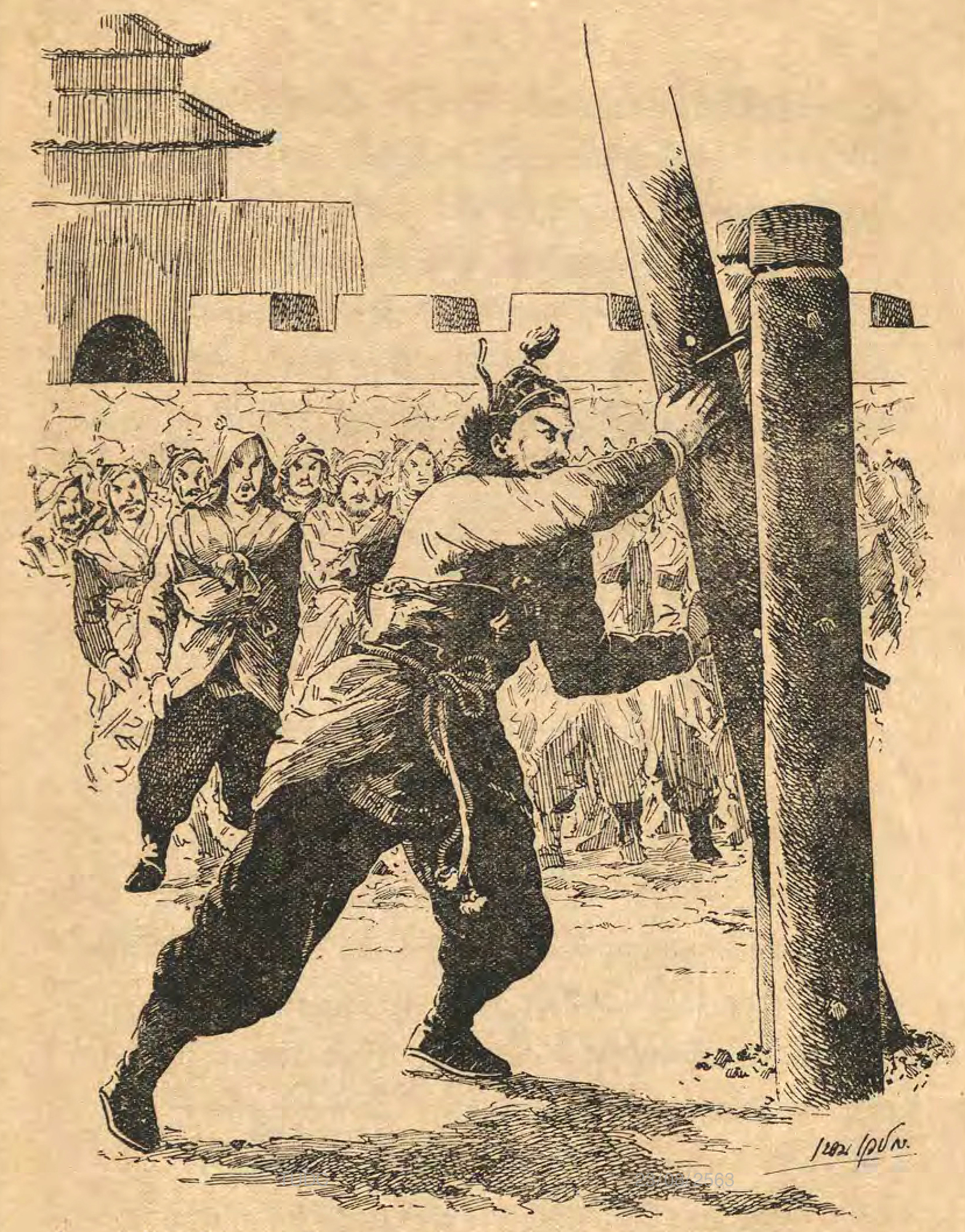
Dian Wei sets up a banner pole. Illustration by Hem Vejakorn (c. 1944).

Around February or March 190, when the regional official Zhang Miao was rallying an army to join the campaign against Dong Zhuo, Dian Wei answered the call and became a subordinate of Zhao Chong (趙寵), a military officer serving under Zhang Miao. Once, a large banner was swaying in the strong wind and many men could not stop it from swaying despite their combined efforts. Dian Wei used only one hand to grab the banner pole and succeeded in keeping it upright. Zhao Chong was very impressed with Dian Wei's strength.

Dian Wei later became a subordinate of Xiahou Dun, a general under the warlord Cao Cao. He was promoted to the rank of Major (司馬) for his valour in battle.

=== Battle of Puyang ===
Around September 194, when Cao Cao was at war with a rival warlord Lü Bu in Yan Province, he launched a surprise night raid on one of Lü Bu's camps located 40-50 li west of Puyang County and destroyed it before dawn. Just as Cao Cao and his troops were planning to return to their base, Lü Bu personally led reinforcements from Puyang County to attack them and caught them in an onrush.

Dian Wei ordered dozens of men to gather around him, put on two layers of armour, discard their shields and arm themselves only with spears and jis. Another wave of enemy soldiers closing in from the west unleashed a barrage of arrows onto Dian Wei and his men. Dian Wei remained oblivious to the arrows and told his men, "Let me know when the enemy is ten paces away." The men did so. Dian Wei then said again, "Let me know when they are five paces away." The men then suddenly cried out in fear, "The enemy is upon us!" Dian Wei was holding on to a dozen jis, and he flung them at the enemy when they approached him. Each ji knocked down an enemy soldier and not a single one missed its target.

As the sun rose, Lü Bu retreated back to Puyang while Cao Cao withdrew back to his base as well. Cao Cao was so impressed with Dian Wei that he promoted him to the rank of Commandant (都尉) and put him in command of hundreds of his personal bodyguards who patrolled the areas around his tent.

=== As Cao Cao's bodyguard ===
Dian Wei was a robustly built fighter. He personally selected the soldiers who would serve under him. In battle, Dian Wei and his men were always the first to charge into the enemy formation. Dian Wei was later promoted to the rank of Colonel (校尉).

Dian Wei was known for being a loyal, prudent and responsible man. He often stood guard outside Cao Cao's tent from morning until dusk, and even at night he would sleep beside Cao Cao's tent, and he rarely returned to his own quarters. He was also a heavy eater and drinker, eating in huge mouthfuls and drinking in long gulps. Because of his enormous appetite, several men were required to serve him whenever he sat down for meals. Cao Cao was very impressed with him.

Dian Wei's weapons of choice were a pair of jis or long swords. There was a saying in Cao Cao's army about Dian Wei: "In our camp resides the warrior Dian Wei, who wields a pair of jis weighing 80 jin in total."

=== Death at the Battle of Wancheng ===
Dian Wei wielding his dual jis as depicted in the Peking opera Battle of Wan

In February 197, Cao Cao invaded Wancheng (宛城; present-day Wancheng District, Nanyang, Henan) in the north of Jing Province. Wancheng was the territory of the warlord Zhang Xiu, who immediately surrendered upon learning of Cao Cao's invasion. Cao Cao was pleased so he threw a party for Zhang Xiu and his men. During the party, Dian Wei stood guard behind Cao Cao, holding a giant battle axe whose blade was one chi long. Zhang Xiu and his followers did not dare to look up when they toasted to Cao Cao.

Cao Cao had stayed in Wancheng for more than 10 days when Zhang Xiu suddenly rebelled and launched a surprise attack on his camp. Cao Cao was caught unprepared so he retreated with a few horsemen.

Dian Wei stood guard at the entrance to the camp and prevented Zhang Xiu's soldiers from advancing further. The enemy then scattered and broke into Cao Cao's camp from the other entrances. Dian Wei had about a dozen men with him and they were all heavily outnumbered by Zhang Xiu's forces. However, Dian Wei fought bravely with a long ji, and with each swing of his weapon, he broke more than ten enemy spears. As the battle went on, Dian Wei's men were eventually all killed and Dian himself had sustained several wounds all over his body, but he continued fighting the enemy at close quarters with short weapons. Dian Wei grabbed two enemies and killed them, and the others did not dare to approach him. Dian Wei then rushed forward and slew several more enemy soldiers before eventually succumbing to his wounds. Just before his death, he was still glaring and swearing at the enemy. Only after confirming that Dian Wei was dead did the enemies dare to come forward and decapitate him. Dian Wei's head was passed around for Zhang Xiu's men to see. They also came to look at his headless body.

By then, Cao Cao had already retreated safely to Wuyin County (舞陰縣; southeast of present-day Sheqi County, Henan), and he broke down in tears when he heard of Dian Wei's death. He ordered his men to retrieve Dian Wei's body and personally attended the funeral and had Dian Wei buried in Xiangyi County (襄邑縣; present-day Sui County, Henan). Later, whenever Cao Cao passed by Dian Wei's grave, he would stop to pay his respects and mourn Dian Wei.

== Family ==
Cao Cao appointed Dian Wei's son, Dian Man (典滿), as a langzhong (郎中). Cao Cao missed Dian Wei later so he promoted Dian Man to Major (司馬) and kept Dian Man close to him. After Cao Cao died in March 220, his son Cao Pi appointed Dian Man as a Commandant (都尉) and granted him the title of a Secondary Marquis (關內侯).

== In Romance of the Three Kingdoms ==
Dian Wei appears as a character in the 14th-century historical novel Romance of the Three Kingdoms, which romanticises the historical events before and during the Three Kingdoms period.

Dian Wei first appeared in Chapter 10, and he was first introduced by Xiahou Dun to Cao Cao sometime in 193. According to Xiahou Dun, Dian Wei used to serve Zhang Miao but he could not get along well with Zhang's men, and he once killed tens of men before fleeing into the hills. While Xiahou Dun was out hunting, he saw Dian Wei chasing a deer across a stream and he brought the man back to his lord. Xiahou Dun continued to tell Cao Cao about Dian Wei's background and physical prowess. Cao Cao then asked Dian Wei to demonstrate his skills. At that time, a huge banner was swaying in the wind and was on the verge of collapsing. Many of Cao Cao's men were unable to keep the banner upright even with their combined efforts. Dian Wei shouted at them to move back and he grabbed the banner pole with one hand and kept it steady. Cao Cao exclaimed, "This is Elai (Note: Elai was a bodyguard of King Zhou of the Shang dynasty who was known for his immense physical strength.) of ancient times!" Dian Wei then became a Commandant under Cao Cao.

Dian Wei's death at the Battle of Wancheng is described in greater detail in Chapter 16 but is more exaggerated than his historical biography. In this exaggeration, it was mentioned that Dian Wei was able to pick up the dead bodies of enemies by their feet and swing them as a means of attack before he was finally killed by raining arrows and piercing spears. At Dian Wei's funeral, Cao Cao wept and told his followers, "I don't feel very sad over the loss of my eldest son (Cao Ang) and my favourite nephew (Cao Anmin). I'm only mourning Dian Wei!"

== In popular culture ==
Dian Wei appears as a character in Koei's Dynasty Warriors, Warriors Orochi, and Romance of the Three Kingdoms video game series. He also appears in Chan Mou's manhua series The Ravages of Time, a retelling of the historical novel Romance of the Three Kingdoms.

Dian Wei appears alongside Xu Chu as a guardian spirit of General Cao Yanbing in the anime and drama series Rakshasa Street.

In Wo Long Fallen Dynasty, Dian Wei appeared as an ally in the Battle of Zhongyuan, later while being cornered by Zhang Xiu's forces, in a last ditch effort to protect Cao Cao, Dian Wei resort to consuming the legendary Taoist elixir Danyao to power up, the influx of Yin Qi, demonized Dian Wei, merging him with the mythical spirit Feilian, becoming a humanoid Feilian Yaoguai.

== See also ==
- Lists of people of the Three Kingdoms
