= Xu Chu =

Chinese state of Wei general (died c.230)

- 許褚
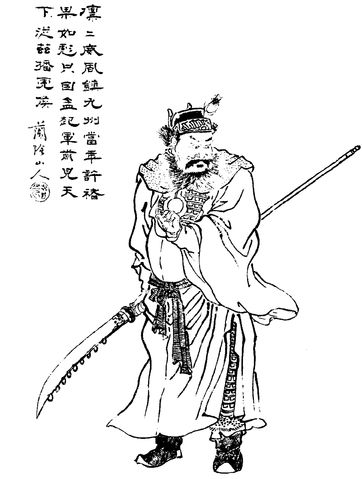
- A Qing dynasty illustration of Xu Chu

General of the Military Guards (武衞將軍)
- In office 220 – ?
- Monarch: Cao Pi

Central Resolute General (中堅將軍)
- In office c. 216 – 220
- Monarch: Emperor Xian of Han
- Chancellor: Cao Cao

Personal details
- Born: Unknown Bozhou, Anhui
- Died: c. 230 (Note: Xu Chu's death date was not clearly recorded in his biography in the Sanguozhi. However, his biography suggests that he died after Cao Rui became emperor in June 226. Rafe de Crespigny estimates that he died around 230.)
- Relations: Xu Ding (brother)
- Children: Xu Yi
- Occupation: Military general
- Courtesy name: Zhongkang (仲康)
- Posthumous name: Marquis Zhuang (壯侯)
- Peerage: Marquis of Mou District (牟鄉侯)
- Nickname: "Tiger Fool" (虎癡)

Xu Chu (died c. 230), courtesy name Zhongkang, was a Chinese military general who lived during the late Eastern Han dynasty and the Three Kingdoms period of China. He started his career as a bodyguard to the warlord Cao Cao and later became a general in the state of Wei during the Three Kingdoms period. He was described to be a big and strong man, yet simple minded and honest, so he was nicknamed "Tiger Fool" by his men. After his death, he was posthumously honoured with the title "Marquis Zhuang", which literally means "robust marquis".

== Early life ==
Xu Chu was from Qiao County (譙縣), Pei State (沛國), which is present-day Bozhou, Anhui. He was over eight chi tall (≈1.86 metres) with a broad waist. He had an imposing and sturdy look and was known for his great strength and courage.

Towards the end of the Eastern Han dynasty, Xu Chu rallied thousands of his clan members and they constructed a fortress to fend off the Yellow Turban rebels. An army of rebels from Runan (汝南; present-day Runan County, Henan), numbering more than 10,000, once attacked Xu Chu's fortress. The defenders were outnumbered and worn out as the battle dragged on. When the arrows were used up, Xu Chu told all the men and women within the fortress to gather stones the size of chess pieces and place them in the four corners of the fortress. He then hurled the stones at the enemies, crushing the bones of all those who were hit. The rebels then kept a distance away and did not dare to come close. When the food supply was exhausted, Xu Chu pretended to negotiate a truce with the rebels and discuss a deal to exchange an ox for food. When the rebels came to collect the ox, the animal would always run back. Xu Chu, holding on to the ox's tail, pulled it along for more than a hundred steps. Seeing this, the startled rebels took off without the ox. The rebels in the surrounding areas heard of this incident and became fearful of Xu Chu.

== Service under Cao Cao ==
In 197, when Cao Cao came to the Runan and Huainan area, Xu Chu led his militia to join the warlord. Upon seeing Xu Chu's strength, Cao Cao exclaimed: "This man is my Fan Kuai!" Xu Chu was appointed as a Commandant (都尉) among Cao Cao's close guards, who were known as the "Tiger Warriors" (虎士). During Cao Cao's campaign against a rival warlord Zhang Xiu, Xu Chu fought on the frontline and slew many enemies. He was promoted to Colonel (校尉) for his achievement.

In 200, Xu Chu followed Cao Cao to the Battle of Guandu against the northern warlord Yuan Shao. During the battle, Xu Ta (徐他) and some conspirators plotted to assassinate Cao Cao. They feared Xu Chu so they waited until he went to rest before they entered Cao Cao's tent with swords hidden under their clothes. Xu Chu felt uneasy earlier on, so he had returned to Cao Cao's tent to protect his lord. When Xu Ta and the others showed up in Cao Cao's tent, they were very surprised to see Xu Chu there and could not contain their astonishment. Xu Chu sensed their intentions and killed them. After this incident, Cao Cao trusted Xu Chu even more and would go nowhere without Xu Chu by his side. Xu Chu participated in the Battle of Ye in 204 and received the title of a Secondary Marquis (關內侯) as a reward for his efforts.

=== Battle of Tong Pass ===
In 211, during the Battle of Tong Pass against a coalition of northwestern warlords led by Ma Chao and Han Sui, Cao Cao led his troops north across the Wei River in an attempt to circle to the rear of the enemy. The bulk of Cao Cao's troops had already crossed the river, leaving Cao Cao and his "Tiger Warriors" to bring up the rear. Just then, Ma Chao and his 10,000 horsemen caught up with them. As the enemies were approaching fast, Cao Cao's soldiers rushed to get on board the ferry, which was on the verge of sinking under the weight. Xu Chu held up a saddle with his left hand to shield Cao Cao from arrows and carried a sword in his right hand, using it to slash enemy soldiers trying to clamber onto the vessel. By then, the boatman had been killed by arrows, so Xu Chu, still holding up the saddle with his left hand, used his other hand to grab a bargepole and push the ferry away from the ford to safety.

Cao Cao later agreed to meet Ma Chao and Han Sui for talks, and he brought along only Xu Chu. Ma Chao had confidence in himself and he secretly planned to use the opportunity to charge forward and capture Cao Cao, but he had heard of Xu Chu's might before and he suspected that the man beside Cao Cao was Xu Chu. Ma Chao asked Cao Cao: "Where's your Tiger Marquis?" Cao Cao pointed at Xu Chu, who glared at Ma Chao. Ma Chao was afraid and did not dare to make his move. (Note: Sima Guang was skeptical that this anecdote happened as Ma Chao wasn't with Han Sui when the latter met Cao Cao. Sima evidently assumed that Han and Cao only met once during the battle; it is possible that there was another meeting which was unrecorded.) Both sides then returned to their respective camps. Several days later, a battle was fought, and Cao Cao scored a major victory. Xu Chu killed several enemies and was promoted to Military Guard General of the Household (武衞中郎將) for his achievement. This was the first time the term "Military Guard" (武衞) was used. Cao Cao's soldiers knew that Xu Chu possessed the might of a tiger, but he was also simple minded, so they nicknamed him "Tiger Fool" (虎癡).

=== Incident with Cao Ren ===
Xu Chu was known to be a cautious and serious person who did not talk much and was very mindful of rules and regulations. Once, Cao Cao's cousin Cao Ren came from Jing Province to meet Cao Cao, who had recently been enfeoffed as a vassal king. Cao Cao was still in his personal chambers, with Xu Chu standing guard outside, when Cao Ren arrived. Cao Ren asked Xu Chu to join him in the side room for a chat. However, Xu Chu told Cao Ren that Cao Cao was coming out soon, and then turned his back on Cao Ren and entered Cao Cao's chambers. Cao Ren was very unhappy with Xu Chu for treating him coldly. Later, someone told Xu Chu: "The General (Cao Ren) is a close relative and important subject of the King. He lowered himself when he asked to chat with you. How could you reject him?" Xu Chu replied: "He may be a close relative and important subject of the King, but he's in charge of external defences at the borders. I, Xu Chu, am in charge of internal security. If he wanted to chat with me, we could do so in public. Why did he ask to chat with me in private?" Cao Cao was impressed and he favoured Xu Chu even more after he heard about the incident, so he promoted him to Central Resolute General (中堅將軍).

== Service under Cao Pi ==
When Cao Cao died in March 220, Xu Chu was so overwhelmed with sorrow that he vomited blood. Later that year, Cao Cao's son Cao Pi ended the Eastern Han dynasty and established the state of Wei, marking the start of the Three Kingdoms period. Cao Pi became emperor and he also favoured Xu Chu greatly. He promoted Xu Chu to General of the Military Guards (武衞將軍), put him in charge of the palace guards and enfeoffed him as the Marquis of Wansui Village (萬歲亭侯). The original "Tiger Warriors" under Xu Chu's command were all commissioned as officers, but only slightly more than 10 of them rose through the ranks to become generals and marquises, while only about a hundred were promoted to commandants and colonels.

Cao Pi died in June 226 and was succeeded by his son Cao Rui. Cao Rui enfeoffed Xu Chu as the Marquis of Mou District (牟鄉侯) and granted him a marquisate comprising 700 taxable households. He also awarded the peerage of a Secondary Marquis (關內侯) to one of Xu Chu's sons. After his death, Xu Chu was given the posthumous name "Marquis Zhuang" (壯侯), which literally means "robust marquis".

== Family and descendants ==
Sometime during the Taihe era (227-233) of Cao Rui's reign, the emperor issued an imperial edict praising Xu Chu and conferring the peerage of a Secondary Marquis (關內侯) on one of Xu Chu's sons and one of his grandsons.

Xu Chu's son, Xu Yi (許儀), inherited his father's peerage. In 263, when the Wei state launched a major campaign to conquer its rival state Shu, Xu Yi served as an officer under the Wei general Zhong Hui, who tasked him with overseeing the construction of a road leading into Shu. However, when the road turned out to be poorly built, Zhong Hui disregarded Xu Yi's background and had him executed for failing his mission. The Wei army was shocked at Zhong Hui's audacity. Xu Yi's son, Xu Zong (許綜), inherited his father's peerage at the beginning of the Taishi era (February 266 to 274) of the reign of Emperor Wu, founding emperor of the Jin dynasty.

Xu Chu's elder brother, Xu Ding (許定), also served in the Wei military and was promoted to General Who Inspires Might (振威將軍) and commanded the huben division of the imperial guards.

== Appraisal ==
Chen Shou, who wrote Xu Chu's biography in the Sanguozhi, commented that Xu Chu and Dian Wei were powerful bodyguards and were comparable to Fan Kuai, a general who served under Liu Bang, the founding emperor of the Han dynasty.

== In Romance of the Three Kingdoms ==
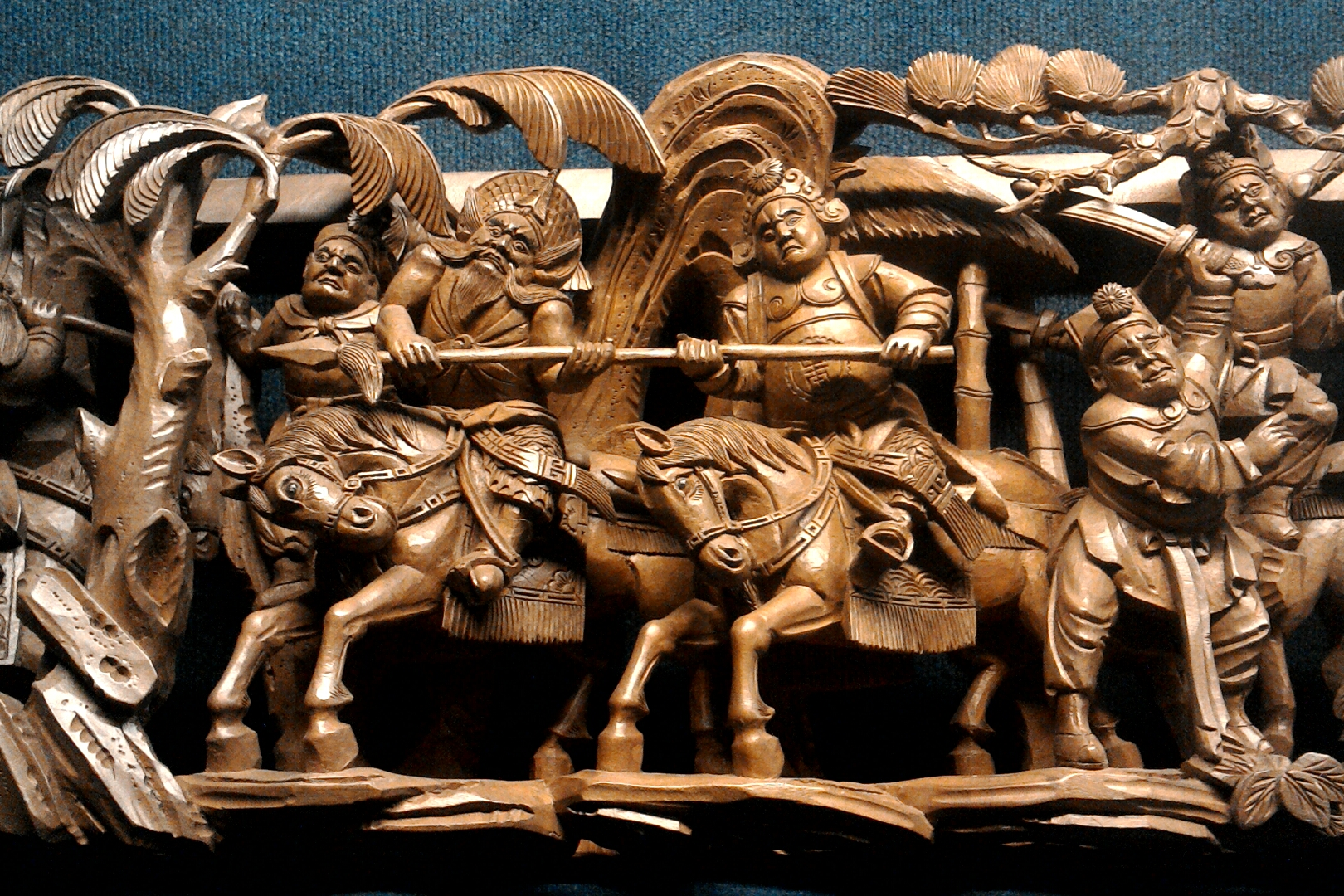
Wooden sculpture of duel between Xu Chu (right) against Ma Chao (left) in fictionalized Three Kingdoms novel

Xu Chu appears as a character in the 14th-century historical novel Romance of the Three Kingdoms, which romanticises the historical events before and during the Three Kingdoms period. His bravery and strength are emphasised by a fictitious story in Chapter 59, when he duels with Ma Chao during the Battle of Tong Pass. (Note: See Battle of Tong Pass (211)#In Romance of the Three Kingdoms for more information.)

== In popular culture ==
Xu Chu is featured as a playable character in Koei's Dynasty Warriors and Warriors Orochi video game series. His name is erroneously romanised as "Xu Zhu" in the games.

Xu Chu is featured as a guardian spirit alongside Dian Wei of General Cao Yanbing in the anime "Rakshasa Street".

== See also ==
- Lists of people of the Three Kingdoms
