= Mao Jie =

Chinese official serving Cao Cao (died 216)

- 毛玠

Supervisor of the Masters of Writing (尚書僕射)
- In office 213 – 216
- Monarch: Emperor Xian of Han
- Chancellor: Cao Cao

Personal details
- Born: Unknown Fengqiu County, Henan
- Died: 216
- Children: Mao Ji
- Occupation: Official
- Courtesy name: Xiaoxian (孝先)

Mao Jie (died 216 (Note: Mao Jie's biography in Sanguozhi did not explicitly indicate when he died, only that he died at home after he was dismissed from service. Vol.67 of Zizhi Tongjian dated his death at home to 216.)), courtesy name Xiaoxian, was an official serving under the warlord Cao Cao during the late Eastern Han dynasty of China. He was from Pingqiu County, Chenliu Commandery, which is located east of present-day Fengqiu County, Henan. On the recommendation of Man Chong, Mao Jie joined Cao Cao. Mao Jie was very skilled when it came to domestic policies promoting the prioritisation of agriculture.

== Dismissal and death ==
After Cui Yan's death in 216, Mao Jie was very displeased. He then met an ex-rebel who had been sentenced to qing (黥; a form of punishment which involved branding a criminal by tattooing his face), and whose wife and children had been enslaved by the government. Mao supposedly said to the man, "Maybe, this is why it had not been raining." (implying that the man had been treated unjustly). Someone reported this to Cao Cao; (Note: A Wei Shu annotation in He Kui's biography in Sanguozhi recorded that Fu Xun informed He Kui that Mao Jie was framed by Ding Yi.) greatly angered, Cao imprisoned him. After Huan Jie and He Qia interceded on Mao's behalf, Mao was dismissed from service; he later died at home. (Note: In his annotation, Sun Sheng criticized Cao Cao for Mao Jie's dismissal, comparing Cao unfavorably to Liu Bang. Sun noted that while Liu Bang did imprison Xiao He, Xiao He later regained his chancellorship after he was released, whereas Mao Jie was never given another post after his dismissal.)

== See also ==
- Lists of people of the Three Kingdoms
