= Xiahou Mao =

3rd century Cao Wei state general

- 夏侯楙

General Who Guards the East (鎮東將軍)
- In office ?–?
- Monarch: Cao Rui

Master of Writing (尚書)
- In office 228 – ?
- Monarch: Cao Pi / Cao Rui

General Who Stabilises the West (安西將軍)
- In office 220 – 228
- Monarch: Cao Pi / Cao Rui

Personal details
- Born: Unknown
- Died: Unknown
- Spouse: Princess Qinghe
- Parent: Xiahou Dun (father)
- Relatives: Xiahou Chong (elder brother); Xiahou Zizang (younger brother); Xiahou Zijiang (younger brother); at least three other brothers
- Occupation: General
- Courtesy name: Zilin (子林)
- Peerage: Marquis

Xiahou Mao (fl. 190s – 230s), courtesy name Zilin, was a military general and marquis of the state of Cao Wei during the Three Kingdoms period of China. He was the second son of Xiahou Dun, a general who served under the warlord Cao Cao, while Xiahou Mao was a close friend of the founding Emperor Cao Pi. Xiahou Mao married Princess Qinghe, one of Cao Cao's daughters, though the marriage would be an unhappy one and he once faced accusation of treason from his own family.

== Life ==
From the Xiahou clan, which had long been allies to the Cao clan and supporters in the civil war, Xiahou Mao was a close friend of Cao Pi in Pi's youth. Xiahou Mao was appointed by Cao Cao to the secretariat and enoffed; he also married Cao Cao's eldest daughter. When Cao Pi brought about the abdication of Emperor Xian (the last emperor of the Han dynasty) in 220 and became the first emperor of Cao Wei, Xiahou Mao helped sponsor a commentary stele, perhaps as a proxy for his late father Xiahou Dun. Cao Pi made his sister Princess of Qinghe (in Gangling) and appointed Xiahou Mao as General Who Stabilises the West (安西將軍), putting him in charge of military affairs in the Guanzhong region, with his headquarters at Chang'an (present-day Xi'an, Shaanxi) left vacant by the death of kinsman Xiahou Yuan. According to the Weilue, Xiahou Mao was known for having no talent in military matters with an interest in personal business affairs, Howard Goodman suggests Xiahou Mao may have spent his time gallivanting around the area rather than his duties. While away from the capital, he enjoyed collecting dancers and concubines with his wife unhappy with his adultery.

When Shu Han Chancellor Zhuge Liang prepared to attack Cao Wei for the first time, Wei Yan advocated sending an army across harsh terrain to launch a sneak attack on Chang'an in the belief that Xiahou Mao was young, timid and irresolute so would panic on hearing of his arrival and flee Chang'an, leaving the city easy for Wei Yan to take. However Zhuge Liang rejected Wei Yan's plan and in the spring of early 228, launched the first of his Northern Campaigns. The second Wei emperor, Cao Rui, personally led reinforcements to Chang'an and hearing of complaints about Xiahou Mao's performance, he removed Xiahou Mao from his command, assigning it to the rather more suited Cao Zhen and reassigned Xiahou Mao to be a Master of Writing (尚書) in the Wei central government in Luoyang.

Around 230, tensions between Xiahou Mao and his wife got worse. Xiahou Mao's two younger brothers, Xiahou Zizang (夏侯子臧) and Xiahou Zijiang (夏侯子江) had earned Xiahou Mao's ire over failing to respect the courtesies and they feared punishment, so they allied with their sister-in-law, writing a memorial on her behalf accusing Xiahou Mao of treason. Xiahou Mao was arrested, with Cao Rui going to execute him. But, Duan Mo (段默) argued that Xiahou Mao's bad relations with his wife meant this was slander and that Xiahou Mao had served Cao Pi well. Cao Rui ordered an investigation as to who wrote the memorial and when truth came out, he released Xiahou Mao and restored him as a Master of Writing.

Some time later in Cao Rui's reign, Xiahou Mao was appointed as General Who Guards the East (鎮東將軍). It is not known when he died.

== In Romance of the Three Kingdoms ==
In the 14th-century historical novel Romance of the Three Kingdoms, Xiahou Mao's courtesy name is Zixiu (子休).

Xiahou Mao's supposed impotence was dramatised in the novel. When he was assigned to defend the Wei-Shu border, he was not well respected by his colleagues, who assumed that Xiahou Mao would be unable to fulfil his role. Xiahou Mao reportedly responded to such criticism as follows:

Ever since I was a boy, I have studied strategy, and I am well acquainted with army matters. Why do you despise my youth? Unless I capture this Zhuge Liang, I pledge myself never again to see the Emperor's face."

His early encounter against Shu turned out badly, and he was forced to flee. After consulting with his generals, he planned a successful ambush against the Shu general Zhao Yun and duelled him for over 50 rounds. Unfortunately for Xiahou Mao, this victory was only temporary, as Shu generals Zhang Bao and Guan Xing both arrived with 10,000 troops to save Zhao Yun; Xiahou Mao's army was utterly routed by nightfall. Xiahou Mao escaped to Nan'an Commandery with just 100 horsemen. He managed to resist a siege for ten days until Zhuge Liang arrived and directed his efforts towards Tianshui Commandery. Cui Liang, a defeated Wei officer who was en route to Tianshui, offered Zhuge Liang to convince the governor of Nan'an, Yang Ling, to turn the city over. In fact, he had no such intention, instead telling Yang Ling what had taken place, and the two of them and Xiahou Mao attempted to lure the Shu army into the city and destroy them.

Zhuge Liang saw through the plot and turned it against them. Both Cui Liang and Yang Ling were slain by Zhang Bao and Guan Xing respectively, and Xiahou Mao was captured. He begged for his life and was released by Zhuge Liang on the condition that he convinces Jiang Wei to defect to Shu. In fact, Xiahou Mao was simply being played a fool, and was tricked into thinking that Jiang Wei had already defected. He went to Tianshui Commandery to meet Ma Zun (馬遵), the commandery's Administrator, and his false belief of Jiang Wei's defection was reinforced when a fake Jiang Wei led troops to attack Tianshui. He was driven off, and so was the real Jiang Wei when he came to Tianshui later. Due to the later defection of Jiang Wei and the betrayal of Liang Xu (梁緒) and Yin Shang (尹賞) (friends of Jiang Wei), Tianshui fell to Shu forces. Xiahou Mao fled with a few hundred loyalists and sought refuge with the Qiang tribes, and, staying true to his words, never returned.

== See also ==
- Lists of people of the Three Kingdoms
