= Zhang Xiu (warlord) =

Chinese general and warlord (died 207)

- 張繡
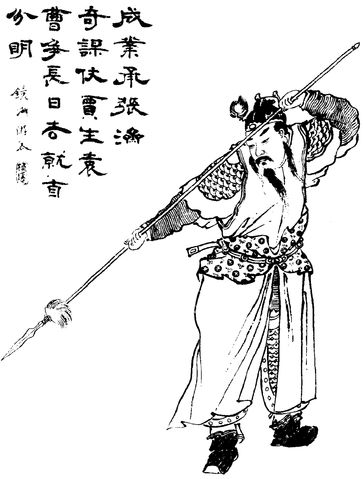
- A Qing dynasty illustration of Zhang Xiu

General Who Defeats the Qiang (破羌將軍) (under Cao Cao)
- In office 200 – 207
- Monarch: Emperor Xian of Han

General Who Spreads Martial Might (揚武將軍)
- In office 199 – 200
- Monarch: Emperor Xian of Han

General who Builds Loyalty (建忠將軍)
- In office 192 – 199
- Monarch: Emperor Xian of Han

Personal details
- Born: Unknown Jingyuan County, Gansu
- Died: 207 Chaoyang, Liaoning
- Children: Zhang Quan; Cao Jun's wife
- Relatives: Zhang Ji (uncle)
- Occupation: General, warlord
- Posthumous name: Marquis Ding (定侯)
- Peerage: Marquis of Xuanwei (宣威侯)

Zhang Xiu (died 207) was a military general and minor warlord who lived during the late Eastern Han dynasty of China. In 197, he clashed with the warlord Cao Cao, who was then the de facto head of the Han central government, at the Battle of Wancheng and subsequent skirmishes. However, in 200, he heeded the suggestion from his adviser Jia Xu and surrendered to Cao Cao, who accepted his surrender and appointed him as a general. Having fought on Cao Cao's side at the decisive Battle of Guandu against a rival warlord Yuan Shao and in the subsequent campaigns against Yuan Shao's heirs, Zhang Xiu made great contributions during his service under Cao Cao. In 207, he died en route to joining Cao Cao on a campaign against the Wuhuan tribes. The Han imperial court honoured with the posthumous title "Marquis Ding".

== Life ==
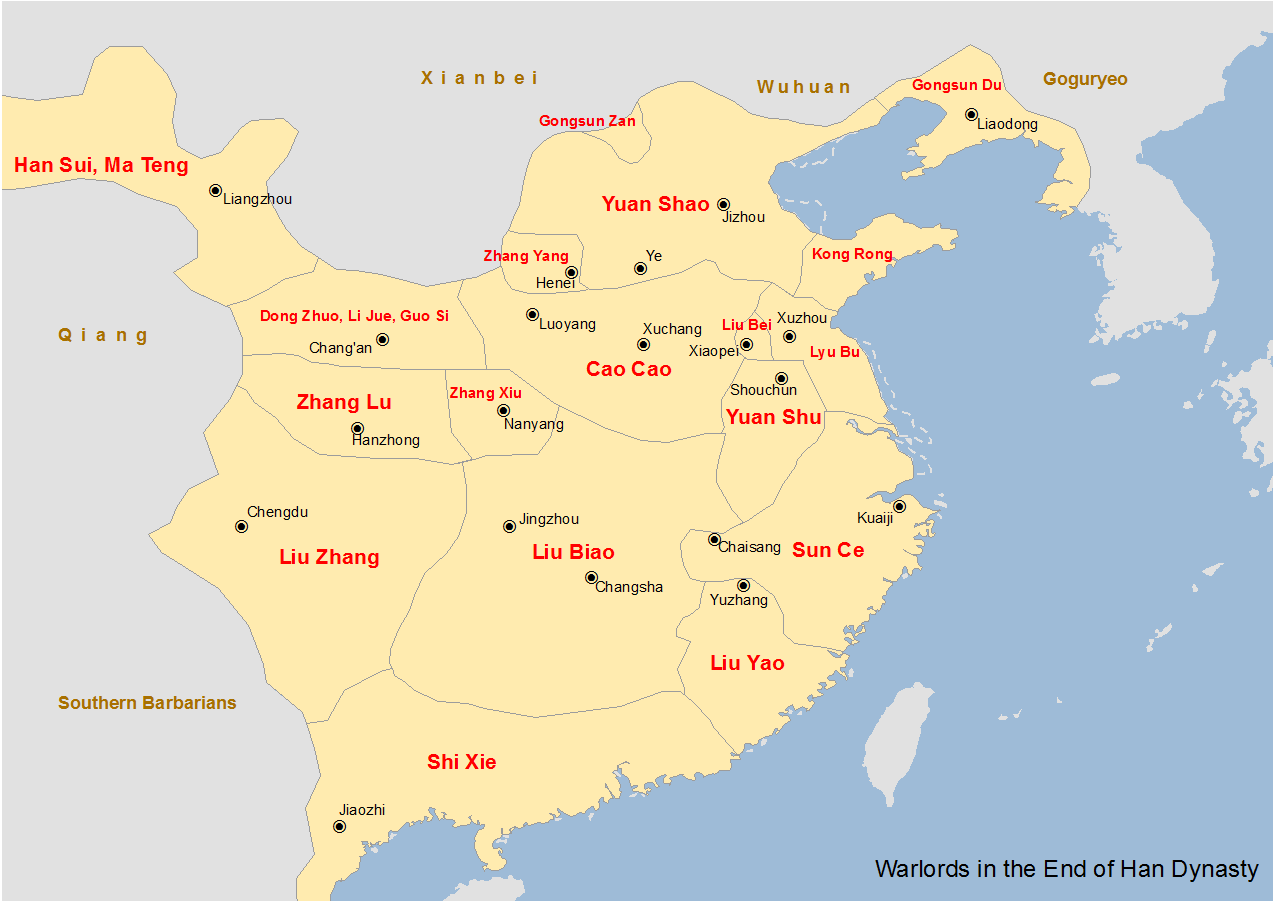
Map showing the major warlords of the Han dynasty in the 190s, including Zhang Xiu

Zhang Xiu was from Zuli County (祖厲縣), Wuwei Commandery (武威郡), which is in present-day Jingyuan County, Gansu. He was a distant nephew of Zhang Ji, who served under the tyrannical warlord Dong Zhuo.

During the Liang Province rebellion, Zhang Xiu was still a minor county official at Zuli. A rebel from Jincheng by the name of Qu Sheng (麴勝) had killed the Chief (長) of Zuli by the name of Liu Jun (劉雋); Zhang Xiu managed to kill Qu Sheng in return. This act won him the praise of many people in Zuli.

After Dong Zhuo's death in May 192, his former subjects, including Zhang Ji, waged a coup and took over the imperial capital Chang'an. For his part in the coup, Zhang Xiu was also promoted to General who Builds Loyalty (建忠將軍) and enfeoffed as the Marquis of Xuanwei (宣威侯).

After Zhang Ji's death, Zhang Xiu took over command of his troops and occupied Wan (宛; or Wancheng (宛城); in present-day Nanyang, Henan). He allied himself with Liu Biao, the Governor of Jing Province and a major warlord of the time. In 197, the warlord Cao Cao, who controlled the Han central government, led his forces on campaigns against rival warlords. When he arrived at the banks of the Bai River (白河), Zhang Xiu promptly surrendered to him and was allowed to retain control over Wan.

Cao Cao then took Zhang Ji's widow as a concubine, which angered Zhang Xiu. Cao Cao heard of Zhang Xiu's displeasure and plotted to kill him. However, the plan was leaked and Zhang Xiu waged a surprise attack against Cao Cao, leading to the Battle of Wancheng. Cao Cao's personal bodyguard Dian Wei died defending the front gate to the camp so that Cao Cao could escape through the back gate. In the hasty retreat, Cao Cao's eldest son, Cao Ang, offered his own horse to his father, whose steed was felled by enemy arrows, and was killed by the pursuers. Cao Cao's nephew Cao Anmin was also killed.

Henceafter, Cao Cao had sent forces to attack Zhang Xiu for years without success. In 200, however, Zhang Xiu heeded the suggestion from his adviser, Jia Xu, and surrendered to Cao Cao again. Cao Cao decided to put aside his past feud with Zhang Xiu and accept his surrender. He also proposed a marriage between his son Cao Jun and Zhang Xiu's daughter.

Around the time, Cao Cao was at war with the northern warlord Yuan Shao at the Battle of Guandu. Having performed well during the conflict, Zhang Xiu was soon promoted to General who Defeats the Qiang (破羌將軍). In 207, Zhang Xiu died at Liucheng (present-day Chaoyang, Liaoning) en route to join Cao Cao in a northern campaign against the Wuhuan tribes. The Han imperial court honoured him with the posthumous title "Marquis Ding" (定侯), literally meaning "steadfast marquis".

== See also ==
- War between Cao Cao and Zhang Xiu
- Lists of people of the Three Kingdoms
