= Cao Ang =

Chinese warlord Cao Cao's eldest son (c.177–197)

Cao Ang 曹昂
- Born: c. 177
- Died: between 5 February and 6 March (Note: The Zizhi Tongjian recorded that the Battle of Wancheng took place in the 1st month of the 2nd year of the Jian'an era of the reign of Emperor Xian of the Eastern Han dynasty. This month corresponds to 5 February to 6 March 197 in the Gregorian calendar.) 197 (aged 20); Wancheng District, Nanyang, Henan
Names
- Family name: Cao (曹); Given name: Ang (昂); Courtesy name: Zixiu (子脩)
Posthumous name
- Prince Min (愍王)
- House: House of Cao
- Father: Cao Cao
- Mother: Consort Liu

Cao Ang (c. 177 – February or March 197), courtesy name Zixiu, was the eldest son of Cao Cao, a warlord who rose to power towards the end of the Han dynasty and laid the foundation of the state of Cao Wei in the Three Kingdoms period of China. He was killed at the Battle of Wancheng in 197.

== Life ==
Cao Ang was the first son of Cao Cao and his concubine Lady Liu (劉夫人). Lady Liu also bore Cao Cao another son, Cao Shuo (曹鑠), and a daughter, Grand Princess Qinghe (清河長公主). However, as Lady Liu died early, Cao Ang was raised by Cao Cao's first official spouse, Lady Ding (丁夫人), who treated Cao Ang as though he was her own son.

Nothing was recorded in history about Cao Ang's early life, except that he was nominated as a xiaolian (civil service candidate) when he reached the age of adulthood (around 19 years old). In February or March 197, Cao Ang followed his father on a campaign against the warlord Zhang Xiu in Wan (宛; or Wancheng, in present-day Wancheng District, Nanyang, Henan). Zhang Xiu surrendered initially, but rebelled later, launched a surprise attack on Cao Cao and caught him completely off guard. Cao Cao was injured in the right arm by a stray arrow during the battle while his horse, Jueying (絕影), was hit in the neck and leg. Cao Ang could not ride on horseback so he offered his own steed to his father, who managed to escape from Wancheng. Cao Ang later died in battle.

== Subsequent events and succession ==
Lady Ding wept often on Cao Ang's death and accused Cao Cao of getting Cao Ang killed. Cao Cao became angry and sent her back to her family in the hope she might change her mind. When Cao Cao went to see her around 200, she refused to speak to him, and they officially divorced. After Lady Ding's death, Cao Cao often wondered how he could face his son's spirit if he asked about Lady Ding.

In 221, after Cao Pi (Cao Ang's younger half-brother) ended the Han dynasty and established the state of Cao Wei (which marked the start of the Three Kingdoms period), he granted Cao Ang the posthumous title "Duke Dao of Feng" (豐悼公). Three years later, Cao Ang was posthumously elevated to the status of a prince, so his posthumous title became "Prince Dao of Feng" (豐悼王), literally Mourned Prince of Feng. In 229, during the reign of Cao Pi's son Cao Rui, Cao Ang's posthumous title was changed to "Prince Min of Feng" (豐愍王), literally Pitied Prince of Feng.

Cao Ang had no son to succeed him when he died. However, in 222, Cao Wan (曹琬), a son of Cao Ang's half-brother, Cao Jun (曹均), was designated as Cao Ang's heir and was enfeoffed as a Zhongdu Duke (中都公). Later that year, Cao Wan was reassigned as a Zhangzi Duke (長子公). In 254, during the reign of Cao Fang, Cao Wan was promoted to "Prince of Feng" (豐王) and given the princedom "Feng", per Cao Ang's posthumous title. The number of taxable households in his princedom increased through the reigns of Cao Mao and Cao Huan until it reached 2,700. After Cao Wan died, he was posthumously honoured as "Prince Gong of Feng" (豐恭王) and was succeeded by his son, Cao Lian (曹廉).

A tomb discovered at the Cao Cao Mausoleum in Anyang which contained clothes but no human remains may belong to Cao Ang, as his body was never found.

== See also ==
- Cao Wei family trees § Lady Liu
- Lists of people of the Three Kingdoms
