= 190s =

Decade

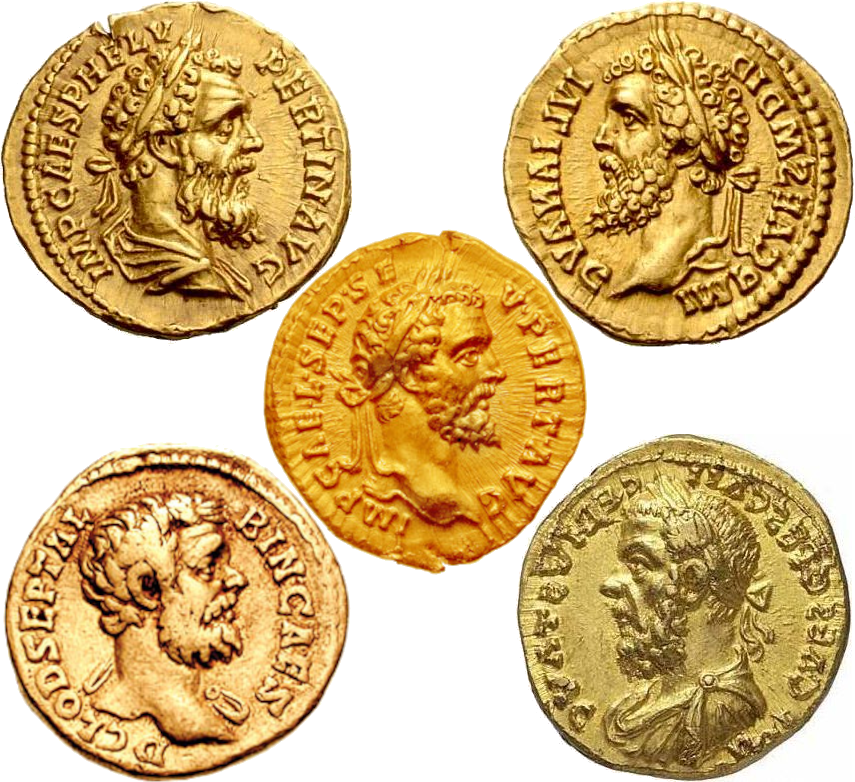
The Roman Empire had five emperors in 193. Clockwise from top left: Pertinax, Didius Julianus, Pescennius Niger and Clodius Albinus, with Septimius Severus in the center.

The 190s decade ran from January 1, 190, to December 31, 199.

== Events ==
=== 190 ===
==== By place ====
====== Roman Empire ======
- A part of Rome burns; Emperor Commodus orders the city to be rebuilt, under the name Colonia Commodiana.
- At the climax of his power, the freedman Marcus Aurelius Cleander appoints 25 men as Roman consuls. Amongst these is Lucius Septimius Severus, who later becomes emperor during the Year of the Five Emperors).
- A Roman road crosses the Alps, by the Simplon Pass.

====== China ======
- First year of the Chuping era of the Chinese Han Dynasty.
- The Campaign against Dong Zhuo begins. During the Battle of Xingyang, Cao Cao's army is defeated by Dong Zhuo.
- Luoyang is burned and plundered by the forces of Dong Zhuo. The court is moved to Chang'an.

====== Parthia ======
- Osroes II, controlling Media, claims the throne of the Parthian Empire. King Vologases IV of Parthia puts down the rebellion and restores order.

==== By topic ====
====== Art and Science ======
- Cleomedes teaches that the moon does not glow on its own, but rather reflects sunlight.

====== Economic ======
- Egypt (under Roman rule) is impoverished due to an inflation rate of 100% during the previous decade.
- The percentage of silver in the Egyptian denarius is lowered from 90% to 70%.

=== 191 ===
==== By place ====
====== Parthia ======
- King Vologases IV of Parthia dies after a 44-year reign, and is succeeded by his son Vologases V.

====== China ======
- A coalition of Chinese warlords from the east of Hangu Pass launches a punitive campaign against the warlord Dong Zhuo, who seized control of the central government in 189, and held the figurehead Emperor Xian hostage. After suffering some defeats against the coalition forces, Dong Zhuo forcefully relocates the imperial capital from Luoyang to Chang'an. Before leaving, Dong Zhuo orders his troops to loot the tombs of the Han emperors, and then destroy Luoyang by fire, to leave behind nothing for the coalition.
- Battle of Jieqiao: Yuan Shao narrowly defeats Gongsun Zan, in northern China.

==== By topic ====
====== Art ======
- c. 191–192 – The sculpture of Commodus as Hercules, from Esquiline Hill, Rome, is made (it is now kept at Palazzo dei Conservatori, Rome).

====== Religion ======
- Serapion becomes Patriarch of Antioch.

=== 192 ===
==== By place ====
====== Roman Empire ======
- December 31 – Emperor Commodus alarms the Senate, by appearing dressed as a gladiator for his new consulship on January 1. His mistress Marcia finds her name on the imperial execution list, and hires champion wrestler Narcissus to assassinate Commodus; the Antonines Dynasty ends.
- Civil war again strikes Ancient Rome (192–193).

====== China ======
- May 22 – Lü Bu assassinates warlord Dong Zhuo, who has controlled the central government of the Han Dynasty (since 189).

====== Vietnam ======
- The kingdom of Champa begins to control south and central Vietnam (approximate date).

==== By topic ====
====== Arts and Science ======
- A fire destroys Galen's library.

====== Religion ======
- Syriac Christians establish an early Christian community in Kerala, India.

=== 193 ===
==== By place ====
====== Roman Empire ======
- January 1 – Year of the Five Emperors: The Roman Senate chooses Publius Helvius Pertinax, against his will, to succeed the late Commodus as Emperor. Pertinax is forced to reorganize the handling of finances, which were wrecked under Commodus, to reestablish discipline in the Roman army, and to suspend the food programs established by Trajan, provoking the ire of the Praetorian Guard.
- March 28 – Pertinax is assassinated by members of the Praetorian Guard, who storm the imperial palace. The Empire is auctioned off; Marcus Didius Julianus the highest bidder, offers 300 million sesterces for the throne. Roman governors Clodius Albinus (Britannia) and Pescennius Niger (Syria) claim, with support of their troops, the imperial throne.
- April 14 – Lucius Septimius Severus is proclaimed Emperor by his troops at Carnuntum, in Pannonia Superior (Balkans). He marches with his army to Rome.
- June 1 – Septimius Severus enters the capital, and has Julianus put to death. He replaces the Praetorian Guard with a 15,000-man force from the Danubian legions, and gains control of the Roman Empire, beginning the Severan dynasty.
- Battle of Cyzicus and Battle of Nicaea (Asia Minor): Septimius Severus defeats the army under Pescennius.
- In Britain, Clodius Albinus allies with Septimius Severus, and accepts the title of Caesar. British tribes take advantage of the disorder in the Empire, and damage Hadrian's Wall. Extensive repairs to the defence work is carried out by the legionaries.
- Counterfeiting workshops begin to appear throughout the Roman Empire.
- The Council of Rome, the pre-ecumenical council

====== China ======
- Last (4th) year of Chuping era of the Chinese Han dynasty.
- Cao Cao's invasion of Xu Province: Cao Cao invades Tao Qian's Xu Province, holding him responsible for the death of Cao Song.

==== By topic ====
====== Commerce ======
- The silver content of the Roman denarius falls to 50 percent under emperor Septimius Severus, down from 68 percent under Marcus Aurelius.

=== 194 ===
==== By place ====
====== Roman Empire ======
- Decimus Clodius Septimius Albinus Caesar becomes a Roman Consul.
- Battle of Issus: Septimius Severus marches with his army (12 legions) to Cilicia, and defeats Pescennius Niger, Roman governor of Syria. Pescennius retreats to Antioch, and is executed by Severus' troops.
- Septimius Severus besieges Byzantium (194–196); the city walls suffer extensive damage.

====== Asia ======
- Battle of Yan Province: Warlords Cao Cao and Lü Bu fight for control over Yan Province; the battle lasts for over 100 days.
- First year of the Xingping era, during the Han Dynasty in China.

==== By topic ====
====== Art and Science ======
- Galen writes his manual on pathology, The Art of Curing (approximate date).

====== Religion ======
- Irenaeus declares Gnostic doctrines to be heretical (approximate date).

=== 195 ===
==== By place ====
====== Roman Empire ======
- Emperor Septimius Severus has the Roman Senate deify the previous emperor Commodus, in an attempt to gain favor with the family of Marcus Aurelius.
- King Vologases V and other eastern princes support the claims of Pescennius Niger. The Roman province of Mesopotamia rises in revolt with Parthian support. Severus marches to Mesopotamia to battle the Parthians.
- The Roman province of Syria is divided and the role of Antioch is diminished. The Romans annex the Syrian cities of Edessa and Nisibis. Severus re-establishes his headquarters and the colonies there.
- Lucius Septimius Bassianus (or Caracalla), age 7, changes his name to Marcus Aurelius Antoninus, to solidify connections with the family of Marcus Aurelius, and is given the title Caesar.
- Clodius Albinus, who had been proclaimed emperor in Britain, crosses into Gaul with his legions, while at the same time recruiting new soldiers. He is soon the head of an army of 150,000 men, according to Cassius Dio. Severus, still in Mesopotamia, hastily returns to Rome.
- The denarius is devalued by Severus. The coin now contains only 50% precious metal.

====== China ======
- In China, the Xiongnu federation crosses the Great Wall and establishes itself in Shanxi Province.
- Last (2nd) year of the Xingping era during the Han Dynasty.

=== 196 ===
==== By place ====
====== Roman Empire ======
- Emperor Septimius Severus attempts to assassinate Clodius Albinus but fails, causing Albinus to retaliate militarily.
- Emperor Septimius Severus captures and sacks Byzantium; the city is rebuilt and regains its previous prosperity.
- In order to assure the support of the Roman legion in Germany on his march to Rome, Clodius Albinus is declared Augustus by his army while crossing Gaul.
- Hadrian's Wall in Britain is partially destroyed.

====== China ======
- First year of the Jian'an Era, during the reign of the Xian Emperor of the Han.
- The Xian Emperor returns to war-ravaged Luoyang and seeks the protection of warlord Cao Cao. He is advised to move the capital to Xuchang; the emperor becomes a pawn in the hands of the Chinese warlords.

====== Korea ======
- Naehae becomes king of Silla.

=== 197 ===
==== By place ====
====== Roman Empire ======
- February 19 – Battle of Lugdunum: Emperor Septimius Severus defeats the self-proclaimed emperor Clodius Albinus at Lugdunum (modern Lyon). Albinus commits suicide; legionaries sack the town.
- Septimius Severus returns to Rome and has about 30 of Albinus's supporters in the Senate executed. After his victory he declares himself the adopted son of the late Marcus Aurelius.
- Septimius Severus forms new naval units, manning all the triremes in Italy with heavily armed troops for war in the East. His soldiers embark on an artificial canal between the Tigris and Euphrates.
- Legio I, II, and III Parthica are levied by Septimius Severus for his Parthian campaign.
- The Roman army marches east to repel a Parthian invasion of Mesopotamia; they loot the royal palace at Ctesiphon and capture an enormous number of its inhabitants as slaves.
- Septimius Severus reconstitutes the Province of Mesopotamia under an equestrian governor commanding two legions.
- Septimius Severus, who had spared the Senate at the beginning of his reign, now excludes it from controlling the Roman Empire by declaring a military dictatorship.

====== Asia ======
- Battle of Wancheng: Zhang Xiu launches a surprise attack at Cao Cao.
- Yuan Shu declares himself emperor of the short-lived Zhong dynasty.
- Sansang becomes ruler of the Korean kingdom of Goguryeo.

==== By topic ====
====== Art and Science ======
- Galen's major work on medicines, Pharmacologia, is published.

====== Religion ======
- A Christian council is held in Edessa.

=== 198 ===
==== By place ====
====== Roman Empire ======
- January 28
  - Publius Septimius Geta, son of Septimius Severus, receives the title of Caesar.
  - Caracalla, son of Septimius Severus, is given the title of Augustus.

====== China ======
- Winter – Battle of Xiapi: The allied armies led by Cao Cao and Liu Bei defeat Lü Bu; afterward Cao Cao has him executed.

==== By topic ====
====== Religion ======
- Marcus I succeeds Olympianus as Patriarch of Constantinople (until 211).

=== 199 ===
==== By place ====
====== Roman Empire ======
- Mesopotamia is partitioned into two Roman provinces divided by the Euphrates, Mesopotamia and Osroene.
- Emperor Septimius Severus lays siege to the city-state Hatra in Central-Mesopotamia, but fails to capture the city despite breaching the walls.
- Two new legions, I Parthica and III Parthica, are formed as a permanent garrison.

====== China ======
- Battle of Yijing: Chinese warlord Yuan Shao defeats Gongsun Zan.

====== Korea ======
- Geodeung succeeds Suro of Geumgwan Gaya, as king of the Korean kingdom of Gaya (traditional date).

==== By topic ====
====== Religion ======
- Pope Zephyrinus succeeds Pope Victor I, as the 15th pope.

== Significant people ==
- Septimius Severus, Roman Emperor

== Births ==
190

- Gaius Furius Sabinius Aquila Timesitheus, Roman praetorian prefect (d. 243)
- Liu Yin (or Xiuran), Chinese general of the Shu Han state (d. 269)
- Ma Su, Chinese general and strategist of the Shu Han state (d. 228)
- Quintus Egnatius Proculus, Roman politician (approximate date)
- Wang Ji (or Boyu), Chinese general of the Cao Wei state (d. 261)

191

- Xin Xianying, Chinese noblewoman and advisor (d. 269).

192

- Cao Zhi (or King Chen), Chinese prince and poet (d. 232)
- Gordian II, Roman emperor (Year of the Six Emperors) (d. 238)

193

- Luo Tong, Chinese official of the Eastern Wu state (d. 228)
- Zhang Wen, Chinese official of the Eastern Wu state (d. 230)

194

- Sun Huan (or Jiming), Chinese general (d. 234)
- Zhu Ju, Chinese official and general (d. 250)

195

- Cao Biao (or Zhuhu), Chinese imperial prince (d. 251)
- Gong Lu (or Dexu), Chinese official and politician (d. 225)
- He Yan (or Pingshu), Chinese official and philosopher (d. 249)
- Wang Su, Chinese official and Confucian scholar (d. 256)

196

- Cao Chong, son of Cao Cao (d. 208)

197

- Cao, Chinese empress of the Han Dynasty (d. 260)
- Deng Ai, Chinese general of the Cao Wei state (d. 264)

198

- Lu Kai, Chinese official and general (d. 269)
- Quan Cong, Chinese general and advisor (d. 249)

== Deaths ==
190

- March 6 – Liu Bian, Chinese emperor (poisoned by Dong Zhuo) (b. 176)
- April 19 – Marcus Aurelius Cleander, Roman praetorian prefect
- Athenagoras of Athens, Greek Christian apologist (b. 133)
- Julius of Rome, Roman politician (executed by Commodus)
- Xun Shuang, Chinese politician and writer (b. 128)
- Zhou Bi, Chinese official (executed by Dong Zhuo)
- Emperor Seimu of Japan, according to legend.

191

- Bruttia Crispina, Roman empress (executed) (b. 164)
- Han Fu, Chinese governor and warlord
- Hua Xiong, Chinese general (executed)
- Qiao Mao, Chinese official and warlord
- Sun Jian, Chinese general and warlord (b. 155)
- Vologases IV, king of the Parthian Empire
- Zhang Wen, Chinese official and general

192

- May 22 – Dong Zhuo, Chinese general and warlord (d. 134)
- December 31 – Commodus, Roman emperor (b. 161)
- Annia Fundania Faustina, Roman noblewoman
- Bao Xin, Chinese general and warlord (b. 152)
- Cai Yong, Chinese official and calligrapher (b. 132)
- Liu Dai, Chinese official, general and politician
- Lu Zhi, Chinese scholar and general (b. 159)
- Wang Yun, Chinese official and politician (b. 137)
- Yuan Yi, Chinese official and warlord
- Zhang Zhi, Chinese scholar and calligrapher

193

- March 28 – Pertinax, Roman emperor (assassinated) (b. 126)
- June 1 – Didius Julianus, Roman emperor (assassinated)
- Adrianus (or Hadrian), Greek sophist, philosopher and writer
- Cao Song (or Jugao), Chinese official and father of Cao Cao
- Liu Yu (or Bo'an), Chinese nobleman, official and warlord
- Tiberius Claudius Pompeianus, Roman general and politician

194

- Liu Yan, Chinese warlord and governor
- Ma Midi, Chinese official and politician
- Pescennius Niger, Roman usurper (b. 140)
- Tao Qian, Chinese warlord and governor (b. 132)

195

- Fan Chou, Chinese general and politician
- Huangfu Song (or Yizhen), Chinese general
- Liu Yao, Chinese warlord and governor (b. 157)
- Lu Kang (or Jining), Chinese politician (b. 126)
- Xu Shao (or Zijiang), Chinese official (b. 150)
- Ze Rong, Chinese warlord and Buddhist leader
- Zhang Miao, Chinese warlord and official
- Zhu Jun, Chinese general and official

196

- Beolhyu, Korean ruler of Silla
- Cao Bao, Chinese general and governor
- Chizhi Shizhu Hou, Chinese puppet ruler (b. 150)
- Zhou Xin, Chinese official and politician

197

- February 19 – Clodius Albinus, Roman general and usurper
- Cao Ang (or Zixiu), eldest son of Cao Cao (b. 177)
- Dian Wei, Chinese general serving under Cao Cao
- Gaius Julius Erucius Clarus Vibianus, Roman politician
- Gogukcheon of Goguryeo, Korean ruler of Goguryeo
- Guo Si (or Guo Duo), Chinese general and regent
- Li Jue, Chinese general serving under Dong Zhuo
- Liu Chong, Chinese nobleman and Prince of Chen
- Titus Flavius Claudius Sulpicianus, Roman statesman
- Yang Feng, Chinese general serving under Li Jue

198

- Li Jue, Chinese warlord and regent
- Liu Yao, Chinese governor and warlord (b. 157)
- Mi Heng, Chinese musician and writer (b. 173)
- Zhang Yang, Chinese official and warlord

199

- February 7
  - Gao Shun, Chinese general and advisor
  - Lü Bu, Chinese general and warlord
  - Chen Gong
- Chen Ji, Chinese official, scholar and politician
- Gongsun Zan, Chinese general and warlord
- Qin Yilu (or Qin Yi), Chinese general
- Suro of Geumgwan Gaya, Korean ruler
- Tian Kai, Chinese official and general
- Yuan Shu, Chinese general and warlord
