= 159 =

159 may refer to:

- 159 (number), the natural number following 158 and preceding 160
- AD 159, a year
- 159 BC, a year
- 159 (New Jersey bus), United States
- 159 (telephone number), a UK telephone number
- UFC 159, a mixed martial arts event held by the Ultimate Fighting Championship
- Alfa Romeo 159, a compact executive car
- Alfa Romeo 159, a Grand Prix racing car
- 159 series, an electric multiple unit rain type
- Lectionary 159, a Greek manuscript of the New Testament
- British Rail Class 159, a DMU train used in the UK
