= 189 =

189 may refer to:

- 189 BC
- AD 189
- 189 (number)
- UFC 189
- 189 Phthia
- Interstate 189
- Lectionary 189
- NGC 189

== See also ==
- 189th (disambiguation)
