= 157 =

157 may refer to:

- 157 (number), the natural number following 156 and preceding 158
- AD 157, a year
- 157 BC, a year
- 157 (New Jersey bus), United States
- 157 (Welsh) Regiment RLC
- UFC 157, a mixed martial arts event held by the Ultimate Fighting Championship
- ONE 157, a combat sport event produced by ONE Championship
- Radical 157, one of the 20 Kangxi radicals composed of 7 strokes meaning "foot"
- NGC 157, an intermediate spiral galaxy in the constellation of Cetus
- 157 series, a DC electric multiple unit train type
- Tatra 157, the prototype version of the Tatra 815
- BPC-157, a peptide
