= Tōkai (train) =

Limited express train service between Tokyo and Shizuoka stations

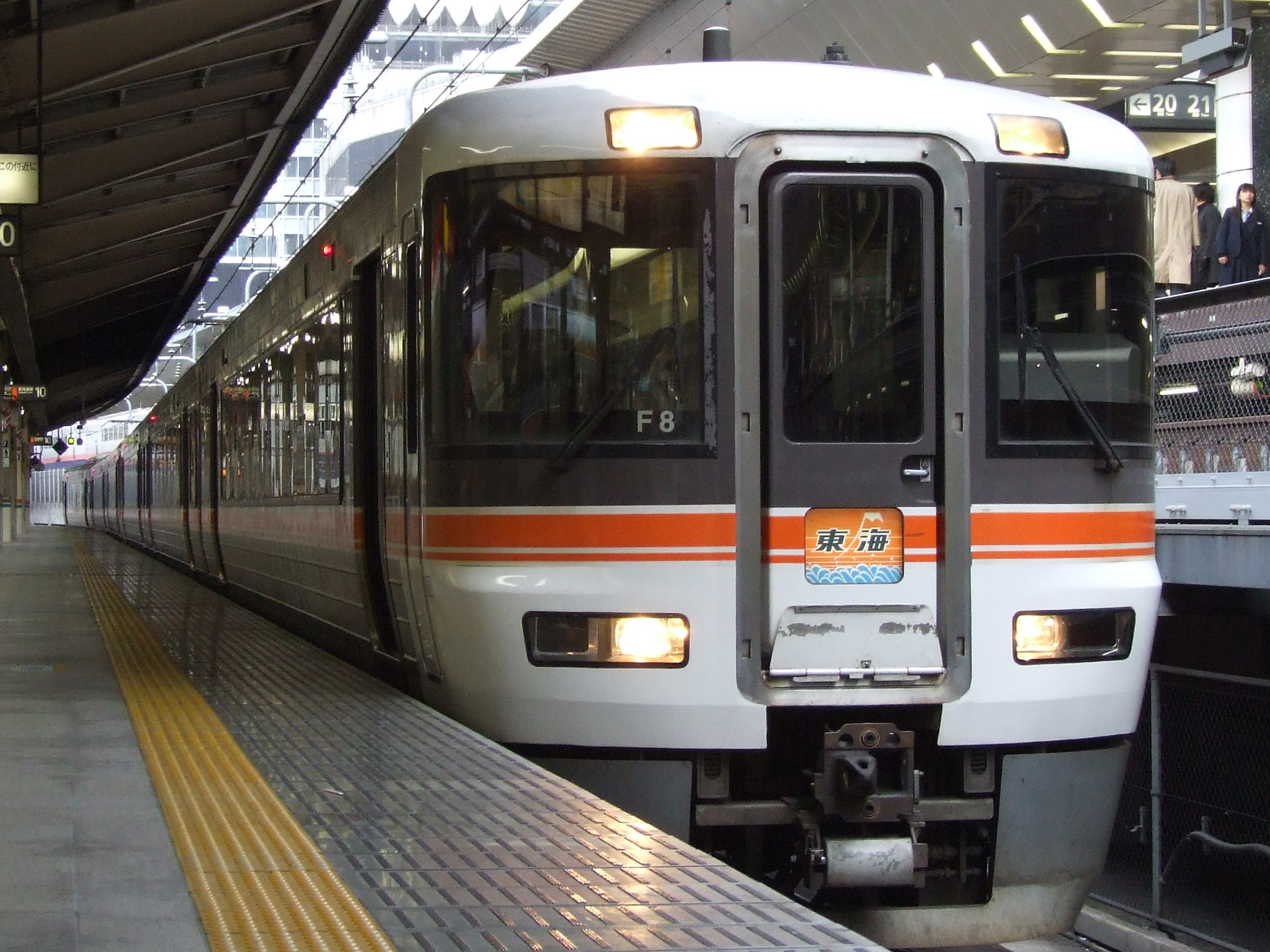
- 373 series EMU on a Tōkai service, March 2006

Overview
- Service type: Limited express (from 1996)
- First service: 1955 (Semi express); 1996 (Limited express Wide View Tōkai)
- Last service: 2007
- Current operators: JR East (Tokyo–Atami); JR Central (Atami–Shizuoka)

Route
- Line used: Tōkaidō Main Line

Technical
- Rolling stock: 373 series (1996–2007)

The Tōkai (東海) was a limited express service which connected Tokyo Station and Shizuoka Station in Japan. The service was discontinued in March 2007 due to declining passenger numbers.

== Stops ==
Trains stopped at the following stations:

Tokyo – Shinagawa – Kawasaki – Yokohama – Ōfuna – Hiratsuka – Odawara – Yugawara – Atami – Mishima – Numazu – Fuji – Shimizu – Shizuoka

== Rolling stock ==
- 1955–1957: Locomotive-hauled
- 1957–1958: JNR 80 series EMUs
- 1958– March 1982: JNR 153 series EMUs
- 1968–1996: JNR 165 series EMUs
- 16 March 1996 – 17 March 2007: JR Central 373 series EMUs (as Wide View Tōkai)
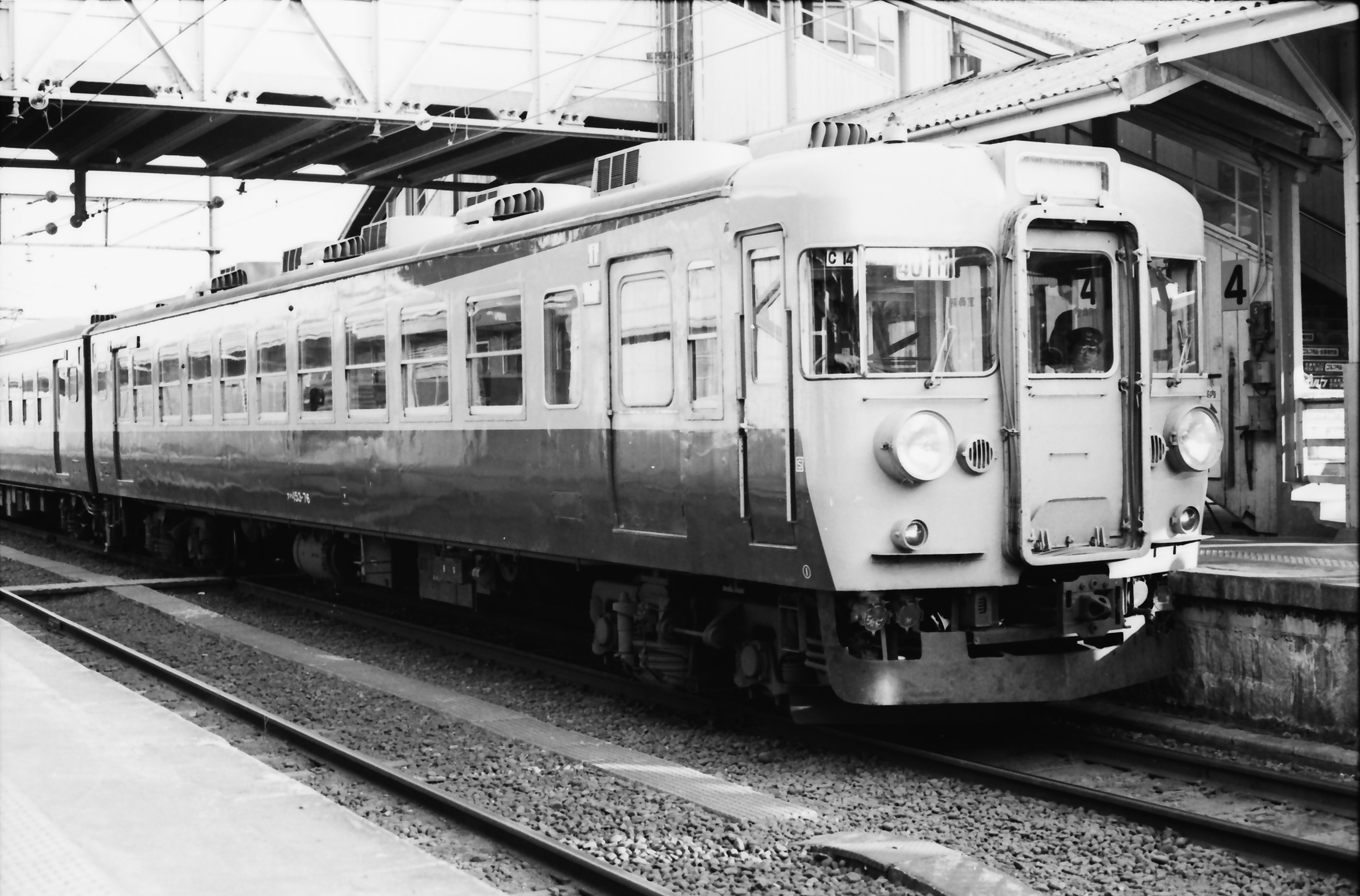
A 153 series EMU in 1982

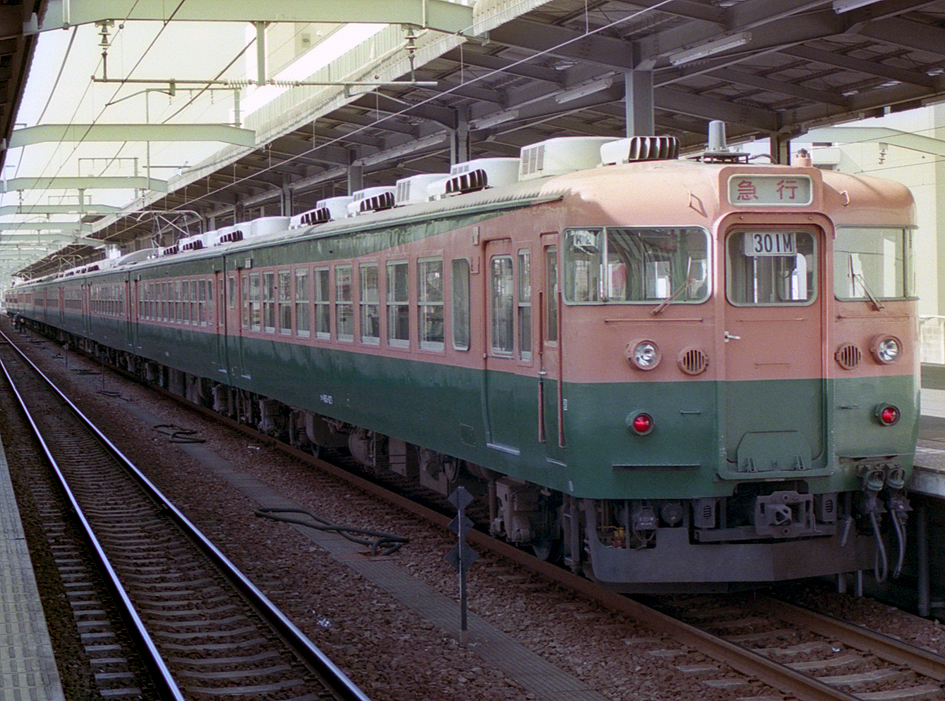
165 series EMU on a Tōkai express service in 1986

== History ==
The Tōkai service was first introduced by Japanese National Railways (JNR) on 20 July 1955 as a locomotive-hauled semi express train operating between Tokyo and Nagoya. The train was upgraded to "express" status from 5 March 1966. From 16 March 1996, the service was upgraded to become the limited express Wide View Tōkai using pairs of new 373 series 3-car EMU trainsets, with two return workings daily between Tokyo and Shizuoka.
