= 189th Regiment =

189th Regiment may refer to:

- 189th Aviation Regiment, United States
- 189th Regiment (United States)
- 189th New York Infantry Regiment, Union Army
- 189th Ohio Infantry Regiment, Union Army

== See also ==
- 189th (disambiguation)
