= 189th Division =

189th Division may refer to:

- 189th Division (2nd Formation) (People's Republic of China)
- 189th Infantry Division (Wehrmacht), Germany
- 189th Rifle Division, Soviet Union

== See also ==
- List of military divisions by number
- 189th Regiment (disambiguation)
- 189th (disambiguation)
