= 152 =

152 may refer to:

- 152 (number), the natural number following 151 and preceding 153
- AD 152, a year
- 152 BC, a year
- Cessna 152, an American two-seat airplane
- Baade 152, Dresden 152 or VL-DDR 152, an East German aircraft
- UFC 152, a mixed martial arts event
- 152 (album), a 2023 studio album by Taking Back Sunday
- 152 Atala, a main-belt asteroid
- 152 (North Irish) Regiment RLC

== See also ==
- Flight 152 (disambiguation)
