= 155 series =

Japanese electric multiple unit train type

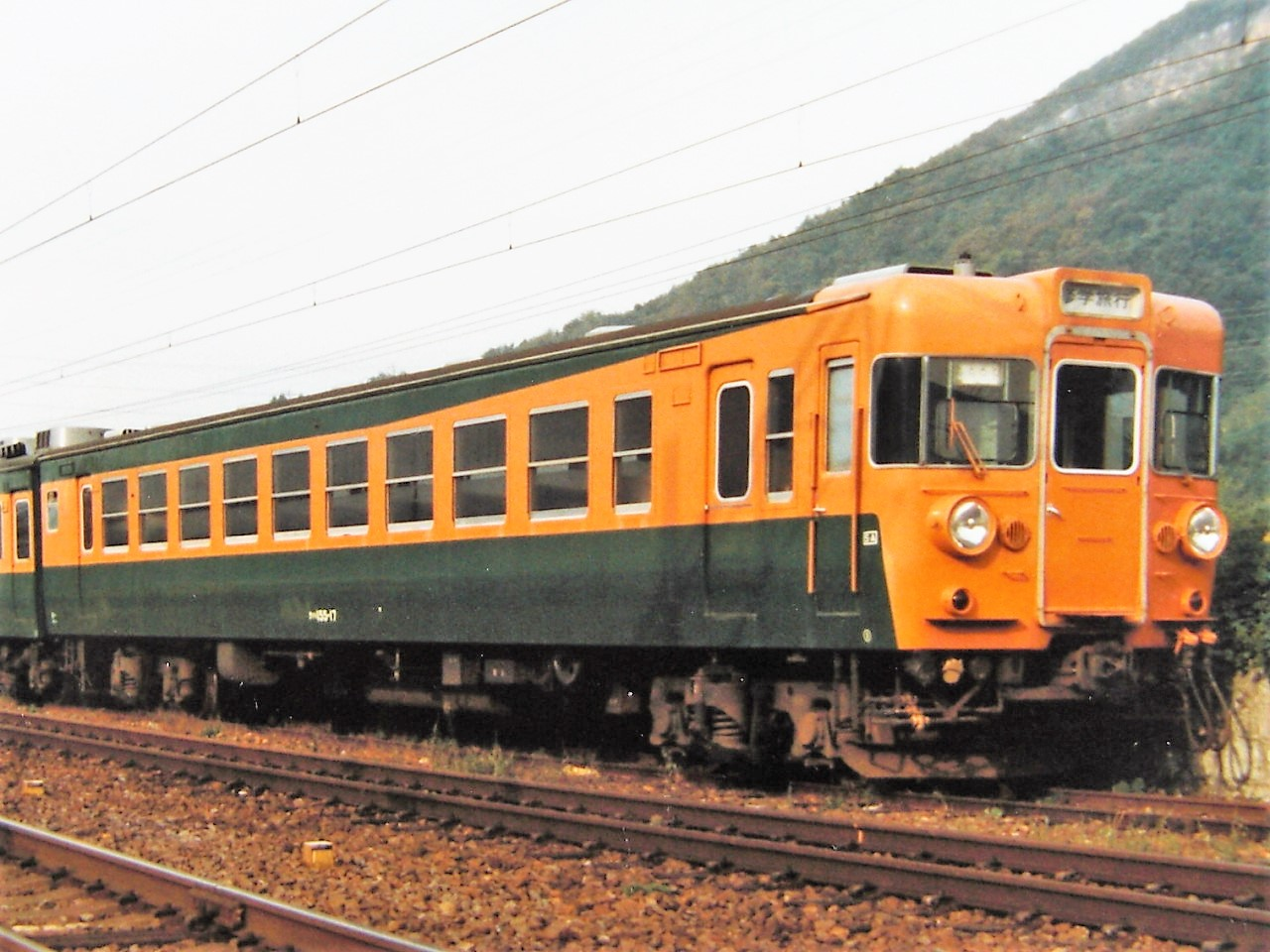
- A 155 series EMU in Shonan orange and green livery
- In service: 1959–1983
- Manufacturers: Kisha Seizo, Nippon Sharyo
- Constructed: 1959–1965
- Refurbished: 1975
- Number built: 48 vehicles (10 sets)
- Number in service: None
- Number preserved: None
- Formation: 4/8 cars per set
- Operator: JNR
- Depots: Tamachi, Miyahara

Specifications
- Car body construction: Steel
- Doors: 2 per side
- Maximum speed: 110 km/h (70 mph)
- Traction system: Resistor control MT46
- Electric system: 1,500 V DC
- Bogies: DT21A, TR62
- Track gauge: 1,067 mm (3 ft 6 in)

The 155 series (155系) was an electric multiple unit (EMU) train type operated by Japanese National Railways (JNR) from 1959 until 1983. They were originally designed for and used on school excursion trains running between Tokyo and the "Keihanshin" Kyoto/Osaka/Kobe area via the Tokaido Main Line.

== Design ==
Initially classified "82 series", the 155 series was broadly derived from the earlier 153 series express EMU design.

=== Exterior ===
The trains were initially painted in what was to become the standard JNR excursion train livery of "lemon yellow" and "light scarlet" selected from colour schemes proposed by 313 different junior high schools in the Tokyo and Keihanshin areas. Later sets built used "canary yellow", a slightly different shade to the original "lemon yellow" colour.

=== Interior ===
The primary purpose of the trains was to maximize seating capacity for use on school excursions, so accommodation was arranged in fixed seating bays, with 4-seat bays on one side and 6-seat bays on the other side of the aisle, giving a seating capacity of approximately 100 per car. The trains were not air-conditioned, but featured ceiling-mounted fans.

=== Bogies ===
The motored cars were mounted on DT21A coil-spring bogies based on the bogies used on the 101 series commuter EMUs. The non-motored trailer cars were mounted on TR62 bogies.

== Formations ==
The fleet consisted of two 8-car and eight 4-car sets, formed as shown below, and based at Tamachi Depot in Tokyo and Miyahara Depot in Kyoto. These initially ran as 12-car formations, later lengthened to 16-car formations.

=== 8-car sets ===
Designation	Tc	M'	M	T	T	M'	M	Tc
Numbering	KuHa 155	MoHa 154	MoHa 155	SaHa 155	SaHa 155	MoHa 154	MoHa 155	KuHa 155

- The MoHa 154 cars were each equipped with one lozenge-type pantograph.

=== 4-car sets ===
Designation	Tc	M'	M	Tc
Numbering	KuHa 155	MoHa 154	MoHa 155	KuHa 155

- The MoHa 154 cars were each equipped with one lozenge-type pantograph.

=== Key ===
- Tc: driving trailer
- T: intermediate trailer
- M: intermediate motor with control equipment
- M': intermediate motor

== History ==
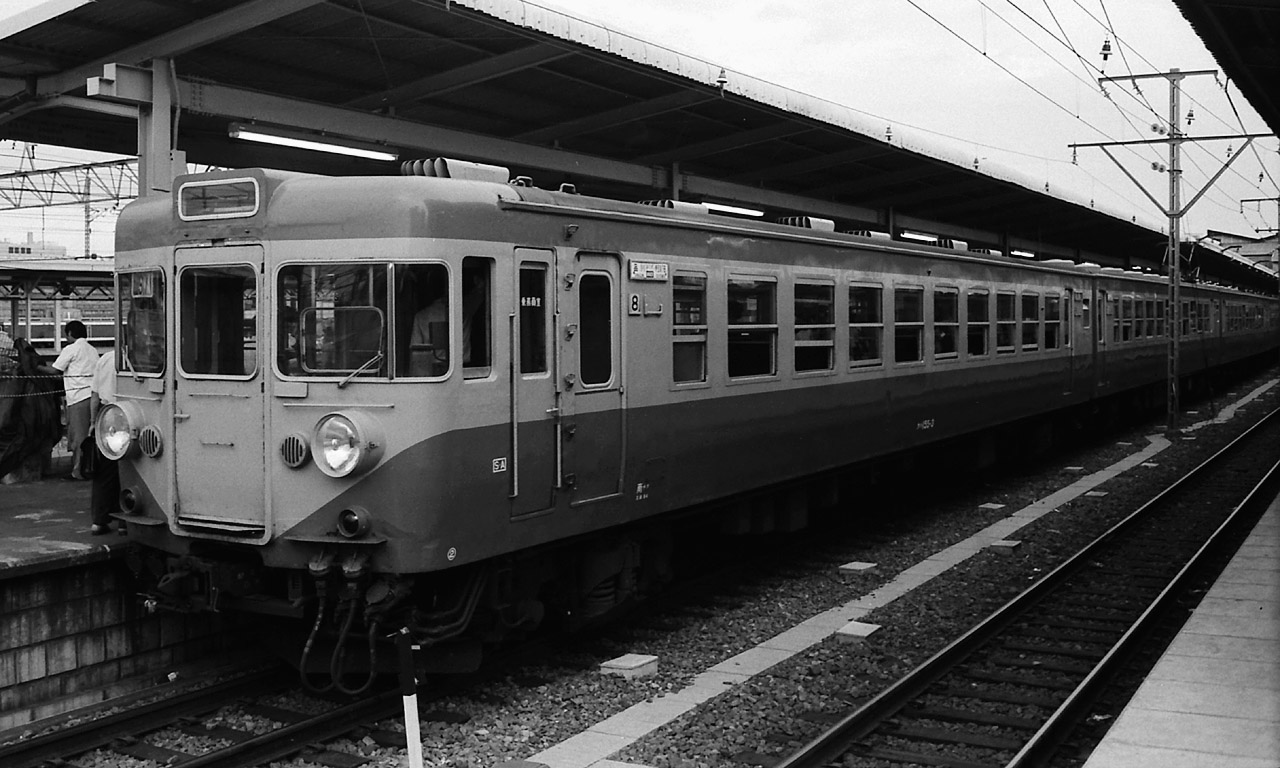
A 155 series set on an Izu service in August 1974, still in original school excursion train livery

The 155 series sets entered service from March 1959 on school excursion services running on the Tokaido Main Line. Westbound services from Tokyo (Shinagawa Station) were named Hinode (ひので; "Sunrise"), and eastbound services from the Keihanshin area were named Kibō (きぼう; "Hope"). Trains carried headboards on the front with the name of the train. A further two 4-car sets were built in 1961, and four more 4-car sets were built between 1964 and 1965, to allow 16-car formations to be used on Hinode and Kibō services.

From March 1971, school excursions began using Kodama services on the Tokaido Shinkansen between Tokyo and the Keihanshin area, and the Tokaido Line Hinode and Kibō services were discontinued from October of the same year. The 155 series trains underwent refurbishment and repainting into the Shonan livery of orange and green from 1973, and the former Kansai area sets were transferred to Ogaki Depot in 1974 for use on "rapid" limited-stop services and charter train services. The Tamachi-based Tokyo area sets saw use on school excursions to Nikko, and winter season trains to ski resorts in the Joetsu region.

Withdrawals began in 1980, and the entire fleet was withdrawn from service by fiscal 1983. No 155 series vehicles have been preserved.

== See also ==
- 159 series
- 167 series
