= 167 series =

Japanese train type

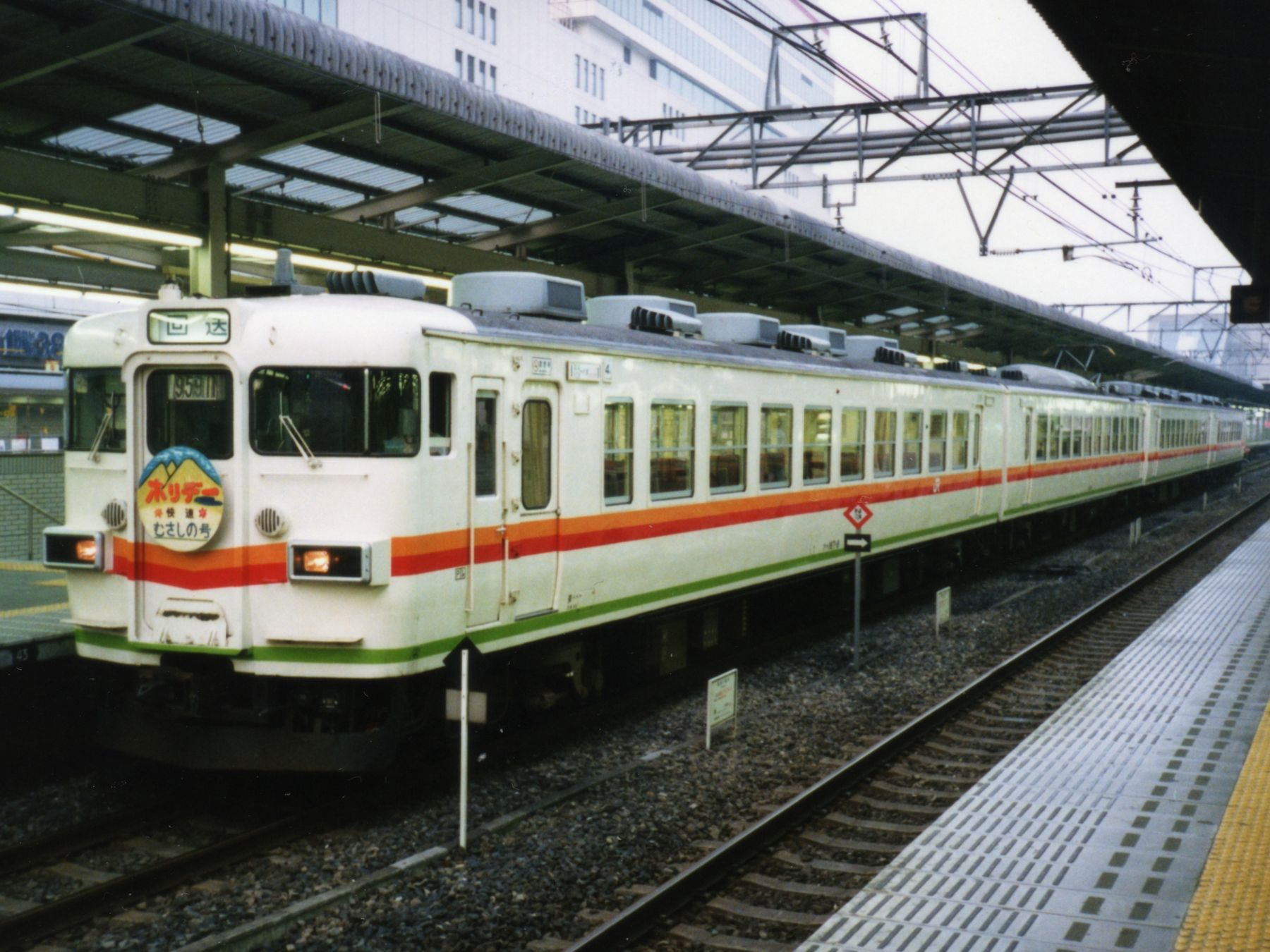
- A refurbished JR East set in July 1992
- In service: 1965–2003
- Manufacturer: Kisha Seizo
- Number in service: 0
- Formation: 4 cars per set
- Operators: JNR (1965–1987); JR East (1987–2003); JR-West (1987–2001)
- Depots: Tamachi, Miyahara

Specifications
- Car body construction: Steel
- Doors: 2 per side
- Traction system: Resistor control
- Power output: 120 kW per motor
- Electric system: 1,500 V DC
- Track gauge: 1,067 mm (3 ft 6 in)

The 167 series (167系, 167-kei) was an electric multiple unit (EMU) train type introduced in 1965 by Japanese National Railways (JNR), and later operated by East Japan Railway Company (JR East) and West Japan Railway Company (JR-West) until 2003.

== History ==
The 167 series trains were developed from the earlier 165 series express-type EMU, and were introduced from 1965 for use on school excursion services. They were originally painted in the JNR excursion train livery of yellow No. 5 and red No. 3.

Following the privatization of JNR in 1987, JR East received 35 167 series vehicles, allocated to Tamachi Depot in Tokyo, and JR-West received 16 vehicles, allocated to Miyahara Depot. The JR West fleet was withdrawn by 2001, and the JR East fleet was withdrawn by 2003.

No 167 series vehicles have been preserved.

== See also ==
- 155 series, the first dedicated school excursion EMUs, introduced 1959
- 159 series, school excursion EMUs introduced in 1961
- 169 series
