= SN 2022jli =

Type Ic supernova

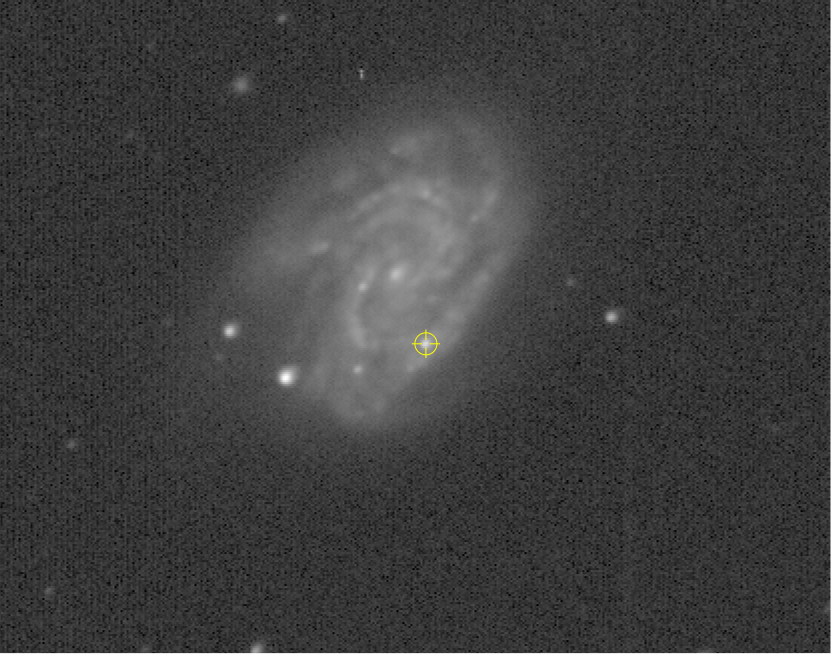
- SN 2022jli on 3 July 2022 by ZTF
- Ic
- Discovered: May 5, 2022
- Constellation: Cetus
- Right ascension: 00^{h} 34^{m} 45.694^{s}
- Declination: −08° 23′ 12.16″
- Distance: 23 Mpc
- Redshift: 0.005546
- Host: NGC 157
- Notable features: the only supernova that shows periodicity in its light curve
- Peak apparent magnitude: 14

SN 2022jli is a Type Ic supernova discovered in 2022 in the spiral galaxy NGC 157 at a distance of about 23 Mpc. The light curve of the supernova exhibited oscillations that are interpreted as an interaction of a companion star of the star that exploded with a compact object, probably a neutron star or a black hole.

== Discovery ==
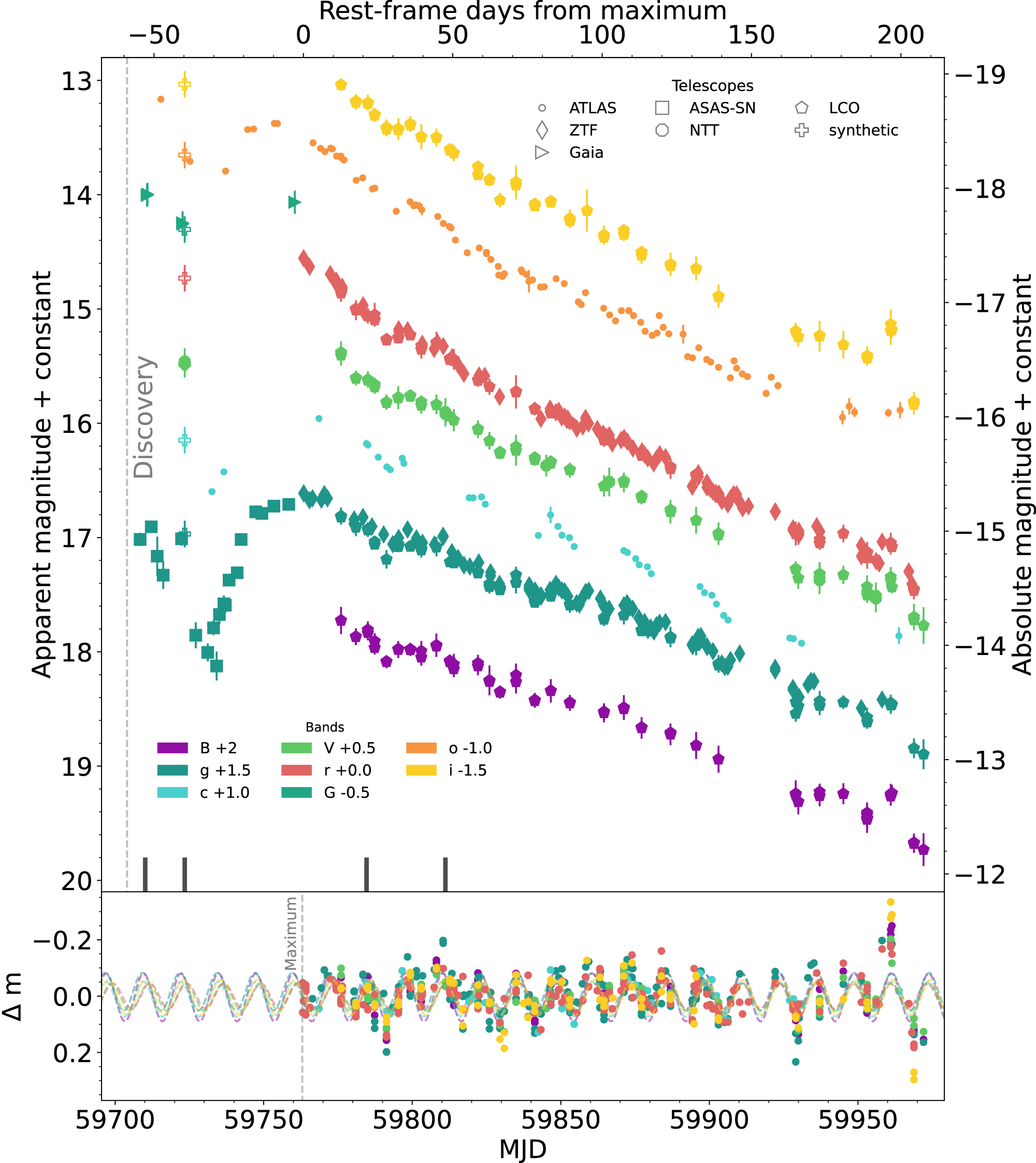
Top: multicolor extinction-corrected light curves of SN 2022jli including photometric errors. Black lines along the bottom of the plot indicate spectroscopic observations. Open symbols are synthetic photometry performed on the EFOSC2 spectrum. Bottom: light curves after detrending with a second-degree polynomial fit including only the region after maximum light (vertical dashed line).

SN 2022jli was discovered by astronomer Libert Monard at Kleinkaroo Observatory, who reported it to the Transient Name Server (TNS) on May 5, 2022, as AT 2022jli. The supernova was offset 35.2″ north and 15.88″ west of the NGC 157 galactic core. It was independently detected by the Asteroid Terrestrial-impact Last Alert System (ATLAS) survey on May 16, 2022, and given the internal name ATLAS22oat. Due to an initial astrometric error in the TNS report, ATLAS incorrectly registered it as a separate object AT 2022jzy. This duplication was later removed from TNS records to confirm both discoveries as the same supernova SN 2022jli.

Another supernova found in NGC 157 is SN 2009em.

== Observations ==
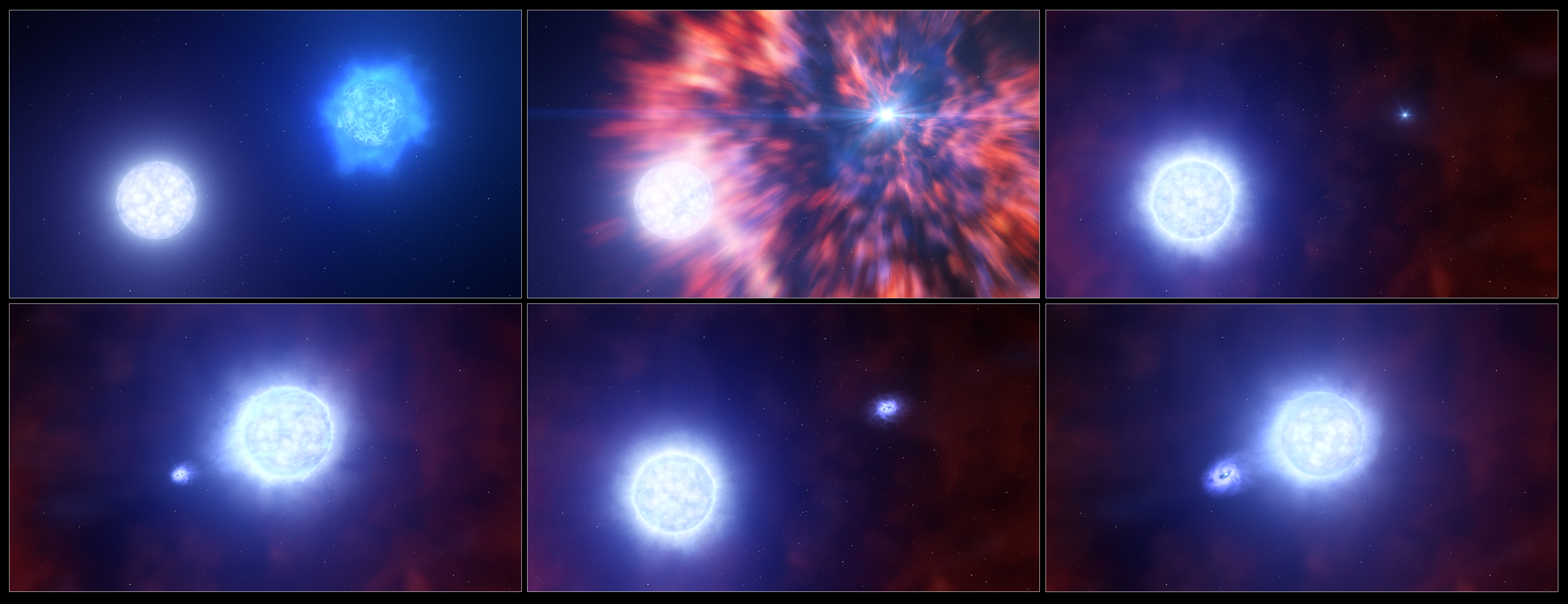
Artist’s impression of the SN 2022jli supernova event

Photometry of SN 2022jli was obtained by the Zwicky Transient Facility (internal name ZTF22aapubuy), ESA's Gaia space telescope (internal name Gaia22cbu), ASAS-SN, Liverpool Telescope, Las Cumbres Observatory, and the Neil Gehrels Swift Observatory. A single radio observation was made with MERLIN.

The extensive photometric observations reveal periodic undulations or bumps in the declining light curve with a period of 12.5 ± 0.2 days. This repeating pattern of oscillations is observed across multiple filters and instruments over many cycles, the first unambiguous detection of periodicity in a supernova light curve. SN 2022jli displays an extreme early excess in luminosity that declines over about 25 days before rising to the main peak. The total rise time to maximum brightness is ≥59 days, much longer than typical for stripped-envelope core-collapse supernovae. At peak luminosity of 10^42.1 erg/s, SN 2022jli is within the normal brightness range for Type Ic supernovae. Simple light curve modeling indicates a large ejecta mass around 12 ± 6 solar masses. Spectra show features typical of Type Ic supernovae, with iron, calcium and sodium P Cygni profiles. The velocities derived from Fe II lines are initially high at 8500 km/s but decline slowly over time. The source of the early excess and periodic oscillations is uncertain, but plausible explanations include interaction of the ejecta with circumstellar material or a binary companion star. The periodicity may arise from concentric shells of CSM or repeated episodes of accretion onto a compact object.
