= 165 series =

Japanese express electric multiple unit train type

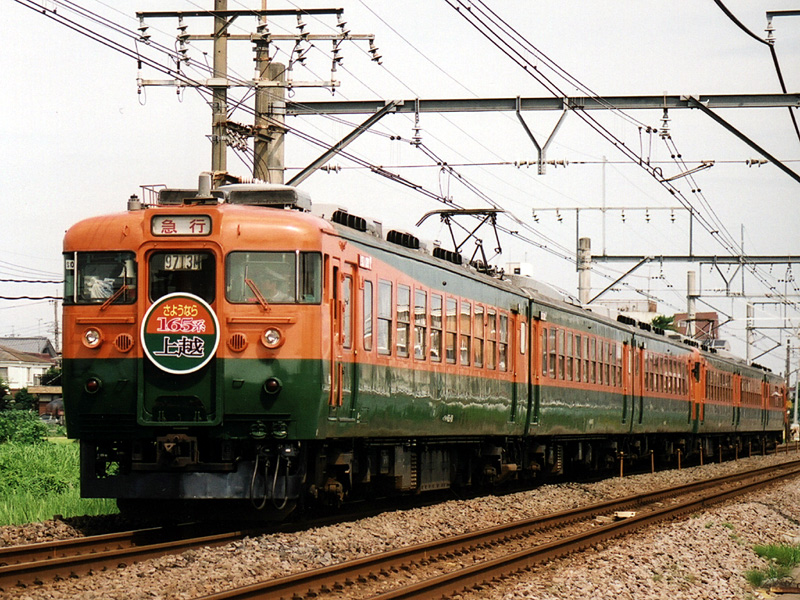
- Final run of 165 series in June 2003
- In service: 1963–2003
- Manufacturers: Kawasaki Heavy Industries, Kinki Sharyo, Kisha Seizo, Nippon Sharyo, Teikoku Sharyo, Tokyu Car Corporation
- Constructed: 1963-1970
- Entered service: 25 March 1963
- Scrapped: 2009
- Number built: 701 cars
- Number in service: None
- Number preserved: 3 cars
- Number scrapped: 698 cars
- Successor: 107 series, 313 series
- Formation: 3, 4, 6 cars per set
- Operators: JNR (1963-1987); JR East (1987-2003); JR Central (1987-2003); JR-West (1987-2003)

Specifications
- Car body construction: Steel
- Doors: 2 per side (except buffet car)
- Maximum speed: 110 km/h (70 mph)
- Traction system: Resistor control
- Traction motors: MT54 (120kW)
- Power output: 120 kW per motor
- Electric system: 1,500 V DC
- Bogies: DT32, TR69
- Safety systems: ATS-S, ATS-P
- Track gauge: 1,067 mm (3 ft 6 in)

The 165 series (165系, 165-kei) was an express electric multiple unit (EMU) train type introduced in 1963 by Japanese National Railways (JNR).

== History ==
During the early 1960s, the Chūō Main Line and Shinetsu Line were electrified, requiring new EMUs for the express services. New powerful trains were required, as the earlier 153 series trains were designed for operation in flat, warm areas.

=== Differences between 153 series and 165 series ===
- Motor output increased from 100 kW to 120 kW
- Proofing against heavy snow and cold weather

=== Individual car types (original) ===
- KuMoHa 165: Motorized cab car. 76 seats. 145 cars were built from 1963 to 1970. Coupled to MoHa 164.
- KuHa 165: Cab car. 76 seats. 210 cars were built from 1963 to 1970.
- MoHa 164: Motorized car with pantograph, air compressor and motor-generator. 84 seats. 166 cars were built from 1963 to 1970.
- Moha 165: Motorized car. 84 seats. 21 cars were built from 1963 to 1969. Coupled to MoHa 164.
- SaHa 164: Intermediate trailer car. 56 seats. Only two cars were built in 1966. With kiosk.
- SaHa 165: Intermediate trailer car. 84 seats. 11 cars were built in 1969.
- SaRo 165: Intermediate trailer car. Green car.
- SaHaShi 165: Intermediate trailer car. Buffet and seating. 36 seats. 12 cars were built in 1963. Soba corner instead of 153 series Sushi corner.

== Joyful Train conversions ==
A number of 165 series trains were converted for use as Joyful Train sets including the following.

- Nanohana: First EMU-based Joyful Train, introduced in March 1986 and withdrawn August 1998.
- Panorama Express Alps: 3+3-car set converted in 1986 for use on the Chūō Main Line and the Ōito Line. This train was withdrawn in 2001, and sold to Fuji Kyuko in 2002, becoming the Fujikyu 2000 series Fujisan Express.
- Shuttle Maihama
- Yū Yū Tōkai
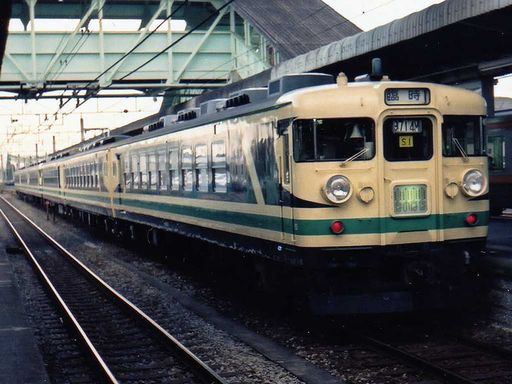
165 series Nanohana set, circa 1990

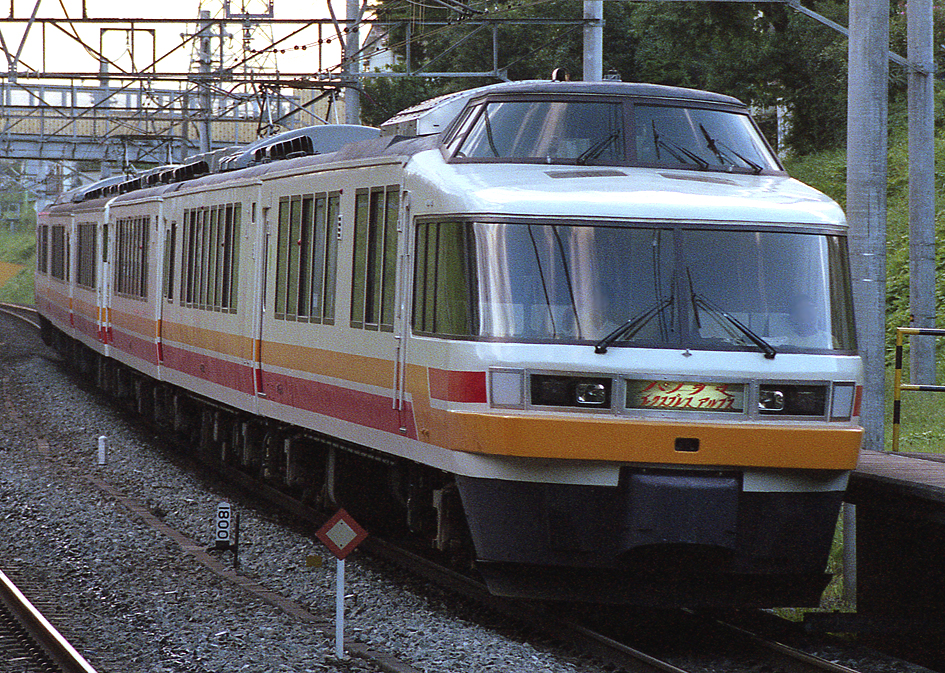
165 series Panorama Express Alps Joyful Train

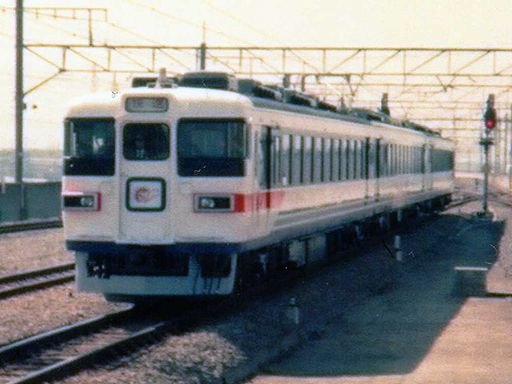
165 series Shuttle Maihama set in March 1990

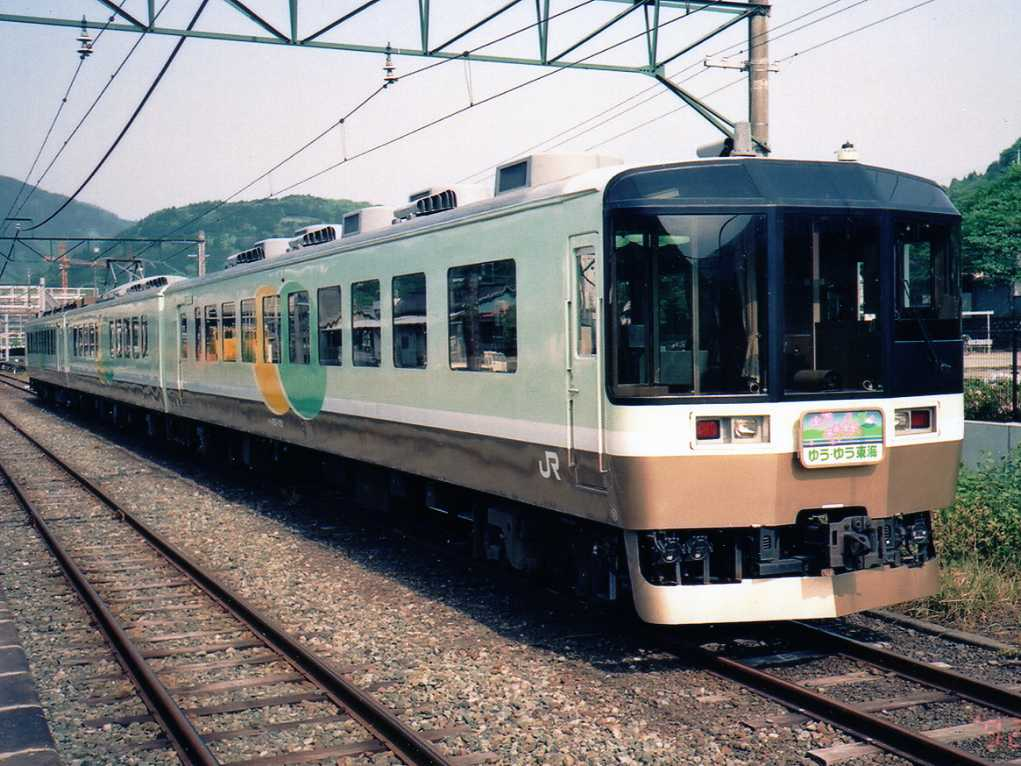
The Yū Yū Tōkai joyful train on Yamakita station in 1992

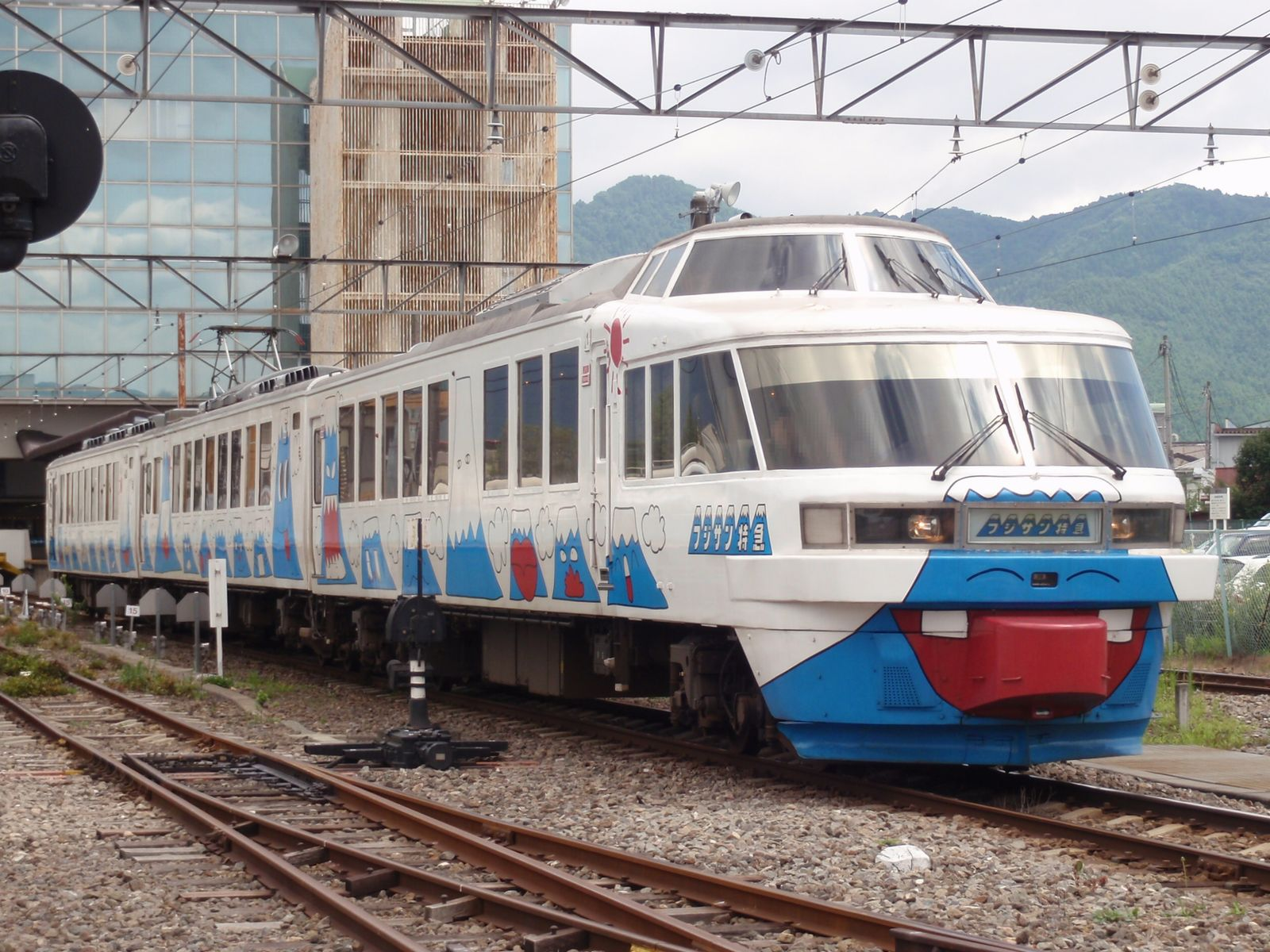
Fuji Kyuko 2000 series Fujisan Express in August 2009

== Resale ==
Nine withdrawn 165 series cars were sold to the Chichibu Railway in 1992 and converted to become Chichibu Railway 3000 series 3-car sets for use on express services.

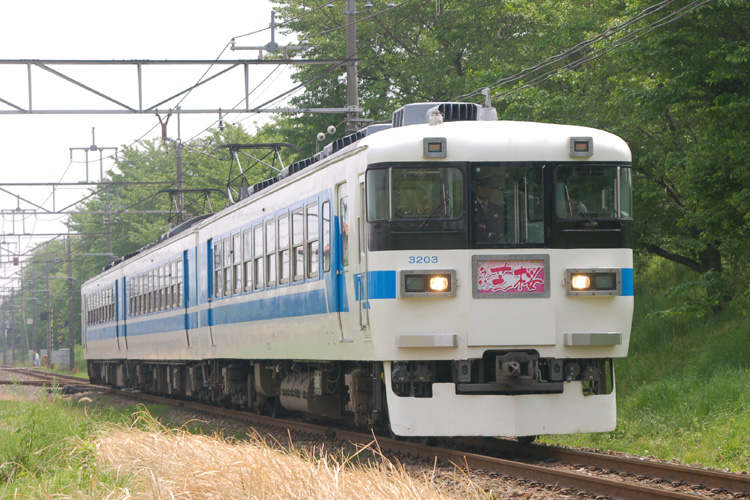
A Chichibu Railway 3000 series EMU, May 2006

== Preserved examples ==
- KuHa 165-120, stored for a long period at Mino-Ōta Depot in Minokamo, Gifu, before being moved by road to Hamamatsu Depot in February 2013
- KuMoHa 165-108, (built 1966 by Tokyu Car) at SCMaglev and Railway Park, Nagoya
- MoHa 164-72, stored at Mino-Ōta Depot in Minokamo, Gifu
- SaRo 165-106, (built 1967 by Teikoku Sharyo) at SCMaglev and Railway Park, Nagoya
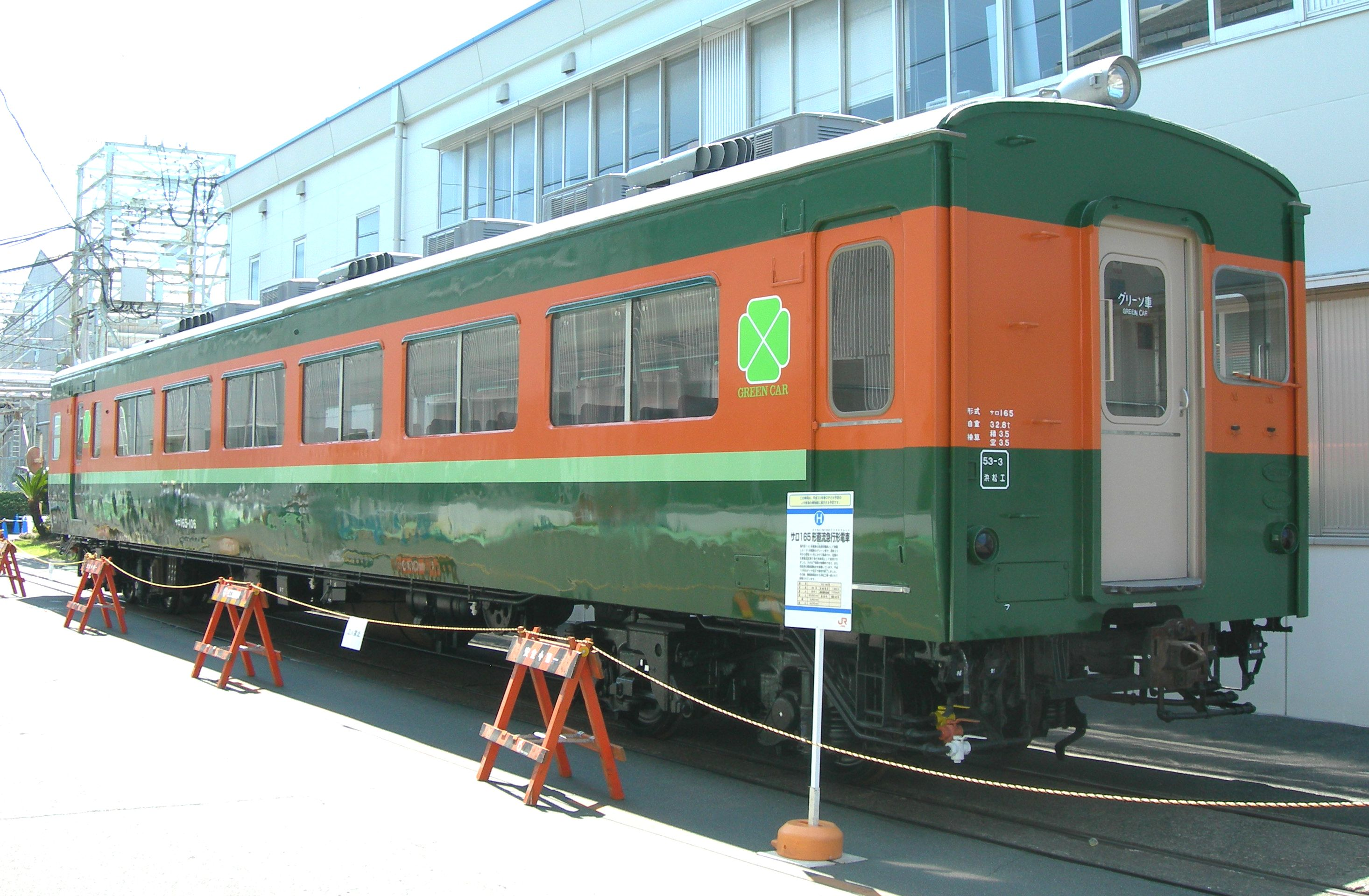
SaRo 165–106, preserved at Hamamatsu Works, July 2010

== See also ==
- 167 series
- 169 series
