= Radical 103 =

Chinese character radical

疋
- Radical 103 (U+2F66)
- 疋 (U+758B) "bolt of cloth"

Pronunciations
- Pinyin: pǐ
- Bopomofo: ㄆㄧˇ
- Wade–Giles: p'i3
- Cantonese Yale: pat1
- Jyutping: pat1
- Japanese Kana: ショ sho / ソ so / ガ ga / ゲ ge (on'yomi) あし ashi / ひき hiki (kun'yomi)
- Sino-Korean: 소 so

Names
- Japanese name(s): 疋/ひき hiki (𤴔) 疋偏/ひきへん hikihen
- Hangul: 발 bal

Stroke order animation

Stroke order of the component form 𤴔

Radical 103 or radical bolt of cloth (疋部) meaning "bolt of cloth" is one of the 23 Kangxi radicals (214 radicals in total) composed of 5 strokes. When appearing at the left side of a character, it transforms into 𤴔.

In the Kangxi Dictionary, there are 15 characters (out of 49,030) to be found under this radical.

疋 is also the 118th indexing component in the Table of Indexing Chinese Character Components predominantly adopted by Simplified Chinese dictionaries published in mainland China, with 𤴔 being its associated indexing component.

== Evolution ==
Similar to 足.

Shang dynasty Oracle bone script

Large seal script character

Small seal script character

== Derived characters ==
Strokes	Characters
+0	疋
+3	疌
+5	疍
+6	疏
+7	疎
+9	疐 疑

== Literature ==
- Fazzioli, Edoardo (1987). Chinese calligraphy : from pictograph to ideogram : the history of 214 essential Chinese/Japanese characters. calligraphy by Rebecca Hon Ko. New York: Abbeville Press. ISBN 0-89659-774-1.
- Lunde, Ken (Jan 5, 2009). "Appendix J: Japanese Character Sets" (PDF). CJKV Information Processing: Chinese, Japanese, Korean & Vietnamese Computing (Second ed.). Sebastopol, Calif.: O'Reilly Media. ISBN 978-0-596-51447-1.
