= 107 series =

Japanese train type

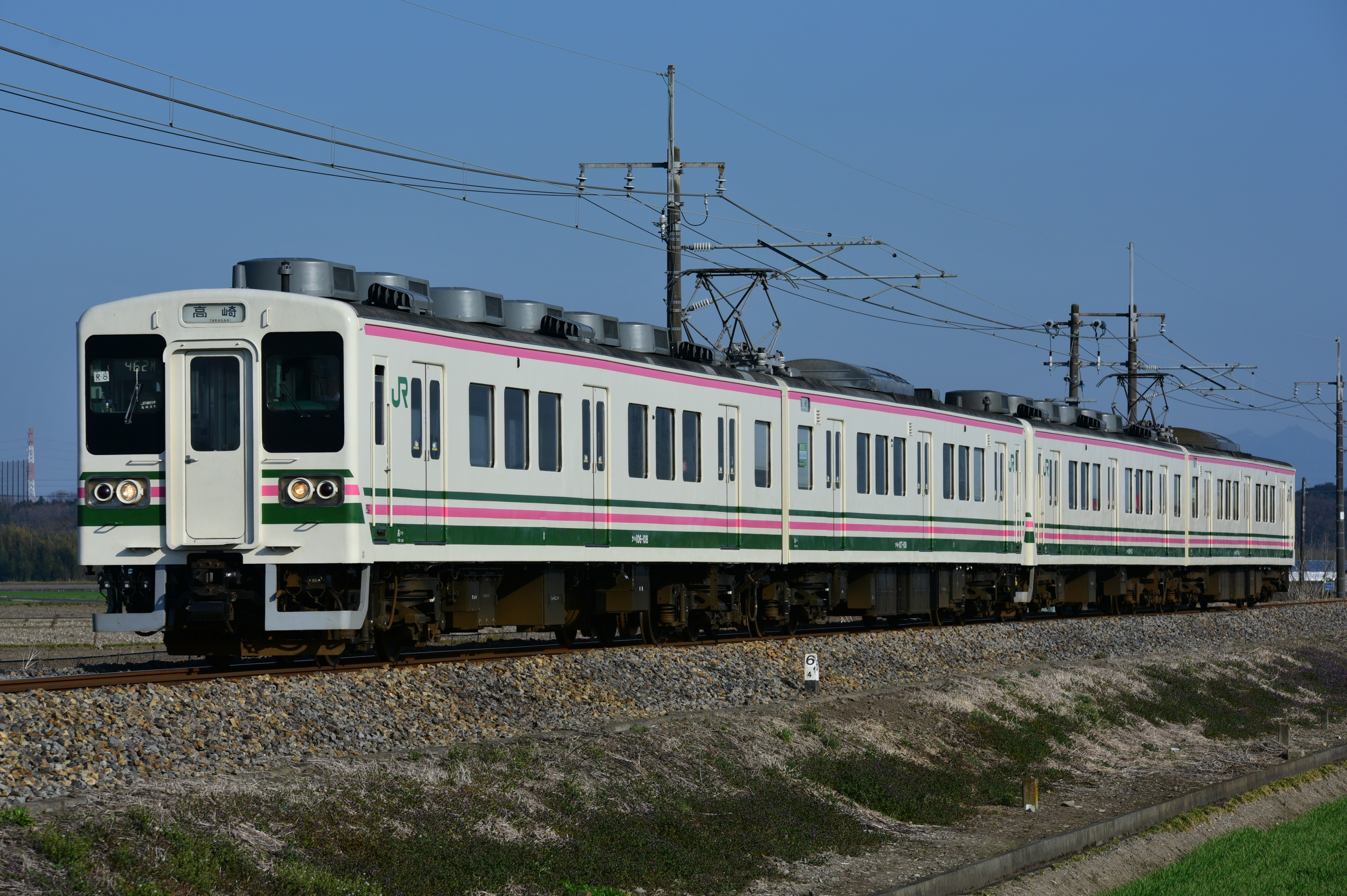
- A pair of 107-100 series sets on the Ryomo Line in March 2016
- In service: 1988 – October 2017
- Manufacturer: JR East
- Built at: Koriyama, Niitsu, Nagano, Omiya, Oi, Ofuna
- Replaced: 165 series
- Constructed: 1988–1991
- Entered service: 1988
- Scrapped: 2013–
- Number built: 54 vehicles (27 sets)
- Number in service: None
- Number scrapped: 42 vehicles (21 sets)
- Successor: 205 series
- Formation: 2 cars per trainset
- Operator: JR East
- Depots: Oyama, Takasaki
- Lines served: Agatsuma Line; Jōetsu Line; Nikkō Line; Ryōmō Line; Shin'etsu Main Line

Specifications
- Car body construction: Steel
- Car length: 20,000 mm (65 ft 7 in)
- Width: 2,800 mm (9 ft 2 in)
- Doors: 3 pairs per side
- Maximum speed: 100 km/h (60 mph)
- Traction system: Resistor control
- Electric system: 1,500 V DC
- Current collection: Overhead catenary
- Safety system: ATS-P
- Track gauge: 1,067 mm (3 ft 6 in)

The 107 series (107系) was a DC electric multiple unit (EMU) train type that was operated on local services by East Japan Railway Company (JR East) in Japan from 1988 to 2017.

== Variants ==
- 107-0 series: 8 x two-car sets formerly used on Nikko Line services (until March 2013)
- 107-100 series: 19 x two-car sets formerly used on Ryomo Line, Agatsuma Line, Joetsu Line, and Shinetsu Main Line services

== Design ==
The 107 series trains were the first EMUs to be built by JR East following the splitting of the former Japanese National Railways (JNR), and reused components such as bogies and air-conditioning units from withdrawn 165 series EMUs.

== 107-0 series ==
Eight two-car sets (sets N1 to N8) were allocated to Oyama Depot for use on Nikko Line local services. The units entered service on 1 June 1988, and were originally painted in a livery designed by a Tochigi high school student, featuring large green "N" logos on a cream base. A new "retro" livery of brown and cream was introduced from March 2009, with the last train in original livery running until 17 January 2010. The 107-0 series sets were withdrawn from service on the Nikko Line on 15 March 2013.

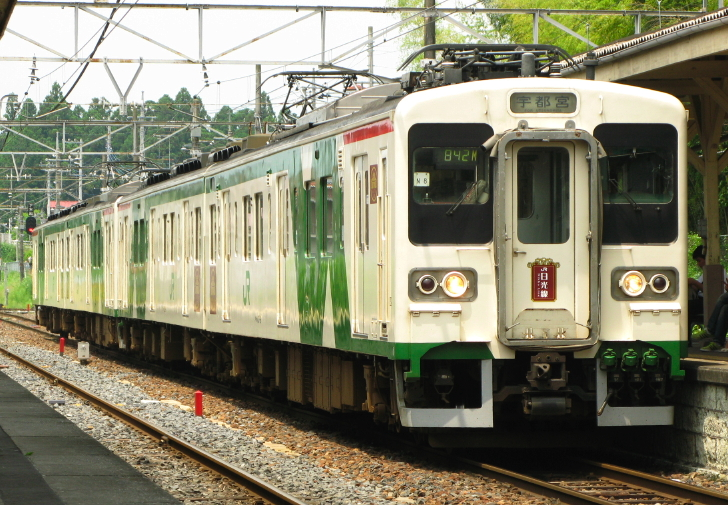
107-0 series set N8 in original Nikko Line livery in June 2008

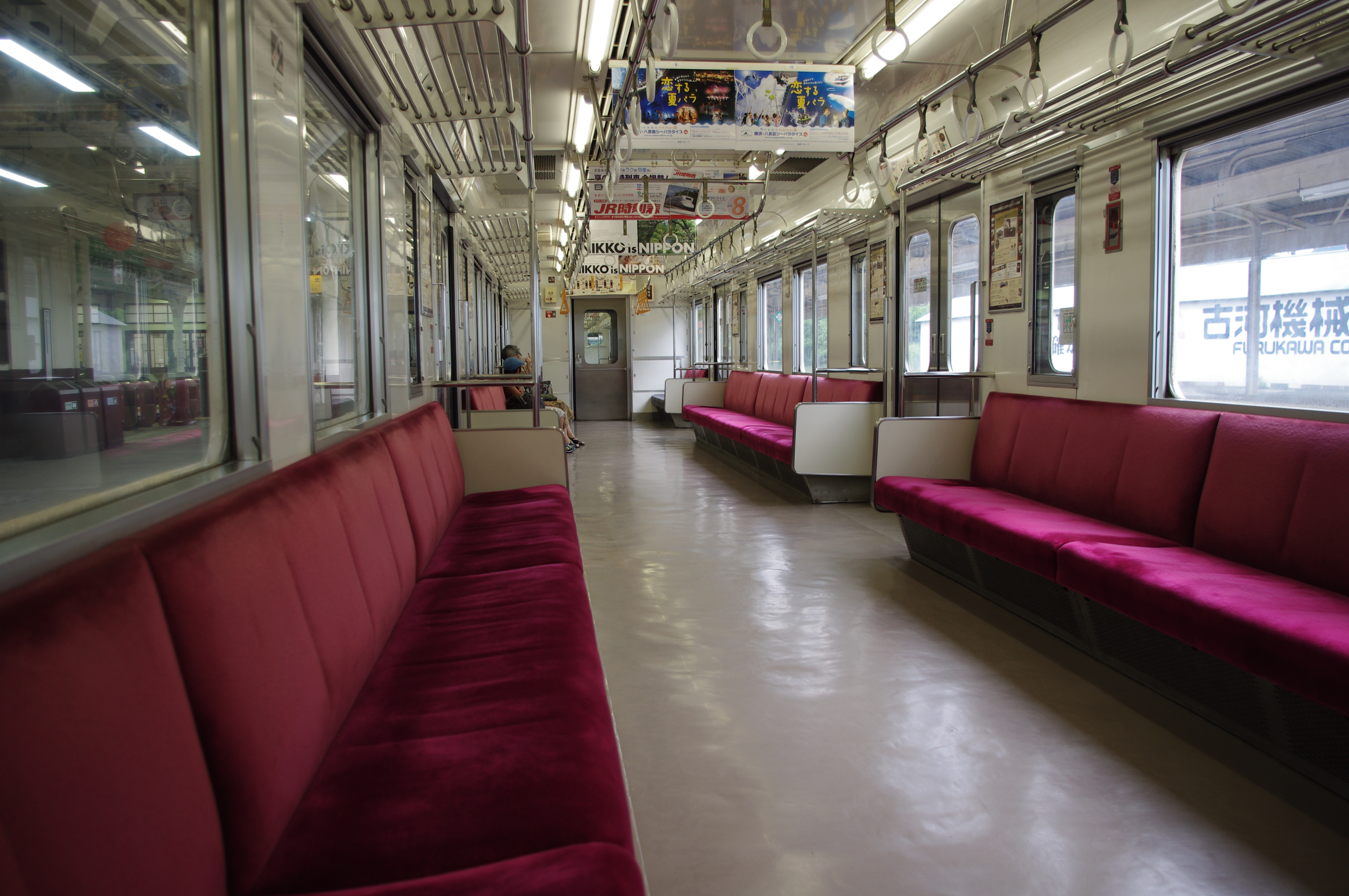
Interior view in July 2010

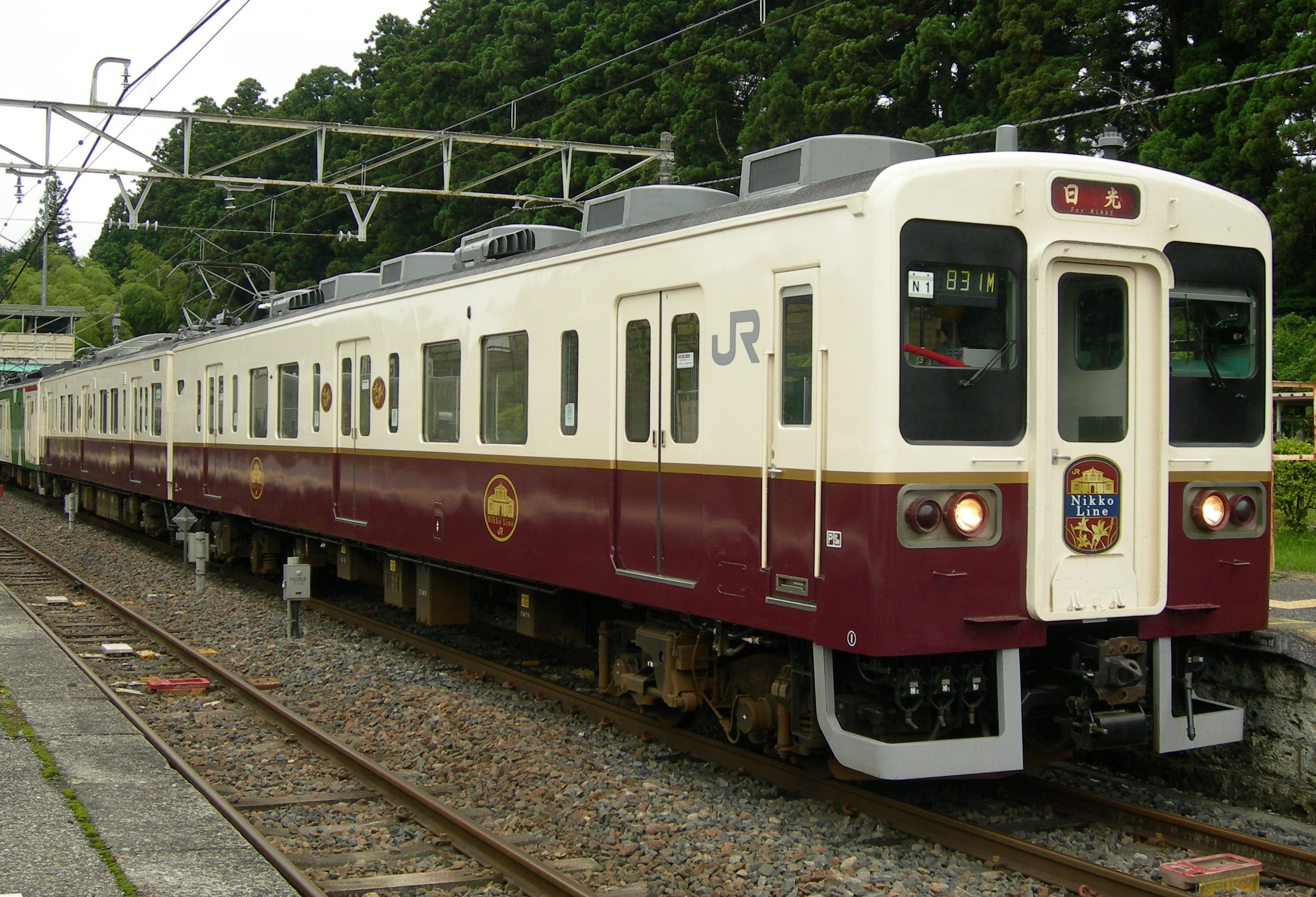
107-0 series set N1 in revised Nikko Line livery in June 2009

=== Formation ===
The two-car 107-0 series trainsets, N1 to N8, were formed as follows with one motored car.

Designation	Mc	Tc'
Numbering	KuMoHa 107	KuHa 106

- The KuMoHa 107 car had two lozenge-type pantographs.
- The KuHa 106 car had a toilet.

=== Fleet history ===
The build details and fleet histories for the eight 107-0 series sets are as follows.

Set No.	Factory	Date delivered	Date withdrawn
N1	Ofuna	16 May 1988	5 June 2013
N2	Omiya	19 May 1988	5 June 2013
N3	Oi	1 July 1988	29 June 2013
N4	Ofuna	16 August 1988	5 June 2013
N5	Omiya	20 August 1988	29 June 2013
N6	Oi	19 September 1988	29 June 2013
N7	Niitsu	27 October 1988	29 June 2013
N8	Ofuna	30 September 1988	5 June 2013

== 107-100 series ==
Nineteen 2-car sets (R1 to R19) were delivered to Takasaki Depot between November 1988 and February 1991 for use on Ryomo Line, Agatsuma Line, Joetsu Line, and Shinetsu Line local services. The livery is all-over cream with green and pink lining. Sets from R6 onwards have no door pocket windows.

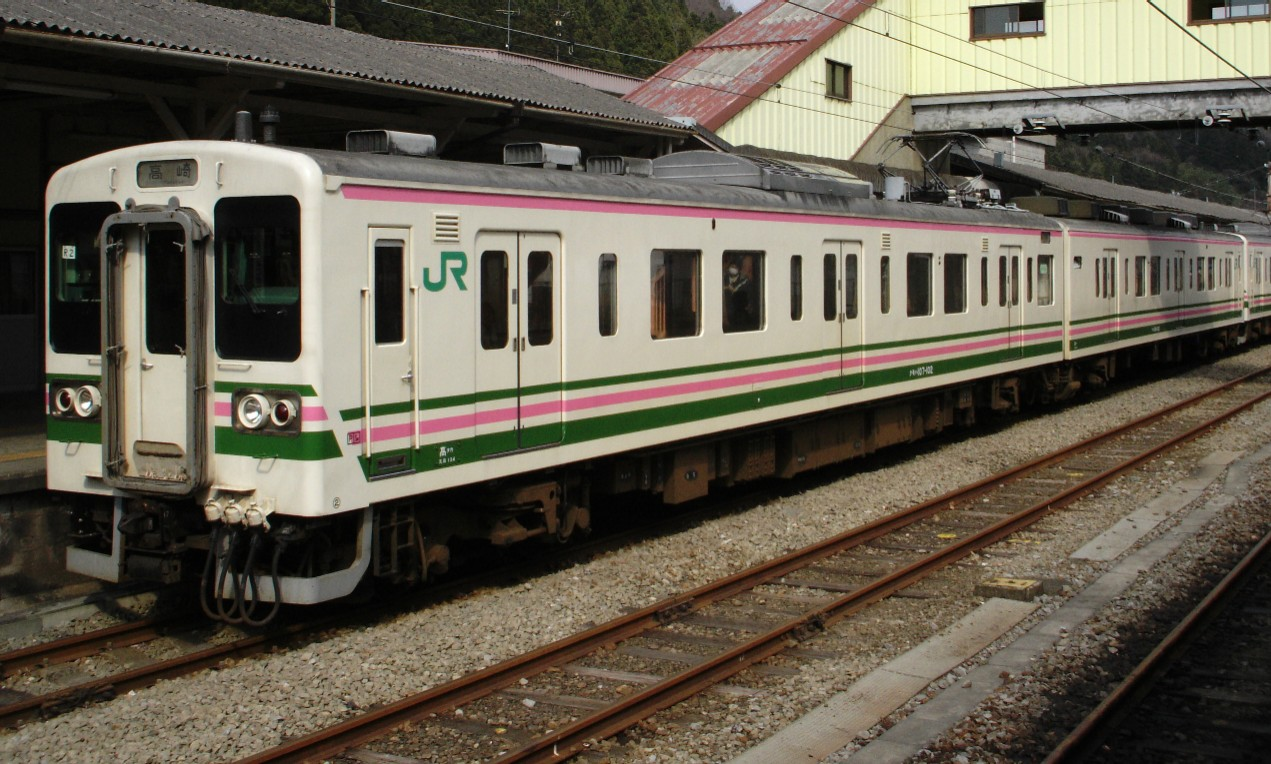
107-100 series set R2 at Yokokawa Station in April 2007

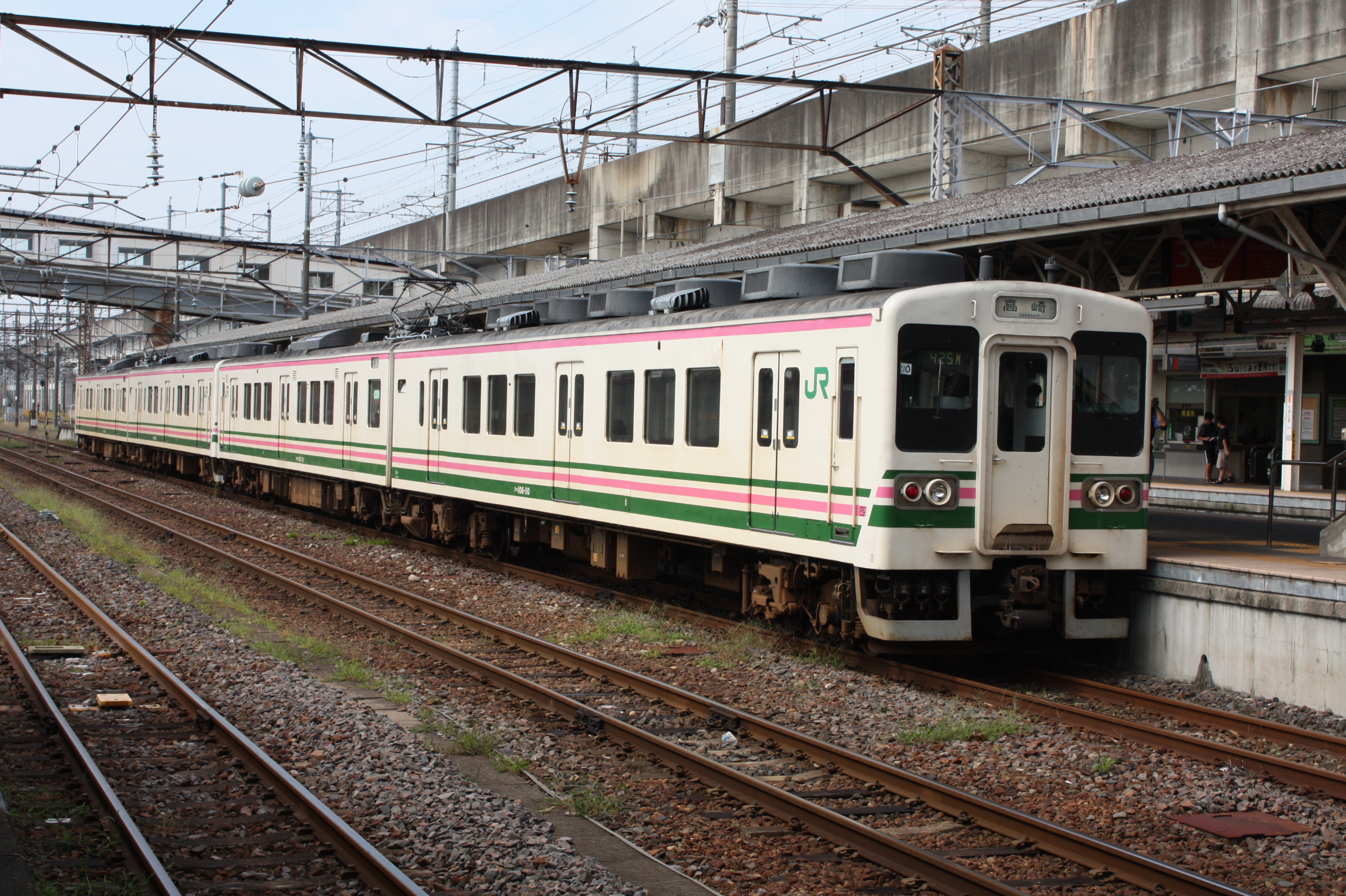
107-100 series set R10 (with no door pocket windows) at Kuroiso Station in August 2009

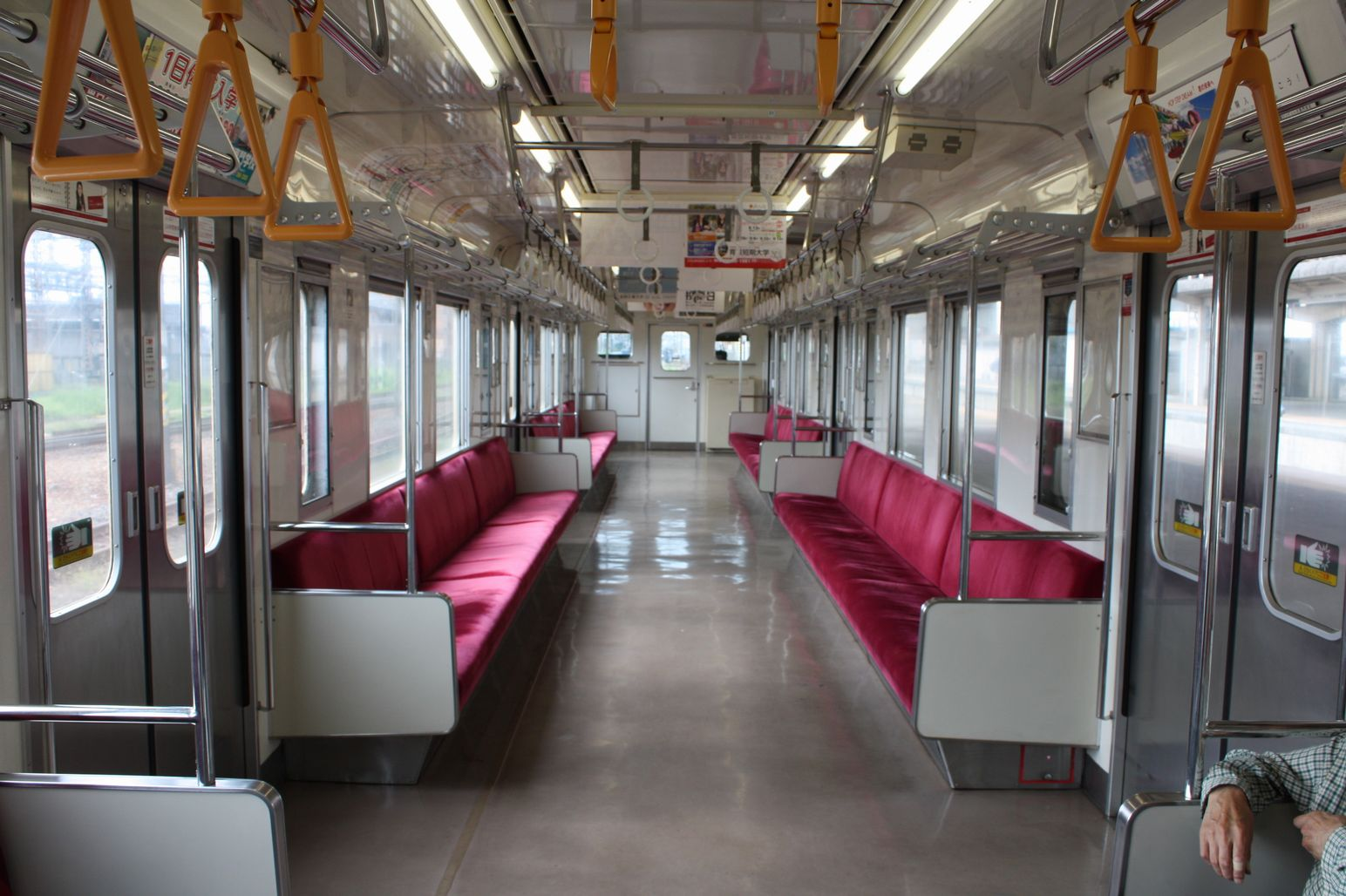
Interior view of a 107-100 series set

=== Formation ===
The two-car 107-100 series trainsets, R1 to R19, are formed as follows with one motored car.

Designation	Mc	Tc'
Numbering	KuMoHa 107-1xx	KuHa 106-1xx

- The KuMoHa 107 car has one lozenge-type pantograph.
- The KuHa 106 car has a toilet.

=== Fleet history ===
The build details and fleet histories for the 19 107-100 series sets are as follows.

Set No.	Factory	Date delivered	Date withdrawn	Remarks
R1	Ofuna	30 November 1988	1 November 2017	
R2	Omiya	30 November 1988	14 July 2016	
R3	Oi	1 February 1989	21 April 2017	
R4	Omiya	28 February 1989	21 April 2017	
R5	Niitsu	23 March 1989	21 April 2017	
R6	Omiya	11 September 1989		
R7	Oi	30 September 1989	3 October 2017	Resold to Joshin Electric Railway
R8	Niitsu	20 October 1989	3 October 2017	Resold to Joshin Electric Railway
R9	Nagano	20 October 1989	21 April 2017	
R10	Omiya	29 November 1989	22 June 2017	
R11	Ofuna	27 December 1989	22 June 2017	
R12	Omiya	28 February 1990	14 July 2016	
R13	Oi	23 February 1990		
R14	Ofuna	29 March 1990		
R15	Koriyama	6 March 1990	12 October 2017	Resold to Joshin Electric Railway
R16	Omiya	10 September 1990	12 October 2017	Resold to Joshin Electric Railway
R17	Oi	12 November 1990	22 June 2017	
R18	Niitsu	26 December 1990	14 July 2016	
R19	Omiya	1 March 1991	14 July 2016	

== Withdrawal and resale ==
=== 107-0 series ===
The Nikko Line 107-0 series fleet was withdrawn and replaced by four refurbished four-car 205 series EMUs from the start of the revised timetable on 16 March 2013.

=== 107-100 series ===
The 107-100 series trainsets were gradually replaced by reformed four-car 211 series EMUs from 2016, and from the start of the 4 March 2017 timetable revision, were removed from use on the Joetsu Line (except for between Takasaki and Shin-Maebashi), Shinetsu main Line, and Agatsuma Line, with one pair of sets remaining in use on the Ryomo Line. By 1 July 2017, eight sets remained on the books, with just two of these, R7 and R8, actually operational. The last remaining sets were withdrawn from service in late September 2017, with a few special runs in early October held to mark their withdrawal; following this, the 107 series was officially withdrawn.

=== Resale ===
Six two-car sets were scheduled to be resold to the Joshin Electric Railway in Gunma Prefecture.

12 vehicles were transferred to the Joshin Electric Railway; the first two-car train entered service on 10 March 2019.

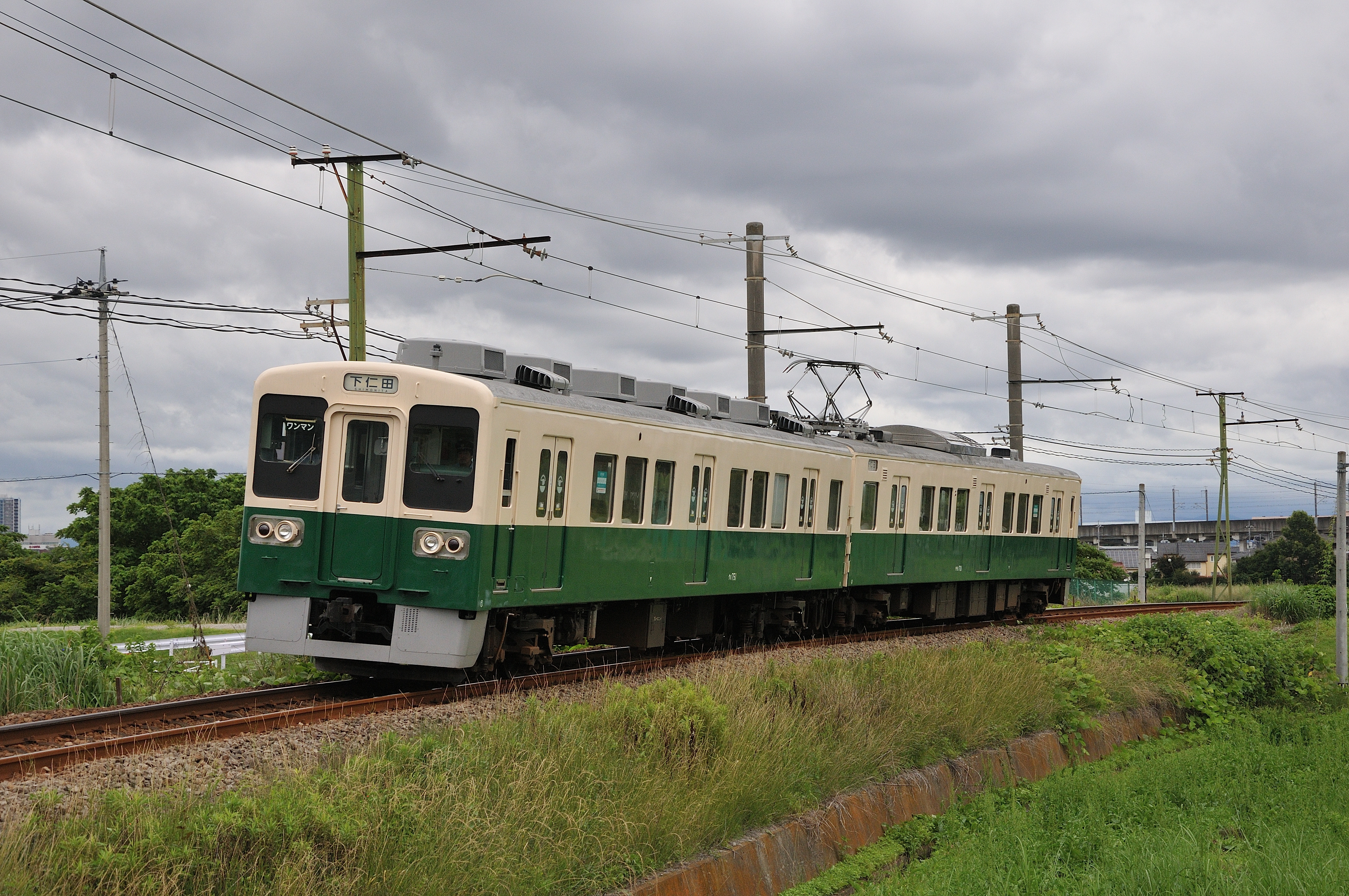
Jōshin Dentetsu 700 series in July 2019
