= 159 series =

Japanese electric multiple unit train type

- In service: 1961–1980
- Manufacturer: Nippon Sharyo
- Constructed: 1961–1962
- Refurbished: 1975
- Number built: 16 cars (3 sets)
- Number in service: None
- Number preserved: None
- Formation: 4/8 cars per set
- Operator: JNR
- Depot: Ogaki

Specifications
- Car body construction: Steel
- Doors: 2 per side
- Electric system: 1,500 V DC
- Track gauge: 1,067 mm (3 ft 6 in)

The 159 series (159系) was an electric multiple unit (EMU) train type operated by Japanese National Railways (JNR) from 1961 until 1980. They were originally designed for and used on school excursion trains running between Tokyo and the Nagoya area via the Tokaido Main Line.

== Exterior ==
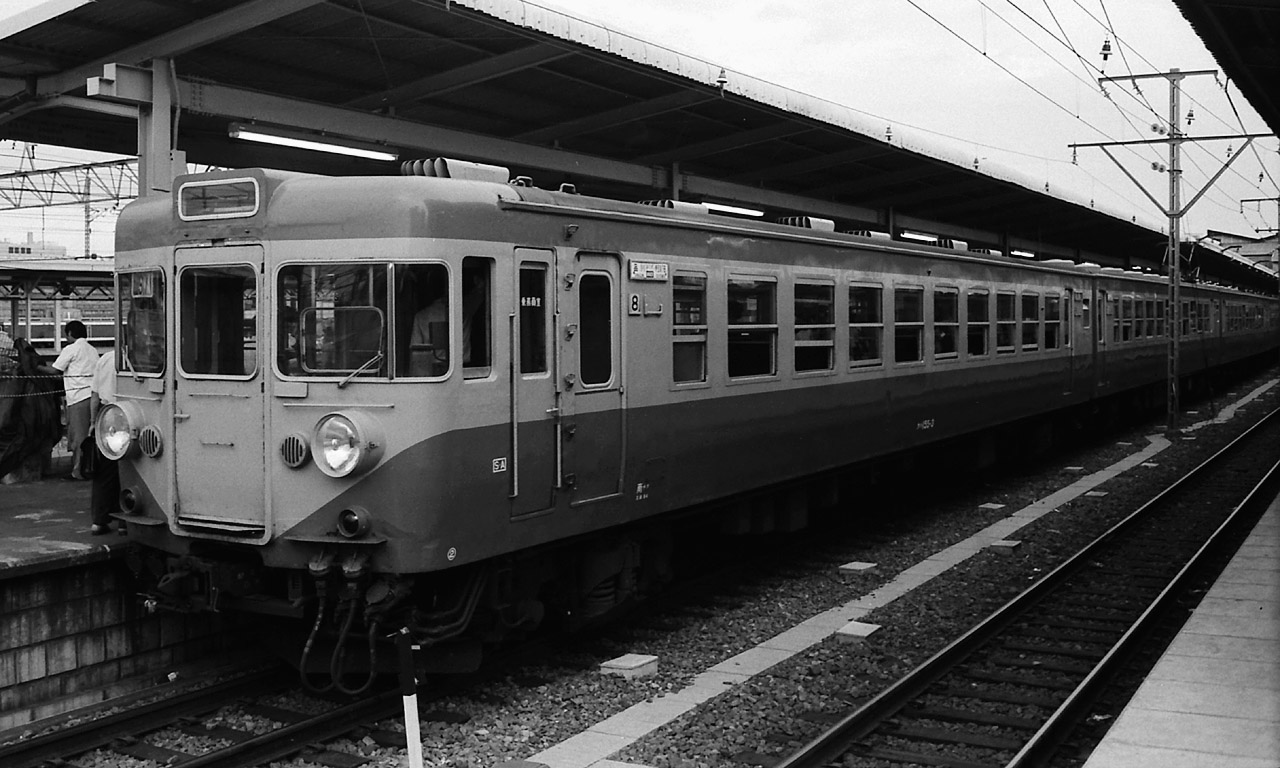
155 series (for comparison)

Broadly based on the earlier 155 series trains, the 159 series trains were also initially painted in the JNR excursion train livery of "lemon yellow" and "light scarlet".

== Formations ==
The fleet consisted of one 8-car and two 4-car sets, formed as shown below, and based at Ogaki Depot in Gifu Prefecture.

=== 8-car set ===
Designation	Tc	M'	M	T	T	M'	M	Tc
Numbering	KuHa 159	MoHa 158	MoHa 159	SaHa 159	SaHa 159	MoHa 158	MoHa 159	KuHa 159

- The MoHa 154 cars were each equipped with one lozenge-type pantograph.

=== 4-car sets ===
Designation	Tc	M'	M	Tc
Numbering	KuHa 159	MoHa 158	MoHa 159	KuHa 159

- The MoHa 158 cars were each equipped with one lozenge-type pantograph.

=== Key ===
- Tc: driving trailer
- T: intermediate trailer
- M: intermediate motor with control equipment
- M': intermediate motor

== History ==
The 159 series sets entered service from 2 April 1961 on Komadori (こまどり) school excursion services running on the Tokaido Main Line between Shinagawa Station in Tokyo and Ogaki Station in Aichi Prefecture. Trains carried headboards on the front with the name of the train. An additional four-car set was delivered in 1962 to allow 16-car formations to be run.

The Komadori school excursion services were discontinued in 1973, and the 159 series were reassigned to use on "rapid" limited-stop services and charter train services, repainted into the Shonan livery of orange and green.

The entire fleet was withdrawn from service by fiscal 1980. No 159 series vehicles have been preserved.

== See also ==
- 155 series
- 167 series
