= Julius of Rome =

Saint Julius of Rome

Martyr
- Born: Rome, Roman Empire
- Died: 190; Rome, Roman Empire
- Venerated in: Roman Catholic Church, Eastern Orthodox Church
- Canonized: Pre-congregation
- Feast: 19 August

Julius of Rome (died AD 190) was an early Roman Christian who was a member of the Roman Senate. He is recorded by Eusebius and Pope Pontian as a martyr.

== Life ==
He was converted to Christianity by Eusebius and was baptized by the priest Rufinus. He subsequently distributed his wealth among the poor. When the emperor Commodus heard of this, he had him arrested and handed him over to the military commander Vitellius, by whom he was imprisoned in a dungeon for three days, after which he was beaten to death. His body was taken and buried by Eusebius and his colleagues on 19 August near the Via Aurelia.
