= NGC 189 =

Open cluster in the constellation Cassiopeia

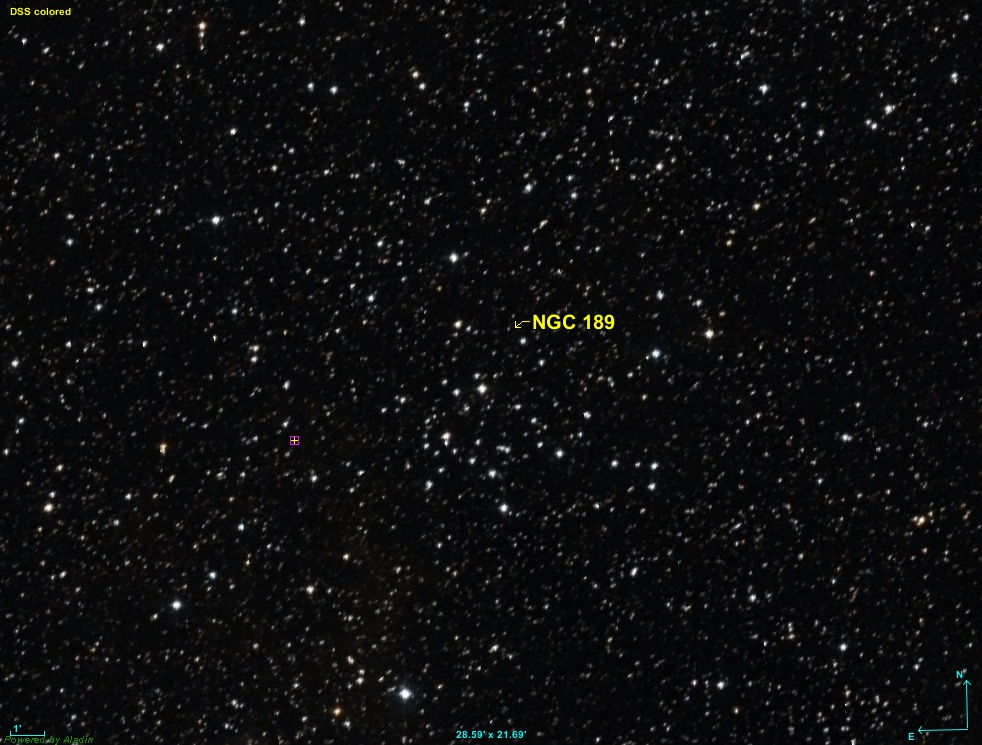
- NGC 189 from DSS

Observation data (J2000 epoch)
- Right ascension: 0^{h} 39^{m} 28.8^{s}
- Declination: +61° 6^{m} 54^{s}
- Distance: 4,200 ly (1,300 pc)
- Apparent magnitude (V): 8.8
- Apparent dimensions (V): 0.120°

Physical characteristics
- Estimated age: 510 Myr
- Other designations: Cr 462, C 0036+608, OCL 301

Associations
- Constellation: Cassiopeia

NGC 189 is an open cluster in the constellation Cassiopeia. It was discovered by Caroline Herschel on 27 September 1783, and independently rediscovered by John Herschel on 27 October 1829.

NGC 189 orbits the Milky Way on a nearly circular orbit with an eccentricity of 0.053 and an orbital period of 231,000 years. It enters the solar circle at parts of its orbit, and is part of the thin disk of the Milky Way.
