= 189th (Canadien-Français) Battalion, CEF =

The 189th Battalion, CEF was a unit in the Canadian Expeditionary Force during the First World War. Based in Fraserville, Quebec, it began recruiting during the winter of 1915/16 in eastern Quebec. After sailing to England in September 1916, the battalion was absorbed into the 69th Overseas Battalion, CEF on October 6, 1916. The 189th Battalion, CEF had one Officer Commanding: Lieut-Col. P. A. Piuze.
