= 159 (telephone number) =

Fraud helpline in the United Kingdom

159 is a UK-wide telephone number used for contact of the caller's respective bank's fraud department. Stop Scams UK and Global Cyber Alliance have launched this service on 28 September 2021. The helpline is compatible with most of Britain's major banks, including Bank of Scotland, First Direct and HSBC.

Calls at 159 will follow a typical national rate, usually part of included minutes in most phone tariffs.

== Background ==
In the first half of 2021, fraud involving bank or police impersonation spiked by 129% in the UK.
