= 153 series =

Japanese electric multiple unit train type

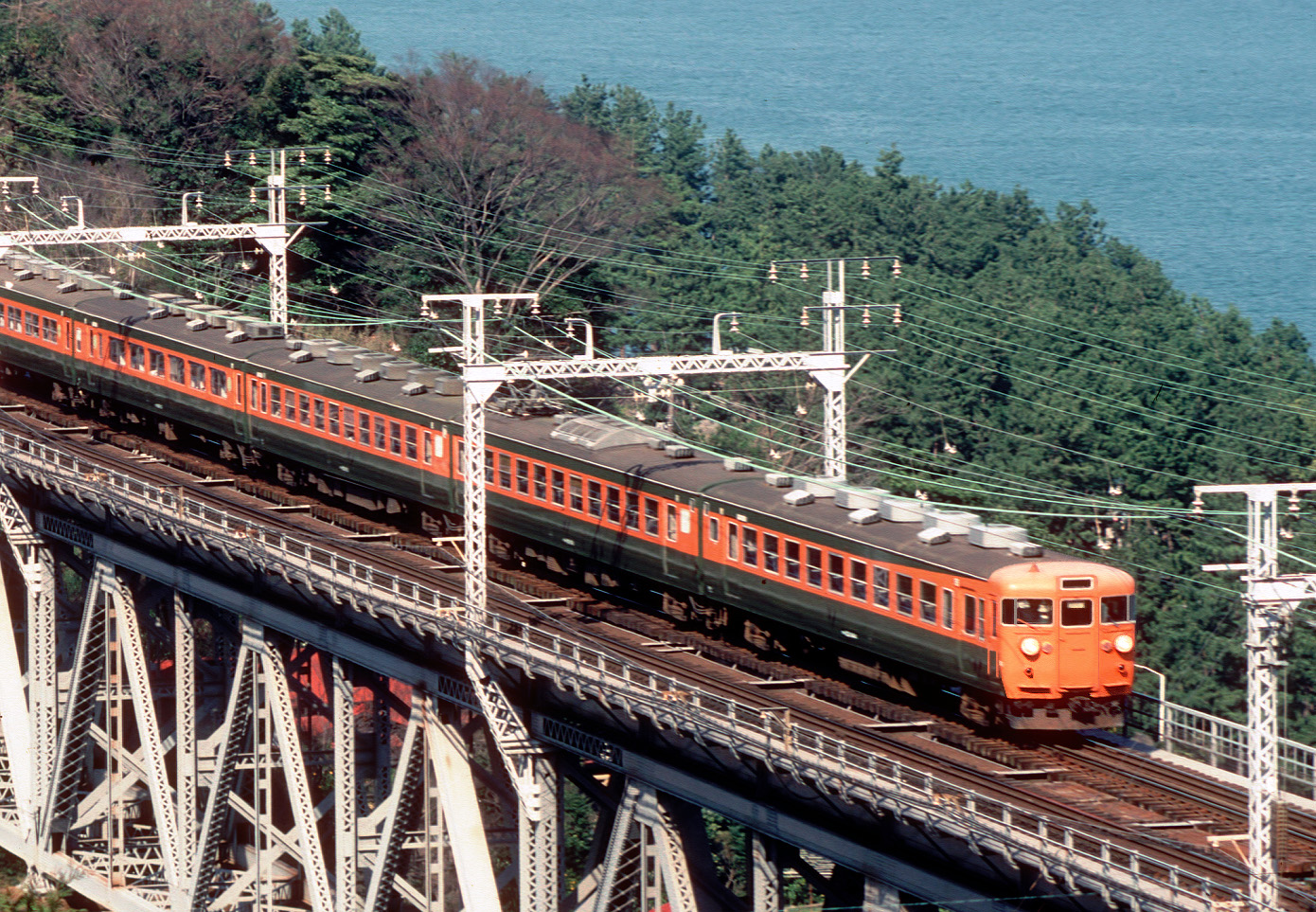
- A JNR 153 series EMU in "Shonan" livery on a Tokaido Main Line Izu service
- In service: 1958-1983
- Manufacturers: Nippon Sharyo, Kisha Seizo, Kinki Sharyo, Kawasaki Heavy Industries
- Replaced: 80 series (Tōkai service)
- Constructed: 1958–1962
- Scrapped: 1981–1987
- Number built: 630 vehicles
- Number in service: None
- Successor: 185 series
- Operator: JNR
- Line served: Tokaido Main Line

Specifications
- Car body construction: Steel
- Car length: 20 m (65 ft 7 in)
- Width: 2,900 mm (9 ft 6 in)
- Doors: 2 per side
- Traction system: Resistor control (CS12 type)
- Traction motors: MT46
- Power output: 100kWx4 per motored car
- Transmission: Hollow Parallel Cardan Drive shaft
- Gear ratio: 4.21 (19:80)
- Electric system: 1,500 V DC
- Current collection: overhead catenary
- Safety system: ATS
- Coupling system: Shibata-type
- Track gauge: 1,067 mm (3 ft 6 in)

The 153 series (153系, 153-kei) was an electric multiple unit (EMU) train type operated by Japanese National Railways (JNR) from 1958 until 1983.

== Interior ==
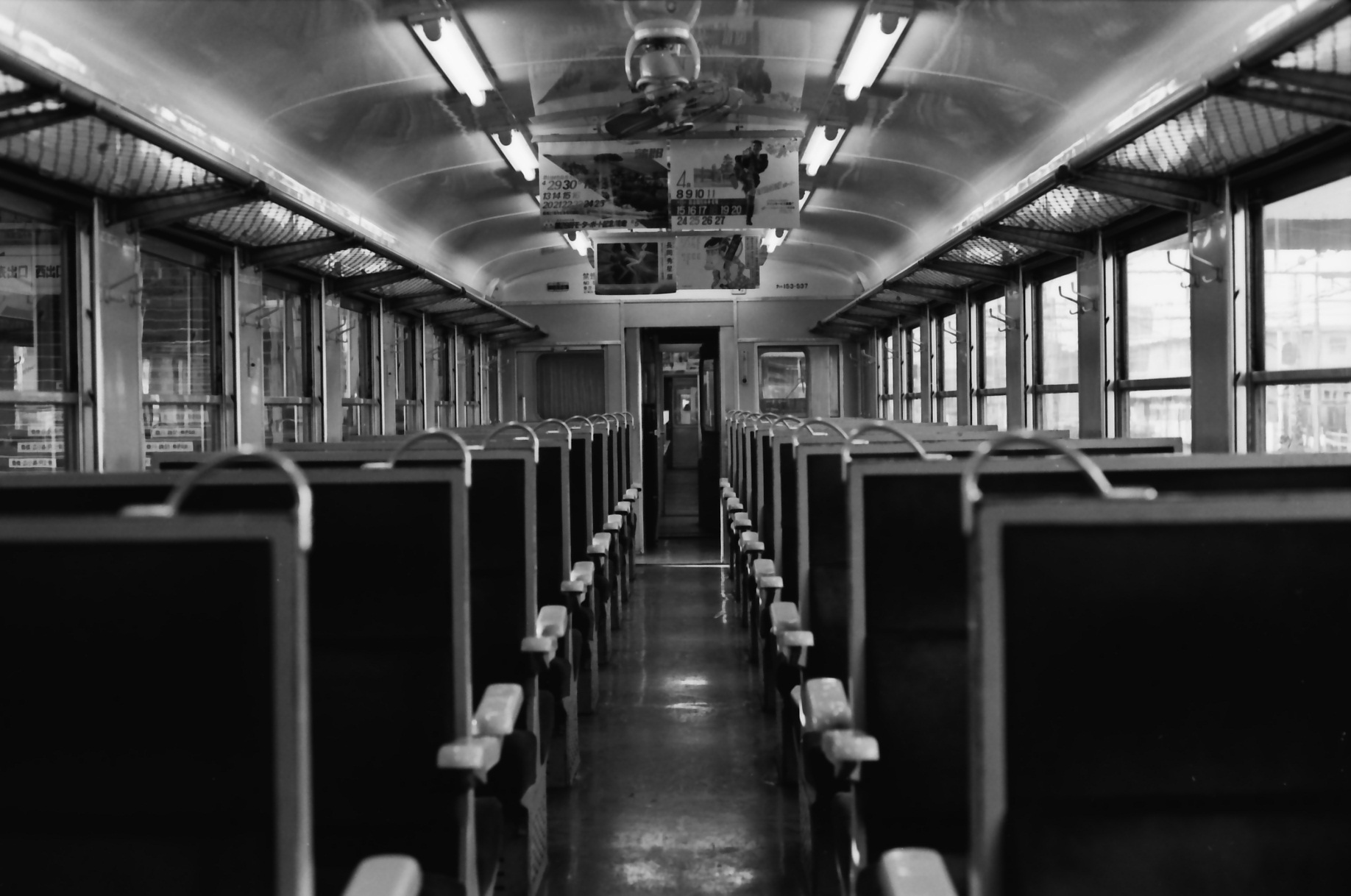
Interior of a non-air-conditioned 153 series car

== History ==
The first trains, initially classified 91 series (91系, 91-kei), entered revenue service on 1 November 1958 on Hiei semi express services operating on the Tokaido Main Line between Tokyo and Nagoya. They were renumbered into the JNR three-digit classification system from 1 June 1959.

From 1972, 153 series sets were introduced on Special Rapid services in the Kyoto-Osaka-Kobe area to compete against private railway operators. These were replaced by 117 series EMUs by the end of 1980.

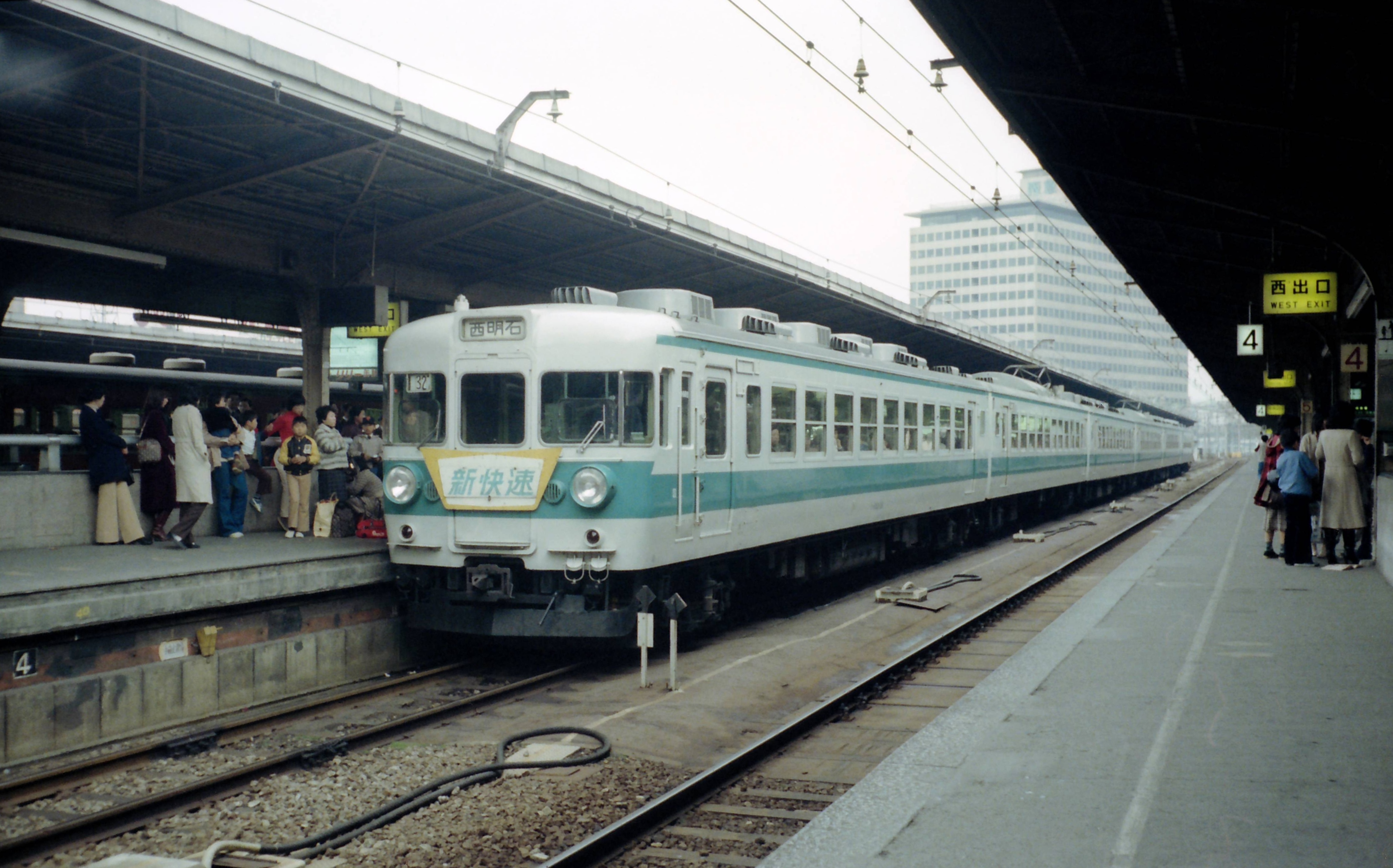
A 153 series set on a Special Rapid service in 1978

The last sets remained in service on Tokaido Main Line Hiei and Tokai services until March 1983.

== See also ==
- 155 series
