= Flight 152 =

Flight 152 may refer to:

- Air France Flight 152, crashed on 3 August 1953
- Garuda Indonesia Flight 152, crashed on 26 September 1997
