= Lectionary 159 =

Lectionary ℓ 159
- New Testament manuscript
- Text: Evangelistarion
- Date: 1061
- Script: Greek
- Now at: Jerusalem
- Size: 27.6 by 21.5 cm

Lectionary 159, designated by siglum ℓ 159 (in the Gregory-Aland numbering) is a Greek manuscript of the New Testament, on parchment leaves. Dated by a colophon to the year 1061.

== Description ==
The codex contains weekday Gospel lessons from Easter to Pentecost and Saturday/Sunday Gospel lessons for the other weeks lectionary. It is written in Greek minuscule letters, on 267 parchment leaves (27.6 by 21.5 cm), in two columns per page, 19 lines per page. It contains music notes and oriental pictures; peculiarly bound.

== History ==
The manuscript was written by John. Formerly it was held in the monastery of Gerasimus near of Jericho.

The manuscript is sporadically cited in the critical editions of the Greek New Testament (UBS3).

Currently the codex is located in the Greek Orthodox Patriarchate (Panagias s. n.) at Jerusalem.

== See also ==
- List of New Testament lectionaries
- Biblical manuscript
- Textual criticism
