= Radical 157 =

Chinese character radical

足
- Radical 157 (U+2F9C)
- 足 (U+8DB3) "foot"

Pronunciations
- Pinyin: zú
- Bopomofo: ㄗㄨˊ
- Wade–Giles: tsu2
- Cantonese Yale: juk1
- Jyutping: zuk1, zeoi3
- Japanese Kana: ショク shoku / ソク soku (on'yomi) あし ashi / たる taru (kun'yomi)
- Sino-Korean: 족 jok
- Hán-Việt: túc

Names
- Chinese name(s): (Left) 足字旁 zúzìpáng (Bottom) 足字底 zúzìdǐ
- Japanese name(s): 足/あし ashi (Left) 足偏/あしへん ashihen
- Hangul: 발 bal

Stroke order animation

Radical 157 or radical foot (足部) meaning "foot" is one of the 20 Kangxi radicals (214 radicals in total) composed of 7 strokes.

In the Kangxi Dictionary, there are 580 characters (out of 49,030) to be found under this radical.

足 is also the 158th indexing component in the Table of Indexing Chinese Character Components predominantly adopted by Simplified Chinese dictionaries published in mainland China.

== Evolution ==
Similar to 疋

Shang dynasty Oracle bone script

Bronze script character

Small seal script character

== Derived characters ==
Strokes	Characters
+0	足
+2	趴
+3	趵 趶 趷 趸^{SC} (=躉)
+4	趹 趺 趻 趽 趾 趿 跀 跁 跂 跃^{SC} (=躍) 跄^{SC} (=蹌)
+5	跅 跆 跇 跈 跉 跊 跋 跌 跍 跎 跏 跐 跑 跒 跓 跔 跕 跖 跗 跘 跙 跚 跛 跜 距 跞^{SC} (=躒) 践^{SC} (=踐)
+6	践^{JP} (=踐) 趼 跟 跠 跡 跢 跣 跤 跥 (=跺) 跦 跧 跨 跩 跪 跫 跬 跭 跮 路 跰 跱 跲 跳 跴 跶^{SC} (=躂) 跷^{SC} (=蹺) 跸^{SC} (=蹕) 跹^{SC} (=躚) 跺 跻^{SC} (=躋)
+7	跼 跽 跾 跿 踀 踁 (=脛 -> 肉) 踂 踃 踄 踅 踆 踇 踈^{JP} (=疏 -> 疋) 踉 踊^{SC} (=踴) 踋 踌^{SC} (=躊) 踍 踎
+8	踏 踐 踑 踒 踓 踔 踕 踖 踗 踘 (=鞠 -> 革) 踙 踚 踛 踜 踝 踞 踟 踠 踡 踢 踣 踤 踥 踦 踧 踨 踩 踪^{SC/JP} (=蹤) 踬^{SC} (=躓) 踭 踮 踯^{SC} (=躑) 踺
+9	踫 (=碰 -> 石) 踰 (=逾 -> 辵 / 窬 -> 穴) 踱 踲 踳 踴 踵 踶 踷 踸 踹 踻 踼 踽 踾 踿 蹀 蹁 蹂 蹃 蹄 蹅
+10	蹆 蹇 蹈 蹉 蹊 蹋 蹌 蹍 蹎 蹏 (=蹄) 蹐 蹑^{SC} (=躡) 蹒^{SC} (=蹣) 蹓
+11	蹔 (=暫 -> 日) 蹕 蹖 蹗 蹘 蹙 蹚 蹛 蹜 蹝 蹞 (=跬) 蹟 (=跡) 蹠 (=跖) 蹡 蹢 蹣 蹤 蹥 蹦 蹧 (=糟 -> 米) 蹮 躀
+12	蹨 蹩 蹪 蹫 蹬 蹭 蹯 蹰^{SC} (=躕) 蹱 蹲 蹳 蹴 蹵 (=蹴) 蹶 蹷 蹸 蹹 蹺 蹻 蹼 蹽 蹾 蹿^{SC} (=躥)
+13	躁 躂 躃 躄 躅 躆 躇 躈 躉
+14	躊 躋 躌 (=䟼) 躍 躎 躏^{SC} (=躪)
+15	躐 躑 躒 躓 躔 躕 躖
+16	躗 躘 躙 躚 躛 躜^{SC} (=躦)
+17	躝 躞 躟 躠
+18	躡 躢 躣 躤 躥
+19	躦 躧
+20	躩 躪
+21	躨

== Sinogram ==
The radical is also used as an independent Chinese character. It is one of the kyōiku kanji or kanji taught in elementary school in Japan. It is a first grade kanji.

== Literature ==
- Fazzioli, Edoardo (1987). Chinese calligraphy : from pictograph to ideogram : the history of 214 essential Chinese/Japanese characters. calligraphy by Rebecca Hon Ko. New York: Abbeville Press. ISBN 0-89659-774-1.
