= NGC 157 =

Galaxy in the constellation Cetus

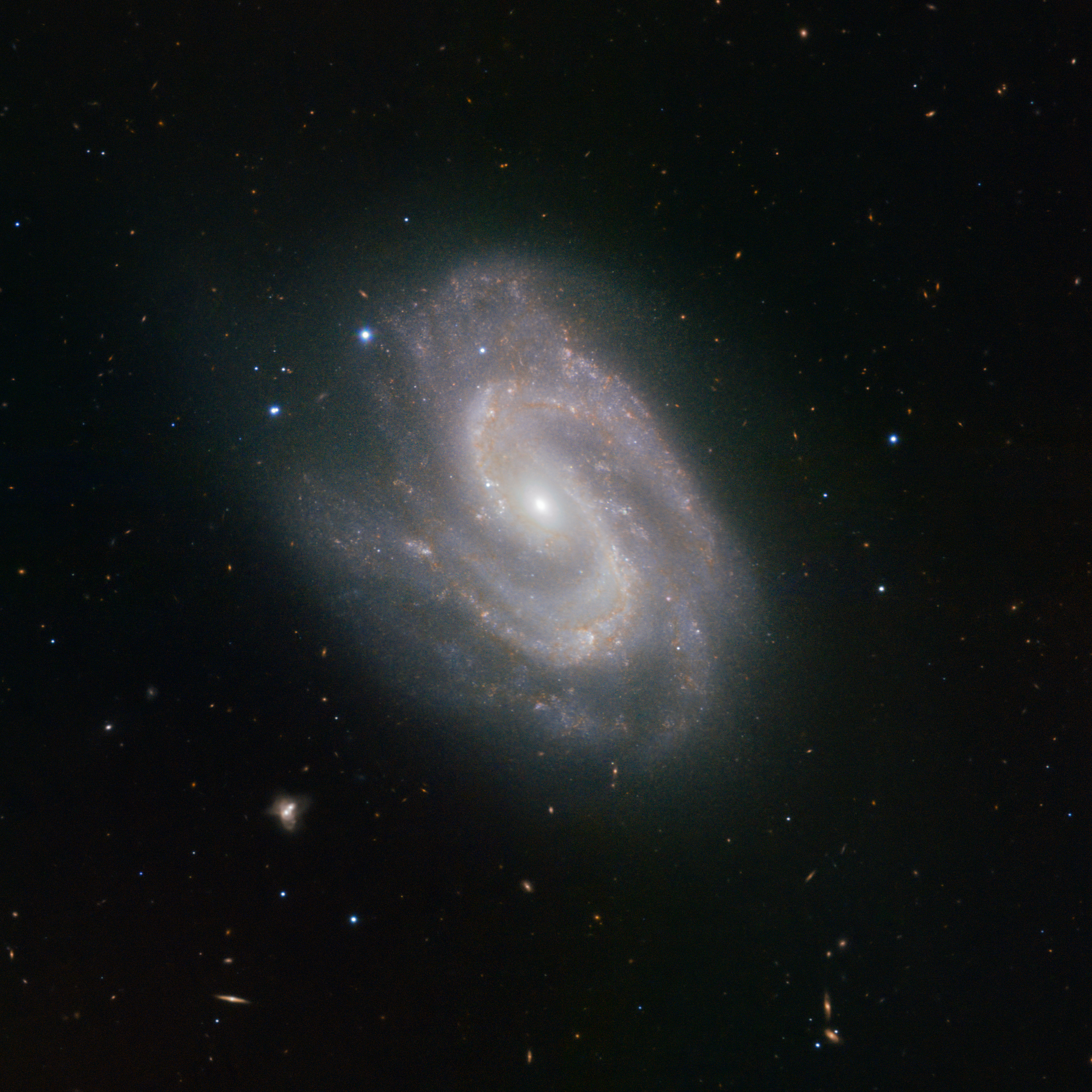
- VLT image of NGC 157

Observation data (J2000 epoch)
- Constellation: Cetus
- Right ascension: 00^{h} 34^{m} 46.751^{s}
- Declination: −08° 23′ 47.36″
- Redshift: 0.0055
- Heliocentric radial velocity: 1651 km/s
- Distance: 39.4 Mly (12.1 Mpc); 75 Mly (23 Mpc)
- Apparent magnitude (V): 10.4
- Apparent magnitude (B): 11.07

Characteristics
- Type: SAB(rs)bc
- Size: 90 kly
- Apparent size (V): 4.0′ × 2.4′

Other designations
- MCG -02-02-056, PGC 2081, 2MASSX J00344675-0823473

NGC 157 is an intermediate spiral galaxy in the constellation of Cetus, positioned about 4° east of the star Iota Ceti. This galaxy can be viewed from suburban skies using a moderate-sized telescope. It was discovered on December 13, 1783 by William Herschel. The compiler of the New General Catalogue, John Louis Emil Dreyer noted that NGC 157 was "pretty bright, large, extended, between 2 considerably bright stars". It is a relatively isolated galaxy; the nearest other galaxy of comparable luminosity lies at a separation of 4.2 Mly (1.3 Mpc).

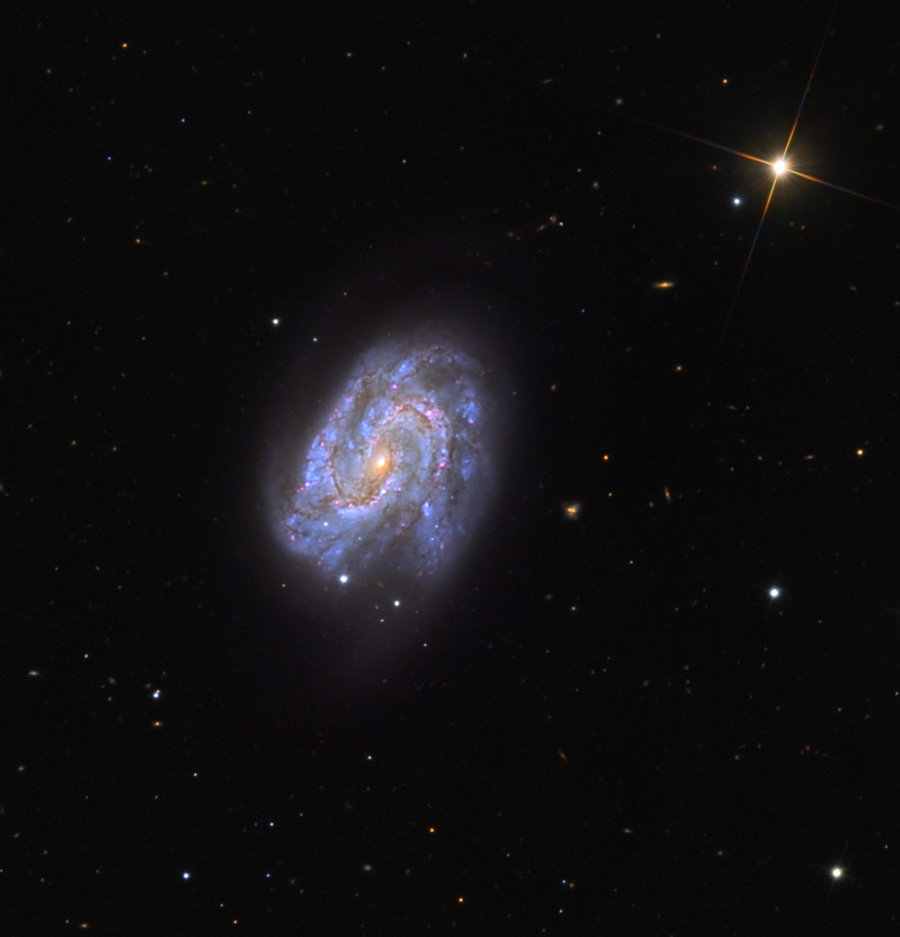
NGC 157 from the Mount Lemmon SkyCenter using the 0.8m Schulman Telescope

The morphological classification of NGC 157 is SAB(rs)bc, indicating this is a weakly-barred spiral galaxy (SAB) with a transitional ring structure (rs) and moderate to loosely-wound arms (bc). The plane of the galaxy is inclined at an angle of 61.8° to the line of sight from the Earth. It has symmetric arms that become flocculent in the outer parts, breaking into multiple arms. The rotation curve for this galaxy undergoes a sharp decline, suggesting a low mass or a small dark matter halo. It is considered a quiescent galaxy, showing little star formation activity. However, there is a starburst region in the nucleus forming new stars at the rate of about one solar mass per year.

== Supernovae ==
This galaxy has been host to two observed supernova events.

- SN 2009em (Type Ic, mag. 16.6) was discovered by Berto Monard on 5 May 2009, about 34″ west and 10″ south of the galaxy core.
- SN 2022jli (Type Ic, mag. 14.4) was discovered by Berto Monard on 5 May 2022.
