= 189th =

189th may refer to:

- 189th (Canadien-Français) Battalion, CEF, a unit in the Canadian Expeditionary Force during the First World War
- 189th Airlift Squadron, a unit of the Idaho Air National Guard that flies the C-130 Hercules
- 189th Airlift Wing, an airlift unit located at Little Rock AFB, Arkansas
- 189th Infantry Brigade (United States)
- 189th (2nd York and Durham) Brigade, a formation of the British Army during the First World War

== See also ==
- 189 (number)
- AD 189, the year 123 (CLXXXIX) of the Julian calendar
