= Battle of Chang'an =

Sack of Han capital Chang'an (192)

- Part of the wars at the end of the Han dynasty
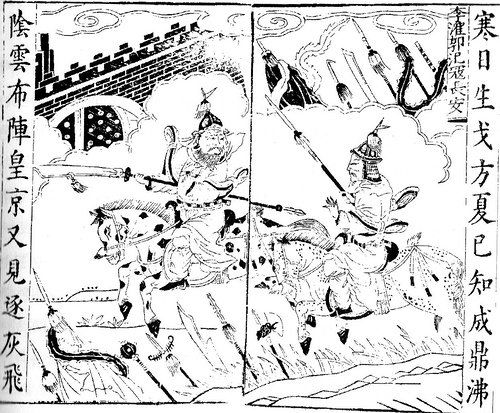
- After Dong Zhuo's death, Li Jue and Guo Si sacked the Han capital at Chang'an. This is a Qing dynasty illustration depicting the attack.
Date	28 June 192 CE
Location	Chang'an (near modern Xi'an)
Result	Li Jue/Guo Si victory

Belligerents
Li Jue/Guo Si forces (Dong Zhuo loyalists)	Wang Yun forces (Dong Zhuo's killers)

Commanders and leaders
Li Jue; Guo Si; Jia Xu	Wang Yun (executed); Lü Bu

The Battle of Chang'an, also known as the Sack of Chang'an, took place in the western Chinese imperial capital city of Chang'an on 28 June 192, at the end of the Han dynasty, the prelude of the Three Kingdoms.

== Background ==
After the Massacre of the Eunuchs (September 189), general and warlord Dong Zhuo had seized control over the imperial court in Luoyang, forcing Emperor Shao to abdicate in favour of Emperor Xian and appropriating the position of Prime Minister for himself, ruling with an iron fist. A coalition of rest warlords launched the Campaign against Dong Zhuo (190–191), which had the effect of Dong burning down Luoyang, abducting the emperor and relocating the imperial court to Chang'an. The coalition was unable to pursue them and fell apart due to internal conflict, with many warlords returning home to start their own quests to take over the empire, whose central authority had almost disappeared.

In early 192, Dong Zhuo's loyal general Niu Fu ordered officers Li Jue and Guo Si to attack general Zhu Jun, after which they raided Yingchuan and Chenliu. Meanwhile, Excellency over the Masses Wang Yun persuaded officers Lü Bu (Dong Zhuo's adopted son and personal bodyguard) and Li Su to join his plot to assassinate Dong Zhuo, which was successfully carried out on 22 May 192, with Lü Bu striking the lethal blow. Wang Yun then took control of the government as regent, and set about eliminating all remaining Dong Zhuo loyalists. When Li Su failed to defeat Niu Fu, however, Lü Bu had their co-conspirator executed.

== Battle ==
By the time Li Jue, Guo Si and their colleagues returned to Chang'an, Niu Fu had been killed by his own troops. Li Jue and Guo Si offered their submission to Wang Yun, but requested amnesty for their past actions, as they feared execution for their part in Dong Zhuo's regime. However, when the new regent refused, they took the advice of Jia Xu and decided to storm the capital to seize control of the imperial government and save themselves. In the Battle of Chang'an on 28 June 192, Li Jue and Guo Si drove Lü Bu to flight, killed officials and civilians, and captured Wang Yun, who was executed a few days later.

== Aftermath ==
Lü Bu fled east to offer his service to Yuan Shu; his Chang'an regime with Wang Yun had lasted just 37 days. Li Jue and Guo Si would end up fighting each other for years for control of what was left of the imperial government, further devastating the city, until the emperor managed to escape east in 195. Warlord Cao Cao took the emperor, who had returned to Luoyang in August 196, into his protection/custody in the autumn of 196, moving the capital to Xu city, the base of Cao.
