= Zhang Ji (Han dynasty) =

Chinese Han dynasty general (died 196)

- 張濟

General of Agile Cavalry (驃騎將軍)
- In office 195 – 196
- Monarch: Emperor Xian of Han

General Who Guards the East (鎮東將軍)
- In office 192 – 195
- Monarch: Emperor Xian of Han

Personal details
- Born: Unknown; Jingyuan County, Gansu
- Died: 196; Dengzhou, Henan
- Spouse: at least one wife
- Relatives: Zhang Xiu (nephew)
- Occupation: General
- Peerage: Marquis of Pingyang (平陽侯)

Zhang Ji (died 196) was a military general serving under the warlord Dong Zhuo during the late Eastern Han dynasty of China.

== Life ==
Zhang Ji was from Zuli County (祖厲縣), Wuwei Commandery (武威郡), which is in present-day Jingyuan County, Gansu. He started his career as a subordinate of Niu Fu, a son-in-law of the warlord Dong Zhuo, who controlled the Han central government and the figurehead Emperor Xian from 189 to 192. In 192, Niu Fu ordered Zhang Ji to join Li Jue and Guo Si in leading troops to attack the general Zhu Jun at Zhongmu County (中牟縣) and pillage Chenliu (陳留) and Yingchuan (潁川) commanderies.

After Dong Zhuo was assassinated in Chang'an in 192, Li Jue, Guo Si, Zhang Ji and other former followers of Dong Zhuo requested amnesty from Wang Yun, who replaced Dong Zhuo as the new head of the central government. However, Wang Yun refused and wanted to have all of them executed. Heeding Jia Xu's advice, Li Jue, Guo Si, Zhang Ji and Dong Zhuo's former followers led their troops to attack Chang'an and succeeded in driving away Lü Bu and seizing control of the central government. Zhang Ji was then appointed as General Who Guards the East (鎮東將軍) and ordered to station at a military garrison in Hongnong Commandery (弘農郡). He was also enfeoffed as the Marquis of Pingyang (平陽侯).

In 195, when internal conflict broke out between Li Jue and Guo Si in Chang'an, Zhang Ji succeeded in mediating the conflict and persuading both sides to make peace. Zhang Ji also suggested letting Emperor Xian leave Chang'an and return to the old imperial capital, Luoyang. Emperor Xian then promoted Zhang Ji to General of Agile Cavalry (驃騎將軍). However, Zhang Ji later had disagreements with the generals Yang Feng and Dong Cheng, who were escorting Emperor Xian back to Luoyang, so he allied with Li Jue and Guo Si to attack Yang Feng and Dong Cheng in an attempt to capture Emperor Xian and bring him back to Chang'an. However, the emperor had already escaped and taken shelter under the warlord Zhang Yang.

In 196, Zhang Ji led his troops out of the Guanzhong region and moved to Nanyang Commandery (南陽郡) in northern Jing Province. He then attempted to conquer Rang County (穰縣; present-day Dengzhou, Henan), but was killed by a stray arrow in the midst of battle.

Zhang Ji's nephew, Zhang Xiu, made peace with Liu Biao, the Governor of Jing Province, who allowed him to stay at Wan County (宛縣; or Wancheng 宛城; present-day Wancheng District, Nanyang, Henan). Zhang Xiu became a minor warlord in his own right. Zhang Ji's widow, who is called Lady Zou (鄒氏) in the 14th-century historical novel Romance of the Three Kingdoms, was taken by the warlord Cao Cao as a concubine.

== See also ==
- Lists of people of the Three Kingdoms
