= Jia Xu =

Cao Wei politician and official (147-223)

- 賈詡
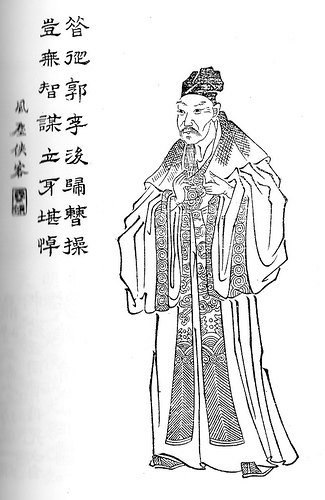
- A Qing dynasty illustration of Jia Xu

Grand Commandant (太尉)
- In office 6 April 220 – August 11, 223
- Monarch: Cao Pi

Palace Counsellor (太中大夫)
- In office ? – April 6, 220
- Monarch: Emperor Xian of Han
- Chancellor: Cao Cao / Cao Pi

Bearer of the Mace (執金吾) (under Cao Cao)
- In office 199 – ?
- Monarch: Emperor Xian of Han

General Who Upholds Righteousness (宣義將軍) (under Li Jue)
- In office 195 – 196
- Monarch: Emperor Xian of Han

Household Counsellor (光祿大夫) (under Li Jue)
- In office ? – 195
- Monarch: Emperor Xian of Han

Master of Writing (尚書) (under Li Jue)
- In office ?–?
- Monarch: Emperor Xian of Han

Left Adjunct (左馮翊) (under Li Jue)
- In office 192 – ?
- Monarch: Emperor Xian of Han

Colonel Who Attacks Barbarians (討虜校尉)
- In office 189 – 192
- Monarch: Emperor Xian of Han
- Chancellor: Dong Zhuo

Commandant of Pingjin (平津都尉)
- In office ? – 189
- Monarch: Emperor Xian of Han
- Chancellor: Dong Zhuo

Personal details
- Born: 147 (Note: Cao Pi's biography in the Sanguozhi stated that Jia Xu died on the jiashen day in the 6th month of the 4th year of the Huangchu era of Cao Pi's reign. (Note: ([黃初四年夏六月]甲申，太尉賈詡薨。) Sanguozhi vol. 2.) This date corresponds to 11 August 223 in the Gregorian calendar. Jia Xu's biography also mentioned that he was 77 years old (by East Asian age reckoning) when he died. (Note: (詡年七十七，薨， ...) Sanguozhi vol. 10.) By calculation, Jia Xu's birth year should be 147.) Wuwei, Gansu
- Died: 11 August 223 (aged 76)
- Children: Jia Mu; Jia Ji; Jia Fang
- Parent: Jia Gong (father)
- Occupation: Official, adviser, writer
- Courtesy name: Wenhe (文和)
- Posthumous name: Marquis Su (肅侯)
- Peerage: Marquis of Weishou District (魏壽鄉侯)

Jia Xu (147 – 11 August 223), courtesy name Wenhe, was a Grand Commandant of the state of Cao Wei during the early Three Kingdoms period of China.

A native of Gansu. (Note: (賈詡字文和，武威姑臧人也。少時人莫知，唯漢陽閻忠異之，謂詡有良、平之奇。) Sanguozhi vol. 10.) He started his career in the late Eastern Han dynasty as a minor official. In 189, when the warlord Dong Zhuo took control of the Han central government, he assigned Jia Xu to the unit led by Niu Fu, his son-in-law. In May 192, after Dong Zhuo was assassinated by Lü Bu, Jia Xu advised Li Jue, Guo Si and Dong Zhuo's loyalists to fight back and seize control of the imperial capital, Chang'an, from a new central government headed by Lü Bu and Wang Yun. After Li Jue and the others defeated Lü Bu and occupied Chang'an, Jia Xu served under the central government led by them. During this time, he ensured the safety of the figurehead Han emperor, Emperor Xian, who was being held hostage by Li Jue. He also attempted to prevent internal conflict between Li Jue and Guo Si, but with limited success. After Emperor Xian escaped from Chang'an, Jia Xu left Li Jue and briefly joined the general Duan Wei before becoming a strategist of the warlord Zhang Xiu. While serving under Zhang Xiu, he advised his lord on how to counter invasions by the warlord Cao Cao, who had received Emperor Xian in 196 and taken control of the central government. In 200, during the Battle of Guandu between Cao Cao and his rival Yuan Shao, Jia Xu urged Zhang Xiu to reject Yuan Shao's offer to form an alliance and instead surrender to Cao Cao. Zhang Xiu heeded his advice. Jia Xu then became one of Cao Cao's strategists. While serving other warlords, Jia Xu repeatedly inflicted setbacks on Cao Cao’s forces. After later joining Cao Cao, he was still trusted and heavily employed.

During his service under Cao Cao, Jia Xu made three important contributions. First, during the Battle of Guandu, he urged Cao Cao to switch from being on the defensive to adopting an offensive stance, which ultimately led to Cao Cao's decisive victory over Yuan Shao. Second, during the Battle of Tong Pass in 211, he suggested to Cao Cao to pretend to agree to make peace with the northwestern warlords Han Sui and Ma Chao, and then sow discord between them. Cao Cao heeded his suggestion, successfully stirred up internal conflict among the warlords, and then used the opportunity to defeat them. Thirdly, in the 210s, when Cao Cao's sons Cao Pi and Cao Zhi were fighting to be their father's successor, Jia Xu indirectly helped Cao Pi by giving him advice and hinting to Cao Cao that he should choose the older son to be his heir apparent. After Cao Cao's death in 220, Cao Pi ended the Eastern Han dynasty by forcing Emperor Xian to abdicate the throne to him, and founded the state of Cao Wei with himself as the emperor. As an expression of gratitude to Jia Xu, Cao Pi appointed him as Grand Commandant – one of the top three positions in the Wei government – and promoted him to a district marquis. Between 220 and 223, Jia Xu advised Cao Pi against attacking Cao Wei's rival states, Eastern Wu and Shu Han, and focus on internal development. However, Cao Pi ignored his advice and invaded Wu, but ended up sustaining heavy losses and not making any significant gains. Jia Xu died in 223. The Sanguozhi records that after becoming Grand Commandant, Jia Xu kept his household secluded, avoided private associations with other officials, and did not arrange his children’s marriages with powerful families.

== Early life and career ==
Jia Xu was from Guzang County (姑臧縣), Wuwei Commandery (武威郡), which is in present-day Wuwei, Gansu. In his youth, he was unimpressive and unheard of. However, Yan Zhong (閻忠), an official from Hanyang Commandery (漢陽郡; around present-day Gangu County, Gansu), felt that Jia Xu was extraordinary and even remarked that Jia had the brilliance of Zhang Liang and Chen Ping, two famous strategists of the early Western Han dynasty.

Jia Xu was nominated as a xiaolian to serve in the Eastern Han government as a Gentleman Cadet (郎). However, due to illness, he quit his job and went home. On the way back, he was captured by Di rebels at Qian County (汧縣; in present-day Long County, Shaanxi) along with several other travellers. He told the rebels: "I am a maternal grandson of Lord Duan. If you let me live, my family will reward you handsomely." "Lord Duan" referred to Duan Jiong (段熲), who held the position of Grand Commandant (太尉) in the Han imperial court. As Duan Jiong had served for years as a general guarding the Han Empire's western regions, he was well known among the people living in the area. Jia Xu knew that the Di rebels were afraid of Duan Jiong, so he pretended to be Duan Jiong's maternal grandson. As he expected, the rebels treated him respectfully and released him. The other travellers were all killed. (Note: (察孝廉為郎，疾病去官，西還至汧，道遇叛氐，同行數十人皆為所執。詡曰：「我段公外孫也，汝別埋我，我家必厚贖之。」時太尉段熲，昔乆為邊將，威震西土，故詡假以懼氐。氐果不敢害，與盟而送之，其餘悉死。詡實非段甥，權以濟事，咸此類也。) Sanguozhi vol. 10.)

== Service under Dong Zhuo ==
In 189, the warlord Dong Zhuo entered the imperial capital, Luoyang, and took control of the central government. Jia Xu was then serving as the Commandant (都尉) of Pingjin (平津) and an assistant official in the Grand Commandant's office. He was promoted to Colonel Who Attacks Barbarians (討虜校尉) and assigned to the unit led by Dong Zhuo's son-in-law, Niu Fu. (Note: (董卓之入洛陽，詡以太尉掾為平津都尉，遷討虜校尉。卓壻中郎將牛輔屯陝，詡在輔軍。) Sanguozhi vol. 10.)

In 192, Dong Zhuo was assassinated by Lü Bu in the imperial capital, Chang'an, (Note: Dong Zhuo ordered the destruction of Luoyang in 190 when he came under attack by a coalition of warlords, and moved the imperial capital to Chang'an.) while Niu Fu was murdered by his subordinates. The rest of Dong Zhuo's loyalists, including Li Jue, Guo Si and Zhang Ji, became fearful and wanted to disband and return to their respective home commanderies. Jia Xu told them: "I heard that the new government in Chang'an is planning to exterminate everyone from Liang Province. (Note: Most of Dong Zhuo's loyalists were from Liang Province (涼州; covering roughly present-day Ningxia and Gansu).) If all of you break up and travel alone, even a tingzhang (Note: Tingzhang (亭長) was a low county-level official rank in the Han dynasty.) can arrest you. Why don't you retreat to the west together? There you can gather and reorganise your forces, and then attack Chang'an to avenge Lord Dong. If you succeed, you can make use of imperial authority to conquer the rest of the Empire. If you fail, it's still not too late to escape." Dong Zhuo's loyalists agreed with Jia Xu and did as he suggested. They managed to defeat the new central government in Chang'an led by Lü Bu and Wang Yun, and then took control of the city. (Note: (卓敗，輔又死，衆恐懼，校尉李傕、郭汜、張濟等欲解散，間行歸鄉里。詡曰：「聞長安中議欲盡誅涼州人，而諸君棄衆單行，即一亭長能束君矣。不如率衆而西，所在收兵，以攻長安，為董公報仇，幸而事濟，奉國家以征天下，若不濟，走未後也。」衆以為然。傕乃西攻長安。語在卓傳。) Sanguozhi vol. 10.)

Pei Songzhi, who annotated Jia Xu's biography in the Sanguozhi, strongly criticised Jia Xu for offering this suggestion. He argued that Dong Zhuo's death marked the end of his tyranny and a possible revival of the declining Eastern Han dynasty. However, due to Jia Xu's suggestion, the Han Empire became even more chaotic after Dong Zhuo's death. (Note: (臣松之以為傳稱「仁人之言，其利愽哉」！然則不仁之言，理必反是。夫仁功難著，而亂源易成，是故有禍機一發而殃流百世者矣。當是時，元惡旣梟，天地始開，致使厲階重結，大梗殷流，邦國遘殄悴之哀，黎民嬰周餘之酷，豈不由賈詡片言乎？詡之罪也，一何大哉！自古兆亂，未有如此之甚。) Pei Songzhi's annotation in Sanguozhi vol. 10.)

== Service under Li Jue ==
When Jia Xu later served as Left Adjunct (左馮翊), Li Jue and Dong Zhuo's loyalists wanted to reward him by making him a marquis, but Jia Xu said, "That suggestion I made was meant to save your lives. What merit have I achieved to deserve a reward?" He declined to accept the marquis title. Later on, when he was nominated to serve as a Supervisor of the Masters of Writing (尚書僕射), he said: "The Supervisor of the Masters of Writing is like a tutor to officials. I don't have a strong reputation so I am afraid I might not be able to convince people that I am suited for this appointment. What will become of the imperial court if I accept this appointment for my personal glory?" He was then assigned to be a Master of Writing (尚書) instead, and was tasked with selecting candidates to serve in the government. Li Jue and the others regarded him highly but were also wary of him. (Note: (後詡為左馮翊，傕等欲以功侯之，詡曰：「此救命之計，何功之有！」固辭不受。又以為尚書僕射，詡曰：「尚書僕射，官之師長，天下所望，詡名不素重，非所以服人也。縱詡昧於榮利，柰國朝何！」乃更拜詡尚書，典選舉，多所匡濟，傕等親而憚之。) Sanguozhi vol. 10.) The candidates Jia Xu chose tend to be officials who formerly served in the previous administration. Jia Xu was praised for this mode of selecting government officials by retaining some continuity in appointments. (Note: (魏書曰：詡典選舉，多選舊名以為令僕，論者以此多詡。) Wei Shu annotation in Sanguozhi vol. 10.) When there were tensions between Li Jue, Guo Si and Fan Chou, with their respective subordinates urging them to go to war, Jia Xu reprimanded them for their behaviour and tried to persuade them to avoid conflict. They listened to him. (Note: (獻帝紀曰：郭汜、樊稠與傕互相違戾，欲鬬者數矣。詡輒以道理責之，頗受詡言。) Xiandi Ji annotation in Sanguozhi vol. 10.)

As a Master of Writing, Jia Xu once found out that Consort Tang, widow of Liu Bian, was captured when Li Jue and Guo Si sent their troops to pillage the lands east of Hangu Pass. Li Jue wanted to make Consort Tang his concubine but she refused and never told him that she was a former concubine of an emperor. Jia Xu then informed Emperor Xian. Emperor Xian took pity on her and summoned her to Liu Bian's tomb, where he honoured her by awarding her the title "Princess Consort of Hongnong" (弘農王妃).

When his mother died, Jia Xu resigned and went home for filial mourning. He was given the honorary position of a Household Counsellor (光祿大夫) by the imperial court. In 195, when conflict broke out between Li Jue and Guo Si in Chang'an, Li invited Jia Xu back to serve as General Who Upholds Righteousness (宣義將軍). (Note: (會母喪去官，拜光祿大夫。傕、汜等鬬長安中，傕復請詡為宣義將軍。) Sanguozhi vol. 10.) Li Jue and his men discussed with Jia Xu their plan to bring Emperor Xian to their camp and use the emperor as a hostage to threaten Guo Si, but Jia Xu said: "No, it isn't right to hold the Emperor hostage." Li Jue refused to listen to him and went ahead. Guo Si, on the other hand, kidnapped Emperor Xian's subjects and held them hostage in his own camp. Zhang Xiu told Jia Xu, "You shouldn't stay here any longer. Why don't you leave?" Jia Xu replied, "I have received grace from the Empire, so I won't betray the Empire's trust in me. If you wish to leave, you can go. I won't leave." (Note: (獻帝紀曰：傕等與詡議，迎天子置其營中。詡曰：「不可。脅天子，非義也。」傕不聽。張繡謂詡曰：「此中不可乆處，君胡不去？」詡曰：「吾受國恩，義不可背。卿自行，我不能也。」) Xiandi Ji annotation in Sanguozhi vol. 10.)

Li Jue used material wealth to tempt thousands of Qiang tribesmen to support him in his struggle against Guo Si. He even promised to give palace women as concubines to the tribal chiefs. When the tribesmen showed up at Chang'an, they asked: "Is the Emperor inside? General Li has promised to give us palace women as concubines. Where are they?" Emperor Xian turned to Jia Xu for help. Jia Xu secretly hosted a banquet for the tribal chiefs, gave them some expensive material gifts, and succeeded in making them leave. Li Jue lost the support of the tribal chiefs. (Note: (獻帝紀曰：傕時召羌、胡數千人，先以御物繒綵與之，又許以宮人婦女，欲令攻郭汜。羌、胡數來闚省門，曰：「天子在中邪！李將軍許我宮人美女，今皆安在？」帝患之，使詡為之方計。詡乃密呼羌、胡大帥飲食之，許以封爵重寶，於是皆引去。傕由此衰弱。) Xiandi Ji annotation in Sanguozhi vol. 10.) Jia Xu played an important role in resolving the conflict between Li Jue and Guo Si, and in ensuring Emperor Xian's safety during the time. (Note: (傕等和，出天子，祐護大臣，詡有力焉。) Sanguozhi vol. 10.) Later, after Emperor Xian escaped from Chang'an, Li Jue led his forces in pursuit and defeated forces led by the emperor's loyalists. He hated certain officials such as Zhao Wen (趙溫), Wang Wei (王偉), Zhou Zhong (周忠) and Rong Shao (榮邵), and wanted to execute them. Jia Xu advised him against it by saying: "They are the Emperor's subjects. How can you harm them?" Li Jue spared them. (Note: (獻帝紀曰：天子旣東，而李傕來追，王師敗績。司徒趙溫、太常王偉、衞尉周忠、司隷榮邵皆為傕所嫌，欲殺之。詡謂傕曰：「此皆天子大臣，卿柰何害之？」傕乃止。) Xiandi Ji annotation in Sanguozhi vol. 10.)

== Brief service under Duan Wei ==
After Emperor Xian left Chang'an, Jia Xu gave up his official post and left Li Jue. He heard that the general Duan Wei (段煨), who was from the same commandery as him, was stationed at Huayin County (華陰縣; present-day Huayin, Shaanxi), so he went to Huayin County to join Duan Wei. Jia Xu was well known among Duan Wei's men, so Duan Wei was fearful that Jia Xu would seize the position of leadership from him. He pretended to treat Jia Xu respectfully while secretly keeping a close watch on him. Jia Xu knew that Duan Wei was suspicious of him, and he felt very uneasy. (Note: (天子旣出，詡上還印綬。是時將軍段煨屯華陰，與詡同郡，遂去傕託煨。詡素知名，為煨軍所望。煨內恐其見奪，而外奉詡禮甚備，詡愈不自安。) Sanguozhi vol. 10.)

Around 196, the warlord Zhang Xiu was based in Nanyang Commandery (南陽郡; around present-day Nanyang, Henan). Jia Xu secretly contacted Zhang Xiu and conveyed his intention to join him; Zhang Xiu agreed and sent his men to receive Jia Xu. Before Jia Xu left Duan Wei, someone asked him, "(Duan) Wei treated you generously. Why are you leaving?" Jia Xu replied, "(Duan) Wei is suspicious by nature and he's wary of me. Even though he treats me generously now, I believe he will harm me eventually. However, if I leave now, he will be more than happy to see me gone. If I manage to help him find an external ally, he will treat my family well. (Zhang) Xiu lacks a strategist, so he definitely hopes to have me on his side. By leaving, I can protect myself and my family." (Note: (張繡在南陽，詡陰結繡，繡遣人迎詡。詡將行，或謂詡曰：「煨待君厚矣，君安去之？」詡曰：「煨性多疑，有忌詡意，禮雖厚，不可恃，乆將為所圖。我去必喜，又望吾結大援於外，必厚吾妻子。繡無謀主，亦願得詡，則家與身必俱全矣。」) Sanguozhi vol. 10.)

== Service under Zhang Xiu ==
An illustration of Jia Xu by an unknown artist.

Jia Xu left Duan Wei and headed to Nanyang Commandery, where Zhang Xiu welcomed him and treated him like a family elder. As Jia Xu foresaw, Duan Wei was pleased to see that Jia Xu had not only left, but also helped him gain Zhang Xiu as an ally. Jia Xu urged Zhang Xiu to form an alliance with Liu Biao, the Governor of Jing Province, (Note: (詡遂往，繡執子孫禮，煨果善視其家。詡說繡與劉表連和。) Sanguozhi vol. 10.) and went to speak to Liu Biao. Liu Biao treated him like an honoured guest. Jia Xu remarked: "(Liu) Biao has the ability to serve as a Ducal Minister in times of peace. However, he not only lacks foresight, but is also suspicious and indecisive, hence he won't be successful." (Note: (傅子曰：詡南見劉表，表以客禮待之。詡曰：「表，平世三公才也；不見事變，多疑無決，無能為也。」) Fu Zi annotation in Sanguozhi vol. 10.)

=== Battles against Cao Cao ===
In 198, the warlord Cao Cao attacked Zhang Xiu again despite having suffered an earlier defeat at the Battle of Wancheng in 197. However, he pulled back his forces after learning that Tian Feng, an adviser to his rival, Yuan Shao, had urged Yuan Shao to attack Xu (許; present-day Xuchang, Henan) (Note: In 196, Cao Cao received Emperor Xian, who had taken shelter in the ruins of Luoyang after escaping from Chang'an, and brought him to his base in Xu (許; present-day Xuchang, Henan). Xu became the new imperial capital and seat of the central government.) while he was away at war with Zhang Xiu. Zhang Xiu wanted to seize the opportunity to launch a counterattack, but Jia Xu warned him not to and predicted that he would be lose the battle. Zhang Xiu ignored him and led his troops to pursue Cao Cao's retreating forces. The result was just like what Jia Xu predicted. When Zhang Xiu came back after his defeat, Jia Xu told him to attack again and predicted that he would win this time. Zhang Xiu said: "I didn't listen to you earlier, which resulted in my defeat. Now that I have lost, why should I attack again?" Jia Xu replied: "Changes have taken place. You'll win if you swiftly attack now." Zhang Xiu heeded Jia Xu's advice and attacked Cao Cao again. He won the battle this time. (Note: (太祖比征之，一朝引軍退，繡自追之。詡謂繡曰：「不可追也，追必敗。」繡不從，進兵交戰，大敗而還。詡謂繡曰：「促更追之，更戰必勝。」繡謝曰：「不用公言，以至於此。今已敗，柰何復追？」詡曰：「兵勢有變，亟往必利。」繡信之，遂收散卒赴追，大戰，果以勝還。) Sanguozhi vol. 10.)

Zhang Xiu asked Jia Xu: "When I led my best troops to attack Cao Cao while he was retreating, you predicted I would lose. When I led my troops to attack Cao Cao again just after he defeated me, you predicted I would win. Your predictions turned out to be accurate. But why is it that your predictions seem so counter-intuitive?" Jia Xu replied: "It's easy to understand. General, you may be skilled in warfare, but you are still no match for Cao Cao. When Cao Cao withdrew his forces, I knew he would personally lead his rearguard to cover his retreat. Even though your troops are well-trained, Cao Cao is better than you as a military leader, and his troops are as equally well-trained as yours. Therefore, I knew you would lose. When Cao Cao first attacked you and decided to retreat halfway even though he didn't make any mistakes, I believed something must have happened in his base. After he defeated your pursuing forces, he would lower his guard and hastily retreat. His officers will then take command of the rearguard. They may be brave, but they are no match for you. Therefore, I knew you would win them even though you are leading a group of soldiers who have just been defeated." Zhang Xiu was very impressed with Jia Xu's analysis. (Note: (問詡曰：「繡以精兵追退軍，而公曰必敗；退以敗卒擊勝兵，而公曰必剋。悉如公言，何其反而皆驗也？」詡曰：「此易知耳。將軍雖善用兵，非曹公敵也。軍雖新退，曹公必自斷後；追兵雖精，將旣不敵，彼士亦銳，故知必敗。曹公攻將軍無失策，力未盡而退，必國內有故；已破將軍，必輕軍速進，縱留諸將斷後，諸將雖勇，亦非將軍敵，故雖用敗兵而戰必勝也。」繡乃服。) Sanguozhi vol. 10.)

=== Persuading Zhang Xiu to surrender to Cao Cao ===
In 199, when Cao Cao and Yuan Shao were about to clash at the Battle of Guandu, Yuan Shao sent a messenger to meet Zhang Xiu and propose an alliance between them against Cao Cao. Zhang Xiu wanted to agree, but Jia Xu, who was beside him, said to Yuan Shao's messenger: "I say 'No, thank you.' to Yuan Benchu. He can't even accommodate his own brother. What makes him think he can accommodate talents from around the Empire?" A shocked Zhang Xiu turned to Jia Xu and asked: "Why do you have to say this? What will become of me now?" Jia Xu replied: "Why don't you submit to Cao Cao?" Zhang Xiu asked: "Yuan Shao is powerful while Cao Cao is weak. Besides, I am also Cao Cao's enemy. What will happen if I submit to him?" Jia Xu replied: "That's why it is better for you to submit to Cao Cao. He controls the Empire in the name of the Emperor. This is the first reason why you should submit to him. Yuan Shao is militarily more powerful. You have less troops than him, so even if you join him, he won't regard you highly. Cao Cao has less troops. If you join him, he'll be delighted. This is the second reason why you should submit to him. A man who aspires to become a great ruler will be more willing to put aside personal enmities and make his virtues known to people. This is the third reason why you should submit to Cao Cao. I hope you won't have any more doubts." Zhang Xiu heeded Jia Xu's advice and led his forces to surrender to and join Cao Cao. (Note: (是後，太祖拒袁紹於官渡，紹遣人招繡，并與詡書結援。繡欲許之，詡顯於繡坐上謂紹使曰：「歸謝袁本初，兄弟不能相容，而能容天下國士乎？」繡驚懼曰：「何至於此！」竊謂詡曰：「若此，當何歸？」詡曰：「不如從曹公。」繡曰：「袁彊曹弱，又與曹為讎，從之如何？」詡曰：「此乃所以宜從也。夫曹公奉天子以令天下，其宜從一也。紹彊盛，我以少衆從之，必不以我為重。曹公衆弱，其得我必喜，其宜從二也。夫有霸王之志者，固將釋私怨，以明德於四海，其宜從三也。願將軍無疑！」繡從之，率衆歸太祖。) Sanguozhi vol. 10.)

== Service under Cao Cao ==
Cao Cao was very pleased to see Jia Xu. He held Jia Xu's hand and said: "You are the person who helps to make my trustworthiness known throughout the Empire." Jia Xu was appointed Bearer of the Mace (執金吾) and enfeoffed as a Marquis of a Chief Village (都亭侯). He was later promoted to the position of Governor (牧) of Ji Province. As Ji Province was still under Yuan Shao's control then, Jia Xu served as a military adviser to Cao Cao, who then held the appointment of Minister of Works (司空). (Note: (太祖見之，喜，執詡手曰：「使我信重於天下者，子也。」表詡為執金吾，封都亭侯，遷兾州牧。兾州未平，留參司空軍事。) Sanguozhi vol. 10.)

=== Advising Cao Cao during the Battle of Guandu ===
During the Battle of Guandu, when his supplies were running out after a prolonged stalemate against Yuan Shao, Cao Cao sought advice from Jia Xu, who said: "My lord, you're wiser than (Yuan) Shao, braver than (Yuan) Shao, better at managing people than (Yuan) Shao, and more decisive than (Yuan) Shao. You have these four strengths, but the reason why you are unable to defeat him after six months is because you have been focusing too much on defence. You should be decisive when the opportunity arises, and victory will follow soon." Cao Cao replied, "Fine." He then led his forces to attack Yuan Shao's camps, which were spread out a distance of over 30 li, and destroyed them. Cao Cao won a decisive victory over Yuan Shao at the Battle of Guandu and subsequently conquered the rest of Yuan's territories north of the Yellow River. (Note: (袁紹圍太祖於官渡，太祖糧方盡，問詡計焉出，詡曰：「公明勝紹，勇勝紹，用人勝紹，決機勝紹，有此四勝而半年不定者，但顧萬全故也。必決其機，須臾可定也。」太祖曰：「善。」乃并兵出，圍擊紹三十餘里營，破之。紹軍大潰，河北平。) Sanguozhi vol. 10.)

=== Advising Cao Cao against attacking Sun Quan ===
When Cao Cao was appointed as the Governor of Ji Province after pacifying northern China, Jia Xu was reassigned to be a Palace Counsellor (太中大夫) instead. In 208, after Cao Cao had annexed Jing Province, he planned to press on and attack the territories in Jiangdong controlled by the warlord Sun Quan. Jia Xu advised him against it and said: "My lord, you have defeated the Yuans and now you have taken Jing Province. Your name spreads throughout the Empire and your military is very strong. If you follow in the footsteps of the Chu state by attracting talents to serve in the government and by improving the lives of the people, you won't need to resort to force to subdue the Jiangdong territories. They will be submit to you on their own." Cao Cao ignored Jia Xu and proceeded to attack Jiangdong. He lost the decisive Battle of Red Cliffs against the allied forces of Sun Quan and Liu Bei later that year. (Note: (太祖領兾州牧，徙詡為太中大夫。建安十三年，太祖破荊州，欲順江東下。詡諫曰：「明公昔破袁氏，今收漢南，威名遠著，軍勢旣大；若乘舊楚之饒，以饗吏士，撫安百姓，使安土樂業，則可不勞衆而江東稽服矣。」太祖不從，軍遂無利。) Sanguozhi vol. 10.)

Pei Songzhi, who annotated Jia Xu's biography in the Sanguozhi, argued that Jia Xu's advice to Cao Cao was inappropriate. He pointed out that Cao Cao's territories lacked the stability necessary for Cao Cao to do as Jia Xu advised – focus on economic development in Jing Province. Moreover, Cao Cao had to deal with the external threats posed by warlords such as Han Sui and Ma Chao in the northwest. Pei Songzhi noted that Jing Province was highly unstable and would not remain under Cao Cao's control for long, because of the polarising effects of the presences of Liu Bei and Sun Quan in the region. He pointed out that during the Battle of Jiangling in 208, Cao Cao's general Cao Ren still lost Jiangling Commandery to Sun Quan and Liu Bei's forces despite his best efforts at defending it. Pei Songzhi thus concluded that it was impossible for Cao Cao to focus on economic development in Jing Province, given how unstable the region was, therefore Jia Xu's advice was inappropriate. He argued that Cao Cao made a right choice to attack Jiangdong at the right time, when he had resources for naval warfare acquired from his recent annexation of Jing Province. He also mentioned that Cao Cao's defeat at the Battle of Red Cliffs was not due to miscalculation or poor planning, but because of uncontrollable factors such as the plague which affected his troops and the winds which fanned the fire that destroyed his naval fleet. (Note: (臣松之以為詡之此謀，未合當時之宜。于時韓、馬之徒尚狼顧關右，魏武不得安坐郢都以威懷吳會，亦已明矣。彼荊州者，孫、劉之所必爭也。荊人服劉主之雄姿，憚孫權之武略，為日旣乆，誠非曹氏諸將所能抗禦。故曹仁守江陵，敗不旋踵，何撫安之得行，稽服之可期？將此旣新平江、漢，威懾揚、越，資劉表水戰之具，藉荊楚檝櫂之手，實震蕩之良會，廓定之大機。不乘此取吳，將安俟哉？至於赤壁之敗，蓋有運數。實由疾疫大興，以損淩厲之鋒，凱風自南，用成焚如之勢。天實為之，豈人事哉？然則魏武之東下，非失筭也。詡之此規，為無當矣。魏武後克平張魯，蜀中一日數十驚，劉備雖斬之而不能止，由不用劉曄之計，以失席卷之會，斤石旣差，悔無所及，即亦此事之類也。世咸謂劉計為是，即愈見賈言之非也。) Pei Songzhi's annotation in Sanguozhi vol. 10.)

=== Advising Cao Cao during the Battle of Tong Pass ===
In 211, Cao Cao engaged a coalition of northwestern warlords led by Han Sui and Ma Chao at the Battle of Tong Pass. Ma Chao and others agreed to make peace with Cao Cao on two conditions. Firstly, Cao Cao had to give up the northwestern territories to them. Secondly, Cao Cao had to grant them official titles. Jia Xu suggested that Cao Cao pretend to agree to their terms, and then try to sow discord among them. Cao Cao heeded Jia Xu's advice. When internal conflict broke out between Han Sui and Ma Chao, Cao Cao took advantage of the situation to attack them and achieved victory. (Note: (太祖後與韓遂、馬超戰於渭南，超等索割地以和，并求任子。詡以為可偽許之。又問詡計策，詡曰：「離之而已。」太祖曰：「解。」一承用詡謀。語在武紀。卒破遂、超，詡本謀也。) Sanguozhi vol. 10.)

=== Role in the succession struggle between Cao Pi and Cao Zhi ===
Sometime between 211 and 217, (Note: Cao Pi was appointed General of the Household for All Purposes (五官中郎將) in the spring of 211. He was designated as Cao Cao's heir apparent in 217. Therefore, the succession struggle between Cao Pi and Cao Zhi took place between 211 and 217.) a power struggle broke out between two of Cao Cao's sons over the succession to the "King of Wei" (魏王), the nominal vassal king title held by their father. One of them was Cao Pi, Cao Cao's oldest surviving son, who held the appointment of General of the Household for All Purposes (五官中郎將). The other was Cao Zhi, who held the title "Marquis of Linzi" (臨菑侯) and was famous for his literary talent. Each of them had a faction supporting him. (Note: (是時，文帝為五官將，而臨菑侯植才名方盛，各有黨與，有奪宗之議。) Sanguozhi vol. 10.)

Cao Pi sent a messenger to meet Jia Xu and seek his advice on how to consolidate his position. Jia Xu replied: "I hope you will behave in a virtuous and humble manner, perform your duties faithfully, and be a filial son. That is all." Cao Pi took Jia Xu's advice very seriously and did as he was told. (Note: (文帝使人問詡自固之術，詡曰：「願將軍恢崇德度，躬素士之業，朝夕孜孜，不違子道。如此而已。」文帝從之，深自砥礪。) Sanguozhi vol. 10.)

Cao Cao faced a dilemma on choosing between his two sons so he consulted Jia Xu, who refused to give an answer. Cao Cao asked him: "Why don't you give an answer?" Jia Xu replied: "I am still thinking about something, so I can't give an answer yet." Cao Cao asked, "What are you thinking of?" Jia Xu replied, "I am thinking of Yuan Benchu, Liu Jingsheng, and their sons." (Note: Yuan Shao and Liu Biao faced similar dilemmas as Cao Cao when they had to choose one of their sons to succeed them. Both Yuan Shao and Liu Biao eventually chose a younger son – Yuan Shang in Yuan Shao's case, and Liu Cong in Liu Biao's case – instead of their eldest son, which ultimately resulted in power struggles between their sons. Jia Xu was essentially hinting to Cao Cao that he should choose Cao Pi.) Cao Cao laughed, made up his mind, and designated Cao Pi as his heir apparent. (Note: (太祖又嘗屏除左右問詡，詡嘿然不對。太祖曰：「與卿言而不荅，何也？」詡曰：「屬適有所思，故不即對耳。」太祖曰：「何思？」詡曰：「思袁本初、劉景升父子也。」太祖大笑，於是太子遂定。) Sanguozhi vol. 10.)

Jia Xu was aware that he had not served under Cao Cao for as long as many of his colleagues. He foresaw that he might incur the jealousy and suspicions of others, hence he maintained a very low profile and distanced himself from his colleagues outside of the workplace. He also ensured that his children did not marry people from influential families. He earned the respect and admiration of many strategists and advisers. (Note: (詡自以非太祖舊臣，而策謀深長，懼見猜疑，闔門自守，退無私交，男女嫁娶，不結高門，天下之論智計者歸之。) Sanguozhi vol. 10.)

== Service under Cao Pi ==
On 6 April 220, while Cao Pi was still King of Wei, Jia Xu was appointed as Grand Commandant (太尉). (Note: ([延康元年二月]壬戌，以大中大夫贾诩为太尉...) Sanguozhi, vol.02) In late 220, Cao Pi forced Emperor Xian to abdicate the throne to him, thus ending the Han dynasty. He then established the state of Wei with himself as its first emperor. After ascending the throne, Jia Xu remained as Grand Commandant; he was also promoted from a Marquis of a Chief Village to the Marquis of Weishou District (魏壽鄉侯), with a marquisate of 800 taxable households. (Note: (文帝即位，以詡為太尉，進爵魏壽鄉侯，增邑三百，并前八百戶。又分邑二百，封小子訪為列侯。以長子穆為駙馬都尉。) Sanguozhi vol. 10.) Jia Xu's promotion was allegedly an expression of gratitude from Cao Pi, who wanted to thank him for helping him seize the succession years ago. (Note: (魏略曰：文帝得詡之對太祖，故即位首登上司。) Weilue annotation in Sanguozhi vol. 10.) Sun Quan laughed when he heard that Cao Pi had appointed Jia Xu as his Grand Commandant. (Note: (荀勗別傳曰：晉司徒闕，武帝問其人於勗。荅曰：「三公具瞻所歸，不可用非其人。昔魏文帝用賈詡為三公，孫權笑之。」) Xun Xu Biezhuan annotation in Sanguozhi vol. 10.)

=== Advising Cao Pi against attacking Eastern Wu ===
Sometime between 220 and 223, Cao Pi wanted to attack and conquer Wei's two rival states, Wu and Shu. He consulted Jia Xu on which of the two he should attack first. (Note: (帝問詡曰：「吾欲伐不從命以一天下，吳、蜀何先？」) Sanguozhi vol. 10.)

Jia Xu replied: "Before you can conquer others, you have to build up military power first. Before you can establish a power base, you have to promote civil culture. Your Majesty has received the Mandate of Heaven in a timely fashion and now rules over the Empire. If you can promote civil culture while waiting for an opportunity to strike, it won't be difficult for you to conquer your enemies. Wu and Shu may be small and insignificant states, but they are shielded by natural geographical barriers such as mountains and rivers. Liu Bei has talent and great ambition; Zhuge Liang excels in statecraft; Sun Quan understands trends and sees through deception; Lu Yi assesses military power very well. They control geographically advantageous locations, and have set up defences at strategic points and the rivers and lakes. It is not easy to plan an attack. According to military strategy, you should gain the upper hand first before actually fighting a battle. You should assess the enemy's strength, and then decide which generals to send into battle. This is to ensure that you don't miscalculate. From my observation, none of our officials are capable of rivalling (Liu) Bei and (Sun) Quan. Even though you may fight a war with the prestige of an Emperor, you can't win without making significant losses. In the past, Shun ordered his troops to brandish their weapons to scare the Youmiao into submission. (Note: Refers to an event during the reign of the mythical ruler Shun. The Youmiao (有苗) were a tribal people who often caused trouble at the border. Shun ordered his troops to get into formation and brandish their weapons at the Youmiao. The Youmiao were so terrified by the sight before them that they surrendered.) As of now, I think it is better to focus on civil affairs first before military affairs." (Note: (對曰：「攻取者先兵權，建本者尚德化。陛下應期受禪，撫臨率土，若綏之以文德而俟其變，則平之不難矣。吳、蜀雖蕞爾小國，依岨山水，劉備有雄才，諸葛亮善治國，孫權識虛實，陸議見兵勢，據險守要，汎舟江湖，皆難卒謀也。用兵之道，先勝後戰，量敵論將，故舉無遺策。臣竊料羣臣，無備、權對，雖以天威臨之，未見萬全之勢也。昔舜舞干戚而有苗服，臣以為當今宜先文後武。」) Sanguozhi vol. 10.)

Cao Pi refused to listen to Jia Xu. In 223, Wei sustained heavy losses at the Battle of Jiangling against Wu. (Note: (文帝不納。後興江陵之役，士卒多死。) Sanguozhi vol. 10.)

=== Death ===
Jia Xu died on 11 August 223 at the age of 77 (by East Asian age reckoning). He was given the posthumous title "Marquis Su" (肅侯). (Note: (詡年七十七，薨，謚曰肅侯。) Sanguozhi vol. 10.)

== Family and descendants ==
According to the New Book of Tang, Jia Yi, a notable scholar-politician who lived in the Western Han dynasty, was an ancestor of Jia Xu. Jia Xu's father, Jia Gong (賈龔), served as a General of Light Cavalry (輕騎將軍) in the Eastern Han dynasty and moved his residence to Wuwei Commandery, where Jia Xu was born. Jia Xu had an elder brother, Jia Cai (賈綵).

Jia Xu had at least three sons. His eldest son, Jia Mu (賈穆), was a Chief Commandant of Escorting Cavalry (駙馬都尉). After Jia Xu's death, Jia Mu inherited his father's marquis title, Marquis of Weishou District (魏壽鄉侯). He also served as the Administrator (太守) of various commanderies. (Note: (子穆嗣，歷位郡守。穆薨，子模嗣。) Sanguozhi vol. 10.) Jia Xu's youngest son, Jia Fang (賈訪), was given a marquis title and 200 taxable households around the same time as when Jia Xu was enfeoffed as the Marquis of Weishou District. (Note: (文帝即位，以詡為太尉，進爵魏壽鄉侯，增邑三百，并前八百戶。又分邑二百，封小子訪為列侯。以長子穆為駙馬都尉。) Sanguozhi vol. 10.) According to the Xin Tang Shu, Jia Xu had a son, Jia Ji (賈璣), who also served as a Chief Commandant of Escorting Cavalry like Jia Mu, and held the title of a Secondary Marquis (關內侯). Jia Ji is not mentioned in Jia Xu's official biography in the Sanguozhi.

When Jia Mu died, his marquis title was passed on to his son, Jia Mo (賈模). (Note: (子穆嗣，歷位郡守。穆薨，子模嗣。) Sanguozhi vol. 10.) According to the Wei Jin Shiyu (魏晋世語), Jia Mo served as a Regular Mounted Attendant (散騎常侍) and General Who Protects the Army (護軍將軍) during the reign of Emperor Hui in the Western Jin dynasty. Jia Mo had two sons, Jia Yin (賈胤) and Jia Kan (賈龕). Jia Yin, Jia Kan, and their cousin Jia Ya, served in the Jin government and held high official positions. (Note: (世語曰：模，晉惠帝時為散騎常侍、護軍將軍，模子胤，胤弟龕，從弟疋，皆至大官，並顯於晉也。) Shiyu annotation in Sanguozhi vol. 10.)

== Writings ==
Jia Xu annotated the military treatise Wuzi and wrote another military text called Wu Sun Zi Sanshi'er Lei Jing (吳孫子三十二壘經). He also created a copy of Sun Tzu's The Art of War.

== Appraisal ==
Chen Shou, who wrote Jia Xu's biography in the Sanguozhi, appraised him as follows: "Xun You and Jia Xu were very detailed in their strategising and had never miscalculated before. However, in terms of adaptability and flexibility, they were second to (Zhang) Liang and (Chen) Ping." (Note: (荀攸、賈詡，庶乎筭無遺策，經達權變，其良、平之亞與！) Sanguozhi vol. 10.)

Pei Songzhi, who annotated the Sanguozhi, disagreed with Chen Shou. He believed that biographies should be categorised in the same volume on the basis of similarities. He argued that Jia Xu's biography should be in the same volume as the biographies of Cheng Yu and Guo Jia rather than in the same volume as the biographies of Xun Yu and Xun You. In Pei Songzhi's opinion, Jia Xu was more similar to the former two than to the latter two. Pei Songzhi even remarked, "The difference between the moral characters of Xun You and Jia Xu is like the difference between moonlight and candlelight. Both give off light, but they are fundamentally different." He also criticised Chen Shou for appraising Xun You and Jia Xu in the same sentence instead of appraising them separately. (Note: (臣松之以為列傳之體，以事類相從。張子房青雲之士，誠非陳平之倫。然漢之謀臣，良、平而已。若不共列，則餘無所附，故前史合之，蓋其宜也。魏氏如詡之儔，其比幸多，詡不編程、郭之篇，而與二荀並列；失其類矣。且攸、詡之為人，其猶夜光之與蒸燭乎！其照雖均，質則異焉。今荀、賈之評，共同一稱，尤失區別之宜也。) Pei Songzhi's annotation in Sanguozhi vol. 10.)

== In popular culture ==
Jia Xu was first introduced as a playable character in the seventh instalment of Koei's Dynasty Warriors video game series.

== See also ==
- Lists of people of the Three Kingdoms
