= Lady Qiong (Han dynasty) =

Lady Qiong was a Chinese noblewoman from the late Eastern Han dynasty. She was the wife of Guo Si, who ruled de facto China with Li Jue after Dong Zhuo's death. She is best-known for participating in a conspiracy to separate Guo Si and Li Jue, triggering infighting between the two that led to their downfall.

== Background ==
Lady Qiong lived during the collapse of the Han dynasty, a time marked by internal conflicts and the rise of warlords. Following the assassination of Dong Zhuo, a tyrannical warlord who controlled Emperor Xian, in 192, his followers, including Li Jue and Guo Si, seized power in Chang'an, holding the young emperor hostage. Initially allies, Guo Si and Li Jue shared control of the government, but their conflict, driven by personal rivalry, paranoia, and poor leadership, destabilized the Han court and contributed to their eventual downfall.

== Guo Si and Li Jue conflict ==
In 195, tensions between generals Guo Si and Li Jue boiled over. Lady Qiong, Guo Si’s wife, fueled their rift, suspecting Li Jue of plotting to poison her husband. To deepen mistrust, she manipulated food sent by Li Jue, claiming it was tainted, and even poisoned a gift herself, feeding it to a dog, which died, convincing Guo Si of Li Jue’s treachery. She also falsely accused Guo Si of an affair with one of Li Jue’s concubines, further stoking discord.

This sparked armed clashes between Guo Si and Li Jue’s forces, weakening both sides. Their rivalry erupted into open warfare in Chang’an as they fought for control of Emperor Xian. The chaos enabled the emperor’s escape in 196, with assistance from warlords like Zhang Yang. In 197, Guo Si was killed by his subordinate Wu Xi. No historical records detail Lady Qiong's fate after these events.

== Romance of the Three Kingdoms ==
In the 14th century historical novel, Romance of the Three Kingdoms, which romanticizes previous events and during the Three Kingdoms period of China, introduces Lady Qiong in Chapter 13. She is portrayed as a cunning figure who exacerbates the distrust between Guo Si and Li Jue.

== Sources ==
- Chen, Shou (3rd century). Records of the Three Kingdoms (Sanguozhi).
- Fan, Ye (5th century). Book of the Later Han (Houhanshu).
