= Dong Cheng (Han dynasty) =

Chinese Eastern Han general (died 200)

- 董承

General of Chariots of Cavalry (車騎將軍)
- In office 199 – 200
- Monarch: Emperor Xian of Han

Personal details
- Born: Unknown
- Died: 11 February 200 Xuchang, Henan
- Children: Lady Dong
- Occupation: Military general

Dong Cheng (died 11 February 200 (Note: According to the annals of Emperor Xian in Book of the Later Han, Dong Cheng was killed on the renwu day of the 1st month of the 5th year of the Jian'an era. This corresponds to 11 Feb 200 on the Julian calendar.)) was a Chinese military general who lived during the late Eastern Han dynasty of China. He was also the father of Lady Dong, a concubine of Emperor Xian.

== Life ==
Dong Cheng's origins are obscure: the Qing dynasty scholar Zhao Yiqing deduced that he was from the same clan as Dong Zhuo, while the Liu Song dynasty historian Pei Songzhi claimed that he was a nephew of Empress Dowager Dong, the mother of Emperor Ling (r. 168–189).

Dong Cheng served as a military officer under Niu Fu, a son-in-law of the warlord Dong Zhuo, who controlled the Han central government and the figurehead Emperor Xian (r. 189–220) between 189 and 192. His service under Niu Fu ended in 192 following Dong Zhuo's death and Niu Fu's assassination by his subordinate Youhu Chier (友胡赤兒).

In 195, Emperor Xian managed to escape from the generals Li Jue and Guo Si, who had been holding him hostage in Chang'an since 192, and return to the old imperial capital, Luoyang. Dong Cheng, Zhang Yang, Yang Feng, the White Wave Bandits and other loyalists came to protect the emperor from Li Jue and Guo Si, who attempted to capture him and bring him back to Chang'an.

After Emperor Xian and the loyalists reached Luoyang, internal conflict broke out between Dong Cheng and Yang Feng, who had support from the White Wave Bandits. Dong Cheng then chose to ally with the warlord Cao Cao. When Cao Cao showed up in Luoyang with his forces, Dong Cheng reported Han Xian and Yang Feng's wrongdoings to Emperor Xian and forced them to leave. Cao Cao then received Emperor Xian and escorted him to his own base in Xu (許; in present-day Xuchang, Henan), which became the new imperial capital.

As Emperor Xian feared that Cao Cao would attempt to dominate him and the central government and use him as a "trump card" against rival warlords, in 199 he appointed Dong Cheng as General of Chariots and Cavalry (車騎將軍) to balance against Cao Cao's influence in the imperial court. The emperor also gave Dong Cheng permission to open his own office and have his own staff – in the same way as Cao Cao did. Dong Cheng's daughter also became a concubine of Emperor Xian.

In the first month of the Chinese year 200, Dong Cheng allegedly (Note: Liu Bei's biography in Sanguozhi adopted this view; this was later adopted by Zizhi Tongjian as well. Liu Bei's biography in vol.6 of Chronicles of Huayang and the annals of Emperor Xian in Book of the Later Han both recorded that this secret edict existed.) received a secret imperial edict from Emperor Xian ordering him to eliminate Cao Cao, so he contacted a few officials and plotted with them to assassinate Cao Cao. These officials included Zhong Ji (种輯), Wang Zifu (王子服), Wu Zilan (吳子蘭) and Liu Bei. However, Cao Cao caught wind of their plot and had them arrested. He then charged them with treason and had all of them (except Liu Bei, who had already fled) executed along with their families. Dong Cheng's daughter, who was pregnant at the time, was also killed despite Emperor Xian's efforts to save her.

== See also ==
- Lists of people of the Three Kingdoms
