= Li Ru =

2nd-century Chinese politician and official

- 李儒

Palace Attendant
- In office 192 – ?
- Monarch: Emperor Xian of Han

Prefect of the Gentlemen of the Palace of Hongnong Kingdom (弘農郎中令)
- In office 189 – 192
- Monarch: Emperor Xian of Han
- Chancellor: Dong Zhuo

Personal details
- Born: Unknown Heyang County, Shaanxi
- Died: Unknown
- Occupation: Official, adviser
- Courtesy name: Wenyou (文優)

Li Ru, courtesy name Wenyou, was an official serving under the warlord Dong Zhuo during the late Eastern Han dynasty of China.

== Life ==
Li Ru was from Heyang County (郃陽縣), Zuopingyi (左馮翊), which is in present-day Heyang County, Shaanxi. He served as Prefect of the Gentlemen of the Palace of Hongnong Kingdom (弘農郎中令) when Dong Zhuo controlled the Han central government and the figurehead Emperor Xian between 189 and 192. In March 190, Dong Zhuo sent Li Ru to poison Liu Bian (the deposed Emperor Shao). After Dong Zhuo's death in May 192, he served under Li Jue, a former subordinate of Dong Zhuo. In the winter of 192, Li Jue recommended Li Ru to be a Palace Attendant, but Emperor Xian refused to endorse the recommendation and said: "Ru was formerly a Prefect of the Gentlemen of the Palace under the Prince of Hongnong [Liu Bian]. He killed my elder brother and ought to be punished." In defence of Li Ru, Li Jue said, "It was not Li Ru's intention to follow Dong Zhuo's order. We should not punish the innocent."

== In Romance of the Three Kingdoms ==
Li Ru has a greater role as a minor character in the 14th-century historical novel Romance of the Three Kingdoms, which romanticises the events before and during the Three Kingdoms period. In the novel, he is not just a trusted adviser of Dong Zhuo, but also a son-in-law of the warlord. As Dong Zhuo's advisor and henchman, he has a strong influence over many of the key decisions Dong Zhuo makes. For example, among other things, he advises Dong Zhuo to induce Lü Bu into defecting to his side from Ding Yuan, replace Emperor Shao with Emperor Xian, and relocate the imperial capital from Luoyang to Chang'an. When Dong Zhuo falls for the "beauty's trap" involving him, Lü Bu and Diaochan, Li Ru tries to warn Dong Zhuo about it but Dong Zhuo fails to heed his advice. After Dong Zhuo meets his end at the hands of Lü Bu in 192, Li Ru is arrested and executed for being an accomplice to Dong Zhuo's "crimes".

== See also ==
- Lists of people of the Three Kingdoms
