= Zhang Yang (warlord) =

Chinese official and warlord (died 198)

- 張楊

Grand Marshal (大司馬)
- In office 196 – 198
- Monarch: Emperor Xian of Han

General Who Pacifies the State (安國將軍)
- In office 195 – 196
- Monarch: Emperor Xian of Han

Administrator of Henei (河內太守)
- In office 191 – 196
- Monarch: Emperor Xian of Han

Personal details
- Born: Unknown Shanxi
- Died: 198 Henan
- Occupation: Politician, warlord
- Courtesy name: Zhishu (稚叔)
- Peerage: Marquis of Jinyang (晉陽侯)

Zhang Yang (died 198), courtesy name Zhishu, was a Chinese politician and warlord who lived during the late Eastern Han dynasty of China. Originally from Yunzhong Commandery (雲中郡; in today Hohhot) in the north, he eventually became the de facto ruler of Henei Commandery (河內郡; in modern northern Henan). A brave and lenient man, Zhang Yang would provide refuge for Emperor Xian of Han and be involved in court politics, eventually attaining the rank of Grand Marshal (大司馬). Seeking to help an old friend, he would be assassinated by a subordinate.

== Early life ==
Zhang Yang was known for his bravery and fighting skill so served as Assistant Officer for Military Affairs in his native Bing Province (present-day Shanxi). When Emperor Ling created his private Western Garden army, the Bing inspector Ding Yuan sent Zhang Yang to serve as a Major on the staff of the eunuch commander Jian Shuo. Following the Emperor's death, Jian Shuo lost a political struggle with imperial-in-law and General in Chief He Jin and was killed. Zhang Yang was then sent by He Jin back to his home to raise troops, as part of He Jin's failed efforts to pressure his eunuch opponents into resigning. Zhang Yang raised over a thousand men then focused on fighting bandits in Shangdang Commandery (上黨郡; in modern Changzhi city in southwestern Shanxi), perhaps hoping to recruit them.

== As a warlord ==
With He Jin's death and the rise of Dong Zhuo plunging the land into civil war, Zhang Yang attempted to seize Shangdang Commandery for himself but failed, so he plundered the surrounding counties with his army growing into the several thousands. When Yuan Shao led his forces to Henei for the campaign against Dong Zhuo, Zhang Yang and the Xiongnu Shanyu claimant Yufuluo joined him, camping at the Zhang river, though there were doubts about their loyalty with Yuan Shao, Han Fu’s officer Zhao Fu using that distrust and failure to use them has part of his urging Han Fu to hold on against Yuan Shao.

In 191 Yufuluo revolted and sought Zhang Yang's support; Zhang Yang's refusal resulted in his kidnapping and his forces absorbed in Yufuluo's. Yuan Shao dispatched Qu Yi after them and to the south of Ye they were defeated, though Yuan Shao's rival Gongsun Zan would accuse Yuan Shao of wrongly taking credit. Yufuluo and Zhang Yang went to Liyang (黎阳) where they defeated General on the Liao Geng Zhi and established a base at the important salient. Dong Zhuo appointed Zhang Yang as the Administrator of Henei Commandery and General Who Establishes Righteousness with Zhang Yang soon escaping from Yufuluo's grasp and establishing himself at Yewang, north-east across the Yellow River.

In 192, Zhang Yang harbored friend and Dong Zhuo's assassin Lü Bu, who was wanted by Dong Zhuo's successor Li Jue. Lü Bu left for Yuan Shao, putting further distance from Li Jue and the rewards offered, not long after, only to return in 193. With Li Jue still pressing for his death, Lü Bu suggested it would be wrong for Zhang Yang to kill a fellow man of Bing Province, but Zhang Yang could get reward by seeming to offer Lü Bu to Li Jue. Zhang Yang feigned to betray Lü Bu in public but remained friendly and secretly protected him. Nevertheless, Lü Bu's position of refuge was uncertain so he left for Zhang Miao not long after.

== Han Court ==
In 194, Cao Cao sought to reach out to the Han court to legitimize his position in Yan province, but Zhang Yang was between Cao Cao and the court in Chang'an. Zhang Yang's adviser Dong Zhao persuaded Zhang Yang it would be wiser to earn favour with Cao Cao and not only let the envoy Wang Bi through to the court, but also to wrote in backing Cao Cao. Sending an envoy to Cao Cao, in exchange Cao Cao sent gifts of dogs, horses, silk and gold. In 195, Yuan Shao's Administrator of Dong Zang Hong had fallen out with Yuan Shao and Zang Hong was besieged. In the exchange of diplomatic correspondence, Zang Hong's celebrated letter claimed Zhang Yang was one of the figures who might come to his aid, raiding the north and forcing Yuan Shao to turn back on the pleas of his officers. If Zhang Yang, who was rather busy, did indeed come to his aid, it is not recorded and Zang Hong would fall.

That same year, Emperor Xian escaped the forces of Li Jue and Guo Si and came to Dayang in the camp of Li Le with intent to go onto Anyi which put him in Zhang Yang's territory, Zhang Yang sent sacks of grains on the backs of thousands of men to feed the refugee court. Zhang Yang's hospitality earned him the appointment of General Who Pacifies the State (安國將軍) and the peerage "Marquis of Jinyang". Zhang Yang soon came to Anyi to pay tribute and homage and offered to provide refuge at the old capital of Luoyang, perhaps a bid to take control of the Emperor but this was rejected by the emperor's entourage and Zhang Yang left to Yewang. In 196, Zhang Yang sided with Dong Cheng in arguing the Emperor should return to the former capital of Luoyang and would send supplies to help Dong Cheng with the reconstruction of the imperial palace (which was burnt down by Dong Zhuo in 191), naming the Imperial apartments Yang'an. With Dong Cheng, Yang Feng and Han Xian running out of supplies on the road, he also helped feed the imperial escort. Having failed in the past to take in the Emperor and still on the outside of court, Zhang Yang told the court it was best he guard the outside and he returned to Henei. For his deeds he was promoted to Grand Marshal and when Cao Cao later made accusations, Emperor Xian ordered no more to be said due to Zhang Yang's past help.

== Death and legacy ==
In 198, as Cao Cao attacked Zhang Yang's old friend Lü Bu in Xu province, Zhang Yang lacked the resources to come to his aid and was some distance away but made a show of force and as a diversion at Dongshi village in Yewang. However, after he was assassinated by his subordinate Yang Chou (楊醜), who then attempted to surrender to Cao Cao only to be killed by Sui Gu (眭固), who then turned to Yuan Shao before being killed in battle with Cao Cao's forces under Shi Huan and Cao Ren. His destruction would be cited as part of a justification for making Cao Cao Duke of Wei in 213.

The Yingxiong Ji (英雄記) by contemporary Wang Can states that Zhang Yang was "of mild and merciful temperament, and under him there were no harsh punishments." It remarks he would pardon plots against him and weep, making no further inquiries into the matter. Chen Shou, in his commentary to the records of the era he compiled after the war, was less generous, remarking he and Tao Qian had power but were brought low, lacking the ability of even common folk.

== See also ==
- Lists of people of the Three Kingdoms
