= Yang Feng =

Eastern Han dynasty general (died 197)

- 楊奉

General of Chariots and Cavalry (車騎將軍)
- In office 196
- Monarch: Emperor Xian of Han

General Who Revives Righteousness (興義將軍)
- In office 195 – 196
- Monarch: Emperor Xian of Han

Personal details
- Born: Unknown
- Died: 197
- Occupation: General, bandit leader

Yang Feng (died 197) was a bandit leader and military general who lived during the late Eastern Han dynasty of China.

== Life ==
Yang Feng was a leader of the White Wave Bandits. Later, he became a subordinate of Li Jue. In 192, Li Jue, Guo Si and other former followers of the warlord Dong Zhuo banded together and attacked the Han imperial capital, Chang'an, and seized control of the central government and the figurehead Emperor Xian.

In 195, when internal conflict broke out between Li Jue and Guo Si, the former took Emperor Xian hostage while the latter took the emperor's subjects hostage to threaten each other. During this time, Yang Feng and Song Guo (宋果), another of Li Jue's subordinates, plotted to assassinate their superior but failed and were forced to leave Chang'an. After three months, Zhang Ji managed to persuade Li Jue and Guo Si to make peace, and allow Emperor Xian to return to the old imperial capital, Luoyang.

Yang Feng was appointed as General Who Revives Righteousness (興義將軍), after which he joined Guo Si, Yang Ding (楊定) and Dong Cheng in escorting the emperor back to Luoyang. Just as they reached the vicinity of Xinfeng (新豐) and Baling (霸陵), Guo Si changed his mind and wanted to bring Emperor Xian to Mei County (郿縣) instead. The emperor fled to Yang Feng's camp for shelter. Yang Feng, Yang Ding and Dong Cheng protected the emperor when Guo Si tried to seize him back. Guo Si retreated after his defeat, while the emperor resumed his journey to Luoyang under Yang Feng's protection.

Later in 195, Li Jue and Guo Si regretted their earlier decision to let Emperor Xian leave Chang'an, so they led their troops to pursue the emperor. Yang Feng led his troops to fight Li Jue and Guo Si but lost. He then summoned the White Wave Bandits, led by Li Le (李樂), Han Xian, Hu Cai (胡才) and others, to come to Emperor Xian's aid. Xiongnu forces led by Qubei also responded to the call and came to help Emperor Xian. They continued on their journey towards Luoyang after that. Li Jue quickly returned with more troops and defeated Yang Feng and killed several officials who fled with Emperor Xian. The emperor escaped across the Yellow River and reached Anyi (安邑).

Around August 196, Emperor Xian returned to Luoyang under the escort of Yang Feng and Dong Cheng. In recognition of their contributions, he appointed Yang Feng as General of Chariots and Cavalry (車騎將軍) and ordered him to garrison at Liang State (梁國). Around the same time, the warlord Cao Cao led his forces into Luoyang, found Emperor Xian, and escorted him to his base in Xu (許; present-day Xuchang, Henan), which became the new imperial capital. Yang Feng tried to stop Cao Cao but could not catch up in time.

After having Emperor Xian and the new central government firmly under his control, Cao Cao led his troops to attack Yang Feng in November 196 and defeated him. Xu Huang, one of Yang Feng's subordinates, surrendered and became a general under Cao Cao. While Yang Feng fled south to join the warlord Yuan Shu, Cao Cao proceeded to conquer Liang State (Yang Feng's previous base). After joining Yuan Shu, Yang Feng and Han Xian pillaged and looted several counties in Yang and Xu provinces.

In 197, Yuan Shu wanted to declare himself emperor and desired to have a neighbouring warlord, Lü Bu, as an ally. So he proposed a marriage between his son and Lü Bu's daughter. However, Lü Bu rejected the proposal after listening to Chen Gui's advice. In anger, Yuan Shu ordered his general Zhang Xun (張勳), with Yang Feng and Han Xian as his subordinates, to lead troops to attack Lü Bu. Lü Bu heeded Chen Gui's suggestion and managed to induce Yang Feng and Han Xian to turn against Yuan Shu. Yang Feng and Han Xian then joined Lü Bu in attacking Yuan Shu's forces, led by Zhang Xun, and defeated the enemy. After driving back Zhang Xun, Yang Feng and Han Xian led their men to pillage several territories until Zhongli (鍾離) before turning back. Later in 197, they were ordered by Lü Bu to lead their troops to loot the warlord Liu Bei's supplies. However Liu Bei successfully lured them into a trap and killed Yang Feng while Han Xian managed to escape.

== See also ==
- Lists of people of the Three Kingdoms
