= Hu Zhen =

Late 2nd century Chinese general

- 胡軫

Colonel-Director of Retainers (司隸校尉)
- In office 192 – ?
- Monarch: Emperor Xian of Han

Administrator of Dong Commandery (東郡太守)
- In office ?–?
- Monarch: Emperor Xian of Han

Personal details
- Born: Unknown; Liang Province
- Died: Unknown
- Occupation: Military officer
- Courtesy name: Wencai (文才)

Hu Zhen (fl. 190–192), courtesy name Wencai, was a military officer serving under the warlord Dong Zhuo during the late Eastern Han dynasty of China. He was described as an influential man from Liang Province (涼州).

In 191, he was sent to Yangren (陽人; believed to be near present-day Wenquan, Ruzhou, Henan), with 5,000 men to resist Sun Jian's invasion from the south. Hu Zhen and his comrade Lü Bu, who was in charge of cavalry, were not on good terms, so Lü Bu spread false rumours confusing the attack. Dong Zhuo's forces under Hu Zhen were heavily defeated by Sun Jian.

After Dong Zhuo's assassination in May 192, Hu Zhen served the new government under Wang Yun, but he was displeased with Wang Yun's arrogance. When Dong Zhuo's loyalists Li Jue and Guo Si rebelled against the new government, Wang sent Hu Zhen with Yang Ding (楊定) and Xu Rong to fight, or perhaps negotiate, with the rebels. However, Hu Zhen and Yang Ding joined the enemy soon after Xu Rong was killed in battle.

When Li Jue and Guo Si took over the capital Chang'an from Wang Yun, Hu Zhen became the Colonel-Director of Retainers (司隸校尉) under their command. With his position, he falsely convicted a local officer You Yin (游殷), with whom he quarrelled, and put You Yin to death. A few months later Hu Zhen became ill, saying You Yin's spirit had come for his crime, and died.

== In Romance of the Three Kingdoms ==
In the 14th-century historical novel Romance of the Three Kingdoms, Hu Zhen was slain by Cheng Pu, a military officer under Sun Jian, during the fictional Battle of Sishui Pass.

== See also ==
- Lists of people of the Three Kingdoms
