= Ding Yuan =

Chinese official and warlord (died 189)

- 丁原
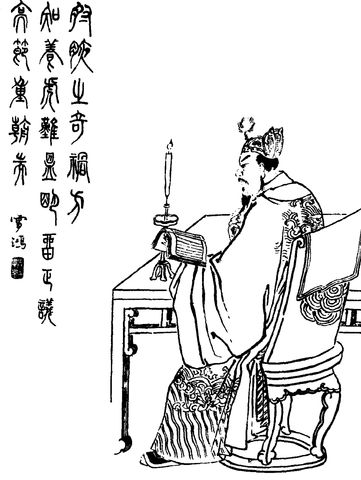
- A Qing dynasty illustration of Ding Yuan

Bearer of the Mace (執金吾)
- In office 189
- Monarch: Emperor Shao of Han

Inspector of Bing Province (并州刺史)
- In office ?–189
- Monarchs: Emperor Ling of Han / Emperor Shao of Han

Commandant of Martial Ferocity (武猛都尉)
- In office ?–189
- Monarchs: Emperor Ling of Han / Emperor Shao of Han

Cavalry Commandant (騎都尉)
- In office ?–189
- Monarchs: Emperor Ling of Han / Emperor Shao of Han

Personal details
- Born: Unknown
- Died: 189
- Occupation: Politician, warlord
- Courtesy name: Jianyang (建陽)

Ding Yuan (died c.26 September 189), courtesy name Jianyang, was a Chinese politician and warlord who lived during the late Eastern Han dynasty of China. In 189, both he and Dong Zhuo were summoned into the capital Luoyang with their individual troops to assist in the struggle against the powerful eunuch faction. However, Ding Yuan was eventually killed by his trusted aide Lü Bu, who had been bought over by Dong Zhuo.

== Life ==
According to the Records of Heroes (英雄記) by Wang Can, Ding Yuan was born in a poor family. Uncouth but brave, he was adept in horse riding and archery. During his early career as a county magistrate, he never turned away from his responsibility no matter the adversity or risk. He always pitched himself in front during confrontations with fugitive criminals and bandits.

In early 188, the northern frontiers in Bing province (并州; present-day Shanxi and the Hetao region in Inner Mongolia) fell into disorder when the Xiuchuge and Southern Xiongnu vassal tribes rose in rebellion, killing the provincial inspector, Zhang Yi (張懿) and the chanyu, Qiangqu. To quell the unrest, the Han court appointed Ding Yuan as the new Inspector of Bing province, later promoting him to Cavalry Commandant (騎都尉) and ordering him to garrison at Henei Commandery. Ding Yuan recruited several renowned warriors in the province, namely Zhang Yang, Zhang Liao and Lü Bu. Lü's martial prowess in particular greatly impressed Ding Yuan, who made him Chief Secretary and kept him close at side.

In May 189, Emperor Ling died. The General-in-Chief He Jin then summoned Ding Yuan into the capital Luoyang with his regional troops to assist in the power struggle against the eunuch faction. Before Ding Yuan arrived, however, the eunuchs assassinated He Jin. Dong Zhuo, a warlord from Liang Province (涼州; present-day western Gansu) who was also summoned by He Jin, arrived in Luoyang ahead of Ding Yuan and defeated the eunuchs, grasping military control of the capital.

After Ding Yuan arrived, Dong Zhuo managed to buy over Lü Bu, who killed Ding Yuan and presented the latter's head to Dong Zhuo.

== In Romance of the Three Kingdoms ==
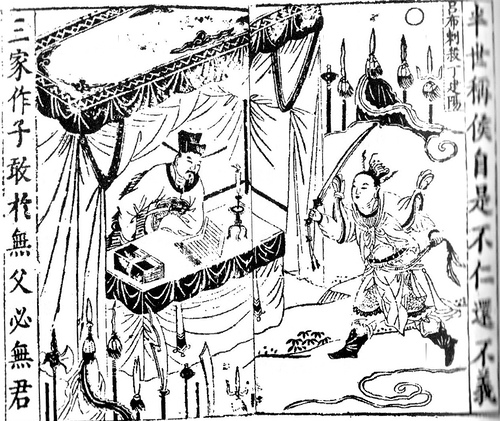
A Qing dynasty illustration of Lü Bu murdering Ding Yuan.

The 14th-century historical novel Romance of the Three Kingdoms is a romanticisation of the events that occurred before and during the Three Kingdoms period of China. In Chapter 3, Ding Yuan becomes a rival of Dong Zhuo after he opposes the latter's plan to depose Emperor Shao in favour of Emperor Xian. However, Dong Zhuo refrains from killing Ding Yuan on the spot because Ding Yuan's foster son, the formidable warrior Lü Bu, is protecting him.

Li Su, an official under Dong Zhuo who is from the same commandery as Lü Bu, then volunteers to persuade Lü Bu to defect to Dong Zhuo's side. Bringing along a famous steed named Red Hare and other extravagant gifts, he meets Lü Bu at his camp outside the city. Attracted by the gifts and feeling convinced by Li Su, Lü Bu agrees to betray his foster father and defect to Dong Zhuo's side. That very night, Lü Bu barges into Ding Yuan's tent, decapitates him and brings his head as a present to Dong Zhuo the following day.

== See also ==
- Lists of people of the Three Kingdoms
