= Fan Chou =

Chinese politician and general (died 195)

- 樊稠
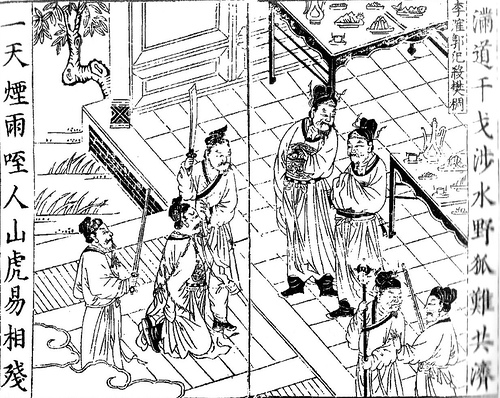
- A Qing dynasty illustration of Fan Chou's death

General of the Right (右將軍)
- In office 194 – 195
- Monarch: Emperor Xian of Han

General of the Household (中郎將)
- In office 192 – 194
- Monarch: Emperor Xian of Han

Personal details
- Born: Unknown; Yuzhong County, Gansu
- Died: 195; Xi'an, Shaanxi
- Occupation: General

Fan Chou (died 2 March 195) was a general serving under the warlord Dong Zhuo during the late Eastern Han dynasty of China.

== Life ==
Fan Chou was from Jincheng Commandery (金城郡), Liang Province, which is around present-day Yuzhong County, Gansu. He started his career as a subordinate of the warlord Dong Zhuo, who controlled the Han central government and the figurehead Emperor Xian between 189 and 192.

After Dong Zhuo was assassinated in Chang'an in May 192, Fan Chou joined a group of Dong Zhuo's followers, led by Li Jue and Guo Si, and seized back control of Chang'an from Wang Yun and Lü Bu. Li Jue and Guo Si then controlled the Han central government and Emperor Xian in the same way Dong Zhuo did. Around this time, they promoted Fan Chou to the rank of a General of the Household (中郎將).

In April 194, when a rival warlord Ma Teng led his forces to attack Li Jue and Guo Si, Fan Chou led troops to resist the enemy and defeated them at Changping Pass (長平關). In the same year, he also defeated Qiang rebels in Zuopingyi (左馮翊; around present-day Dali County, Shaanxi) and was further promoted to General of the Right (右將軍). He became one of the most powerful figures in the Han central government alongside Li Jue and Guo Si at the time.

During the battle against Ma Teng, Fan Chou had scolded Li Jue's nephew, Li Li (李利), who accompanied him into battle, for not doing his best. Li Li bore a grudge against Fan Chou for this. Later, he secretly reported to his uncle that Fan Chou was plotting with another rival warlord, Han Sui, against him. Li Jue thus became suspicious of Fan Chou, especially as Fan Chou gained higher status and more power. In March 195, Li Jue and Guo Si lured Fan Chou into a trap and assassinated him.

== See also ==
- Lists of people of the Three Kingdoms
