= Li Su (Han dynasty) =

Chinese military officer (died 192)

- 李肅

Cavalry Commandant (騎都尉)
- In office unknown – 192
- Monarch: Emperor Xian of Han

Personal details
- Born: Unknown; Jiuyuan District, Baotou, Inner Mongolia
- Died: 192; Lingbao City, Henan
- Occupation: Military officer

Li Su (died c.June 192) was a Chinese military officer serving under the warlords Dong Zhuo and Lü Bu during the Eastern Han dynasty of China.

== Biography ==
Li Su was from Wuyuan Commandery (五原郡), which was around present-day Baotou, Inner Mongolia. He served as a Cavalry Commandant (騎都尉) under Dong Zhuo, the warlord who controlled the Han central government and figurehead Emperor Xian between 189 and 192.

In May 192, Li Su joined Lü Bu and Wang Yun in a plot to assassinate Dong Zhuo in Chang'an. He led about a dozen soldiers and pretended to stand guard near the entrance. When Dong Zhuo arrived, Li Su tried to stab him with a ji, but Dong Zhuo's body armour saved him. Lü Bu then came up close and killed Dong Zhuo.

Later in 192, Lü Bu ordered Li Su to lead troops to attack and kill Niu Fu, Dong Zhuo's son-in-law. However, Niu Fu defeated Li Su in battle and forced him to retreat to Hongnong Commandery (弘農郡; south of present-day Lingbao City, Henan), where Lü Bu had him executed for his failure.

== In Romance of the Three Kingdoms ==
In the 14th-century historical novel Romance of the Three Kingdoms, Li Su was also credited with persuading Lü Bu to kill his adoptive father Ding Yuan and join Dong Zhuo. Among the many gifts Li Su brought along with him when he visited Lü Bu, the most outstanding one was the horse called the Red Hare.

== See also ==
- Lists of people of the Three Kingdoms
