= Niu Fu =

Chinese military general (died 192)

- 牛輔

General of the Household (中郎將)
- In office 189 – 192
- Monarch: Emperor Xian of Han
- Chancellor: Dong Zhuo

Personal details
- Born: Unknown
- Died: 192
- Spouse: Lady Dong
- Occupation: Military general, politician

Niu Fu (Chinese: 牛輔;) (died c. June 192 (Note: Sanguozhi indicated that Niu Fu died soon after Dong Zhuo, who died in May 192. Thus, Niu Fu's death date should be c. June 192)) was a Chinese military general and politician serving under the warlord Dong Zhuo during the late Eastern Han dynasty. A son-in-law of Dong Zhuo, he was appointed General of the Household and led troops against rebels and the coalition that opposed Dong Zhuo. After Dong Zhuo was assassinated in 192, Niu Fu was killed by one of his own subordinates while fleeing. The historical record portrays him as timid and superstitious.

== Life ==
Niu Fu served under the warlord Dong Zhuo when Dong was still serving as a military general in Liang Province during the reign of Emperor Ling (r. 168–189). Dong Zhuo deeply trusted Niu and arranged for him to marry his daughter. Niu Fu thus became a son-in-law of Dong Zhuo.

In 189, after Dong Zhuo occupied the imperial capital Luoyang and seized control of the Han central government, he appointed Niu Fu as a General of the Household (中郎將). Later that year, Dong Zhuo ordered Niu Fu to lead troops to attack the White Wave Bandits, who were causing trouble around Hedong Commandery (河東郡), but Niu Fu failed to defeat them.

Between 190 and 191, when Dong Zhuo was at war with a coalition of warlords from the east of Hangu Pass, Niu Fu deployed troops to defend the strategic mountain passes leading into Luoyang. At the same time, he also sent Dong Zhuo's other subordinates, such as Li Jue, Guo Si and Zhang Ji, to lead soldiers to raid and pillage Chenliu (陳留) and Yingchuan (潁川) commanderies, as well as attack the general Zhu Jun at Zhongmu County (中牟縣).

In May 192, Dong Zhuo was assassinated by his subordinate Lü Bu in Chang'an, after which Lü Bu ordered his subordinate Li Su to lead his troops to attack and kill Niu Fu. Niu Fu defeated Li Su and forced him to retreat to Hongnong Commandery (弘農郡). Later, chaos broke out in Niu Fu's camp and many of his soldiers deserted. Niu Fu, left with only five or six men, ordered them to quickly grab all the valuables and flee with him. During the escape, Youhu Chier (友胡赤兒), (Note: This name is per Sanguozhi, vol. 6. His name was recorded as "Zhihu Chier" (支胡赤兒) in Xiandi Ji, which was cited as an annotation in Li Jue's and Guo Si's biographies in Houhanshu.) one of Niu Fu's subordinates, betrayed him and killed him, and then cut off his head and sent it to Chang'an.

== Personality ==
As Niu was cowardly and superstitious, he always used his tally to assert his authority, and carried weapons for self-protection. He frequently asked diviners to make prophecies about his visitors, to determine their intentions before accepting their visit.

When Dong Yue (董越) visited, Niu Fu had him divined; the diviners read the I Ching hexagram as a sign that Dong Yue was plotting against him, and Niu Fu had him killed. By the account of the Xiandi Ji, the diviners, whom Dong Yue had often caned, gave this reading in revenge.

== See also ==
- Lists of people of the Three Kingdoms
