= Guo Si =

Chinese military general (died 197)

- 郭汜
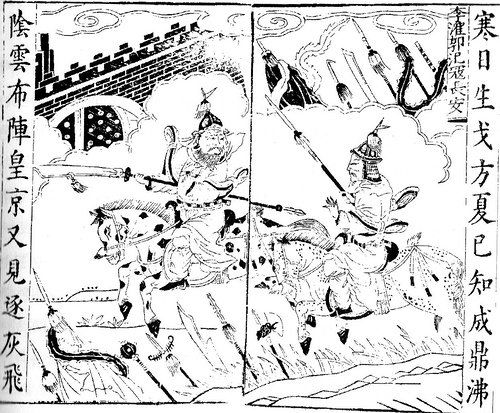
- After Dong Zhuo's death, Guo Si and Li Jue sacked the Han capital at Chang'an. This is a Qing dynasty illustration depicting the attack.

General of Chariots and Cavalry (車騎將軍)
- In office 195–197
- Monarch: Emperor Xian of Han

General of the Rear (後將軍)
- In office 192–195
- Monarch: Emperor Xian of Han

Personal details
- Born: Unknown Yongchang County, Gansu
- Died: 197 Mei County, Shaanxi
- Occupation: Military general, politician, warlord
- Peerage: Marquis of Meiyang (美陽侯)
- Other name: Guo Duo (郭多)

Guo Si (died 197), also known as Guo Duo, was a Chinese military general, politician, and warlord serving under the warlord Dong Zhuo during the late Eastern Han dynasty of China. He assisted Dong Zhuo in his many campaigns and served as a subordinate of Dong Zhuo's son-in-law, Niu Fu, after Dong Zhuo relocated the imperial capital to Chang'an. He later became one of the de facto regents of Emperor Xian, wherein they occupied the capital and held the emperor and imperial officials hostage. However, his downfall came when he quarrelled with his co-regent, Li Jue. He and Li Jue were ultimately defeated by Yang Feng and Dong Cheng, who assisted the emperor to flee the capital. Guo Si was eventually betrayed and murdered by one of his subordinates.

== Early to mid-career ==
In his early life, he was a horse thief before joining Dong Zhuo's ranks.

As an early supporter of Dong Zhuo, he participated in most of Dong Zhuo's major battles, including the subjugation of the Yellow Turban rebels, the battle of Liang Province, and the war with the coalition against Dong Zhuo.

At the start of the war with the eastern warlords, Guo Si was sent to assist Niu Fu to improve the defences of Mei County. They built up fortifications and stored 30 years of food supply there before Dong Zhuo moved the capital to Chang'an from Luoyang. After Hu Zhen and Lü Bu suffered a major defeat at the hands of Sun Jian and Dong Zhuo's retreat to Chang'an, Niu Fu, Guo Si and Li Jue were ordered to station themselves in Shan (present-day Shaanxi), which was the battle front against the anti-Dong-Zhuo coalition. At the time the alliance was having internal conflicts and did not focus on fighting Guo Si and Li Jue, so the senior general Zhu Jun could only ask his old friend, Tao Qian to give him a hand in a futile effort to fight the forces of Dong Zhuo. Tao Qian, despite having a general alliance with Dong Zhuo, sent 3,000 elite Danyang troops to help Zhu Jun in his battle against Guo Si and Li Jue at Zhongmu County, where Zhu Jun was totally crushed. Guo Si, Li Jue and Zhang Ji then carried out raids in the Chenliu and Yingchuan commanderies, which Cao Cao was unable to stop and many residents there were captured and enslaved.

== Battle of Chang'an ==
Because he was stationed outside the capital, Guo Si was able to return to Liang Province when Dong Zhuo was assassinated by Lü Bu. Along with his comrades, Fan Chou, Li Jue and Zhang Ji, Guo Si initially wanted to make Niu Fu their leader, but the latter was so scared and listened to his subordinate, Huchi'er (胡赤兒), to flee with the treasures he had saved. However, Huchi'er murdered Niu Fu after he decided to take the wealth of his master for himself. Guo Si, along the other three generals, then pleaded with the de facto leader of the Han central government, Wang Yun, for an amnesty since they were Dong Zhuo's most trusted aides. Instead, Wang Yun granted amnesty to all of Dong Zhuo's former subordinates except for these four. So they planned to relinquish their positions and go into hiding. Jia Xu suggested that they should take the opportunity to launch a strike at Chang'an since the Liang Province forces' power base was still intact after the coup. At the beginning of their campaign, few Liang Province residents joined them, only several thousands soldiers followed the four, but the number grew along the way. Wang Yun sent Xu Rong and Hu Zhen to fight the Liang Province forces en route at An'feng, but Xu Rong was killed in the first encounter and Hu Zhen persuaded his troops to join the rebels thus greatly increasing the size of the rebel force. A fierce battle was fought outside the walls of Chang'an, during which Guo Si personally duelled Lü Bu. Guo Si was defeated after being pierced by Lü Bu's spear. But he survived the wound and the Liang Province army pushed Lü Bu back into the city. The four then surrounded Chang'an with their army and suggested that they would leave if Wang Yun would go with them. Wang Yun, thinking that the four rebels only wanted his life and did not have the intention of conquering the city, committed suicide. After Wang Yun's death, the rebels managed to take control of Chang'an and secured power for themselves within the Han central government by taking Emperor Xian hostage and taking control over the selection of imperial officials for the emperor.

== As a regent ==
The four then demanded high ranks, and Guo Si and Li Jue even thought about assassinating the emperor to take the throne, however was dissuaded from doing so by Fan Chou and Zhang Ji. With Li Jue as the leader of the rebels, the four took almost complete control of the court and demoted and promoted anyone at will.

When the western forces of Han Sui, Ma Teng and Liu Yan formed an alliance to challenge the Han central government controlled by the four, Li Jue sent his nephew Li Li (李利), Guo Si and Fan Chou to counter the allied forces. The allied forces suffered a major defeat with casualties numbering up to 10,000 at a location about 13 miles west of Chang'an. Knowing the allied forces were low on supplies, Li Li ordered Fan Chou to pursue and wipe the enemy out, but Fan Chou refused because of his friendship with Han Sui. Li Li later reported this incident to Li Jue upon returning to Chang'an. Li Jue then assembled the officers for a banquet, wherein he openly executed Fan Chou for betrayal and causing the Liang Province officers to distrust him.

At the time, Guo Si's jealous wife, Lady Qiong, became suspicious that her husband was having an affair with one of Li Jue's concubines so she decided to prevent her husband from attending Li Jue's banquets. She poisoned the gifts of food that Li Jue had given to them and convinced her husband that he should not be so trusting of Li Jue. Later, Guo Si became very drunk at another one of Li Jue's banquets and suddenly convinced himself that he was poisoned. He ingested liquid feces to force himself to vomit, which greatly offended Li Jue and drove the two leaders to battle. The situation ended up with Li Jue kidnapping Emperor Xian and Guo Si kidnapping the emperor's ministers.

== Downfall and death ==
However, the situation was totally out of control: there were several tens of battles fought everyday in the alleys or market at its peak. The frequent battles had made Chang'an untenable for its inhabitants. Therefore, Emperor Xian asked Jia Xu to request a truce between Guo Si and Li Jue, who listened to Jia Xu and temporarily ceased fighting.

Taking advantage of the chaos and massive confusion caused by the civil war between Li Jue and Guo Si, Emperor Xian sneaked out of Chang'an and was rescued by the former leader of the White Wave Bandits, Yang Feng. Yang Feng, along with Dong Cheng, Yang Ding and Xu Huang, defeated Guo Si, who had led his troops in pursuit of the emperor. Guo Si returned to Li Jue to make a last-ditch effort to recapture Emperor Xian. Li Jue and Guo Si gained initial success by defeating Yang Ding, but were driven back by Yang Feng and Dong Cheng. Since then, Guo Si returned to Mei County and never took further action to retrieve the emperor, while Li Jue occupied Chang'an.

Cao Cao became the next hegemonist to seize control of Emperor Xian as Dong Zhuo, Li Jue and Guo Si had done before him. The power of Li Jue and Guo Si had greatly diminished resulting from previous infighting and the loss of Emperor Xian. Guo Si was eventually slain by his subordinate Wu Xi (伍習), who led his remnants to join Li Jue in 197.

== See also ==
- Lists of people of the Three Kingdoms
