= Li Jue (Han dynasty) =

Chinese military general (died 198)

- 李傕
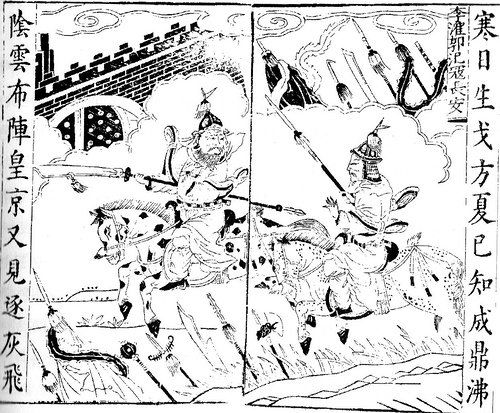
- After Dong Zhuo's death, Guo Si and Li Jue sacked the Han capital at Chang'an. This is a Qing dynasty illustration depicting the attack.

Grand Marshal (大司馬)
- In office 195–198
- Monarch: Emperor Xian of Han

General of Chariots and Cavalry (車騎將軍)
- In office 192–195
- Monarch: Emperor Xian of Han

Colonel-Director of Retainers (司隸校尉)
- In office 192–195
- Monarch: Emperor Xian of Han

Personal details
- Born: Unknown Fuping County, Shaanxi
- Died: 198
- Children: Li Shi; one unnamed daughter
- Occupation: Military general, politician, warlord
- Courtesy name: Zhiran (稚然)
- Peerage: Marquis of Chiyang (池陽侯)

Li Jue (died May or June 198), courtesy name Zhiran, was a Chinese military general, politician, and warlord serving under the autocratic warlord Dong Zhuo during the late Eastern Han dynasty of China. He later succeeded Dong Zhuo as the leader of the Liang Province faction after Dong Zhuo was murdered in a coup d'état, and was able to take over the Han imperial capital Chang'an, keeping Emperor Xian as a hostage. Despite being adept in military affairs, he was inept at politics, quarrelling with his fellow generals and making the bad decision to let Emperor Xian escape, greatly decreasing his power and precipitating his downfall.

== Service under Dong Zhuo ==
Originating from Beidi Commandery of Liang Province, Li Jue entered Dong Zhuo's Liang Province army as one of the earliest recruits. In helping Dong Zhuo in his many campaigns, including the suppression of the Yellow Turban Rebellion, the Liang Province Rebellion, and the war with the coalition against Dong Zhuo, Li Jue had earned himself a military reputation.

After Dong Zhuo relocated the capital from Luoyang to Chang'an, Li Jue, along Guo Si and Zhang Ji, were sent to the frontline against the eastern warlords. At the time the alliance had been having internal conflicts, and would not unite in fighting Dong Zhuo; as a result, a senior imperial officer, Zhu Jun, could only ask his old friend, Tao Qian, to give him a hand in a futile effort to fight the pillaging forces under Li Jue. Tao Qian, despite having a general alliance with Dong Zhuo, indeed sent 3,000 elite Danyang troops to Zhu Jun to battle Guo Si and Li Jue at Zhongmu County, where Zhu Jun's force was totally crushed. Li Jue and his comrades then performed raids around Chenliu and Yingchuan commanderies, wherein the defenders, Cao Cao and Xiahou Yuan (Administrator of Chenliu) were also unable to stop them. Many residents there were hijacked and enslaved by Li Jue's forces.

== Battle of Chang'an ==
Before Li Jue could return to the capital, Dong Zhuo was assassinated by Lü Bu in a plot orchestrated by Wang Yun, and the Liang Province faction inside Chang'an yielded to Lü Bu and Wang Yun. Li Jue and his comrades Fan Chou, Guo Si and Zhang Ji implored Wang Yun to show mercy, but the latter only granted amnesty to Dong Zhuo's other subordinates because Li Jue and his comrades were the closest aides to Dong Zhuo. Therefore, the four planned to relinquish their positions and go into hiding. However, Li Jue's chief adviser Jia Xu suggested that they should take this opportunity to launch a strike at Chang'an since the regime was unstable after the coup. The four then roused several thousand hardcore followers to attack Chang'an. Wang Yun had sent Xu Rong and Hu Zhen (former members of the Liang Province faction) to fight the Liang Province forces en route, but Xu Rong was killed in the first encounter while Hu Zhen led his troops to join the rebels, inflating the size of the rebel force. Along the way, Liang Province residents joined the rebels' course, and the expedition force burgeoned to over 100,000 when they surrounded the capital. Lü Bu attempted to break the siege, but was forced back inside the city gate despite him seriously wounding Guo Si in a duel. After eight days of sieging, Shu troops within Lü Bu's army rebelled and opened the gates for Li Jue's faction. After entering Chang'an, the rebel troops looted the city, killing more than 10,000 people in the process. While Lü Bu managed to escape, Wang Yun remained; Wang was eventually forced to surrender himself to the rebels and was killed a few days later.

== Controlling the emperor ==
Li Jue's forces usurped imperial power by taking Emperor Xian hostage. The four demanded high ranks and even thought about assassinating the emperor to take the throne, but Jia Xu dissuaded them from doing so. With Li Jue as the leader of the Liang Province army, the four took the mace for the court, demoting and promoting anyone they saw fit. People who allied themselves with them, like Liu Biao, Yuan Shu and Li Ru, were all promoted by them. Li Ru also forced the emperor to appoint him as General of Chariots and Cavalry and Colonel-Director of Retainers, give him the ceremonial axe of military authority, and enfeoff him as the Marquis of Chiyang. When Li Jue's power was at its height, even Cao Cao sent emissaries to pay tribute as a token of goodwill.

In April 194, a nominal vassal and local warlord, Ma Teng, requested some private provisions from the Han imperial court but was refused. He then initiated a rebellion in Mei County. An imperial emissary from Emperor Xian was sent to broker peace, but to no avail. Then, Ma Teng's close friend and comrade, Han Sui, was sent to dissuade Ma Teng with an armed force. Once Han Sui arrived at Mei County, however, he joined forces with Ma Teng, and secretly contacted Liu Yan's spies implanted in the court. Liu Yan's cohorts were discovered before they could make a move, but they succeeded in escaping the city and entering Ma Teng's camp. Li Jue sent his nephew Li Li, Guo Si and Fan Chou to counter the allied force. They dealt a major defeat to the allied force about 13 miles west to Chang'an, inflicting casualties of over 10,000. Knowing the allied force was low on grain, Li Li asked Fan Chou to pursue and wipe the enemy out, but Fan Chou refused because of his friendship with Han Sui. Li Li reported this incident to Li Jue upon the army's return. On 2 March 195, Li Jue threw his officers a banquet, and had Fan Chou openly executed during the revelry.

=== Quarrel with Guo Si ===
After the murder of Fan Chou, the Liang Province generals became quite suspicious of Li Jue, but the regime under Li Jue remained unchallenged for some time, wherein Emperor Xian was anxiously waiting for someone capable to get rid of his regents. Eventually, Guo Si's jealous wife became suspicious that her husband was having an affair with one of Li Jue's concubines so she decided to prevent her husband from attending Li Jue's banquets. She poisoned the gifts of food that Li Jue had given to them and convinced her husband that he should not be so trusting of Li Jue. Later, Guo Si became very drunk at another one of Li Jue's banquets and suddenly convinced himself that he was poisoned. He ingested liquid feces to force himself to vomit, which greatly offended Li Jue and drove the two leaders to battle. Battles inside the imperial city of Chang'an were fought every day. Finally, on 22 April 195, Li Jue kidnapped the emperor while Guo Si kidnapped court officials.

The situation deteriorated with each passing day, and had descended into full-blown civil war. There were several tens of battles fought per day in the alleys or market at its peak, on one occasion the emperor's own tent being caught in the crossfire. The frequent battles had rendered Chang'an untenable for its inhabitants. But at the same time, the turmoil provided Emperor Xian with an excuse to ask Li Jue and Guo Si to let him go back to Luoyang, under the provisions that Li Jue could have Chang'an while Guo Si and other generals could follow the emperor to the dilapidated Luoyang. Jia Xu brought the two an imperial edict, and requested a truce between Li Jue and Guo Si, and the duo temporarily ceased fire upon Jia Xu's persuasion.

=== Downfall ===
After Jia Xu and Zhang Ji pleaded Li Jue and Guo Si to stop fighting, Guo Si started to move eastward with the emperor. However, on the journey to Luoyang, there were internal disputes, providing general Yang Feng with an opportunity to rescue the emperor. Aided by Dong Cheng and Xu Huang, Yang Feng defeated Guo Si and seized Emperor Xian. Guo Si returned to Li Jue and convinced the latter to make a last-ditch effort to recapture the emperor. When they caught up with the imperial train, Li Jue and Guo Si were defeated by Yang Feng, who had gained support from the White Wave Bandits. However, Yang Feng and the imperial retinue were running out of food, to the point that some court officials had to dig tree roots out from the earth as food. Thus, Emperor Xian sent emissaries to the various warlords, still nominal vassals of his, asking for help; however only a few of them replied with actual assistance. Zhang Yang, one of the warlords who received the edict, quickly sent his staff to support the emperor with supplies, and the forces of Li Jue and Guo Si were defeated in a decisive battle.

Guo Si retreated to Mei County thereafter, and was later murdered by one of his commanders, who brought his remaining troops to Li Jue in Chang'an. In April 198, the warlord who now controlled the emperor, Cao Cao, sent envoys to incite the western warlords to attack Chang'an, Li Jue's home base. One of Li Jue's subordinates, Duan Wei (段煨), mutinied and killed Li Jue along with his family in the summer of 198. Duan Wei sent Li Jue's head to Xu city (as a sign of his submission to Cao Cao).

== See also ==
- Lists of people of the Three Kingdoms
