= Wang Yun (Han dynasty) =

Han dynasty politician and official (137-192)

- 王允
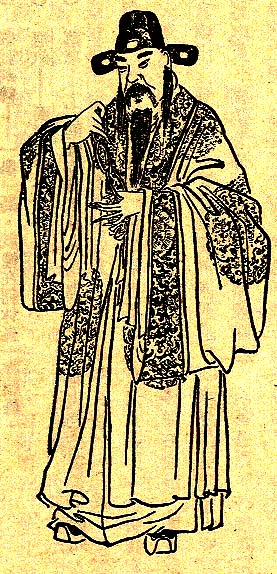
- A Qing dynasty illustration of Wang Yun

Manager of the Affairs of the Masters of Writing (錄尚書事)
- In office 192
- Monarch: Emperor Xian of Han

Minister over the Masses (司徒)
- In office 190–192
- Monarch: Emperor Xian of Han

Prefect of the Masters of Writing (尚書令)
- In office 189–192
- Monarch: Emperor Xian of Han

Minister Coachman (太僕)
- In office 189
- Monarch: Emperor Xian of Han

Intendant of Henan (河南尹)
- In office 189
- Monarch: Emperor Shao of Han

Inspector of Yu Province (豫州刺史)
- In office 184–?
- Monarch: Emperor Ling of Han

Personal details
- Born: 137 Qi County, Shanxi
- Died: 192 (aged 55) Xi'an, Shaanxi
- Relations: Wang Hong (brother); Wang Chen (nephew); Wang Ling (nephew); Linghu Yu's mother (niece); Guo Huai's wife (niece)
- Children: Wang Gai; Wang Jing; Wang Ding
- Occupation: Politician
- Courtesy name: Zishi (子师)

Wang Yun (Chinese: 王允;; 137–4 July 192 (Note: According to Liu Xie's biography in Book of the Later Han, Wang Yun was killed on the jiazi day of the 6th month of the 3rd year of the Chuping era of his reign. This corresponds to 4 Jul 192 on the Julian calendar. Wang Yun's biography in the same work recorded that he was 56 (by East Asian reckoning) when he died.)), courtesy name Zishi, was a Chinese politician who lived during the late Eastern Han dynasty. He served in the Han government through the reigns of three emperors – Emperor Ling (r. 168–189), Emperor Shao (r. 189) and Emperor Xian (r. 189–220). The highest offices he served in were Manager of the Affairs of the Masters of Writing and Minister over the Masses in the early reign of Emperor Xian. In 192, with help from the general Lü Bu and others, he plotted a successful coup in Chang'an against Dong Zhuo, a tyrannical warlord and regent who controlled the Han central government, and assassinated him. However, later that year, Dong Zhuo's followers staged a counter-coup and seized back control of the central government in Chang'an. Wang Yun and his family members were captured and executed.

In the 14th-century historical novel Romance of the Three Kingdoms, Wang Yun was the adoptive father of the fictional maiden Diaochan, whom he used to stir up conflict between Lü Bu and Dong Zhuo, causing the former to betray and assassinate the latter.

== Life ==
According to the New Book of Tang, Wang Yun was a descendant of Qin general Wang Ben.

According to Book of the Later Han, Wang Yun was from Qi County, Taiyuan. His family is a local clan and had many members who had served as administrative officials in the regional government for generations. When Wang was young, Guo Tai, who was from the same commandery, met him and was impressed by him. Guo then commented that Wang was capable of great improvement and was a talent who could assist kings. (Note: Guo Tai has a biography in vol.68 of Houhanshu, and his courtesy name is Linzong (林宗); he died in the spring of 169 at the age of 42 (by East Asian reckoning). Fan Ye's (author of the Houhanshu) father's name was Tai (泰); to avoid naming taboo, the Book of the Later Han used "太" to refer to Guo Linzong; Guo's biography also consistently used his courtesy name to refer to him. In his annotation to Houhanshu, Li Xian noted that Zheng Tai (courtesy name Gongye [公业], and has a biography in vol.70) received the same treatment.) In c.155, Wang Yun himself became a minor commandery official at the age of 19 (by East Asian reckoning) during the reign of Emperor Huan. During this time, an eunuch, Zhao Jin (赵津; who hailed from Jinyang), was terrorizing his county. Wang Yun then arrested and killed Zhao Jin. Zhao's brothers then bribed the eunuchs around Emperor Huan to malign Wang. Angered, Emperor Huan then ordered Liu Zan (刘瓒), then Administrator of Taiyuan, to be imprisoned; Liu later died in prison. Wang Yun then escorted Liu's body to the latter's hometown of Pingyuan, and observed a mourning period of three years before returning to his hometown.

In 184, with the outbreak of the Yellow Turban Rebellion, Wang became the Inspector of Yu Province (豫州刺史). However, later he failed in the power struggle with the eunuch Zhang Rang. He had to abandon his position and hide himself in the countryside. After the death of Emperor Ling, the general He Jin came into power, and Wang Yun was promoted to the Gentleman of the Household and later to the Intendant of Henan (河南尹).

In 189, the capital Luoyang fell into chaos following the death of He Jin and a bloody clash between the powerful Ten Attendants and government officials. Dong Zhuo, a warlord from Liang Province (凉州) managed to take control of the situation and eventually placed a puppet emperor on the throne. At the time, Wang Yun held the positions of the Minister over the Masses (司徒), replacing Yang Biao, and the Prefect of the Masters of Writing (尚書令).

Dong Zhuo's subsequent tyrannical and cruel behaviour aroused the wrath of many. Wang Yun colluded with several other officials in a plot to assassinate Dong Zhuo. The plan received a huge boost when the conspirators managed to recruit the help of Lü Bu, a formidable warrior serving as a general under Dong Zhuo. Bringing along a dozen men, Lü Bu cornered Dong Zhuo outside the palace gate and slew him.

After the death of Dong Zhuo, rumours spread that Wang Yun, now the de facto head of the Han central government, wanted to purge and execute all of Dong Zhuo's former subordinates who were from Liang Province. When Wang Yun refused to grant amnesty to four of Dong Zhuo's former subordinates, they took up arms under the leadership of Li Jue and Guo Si, who led them to attack Chang'an. Li Jue and Guo Si defeated the Han imperial forces guarding Chang'an and occupied the capital. While Lü Bu was planning to flee Chang'an before the city fell, he asked Wang Yun to escape together with him. However, Wang Yun refused to abandon Emperor Xian and remained behind. Li Jue and Guo Si's forces captured him and killed him along with his family. Some of Wang Yun's relatives managed to escape and survive; one of them was Wang Ling, a nephew of Wang Yun, who later became a general in the state of Cao Wei during the Three Kingdoms period.

== In Romance of the Three Kingdoms ==
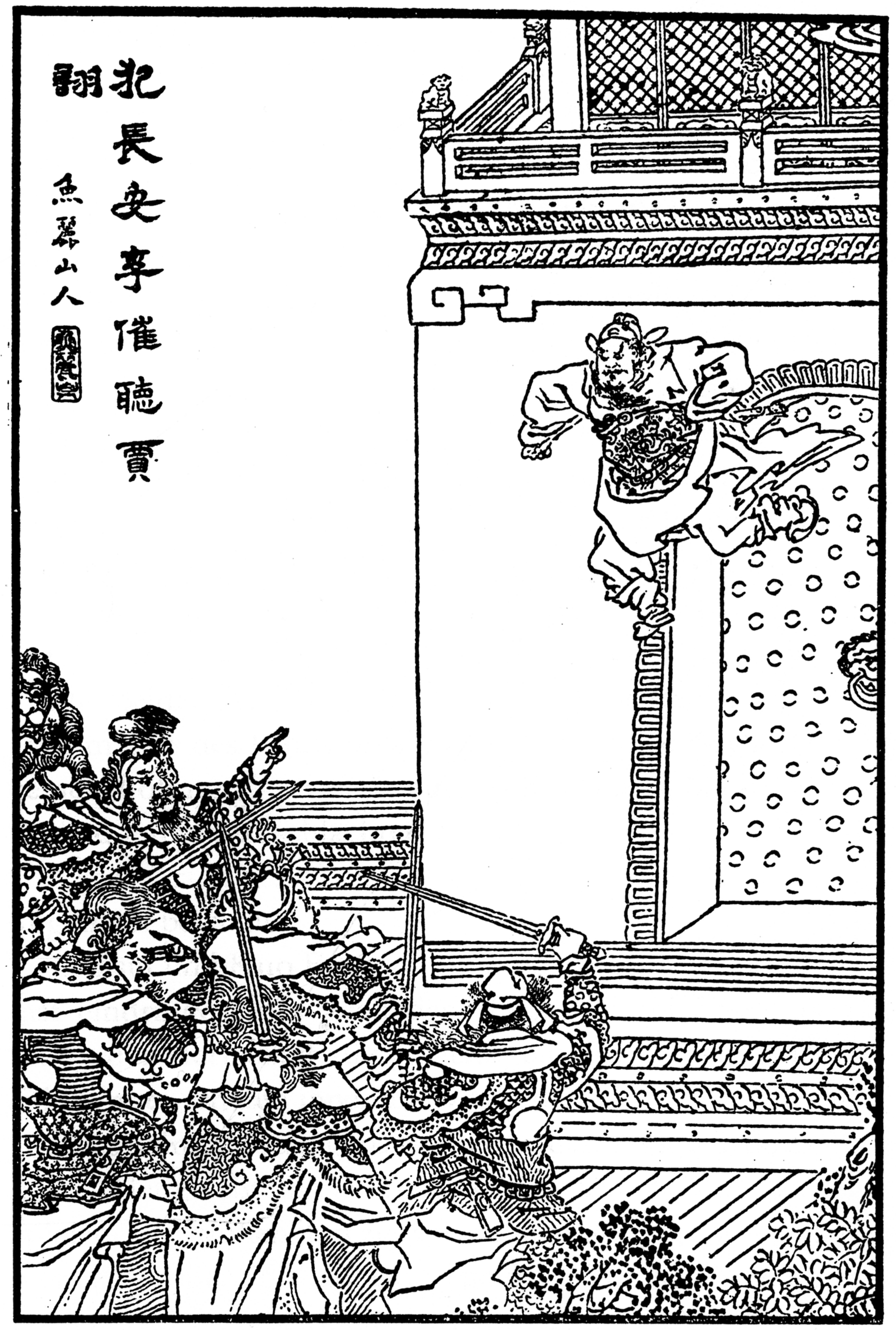
Wang Yun commits suicide in front of Li Jue and Guo Si. Print from a Qing dynasty edition of the novel Romance of the Three Kingdoms.

Wang Yun appears as a character in two chapters of the 14th-century historical novel Romance of the Three Kingdoms, which romanticises the events in the late Eastern Han dynasty and Three Kingdoms period of China. In the novel, Wang Yun devised an elaborate plot to eliminate Dong Zhuo. It involved two of the Thirty-Six Stratagems: Beauty Trap and Chain Stratagems.

In Chapter 8, Wang Yun was thinking about how to get rid of Dong Zhuo when he encountered Diaochan, a singer in his household whom he had been treating like his daughter. An idea struck him: Make use of Diaochan to sow discord between Dong Zhuo and Lü Bu, and instigate Lü Bu to assassinate Dong Zhuo. He then invited Lü Bu and Dong Zhuo to his residence for a party on two occasions. On both occasions, he asked Diaochan to perform for the guest and catch his attention. He initially promised to marry Diaochan to Lü Bu; later, he let Dong Zhuo bring Diaochan home. When Lü Bu found out, he suspected that Dong Zhuo had seized Diaochan for himself and became very angry. One day, while Dong Zhuo was out, Lü Bu sneaked into his room to meet Diaochan. She wept and pleaded with him to save her from Dong Zhuo. In the meantime, Dong Zhuo had returned and he saw Lü Bu embracing Diaochan. He was so furious that he threw a ji at Lü Bu which narrowly missed him as he fled. After calming down, Dong Zhuo spoke to Diaochan and asked if she was willing to marry Lü Bu, but she said she would rather die and attempted suicide. Dong Zhuo then believed her.

In Chapter 9, as Lü Bu became increasingly resentful of Dong Zhuo, Wang Yun used the opportunity to instigate and incite Lü Bu to turn against Dong Zhuo. Wang Yun managed to convince Lü Bu to kill Dong Zhuo, and then set up an ambush near the palace gates. He then lied to Dong Zhuo, saying that Emperor Xian wanted to abdicate his throne to him, and lured Dong Zhuo into the ambush, where he met his end at Lü Bu's hands. Later in Chapter 9, when Chang'an was surrounded by Li Jue and Guo Si's forces, Wang Yun made them promise to not harm Emperor Xian and then committed suicide in front of them by jumping off the viewing platform above the city gates.

== See also ==
- Lists of people of the Three Kingdoms
