= Dong Zhuo =

2nd-century Chinese military general and warlord

- 董卓
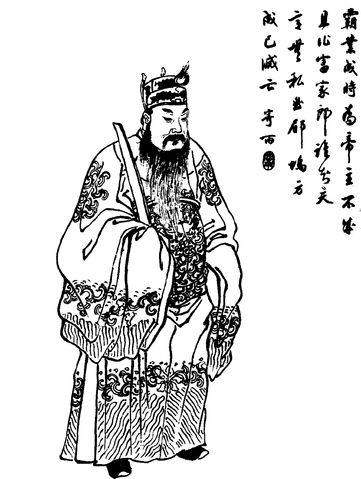
- A Qing dynasty illustration of Dong Zhuo

Grand Preceptor (太師)
- In office 189 – 192
- Monarch: Emperor Xian of Han

Chancellor of State (相國)
- In office 189
- Monarch: Emperor Xian of Han

General of the Vanguard (前將軍)
- In office 188–189
- Monarchs: Emperor Ling of Han / Emperor Shao of Han

Personal details
- Born: 140s Min County, Gansu
- Died: 22 May 192 Xi'an, Shaanxi
- Children: Niu Fu's wife; at least two sons
- Parents: Dong Junya (father); Lady of Chiyang (mother)
- Relatives: Dong Zhuó (brother); Dong Min (brother); Lü Bu (foster son); Dong Huang (nephew); Dong Bai (granddaughter); at least one grandson
- Occupation: Military general, politician, warlord
- Courtesy name: Zhongying (仲穎)
- Peerage: Marquis of Mei (郿侯)

Military service
- Allegiance: Han Empire; Dong Zhuo's regime
- Unit: Dong Zhuo's forces Han Imperial Forces
- Battles/wars: Liang Province Rebellion; Massacre of the Eunuchs; Campaign against Dong Zhuo

Dong Zhuo
- Chinese: 董卓
Transcriptions
Standard Mandarin
- Hanyu Pinyin: Dǒng Zhuó
- Gwoyeu Romatzyh: Doong Jwo
- Wade–Giles: Tung^{3} Cho^{2}
- IPA: [tʊ̀ŋ ʈʂwǒ]
Yue: Cantonese
- Yale Romanization: Dúng Cheuk
- Jyutping: Dung^{2} Coek^{3}
- IPA: [tʊŋ˧˥ tsʰœk̚˧]
Southern Min
- Tâi-lô: Táng Toh
Middle Chinese
- Middle Chinese: túwng ʈæwk

Dong Zhuo (c. 140s – 22 May 192), courtesy name Zhongying, (Note: The 14th-century historical novel Romance of the Three Kingdoms uses Zhongjiong (仲顈) as his courtesy name.) was a Chinese military general, politician and warlord who lived in the late Eastern Han dynasty. At the end of the reign of the Eastern Han, Dong Zhuo was a general and powerful minister of the imperial government. Originally from Liang Province, Dong Zhuo seized control of the imperial capital Luoyang in 189 when it entered a state of turmoil following the death of Emperor Ling of Han and a massacre of the eunuch faction by the court officials.

Dong Zhuo subsequently deposed Liu Bian (Emperor Shao) and replaced him with his half-brother, the puppet Emperor Xian, to make him become the de facto ruler of China in the boy-emperor's name. The Eastern Han dynasty regime survived in name only. Dong Zhuo's rule was brief and characterized by cruelty and tyranny. In the following year, a coalition of regional officials (刺史; cishi) and warlords launched a campaign against him. Failing to stop the coalition forces, Dong Zhuo sacked Luoyang and relocated further west to the former Western Han capital at Chang'an (modern Xi'an, Shaanxi province). He was assassinated soon after in May 192 by his subordinate Lü Bu in a plot orchestrated by Interior Minister Wang Yun.

His death is seen as a destabilizing event in the collapse of the Eastern Han dynasty, and a precursor to the Wars of the Three Kingdoms.

== Early life ==
Dong Zhuo was born in Lintao, Longxi Commandery in the early 140s and was said to be a chivalrous youth who was physically strong and excelled in horseback archery. He travelled around the Qiang and Xiongnu regions and befriended many people.

Around 165, Dong Zhuo became a member of the Yulin corps (羽林郎, branch of the Imperial Guard) in the capital. Dong served under Zhang Huan's (张奂) northern campaign to suppress an uprising of the Qiang. (Note: Zhang Huan's biography in Book of the Later Han (Houhanshu) recorded that he sent Dong on an expedition in or shortly after the winter of the 1st year of the Yongkang era of the reign of Emperor Huan of Han; the 10th to 12th months of that year correspond to 31 Oct 167 to 27 Jan 168 in the Julian calendar. Emperor Huan himself died in Jan 168.) He eventually became a county magistrate in the Yanmen Commandery, a divisional commandant in the Shu Commandery, the Wu and Ji colonel in the Western Regions, inspector of Bing Province, (Note: Per vol.57 of Zizhi Tongjian and Cai Yong's biography in Houhanshu, in 178, Cai Yong was exiled to Shuofang, then part of Bingzhou. Cai's enemy Yang Qiu first hired assassins to kill Cai; when the assassins refused to do so, Yang bribed the buzhu of the area to poison Cai. Instead, this buzhu warned Cai and so Cai survived. It is possible that this buzhu was Dong Zhuo.) and administrator of the Hedong Commandery.

At some point in the 170s, he was employed as a minor official in an unnamed commandery, supervising captured thieves and robbers. Due to the many raids by non-Han minorities, the then-Inspector of Liangzhou, Cheng Jiu (成就), promoted Dong to serve under him. Under Cheng, Dong led troops to repel these raids and achieved much success. As such, the then-Inspector of Bingzhou, Duan Jiong (段颎), recommended Dong to the Three Excellencies of the time; then-Situ Yuan Wei (袁隗) hired Dong to serve under him. (Note: According to Emperor Ling's biography in Book of the Later Han, Yuan Wei first became situ in the 12th month of the 1st year of the Xi'ping era (2 to 31 Jan 173 in the Julian calendar) and was relieved of the post on the ren'wu day of the 10th month of the 5th year of the Xi'ping era (13 Dec 176 in the Julian calendar). The same volume also recorded that he again became situ in the 4th month of the 5th year of the Guang'he era (21 May to 18 Jun 182 in the Julian calendar) and was relieved of the post sometime in the 2nd month of the 2nd year of the Zhong'ping era (11 to 17 Apr 185 in the Julian calendar, with 11 Apr being the gui'hai day of the 2nd month). Also, Duan Jiong died in 179 as he was implicated in a case involving Wang Fu. Thus, it is more likely that Yuan Wei took Dong under his wing during his first tenure as situ. The record in Wu Shu of Duan Jiong being Inspector of Bingzhou could be erroneous; according to Duan's biography in Houhanshu, Duan was Inspector of Bingzhou in the 160s.)

By the late 170s, Dong Zhuo was Administrator of Hedong Commandery. (Note: Dong Zhuo's biographies in both Sanguozhi and Houhanshu recorded this post, but did not indicate further details. Dong was probably in this post by the 170s; the Annals of the Later Han by Yuan Hong recorded that Dong was Administrator of Hedong Commandery when Zhang Huan was imprisoned there as part of the second Disaster of the Partisan Prohibitions. Since Zhang died in 181, this anecdote must have taken place in the late 170s. This anecdote was also recorded in Zhang's biography in Houhanshu, but did not indicate Dong's post.)

At the outbreak of the Yellow Turban Rebellion in the summer of 184, Dong Zhuo was sent to take over command from Lu Zhi in preparation of the offense on Zhang Jue in Julu. Although his efforts during the rebellion were initially unsuccessful, with the arrival of Huangfu Song, victory was achieved in the winter against the peasants.

During the Liang Province Rebellion, the barbarians rebelled with local gentries Han Sui and Bian Zhang. Dong was reinstated and sent to suppress the rebels. While suppressing this rebellion, Dong Zhuo had several tactical and strategic disagreements with Huangfu Song; after Huangfu managed to achieve victory despite Dong's disagreements, Dong became resentful and fearful of him.

Dong Zhuo was given the title "General Who Smashes the Caitiffs" in 185, and "General of the Vanguard" in 188. He was promoted to be the governor of Bing Province, but he refused to take up his new post as he was unwilling to leave his men.

During the turbulent situation, the power of the Eastern Han dynasty was waning. Dong Zhuo then settled in Liang Province and built up his power.

== Rise to power ==
Following the death of Emperor Ling of Han in May 189, General-in-Chief He Jin ordered Dong Zhuo to lead troops into Luoyang to aid him in eliminating the powerful eunuch faction known as the Ten Attendants. Before Dong could arrive, He Jin was assassinated by the eunuchs in September that year and the capital city fell into a state of turmoil. The eunuchs took Liu Bian (Emperor Shao) hostage and fled from Luoyang. Dong Zhuo's army intercepted the eunuchs and brought the emperor back to the palace. (Note: Yuan Shao's biographies in Records of the Three Kingdoms and Book of the Later Han both mentioned that he was involved in He Jin's decision to summon Dong Zhuo. There is speculation that as Dong Zhuo had once served under Yuan Wei (Yuan Shao's uncle), it was actually on Yuan Wei's account that He agreed to summon Dong.)

After He Jin's death, He Jin's step-brother, General of Chariots and Cavalry He Miao (何苗), was killed by He Jin's subordinate Wu Kuang (吳匡) and Dong Zhuo's brother Dong Min, for sympathizing with the eunuch faction which had assassinated He Jin.

After arriving in Luoyang, Dong Zhuo realized that his 3000 men were unequal to the numerous troops guarding the capital. Dong ordered some of his army to march out at night and re-enter the city at dawn, thus making it appear that he was receiving reinforcements. Dong then took command of the leaderless forces of He Jin and He Miao, convinced Lü Bu to join his ranks, and made himself Excellency of Works.

In 189, Dong deposed Emperor Shao and replaced him with Liu Xie (Emperor Xian). Dong declared himself chancellor, and became the head of the imperial court in Luoyang. However, in the words of Rafe de Crespigny, Dong Zhuo's "conduct towards the court and the imperial officials was bullying, oppressive and frequently bloody." This prompted Yuan Shao to form a coalition army with other regional officials in opposition to Dong Zhuo's military authority.

== Coalition against Dong Zhuo ==
=== Dong Zhuo retreats to Chang'an ===
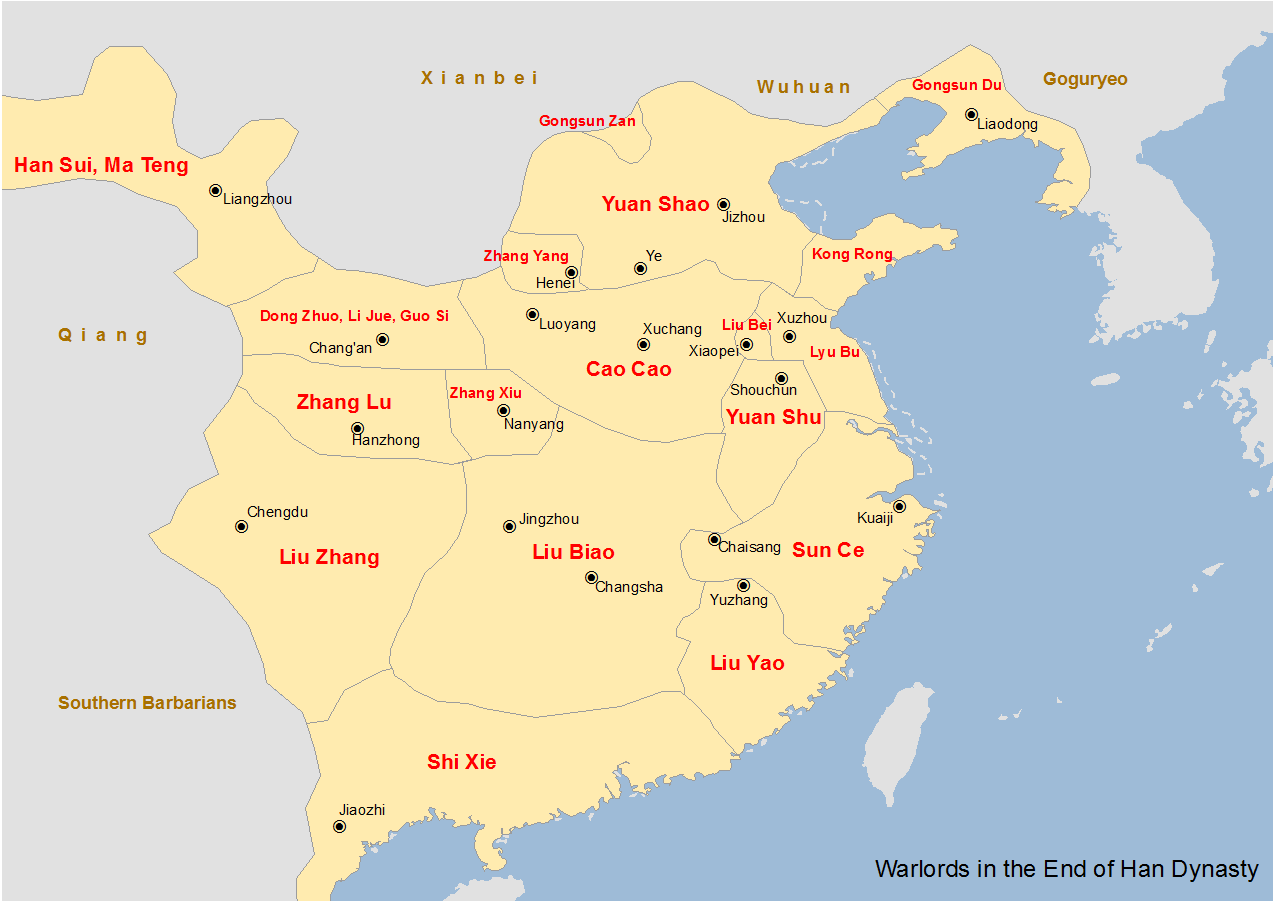
Map showing the major warlords of the Han dynasty in the 190s, including the territories controlled by Dong Zhuo and his subordinates Li Jue and Guo Si

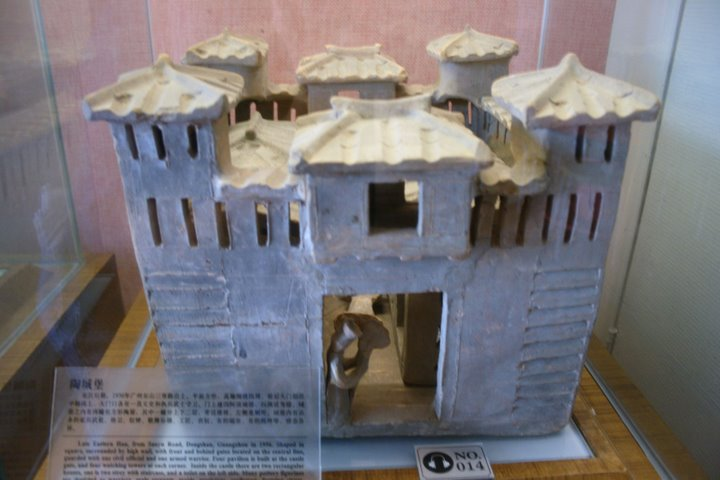
Ceramic model of a fortified manor of the Late Eastern Han dynasty.

In the same year, regional officials and warlords around the country formed a coalition force and launched a punitive campaign against Dong Zhuo. In response, he sent a detachment to intercept the coalition vanguard led by Sun Jian, and ordered his son-in-law, Niu Fu, to supply his fortress and manor of Mei, also known as "Meiwu" (郿坞) or Ten-Thousand Year Fortress (万岁坞), with 30 years' worth of rations, where he had planned to centralize his power or retire in safety behind its fortified walls built to be seven zhàng in height and thickness. After his subordinates Hua Xiong, Hu Zhen, and Lu Bu were defeated by Liu Bei, Zhang Fei and Guan Yu at Yangren, Dong Zhuo sent Li Jue to propose a marriage between Sun's son and Dong's daughter, and split the empire between the two families. Sun Jian refused and prepared to attack Luoyang.

Dong evacuated everyone in Luoyang and moved them to Chang'an in the west. Before the relocation, Dong ordered his troops to ransack the tombs of the late Han emperors for treasures, seize valuables from the wealthy residents in Luoyang, and burn down the palaces and anything that might be useful to the coalition.

Then the chancellor assembled his forces in the city and personally led them to ambush the approaching army. Dong's ambush failed and he was driven back by Sun Jian. He ordered Lu Bu to lead a cavalry force back to the city to halt Sun's progress before he took flight for Mianchi. Sun Jian broke through one of the eastern gates and defeated Lu Bu, taking the city.

=== Defeat of the coalition ===
Despite taking Luoyang, the city was so heavily damaged that Sun Jian chose to retreat rather than to try to hold it.

Dong Zhuo then sent his generals Li Jue, Guo Si, and Zhang Ji to the frontline against the eastern warlords. By this time the coalition had already fallen into disarray and internal bickering. The only ones who actively opposed Dong were the senior imperial officer, Zhu Jun and his old friend, Tao Qian. Tao, despite having a general alliance with Dong, sent 3,000 elite troops from Danyang to aid Zhu in the battle with Dong's forces at Zhongmu. Zhu was defeated. Li Jue and his comrades then raided the surrounding area around Chenliu and Yingchuan for slaves. Morale among the allied soldiers were low due to news of the ways in which Dong Zhuo would torture captives. Apparently he would have them tied up with fat-soaked clothes and start a fire from their foot. He left their heads unbound so he could enjoy their screams and watch their expressions while being tortured.

== Rule of terror ==
Two months after he moved the capital, Dong Zhuo revived the title of Grand Master, an antiquated title once reinvigorated by Wang Mang, but scrapped in the Eastern Han. He appointed his younger brother Dong Min as General of the Left and gave official posts to several of his kin.

Dong Zhuo threw lavish banquets during which he would torture captured enemies by severing limbs, removing tongues and eyeballs, or burning them alive. His audience was said to have experienced a high degree of discomfort.

For Yuan Shao's role as leader of the coalition against him, Dong Zhuo had the entire Yuan clan in Luoyang wiped out. Within two years, thousands of public servants were wrongly accused and executed, and numerous commoners were kidnapped or killed. In order to purchase materials for further development of the Mei citadel, he had bells and bronze statues, among which were nine of the Twelve Metal Colossi, melted and recast into coins. However, the coins did not weigh the same, resulting in all copper cash being devalued.

== Downfall and death ==
Dong Zhuo kept Lü Bu as a personal bodyguard and swore an oath as father and son. However, after an argument, Dong threw a hand-axe at Lü Bu, who dodged the weapon. Lü Bu's relationship with Dong Zhuo further deteriorated when Lü had an affair with a woman in Dong's harem.

In 192, with encouragement from Interior Minister Wang Yun, Lü Bu made his decision to kill Dong Zhuo. On the morning of May 22, 192, Lü greeted Dong at the palace gate with a dozen trusted men led by Cavalry Captain Li Su, who had pretended to stand guard at the gate alongside Wang Yun. Li stepped forward and tried to stab Dong with a ji, but Dong's body armour saved him. Dong cried out for Lü Bu to save him, but Lü merely answered, "This is an imperial order," after which he delivered a fatal blow to Dong.

It was recorded that Dong's corpse was left on the streets with a lit wick placed on his navel. The wick burned for several days on the fat of the corpse. It was said that the light from the flame could last for days. A special order stated that anyone who went forth to collect the body would be killed. However, three officials, including Cai Yong, still challenged the order and were executed. Meanwhile, all affiliates of the Dong clan, including Dong's 90-year-old mother, were put to death.

== Legacy ==
After Dong Zhuo's death, several of his loyalists, such as Li Jue, Guo Si, Zhang Ji and Fan Chou, escaped on the belief that their allegiance to him would be considered treason. Wang Yun, who had taken control of the government, heard their appeal for pardon and said, "Of all those who should be forgiven, they are the exceptions." The four then planned to relinquish their positions and go into hiding. However, an advisor named Jia Xu suggested they should take this opportunity to launch a strike at Chang'an since the Liang faction was practically unscathed. The four then roused several-thousand core followers to attack Chang'an. Wang sent Xu Rong and Hu Zhen (former members of the Liang faction) to fight the Liang force en route, but Xu was killed in the first encounter and Hu joined the rebels, inflating the size of their army to 100,000 when they surrounded the capital. Lü Bu attempted to break the siege, but was defeated outside the city gate, and thus Chang'an fell into the hands of Dong Zhuo's followers. Emperor Xian was taken hostage and power in the court fell into the hands of the Liang faction once again.

== Family ==
- Father: Dong Junya (died 181)
- Mother: Lady Dong (103–192), titled Lady of Chiyang, executed
- Elder brother: Dong Zhuó (董擢, note different character than his own), courtesy name Menggao (孟高), died early
- Younger brother: Dong Min (董旻; died 192), courtesy name Shuying (叔穎); After Dong Zhuo backed Emperor Xian, Dong Min was appointed to the rank of Left General. After Lü Bu killed Dong Zhuo, Dong Min was labeled an accomplice and executed, and his head was put on public display
- Nephew: Dong Huang (董璜; died 192) – born in Lintao County, Gansu, fathered by Dong Zhuó (董擢), executed
- Sons: Dong Zhuo had some infant sons who were enfeoffed and later presumably executed, and at least one son of his was born 171 but died earlier than 190
  - Granddaughter: Dong Bai (董白), born after 178, titled Lady of Weiyang. She was given her passage to adulthood ceremony and a grand title and lands at an unceremoniously young age despite a 50-year-old Zhu Jun's protests. For the grand ceremony, a platform was built to be five to six chi – about 116 or 139 centimetres (3 ft 10 in or 4 ft 7 in) in modern conversions – and she rode in a blue-covered golden carriage as thousands of soldiers marched behind her. Dong Huang was said to have given her the seal personally. Dong Bai was presumably executed.
  - Grandson: born 186, executed
- Daughter: married Niu Fu
- Foster Son: Lü Bu

== In Romance of the Three Kingdoms ==
Romance of the Three Kingdoms, a 14th-century historical novel by Luo Guanzhong, was a romanticization of the events that occurred before and during the Three Kingdoms era. Because the real-life Dong Zhuo was already much of a cruel and treacherous character, the novel probably could do little more to accentuate that treachery and cruelty. It did, however, on two occasions deviate from the history.

=== Dong Zhuo and the three sworn brothers ===
Dong Zhuo first appeared as early as late in Chapter 1. Being sent to quell the Yellow Turban Rebellion, Dong Zhuo was defeated by the rebel leader Zhang Jiao and the battle was turning into a rout.

The three newly sworn brothers, Liu Bei, Guan Yu and Zhang Fei, happened to be nearby. They then led their forces out to Dong Zhuo's rescue. Suddenly met with this new opposition, the rebels were swept off their feet and had to retreat.

After returning to camp, Dong Zhuo asked the three brothers what offices they currently held. And they replied that they held none. Dong Zhuo harrumphed and then ignored them. This angered Zhang Fei so much that he grabbed his sword and wanted to kill Dong Zhuo. He was however stopped by his two brothers, who suggested taking their service elsewhere. Thus was Dong Zhuo's life spared and the three brothers went their own way.

=== Dong Zhuo and Diaochan ===
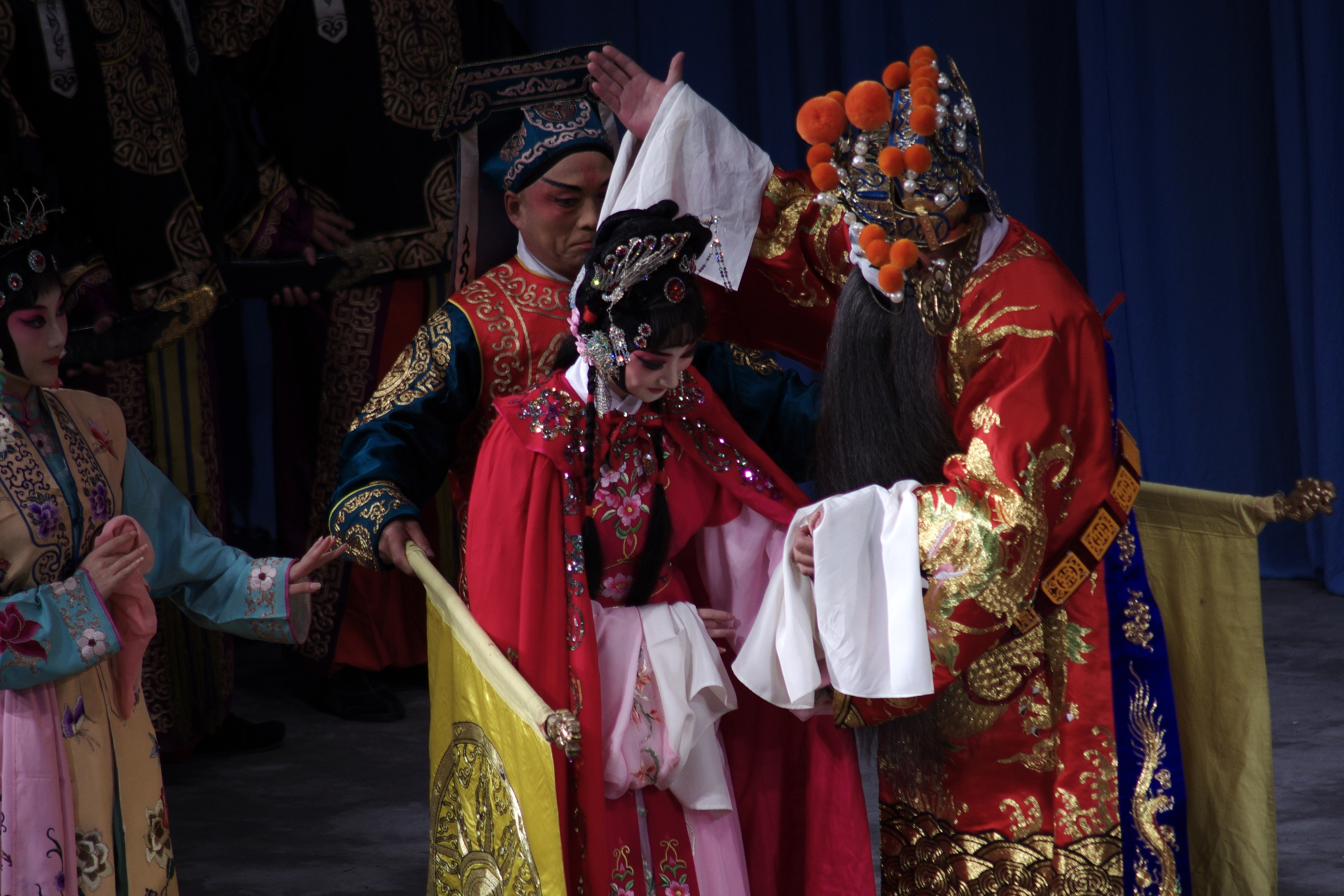
Dong Zhuo welcomes Diaochan to his home

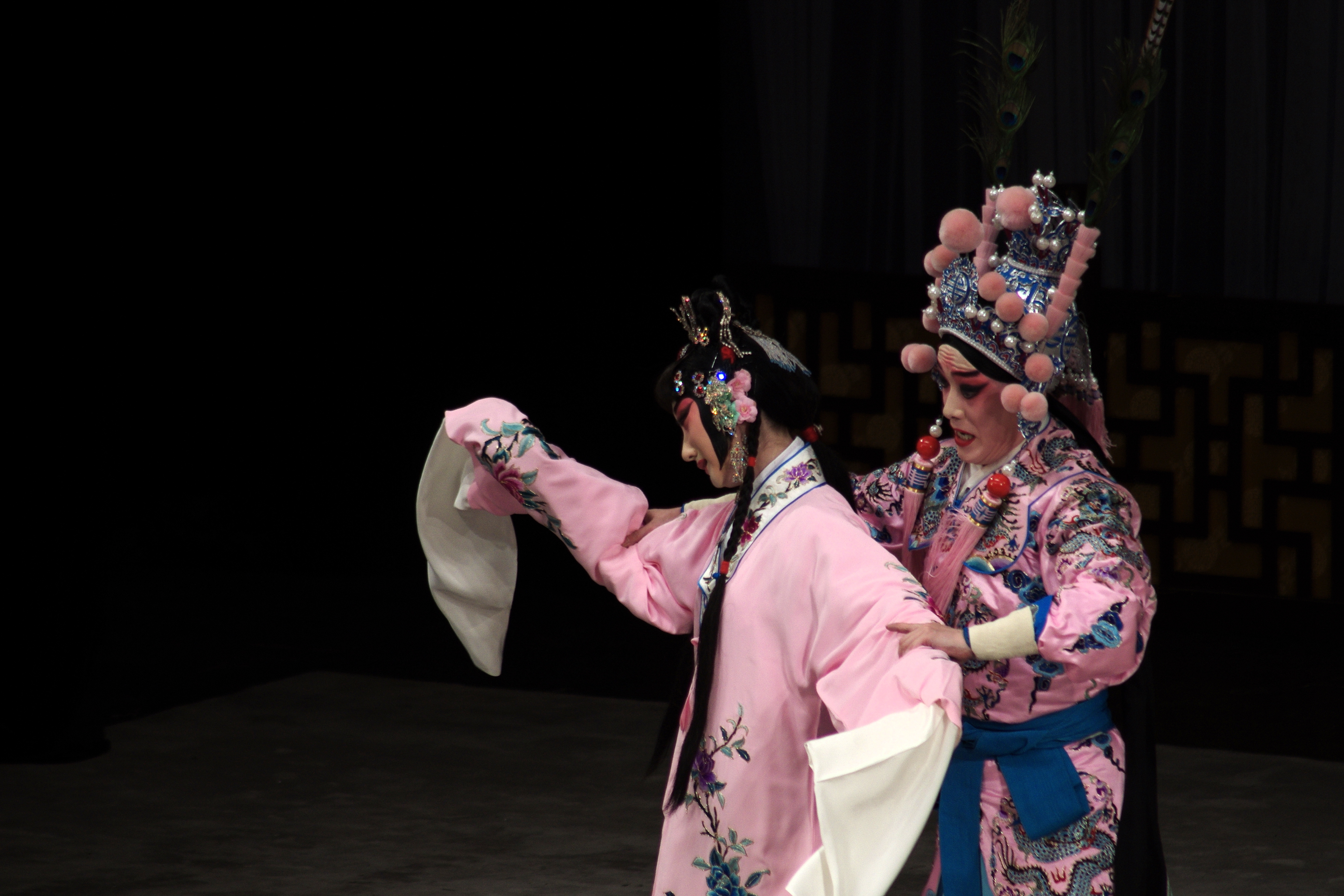
Diaochan complains to Lü Bu about Dong Zhuo

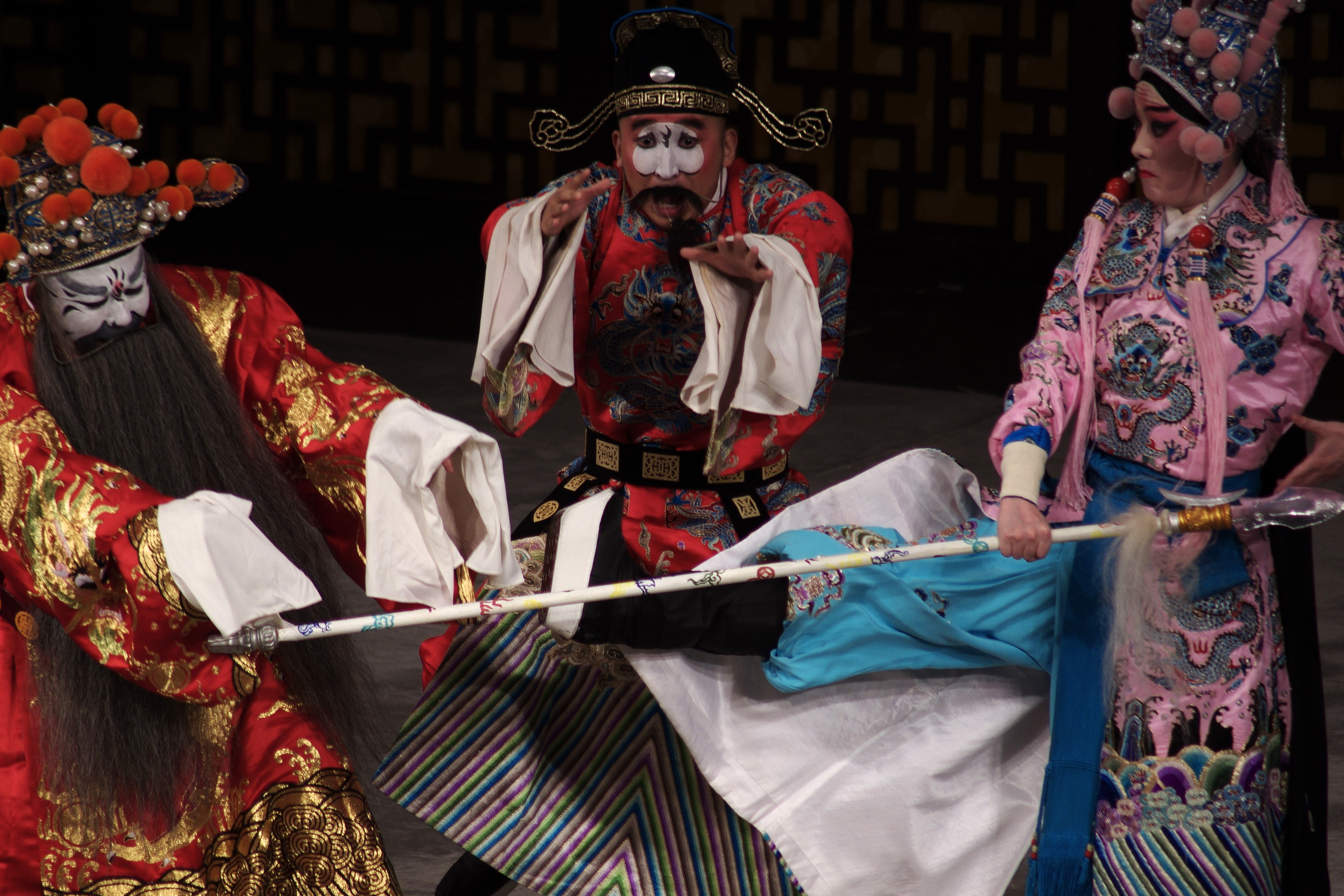
Li Ru tries to stop Lü Bu from killing Dong Zhuo

From a Peking opera performance by Shanghai Jingju Theatre Company on September 16, 2015, in Tianchan Theatre, Shanghai, China. In the Peking opera tradition, a Jing role with his face painted white indicates an evil character.

Perhaps the most popular story about Dong Zhuo was the fictional love triangle involving Dong Zhuo, Lü Bu and Diaochan, which eventually led to the death of Dong Zhuo at the hands of his own adoptive son, Lü Bu.

After Dong Zhuo moved the capital to the more strategically sound Chang'an, Interior Minister Wang Yun started to contemplate a plot to assassinate the tyrant by using the petite Diaochan, a young singer who was brought up in his household but whom he had been treating like his own daughter, to plant the seed of dissension between Dong Zhuo and Lü Bu.

Inviting Lü Bu over one night, Wang Yun asked Diaochan to serve wine to the guest. Lü Bu was immediately seized by the girl's beauty. Well aware of this, Wang Yun then promised to marry Diaochan to the mighty warrior.

A few days later, however, Wang Yun laid a feast for Dong Zhuo and repeated the feat. Like Lü Bu, Dong Zhuo could not lift his eyes off Diaochan, who also displayed her prowess in song and dance. Dong Zhuo then brought Diaochan home and made her his concubine.

When Lü Bu heard about this early the next morning, he headed for Dong Zhuo's bedroom and peeped in through the window. There he saw Diaochan sitting up grooming her hair while Dong Zhuo was still asleep. Aware of Lü Bu's presence, Diaochan put up a sorrowful expression and pretended to wipe tears off her eyes with a handkerchief.

A similar incident recurred about a month later, but this time Dong Zhuo woke up in time to see Lü Bu staring fixedly at Diaochan. Lü Bu was then thrown out and forbidden from entering the house.

Then one day, while Dong Zhuo was holding a conversation with Emperor Xian, Lü Bu sneaked to his foster father's residence and met with Diaochan in the Fengyi Pavilion (鳳儀亭). Weeping, Diaochan pleaded with Lü Bu to rescue her from Dong Zhuo. Placing his halberd aside, Lü Bu held Diaochan in his arms and comforted her with words.

Right then, Dong Zhuo returned to find the duo in the pavilion. The startled Lü Bu turned to flee. Dong Zhuo grabbed the halberd and gave chase. Being too slow, Dong Zhuo could not catch up with the agile Lü Bu. He then hurled the halberd at Lü Bu but the latter fended it off and got away.

After the incident, Lü Bu became increasingly displeased with Dong Zhuo. The displeasure was further inflamed by Wang Yun, who suggested subtly that Lü Bu kill Dong Zhuo. Lü Bu was eventually persuaded.

The conspirators sent Li Su to fetch Dong Zhuo from his castle in Meiwu (郿塢) under the pretense that the emperor intended to abdicate the throne to the warlord. The overjoyed Dong Zhuo then came to the palace gate, where his troops were barred from entering. As Dong Zhuo's carriage neared the palace building, soldiers loyal to Wang Yun escorted Dong Zhuo to the trap they set. Then suddenly a general stabbed Dong Zhuo.

Injured only in the arms, Dong Zhuo then cried out for Lü Bu to save him. Lü Bu walked over and impaled Dong Zhuo's throat with his halberd, proclaiming, "I have an imperial decree to slay the rebel!"

== In popular culture ==
=== Animation ===
- The character Toutaku Chuuei (Dong Zhuo Zhongying written in onyomi) of the anime short series, Ikki Tousen, is based roughly on Dong Zhuo.

=== Comics ===
- Dong Zhuo appears as a character in the Hong Kong manhua The Ravages of Time illustrated by Chan Mou.
- Dong Zhuo appears as a major antagonist in the manga series Sōten Kōro, which is loosely based on Romance of the Three Kingdoms.

=== Games ===
- Dong Zhuo is featured as a playable character in Koei's Dynasty Warriors, Romance of the Three Kingdoms, and Warriors Orochi video game series.
- In the collectible card game Magic: The Gathering there is a card named Dong Zhou, the Tyrant, in the Portal: Three Kingdoms set.
- Dong Zhuo is a major faction leader in the strategy game Total War: Three Kingdoms.

== See also ==
- Lists of people of the Three Kingdoms

== Notes ==
Preceded by	Chancellor of China; 189–192	Succeeded by Cao Cao
