= Qiao Mao =

Han dynasty official and warlord (died 190)

- 橋瑁

Administrator of Dong Commandery (東郡太守)
- In office ? – 190
- Monarch: Emperor Xian of Han
- Succeeded by: Wang Gong

Inspector of Yan Province (兗州刺史)
- In office ?–?
- Monarchs: Emperor Ling of Han / Emperor Xian of Han

Personal details
- Born: Unknown
- Died: 190
- Relations: Qiao Xuan (relative)
- Occupation: Official
- Courtesy name: Yuanwei (元偉)

Qiao Mao (died 190), courtesy name Yuanwei, was an official and minor warlord who lived during the late Eastern Han dynasty of China. In 190, he joined a coalition of warlords who launched a campaign against Dong Zhuo, a tyrannical warlord who controlled the Han central government and held Emperor Xian hostage. Later that year, he was killed after getting into a dispute with Liu Dai, one of the other warlords.

== Life ==
Qiao Mao was a relative of Qiao Xuan. He initially served as the Inspector (刺史) of Yan Province, and gained much prestige and respect during his tenure. Sometime before 189, he was appointed as the Administrator (太守) of Dong Commandery (around present-day Puyang, Henan). In 189, He Jin, the General-in-Chief (大將軍) who was serving as a regent for the underage Emperor Shao, secretly instructed Qiao Mao and three other regional officials – Dong Zhuo, Wang Kuang and Ding Yuan – to lead their forces into the vicinity of Luoyang, the imperial capital, and demand for the extermination of the eunuch faction in the imperial court. He Jin's plan was to pressure his half-sister, Empress Dowager He (Emperor Shao's mother), into agreeing to execute the eunuchs, who were at odds with his faction. The empress dowager did not yield.

In late 189, taking advantage of the power vacuum created in the aftermath of the conflict between He Jin's faction and the eunuch faction, Dong Zhuo led his forces into Luoyang and seized control over the central government. He subsequently deposed Emperor Shao and replaced him with his younger half-brother, who became historically known as Emperor Xian. Later that year, Qiao Mao forged a letter from the Three Ducal Ministers and sent it to all the regional warlords spread throughout the Han Empire. In the letter, he wrote about Dong Zhuo's tyranny and cruelty, and urged the warlords to rise up against Dong Zhuo and save Emperor Xian and the central government.

In the spring of 190, Qiao Mao and nine other warlords – Yuan Shu, Han Fu, Kong Zhou, Liu Dai, Wang Kuang, Yuan Shao, Zhang Miao, Yuan Yi and Bao Xin – formed a military coalition under Yuan Shao's leadership and launched a punitive campaign against Dong Zhuo. After the Battle of Xingyang in the middle of 190, Liu Dai killed Qiao Mao over a dispute. Wang Gong (王肱) replaced Qiao Mao as the Administrator of Dong Commandery.

== In Romance of the Three Kingdoms ==
Qiao Mao appears as a minor character in the 14th-century historical novel Romance of the Three Kingdoms, which romanticises the events before and during the Three Kingdoms period. His family name was erroneously written as 喬/乔 in Chinese instead of 橋/桥. He was serving as the Administrator (太守) of Dong Commandery (東郡) around 190 and 191. In chapter 5, he was named as one of the 18 regional warlords in the coalition that launched the campaign against Dong Zhuo. In chapter 6, Liu Dai, another of the 18 warlords, asked for supplies from Qiao Mao, who refused. Liu Dai then led his forces to attack Qiao Mao's camp, killed him, and took control over his forces.

== See also ==
- Lists of people of the Three Kingdoms
