= Han Hao =

Late 2nd/early 3rd century military officer serving warlord Cao Cao

- 韓浩

Central Protector of the Army (中護軍)
- In office 207 – ?
- Monarch: Emperor Xian of Han

Personal details
- Born: Unknown Jiaozuo, Henan
- Died: Unknown
- Occupation: Military officer
- Courtesy name: Yuansi (元嗣)
- Peerage: Marquis of Wansui Village (萬歲亭侯)

Han Hao (fl. 190 – 215), courtesy name Yuansi, he gained a reputation for loyalty and valor, comparable to Shi Huan. A military officer serving under the warlords Wang Kuang, Yuan Shu and Cao Cao during the late Eastern Han dynasty of China, he became a trusted official of Cao Cao.

== Life ==
Han Hao was from Henei. As the Han's authority declined, Han Hao gathered his followers to defend against bandits who hid in the marshes and hills. Appointed to office by Wang Kuang, the Administrator of Henei Commandery, he took part in the war against Dong Zhuo but Wang Kuang was outmaneuvered and destroyed by Dong Zhuo at Mengjin with Han Hao there. Wang Kuang was soon killed, Dong Zhuo held Han Hao's uncle Du Yang hostage to try to persuade Han Hao to serve but Han Hao rejected it, he took service under Yuan Shu, who had heard of Han Hao's strength, as Cavalry Commandant. Xiahou Dun heard of Han Hao and sought a meeting, impressed Xiahou Dun who had Han Hao follow him as a commander of troops.

In 193, Cao Cao invaded Tao Qian, the Governor of Xu Province, with Han Hao left back at Puyang with Xiahou Dun. Cao Cao's subordinates Zhang Miao and Chen Gong rebelled in Yan Province and invited the warlord Lü Bu to take Yan, Xun Yu realized the danger and wrote to Xiahou Dun for reinforcements to Juancheng County. Xiahou Dun led a lightly armed force towards Juancheng but he encountered Lü Bu's army on the way and engaged the enemy in battle. Lü Bu withdrew his forces and took advantage of Xiahou Dun's absence to conquer Puyang, capturing much of Xiahou's supplies and equipment. Lü Bu later sent his men to pretend to surrender to Xiahou Dun, who fell for the ruse and was taken hostage by the enemy in his own camp. Lü Bu's men demanded a ransom. Xiahou Dun's troops became fearful and confused when they heard that their commander had been taken hostage.

Han Hao had his men occupy the gates of the camp and then gave orders for the other officers to remain in their respective camps and not make any moves. The situation in the other camps became stable. He then headed towards where Xiahou Dun was being held and shouted at the hostage-takers, "You murderous traitors, how dare you take the commander hostage! Do you still expect to live? I've received orders to attack the enemy, so I won't let you have your way just for the sake of one officer." With tears in his eyes, he told Xiahou Dun, "This is the law. I have to follow it." Han Hao then ordered his men to attack the hostage-takers, who were shocked by his response and immediately gave up. The hostage-takers kowtowed and begged for their lives, "We only want to obtain some money for our use and we'll leave after that." Han Hao reprimanded them sternly and had them all executed. Xiahou Dun was saved and the army would soon arrive at Juancheng to settle things there. When Cao Cao heard what Han Hao had done, he held Han Hao as an example for all ages, ordering others to attack any future hostage takers which soon ended such actions while the Jin critic Sun Sheng praised Han Hao for returning to the historical method rather than following the more recent habits that had led to even nobility being kidnapped.

Han Hao was one of the figures, amidst famine and drought, credited for pushing for the establishment of that tuntian policy, started in 196, that proved so critical for Wei's logistics and prosperity. Han Hao was promoted to Protector of the Army (護軍), responsible for managing army discipline with Rafe De Crespigny describing Han Hao as a senior and trusted officer. In 207, there was debate within Cao Cao's camp about the plan for a risky march to Liucheng to attack the Yuan remnants and the Wuhuan with Shi Huan seeking Han Hao's support to oppose the long march but Han Hao backed the plan, believing that they were strong and could win while Cao Cao would have plans but if they left their opponents alone it would come back to haunt them. Han Hao joined the march to the Battle of White Wolf Mountain. After the destruction of the Yuan clan, Han Hao was promoted to Central Protector of the Army (中護軍), Major (司馬) and Chief Clerk (長史).

In 213, Han Hao joined a petition calling for Cao Cao to become Duke with the Weishu suggesting he had been enoffed by this point. In 215, Han Hao was part of the campaign against the theocratic warlord Zhang Lu at Hanzhong and after Zhang Lu's surrender, some suggested Han Hao's ability as a strategist would make him useful under Xiahou Yuan in defending the border. Cao Cao refused as he could not do without his Protector of the Army and kept Han Hao with him. Han Hao died around 216 with Cao Cao mourning and his adopted son Rong was accepted as heir

Chen Shou, the author of the Records of the Three Kingdoms, commented that Han Hao was a courageous and loyal man who remained collected in any situation.

== In Romance of the Three Kingdoms ==
In the 14th-century historical novel Romance of the Three Kingdoms, Han Hao is the brother of Han Xuan, the Administrator of Changsha. After Han Xuan is slain by Wei Yan, Han Hao wants to take revenge and volunteers to lead an attack with Xiahou De on Liu Bei's general Huang Zhong at Mount Tiandang. In the battle, Han Hao is slain by Huang Zhong and while Xiahou De is killed by Yan Yan.

== See also ==
- Lists of people of the Three Kingdoms
