= AD 192 =

192 in various calendars
- Gregorian calendar: 192; CXCII
- Ab urbe condita: 945
- Assyrian calendar: 4942
- Balinese saka calendar: 113–114
- Bengali calendar: −402 – −401
- Berber calendar: 1142
- Buddhist calendar: 736
- Burmese calendar: −446
- Byzantine calendar: 5700–5701
- Chinese calendar: 辛未年 (Metal Goat); 2889 or 2682 — to — 壬申年 (Water Monkey); 2890 or 2683
- Coptic calendar: −92 – −91
- Discordian calendar: 1358
- Ethiopian calendar: 184–185
- Hebrew calendar: 3952–3953
- Hindu calendars
- Vikram Samvat: 248–249
- Shaka Samvat: 113–114
- Kali Yuga: 3292–3293
- Holocene calendar: 10192
- Iranian calendar: 430 BP – 429 BP
- Islamic calendar: 443 BH – 442 BH
- Javanese calendar: 69–70
- Julian calendar: 192; CXCII
- Korean calendar: 2525
- Minguo calendar: 1720 before ROC 民前1720年
- Nanakshahi calendar: −1276
- Seleucid era: 503/504 AG
- Thai solar calendar: 734–735
- Tibetan calendar: ལྕགས་མོ་ལུག་ལོ་ (female Iron-Sheep); 318 or −63 or −835 — to — ཆུ་ཕོ་སྤྲེ་ལོ་ (male Water-Monkey); 319 or −62 or −834

Year 192 (CXCII) was a leap year starting on Saturday of the Julian calendar. At the time, it was known as the Year of the Consulship of Aelius and Pertinax (or, less frequently, year 945 Ab urbe condita). The denomination 192 for this year has been used since the early medieval period, when the Anno Domini calendar era became the prevalent method for Europeans for naming years.

== Events ==
=== By place ===
==== Roman Empire ====
- December 31 – Emperor Commodus alarms the Senate, by appearing dressed as a gladiator for his new consulship on January 1. His mistress Marcia finds her name on the imperial execution list, and hires champion wrestler Narcissus to assassinate Commodus; the Antonines Dynasty ends.
- Civil war again strikes Ancient Rome (192–193).
- Barbarians strike the city of Rome during the Civil War on August 22. 45 die.

==== China ====
- May 22 – Lü Bu assassinates warlord Dong Zhuo, who has controlled the central government of the Han dynasty (since 189).

==== Vietnam ====
- The kingdom of Champa begins to control south and central Vietnam (approximate date).

=== By topic ===
==== Arts and Science ====
- A fire destroys Galen's library.

==== Religion ====
- Syriac Christians establish an early Christian community in Kerala, India.

== Births ==
- Cao Zhi (or King Chen), Chinese prince and poet (d. 232)
- Gordian II, Roman emperor (Year of the Six Emperors) (d. 238)

== Deaths ==
- May 22 – Dong Zhuo, Chinese general and warlord (b. 134)
- December 31 – Commodus, Roman emperor (b. 161)
- Annia Fundania Faustina, Roman noblewoman
- Bao Xin, Chinese general and warlord (b. 152)
- Cai Yong, Chinese official and calligrapher (b. 132)
- Liu Dai, Chinese official, general and politician
- Lu Zhi, Chinese scholar and general (b. 159)
- Wang Yun, Chinese official and politician (b. 137)
- Yuan Yi, Chinese official and warlord
- Zhang Zhi, Chinese scholar and calligrapher
