= Campaign against Dong Zhuo =

Coalition of officials and warlords against Chinese warlord Dong Zhuo (190)

- Part of the wars at the end of the Han dynasty
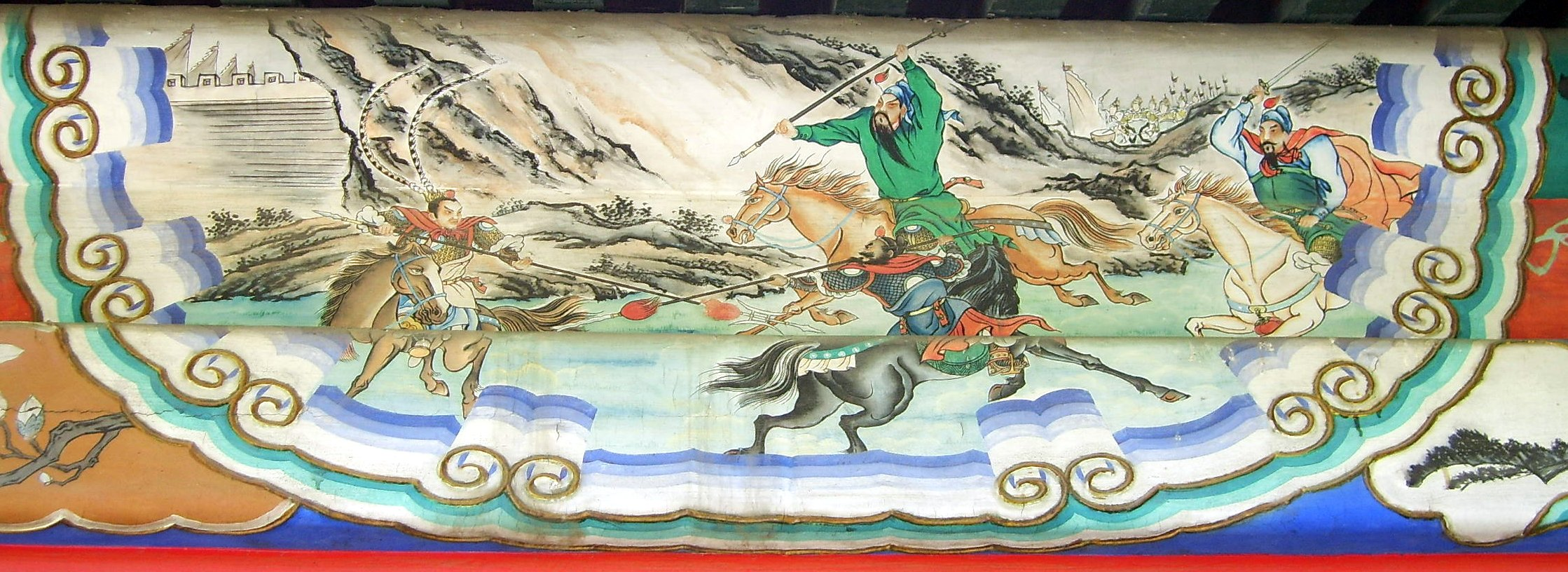
- A mural in Fragrant Hills depicting the duel between the three sworn brothers and Lü Bu at Hulao Pass in a fictional encounter.
Date	February 190–191
Location	Henan, China
Result	Inconclusive; Dong Zhuo retreats west, Coalition disbanded

Belligerents
Guandong Coalition	Dong Zhuo

Commanders and leaders
Yuan Shao; Cao Cao; Yuan Shu; Sun Jian; Zhang Miao; Han Fu; Bao Xin; Yuan Yi; Zhang Chao; Zhang Yang; Yufuluo; Kong Zhou; Wang Kuang; Liu Dai; Qiao Mao; Liu Bei	Dong Zhuo; Lü Bu; Li Jue; Guo Si; Hua Xiong †; Xu Rong; Hu Zhen; Zhang Ji; Niu Fu; Fan Chou; Li Ru

Strength
100,000+	Described as less than coalitions'

Campaign against Dong Zhuo
- Traditional Chinese: 董卓討伐戰
- Simplified Chinese: 董卓讨伐战
Transcriptions
Standard Mandarin
- Hanyu Pinyin: Dǒng Zhuó Tǎofá Zhàn

The Campaign against Dong Zhuo was a punitive expedition initiated by a coalition of regional officials and warlords against the warlord Dong Zhuo in 190 in the late Eastern Han dynasty. The members of the coalition claimed that Dong had the intention of usurping the throne by holding Emperor Xian hostage and by establishing a strong influence in the imperial court. They justified their campaign as to remove Dong from power. The campaign led to the evacuation of the capital Luoyang and the shifting of the imperial court to Chang'an. It was a prelude to the end of the Han dynasty and, subsequently, the Three Kingdoms period.

In the 14th-century historical novel Romance of the Three Kingdoms, the campaign is memorable for at least two famous incidents: one is Guan Yu's slaying of Hua Xiong; the other is the three-on-one duel between the three sworn brothers (Liu Bei, Guan Yu, Zhang Fei) and Lü Bu. The two scenes are often reenacted in Chinese opera along with other famous scenes from the novel. Both incidents however, are fictional; Hua Xiong was captured and executed by Sun Jian after a brief battle. Liu, Guan and Zhang did participate in the campaign although their actions are not further described, with no mention that they dueled with Lü Bu, who, historically, was defeated by Sun Jian in battle.

== Background ==
Following the death of Emperor Ling in 189, General-in-Chief He Jin summoned the frontier general Dong Zhuo from the northwest into the capital city of Luoyang. Dong was ordered to lead his troops into the capital city to aid He in eliminating the eunuch faction, the Ten Attendants, from the imperial court. However, before Dong Zhuo's arrival, He Jin's plan was revealed and he was assassinated by the eunuchs on 22 September 189. He Jin's associates led by Yuan Shao stormed the palace after the assassination and started massacring eunuchs. The young Emperor Shao and his younger brother, the Prince of Chenliu, were brought out of the palace by the surviving eunuchs during the chaos. The emperor lost the Imperial Seal during his escape. They were eventually discovered by a search party and escorted back to the palace safely by Dong Zhuo and his men.

Subsequently, the warlord Ding Yuan was killed by his subordinate Lü Bu for opposing Dong Zhuo's decision to depose Emperor Shao. Lü then defected to Dong's side.

In September 189, Dong Zhuo deposed Emperor Shao and installed the Prince of Chenliu on the throne. The prince became historically known as Emperor Xian. Dong appointed himself as Chancellor of State, an official post abolished almost 200 years before. Later that month, Dong had Empress Dowager He killed by poison. On 26 March 190, Dong also had Liu Bian (the former Emperor Shao) killed.

Since becoming Chancellor, Dong Zhuo had established a strong influence in the imperial court. He was authoritarian and showed no regard for the absolute monarchy as he made the final decisions on policies without consulting or seeking approval from the emperor. He eliminated several of his opponents in the imperial court to further strengthen his grip over the apparatus of state. Yuan Shao fled from Luoyang after openly disagreeing with Dong Zhuo's decision to depose Emperor Shao. Dong Zhuo feared that Yuan Shao might rise in revolt against him as Yuan was also an influential figure in politics as well. Dong heeded his advisor's suggestions and proposed to the emperor to appoint Yuan as Grand Administrator of Bohai as an act of appeasement.

== Course of events ==
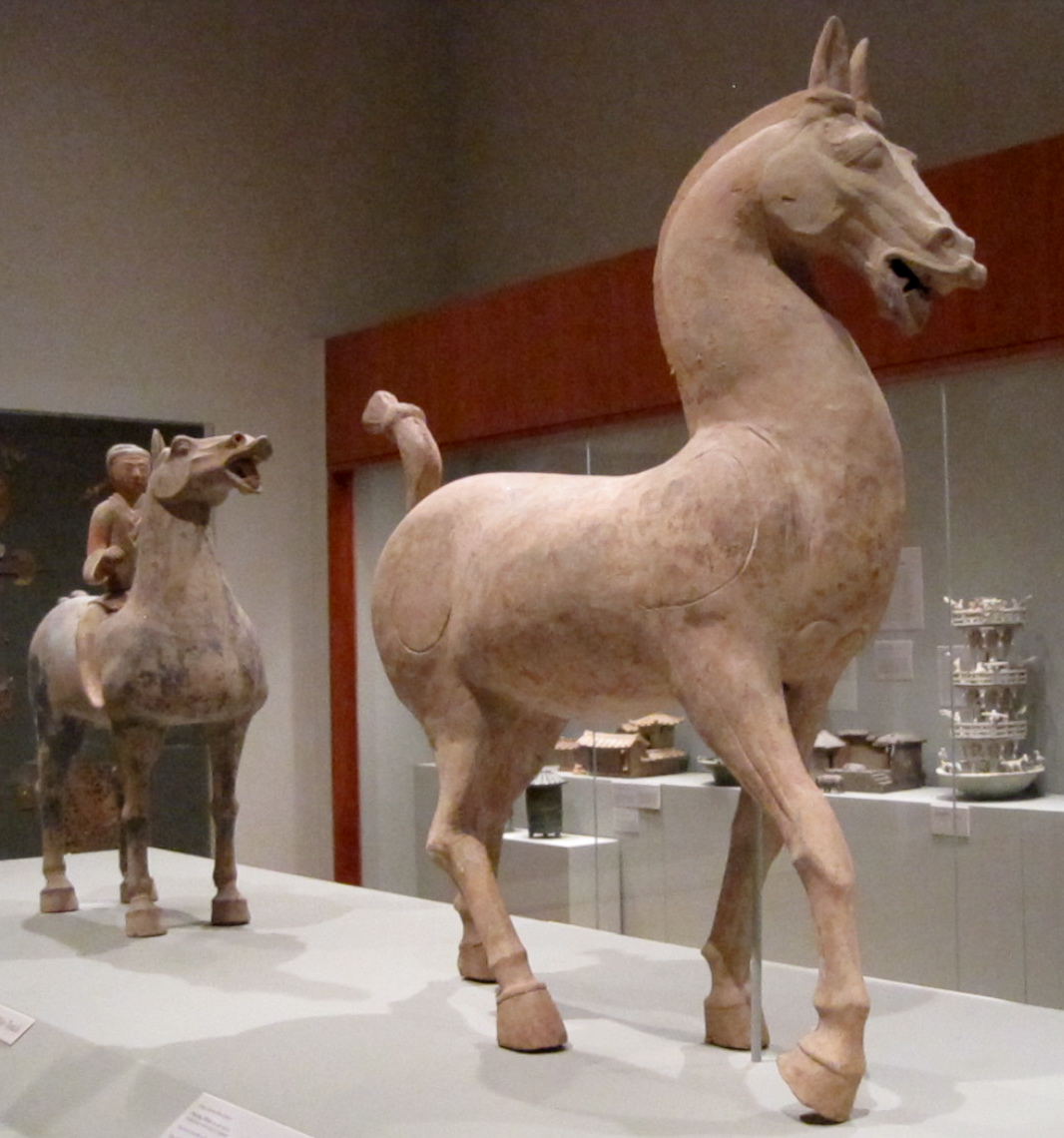
Ceramic statues of a prancing horse (foreground) and a cavalryman on horseback (background), Eastern Han dynasty (25-220 AD)

=== Formation of the coalition ===
While in Bohai, Yuan Shao was not appeased by Dong Zhuo's proposal to appoint him as Grand Administrator. He planned to start a coup d'etat to remove Dong from power by rising in revolt but he was kept in check by Han Fu, the Governor of Ji Province (冀州).

At the same time, the Grand Administrator of Dong Commandery, Qiao Mao, forged letters of accusation against Dong Zhuo, denouncing him as a traitor with the intention of usurping the throne, calling for a punitive expedition against Dong. These letters were distributed all around the nation in the name of officials from the capital. Regional officials and warlords all around China received the letters and responded to the call to remove Dong Zhuo from power.

In February 190, the Guandong Coalition (關東聯軍, literally: Coalition East of the Pass) was formed after several regional officials and warlords gathered east of Hangu Pass with their armies in response to the call for a punitive war against Dong Zhuo. Yuan Shao was elected to be the leader of the coalition. The forces of Sun Jian and Cao Cao also participated in the campaign under the banners of Yuan Shu and Zhang Miao respectively. The participants of the campaign included:

- Yuan Shu, General of the Rear (後將軍)
- Han Fu, Governor (牧) of Ji Province
- Kong Zhou, Inspector (刺史) of Yu Province
- Liu Dai, Inspector of Yan Province
- Wang Kuang, Grand Administrator (太守) of Henei
- Yuan Shao, Grand Administrator of Bohai
- Zhang Miao, Grand Administrator of Chenliu
- Qiao Mao, Grand Administrator of Dong Commandery
- Yuan Yi, Grand Administrator of Shanyang
- Bao Xin, Chancellor (相) of Jibei
- Zhang Chao, Grand Administrator of Guangling
- Zhang Yang, Grand Administrator of Shangdang
- Yufuluo, Chanyu of the Southern Xiongnu

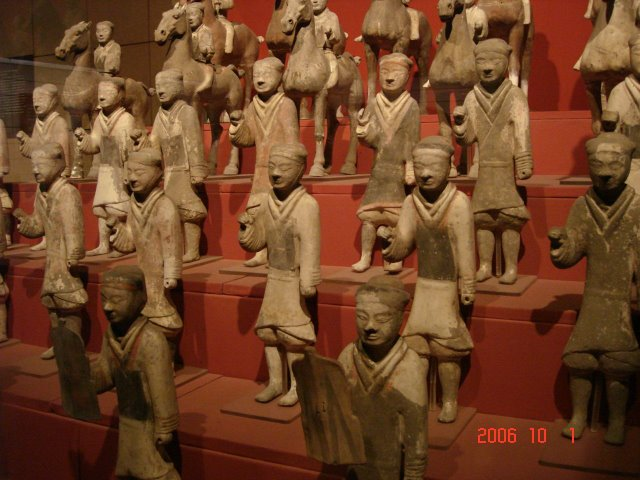
Pottery figurines of shield-wielding infantry (foreground) and cavalrymen on horses (background), dated from the Western Han dynasty (202 BC –9 AD)

The coalition forces encamped in several locations east of the capital city of Luoyang, effectively surrounding it. The locations of the coalition members in relation to Luoyang are as follows:

- To the north, in Henei (河內): Yuan Shao, Wang Kuang, Zhang Yang, Yufuluo
- To the east, in Suanzao (酸棗): Zhang Miao, Liu Dai, Qiao Mao, Yuan Yi
- To the south, in Luyang (魯陽): Yuan Shu
- To the southeast, in Yingchuan (穎川): Kong Zhou
- To the northeast, in Ye: Han Fu

The blockade had the effect of cutting supplies from the eastern part of the Han empire from the capital, which drastically reduced the government's tax revenue. In response, Dong Zhuo melted nine of the Twelve Metal Colossi and other treasures to gather bronze that he could use to mint more coinage. These new coins flooded the market and caused rampant inflation throughout the empire.

Despite the impressive showing of force, most of the coalition's armies were hurriedly rallied family retainers and opportunists for loot with little battle experience. The leader of the coalition Yuan Shao himself had not seen action in much of the 180s since he had been in six years mourning for first his mother and then his adoptive father, during which he could not participate in military matters. This is contrasted with Dong Zhuo's battle-hardened frontiersmen, who had previously fought in the Liang Province Rebellion.

=== Razing of Luoyang ===
Dong Zhuo was alarmed by the formation of the Guandong Coalition against him. He proposed that the capital of Luoyang be evacuated immediately and the imperial court be shifted to Chang'an in the west. All civilians were to evacuate Luoyang as well and move to Chang'an, with only Dong and his military staying behind to defend Luoyang from the coalition forces.

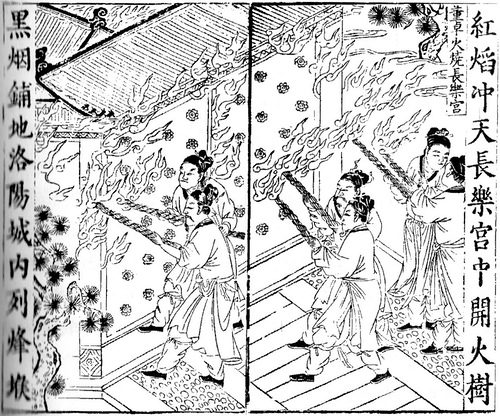
A Qing dynasty illustration of the fire being ignited.

Dong Zhuo's proposal was met with strong criticisms from other court officials but Dong silenced them by deposing anyone who opposed him. On 9 April 190, Dong's proposal was implemented. He ordered his soldiers to massacre and loot the rich households of Luoyang and drive Luoyang's civilian population towards Chang'an. Emperor Xian, nobles, aristocrats and officials followed the civilians and Dong's troops as they made their long journey towards Chang'an. Anyone who refused to obey orders to evacuate to Chang'an was killed on the spot. Dong Zhuo also ordered Lü Bu to lead men to raid ancient tombs and burial mounts for their valuables and treasure. After the evacuation, Luoyang was set on fire and razed to the ground. According to Chen Shou's Records of Three Kingdoms "the numbers of the innocent dead were beyond measurement."

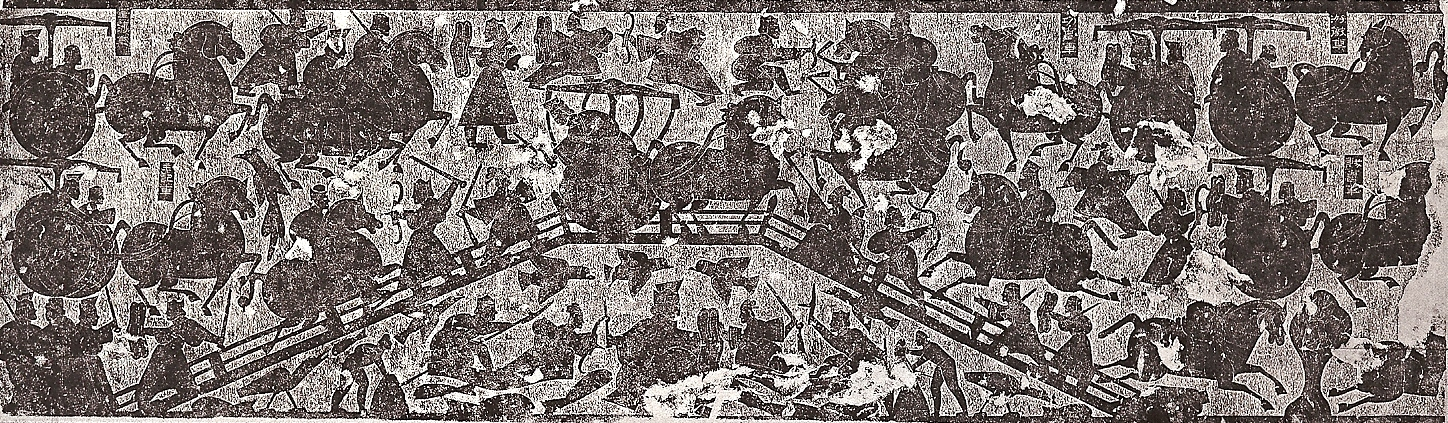
Rubbing of a low bas-relief carving on the west wall of the Wu family shrines in Shandong, dated 2nd century AD, showing a battle scene at a bridge

In Suanzao (酸棗), Cao Cao led his men westward to attack Dong Zhuo's forces. He was followed by a contingent from Zhang Miao's army led by Wei Zi (衛茲). Cao Cao's army was defeated by Dong's forces, led by Xu Rong, in the Battle of Xingyang, and Cao Cao himself was injured in battle. Cao Hong offered his steed to him and he followed Cao Cao on foot, and they managed to escape from the battlefield. Xu withdrew his troops after the battle.

When Cao Cao returned to Suanzao, he suggested that the coalition pursue Dong Zhuo's retreating forces to threaten Dong by showing him that the coalition was still on the move. However, Zhang Miao and the others present dismissed his suggestion. Cao Cao then led his men to join Yuan Shao in Henei together with Xiahou Dun. After Cao's departure, the coalition forces stationed in Suanzao ran out of supplies and dispersed. Liu Dai seized the opportunity to kill Qiao Mao, whom he held a grudge against.

At the same time, Dong Zhuo sent reputable men such as Han Rong (韓融), Yin Xiu (陰修), Humu Ban (胡毋班), Wu Xiu (吳修), and Wang Gui (王瑰) to see Yuan Shao and negotiate for an armistice. However, Yuan had all the negotiators detained and killed except for Han Rong. Seeing peace was impossible, Dong Zhuo rapidly surrounded Wang Kuang's encampment in Heyang Ford (河陽津) north of Luoyang and dealt a defeat so severe that Wang Kuang abandoned the coalition and fled back to his home in Taishan Commandery (泰山郡).

=== Sun Jian's advances ===
In Luyang to the south, Sun Jian, who had joined Yuan Shu with 20,000 - 30,000 men, was given the rank General Who Quells Rebels (破虜將軍) and Governor of Yu Province by Yuan. Yuan made Sun the vanguard, and Sun started to train his men in Luyang.

In the winter of 190, Dong Zhuo sent a force of some ten thousands to attack Luyang. At the time, Sun Jian's men were having a drinking party, but Sun did not stir upon hearing the news; instead, he calmly continued to pass his wine around while his troops gathered into formation. Seeing such discipline, Dong Zhuo's men turned around and retreated.

In March 191, Sun Jian moved his camp north to Liangdong (梁東), but he was outnumbered by Xu Rong there. With several dozen men, he broke through the encirclement. Seeing that his red scarf could easily identify him, Sun Jian gave it to a close aide Zu Mao (祖茂), whom Xu Rong's soldiers chased while Sun escaped. Zu Mao later hung the scarf onto a half-burnt pillar, and hid himself in the tall grasses nearby. The enemies surrounded the pillar and approached cautiously till they realized they had been fooled, whereupon they retreated.

Gathering his scattered armies, Sun Jian went forward to camp in Yangren (陽人; believed to be near present-day Wenquan, Ruzhou, Henan). This time, Dong Zhuo sent Hua Xiong, Hu Zhen, and Lü Bu with 5,000 men to attack Sun. However, Lü Bu, who was in charge of cavalry, was not in good terms with Hu Zhen and quarreled with him. Sun Jian seized the opportunity to attack them, and Dong Zhuo's forces were defeated in a rout. Hua Xiong was captured by Sun and promptly executed.

At this time, someone told Yuan Shu that if Sun Jian defeated Dong Zhuo and took over the capital, he would not be controllable anymore. The doubtful Yuan then ceased providing supplies to Sun. Sun rode the hundred odd li from Yangren to Luyang in the night to see Yuan, whereupon he said to the latter, "I put myself in danger during battle, with a primary purpose to eliminate a traitor (Dong Zhuo) for the country and second to avenge the deaths of your kinsmen (Yuan Shu's uncle was killed by Dong Zhuo). I have no personal grudge against Dong Zhuo. Yet you believed slanderous talks and suspect me!" The words put Yuan to shame and he immediately ordered the food supply to be delivered.

Fearing Sun Jian, Dong Zhuo sent his subordinate Li Jue as an emissary to seek peace and cement an alliance. Li Jue also promised Sun Jian appointments in the government service for his sons. To this, Sun replied, "Dong Zhuo opposes Heaven and defies the law. Until I have killed you and all your clan, and shown your heads to the Four Seas, I shall not be able to die in peace. How can I ally with you?"

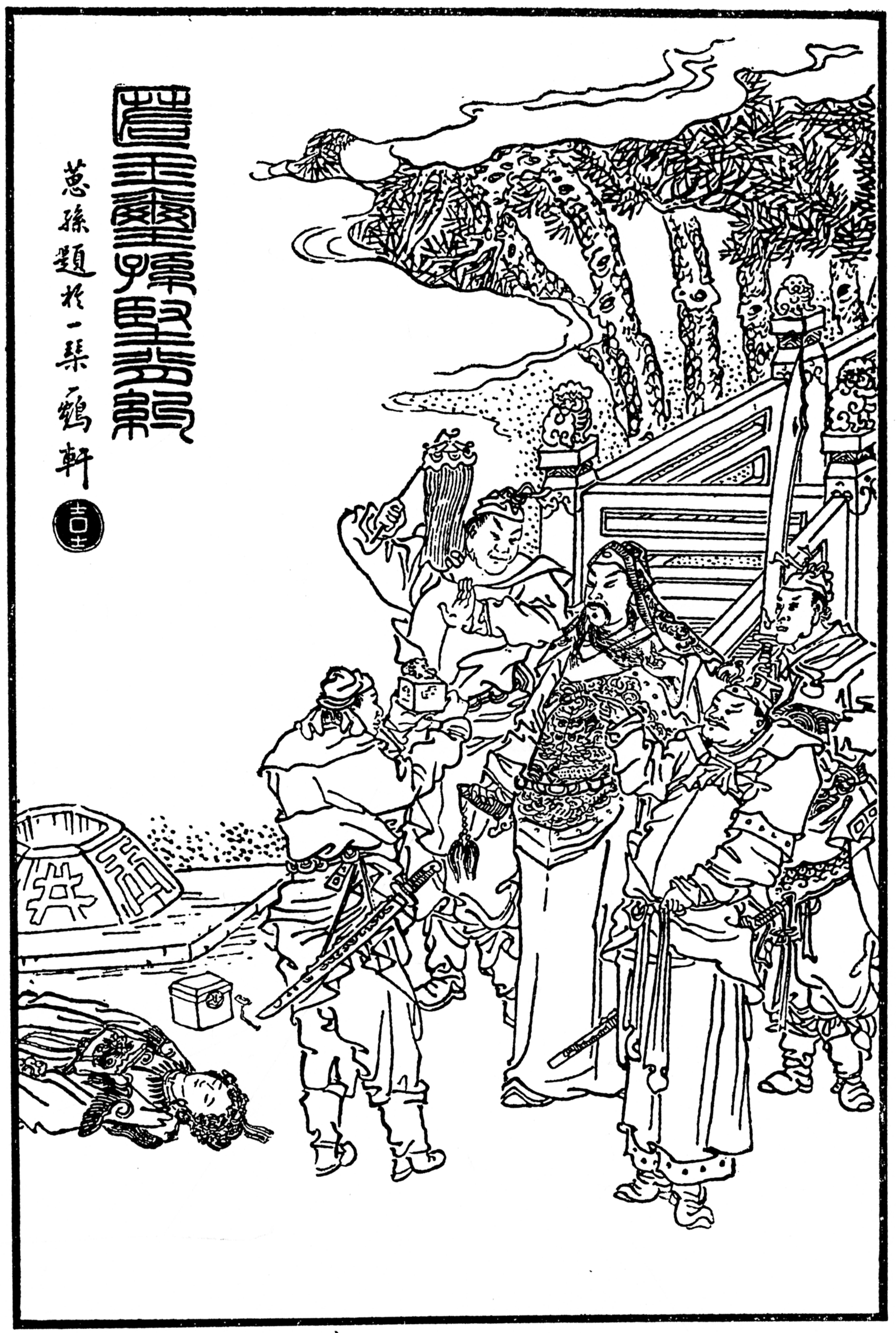
A Qing dynasty illustration of Sun Jian finding the Imperial Seal.

Sun Jian then led his forces to Dagu Pass (大谷關), a fortified pass guarding Luoyang to the south, 90 li away from Luoyang. Dong Zhuo personally fought in the battle at the Later Han tombs, but was defeated and fled to Mianchi and Shan (陝), west of Luoyang. Sun Jian then continued to march into Luoyang, where he met and routed the forces of Lü Bu. Settling in, Sun ordered his men to reseal the tombs of former emperors that were excavated by Dong Zhuo. It was said in Wei Zhao's Book of Wu (吳書) that Sun Jian found the lost Imperial Seal in a well south of Luoyang and kept it for himself.

Sun Jian then sent part of his force forward to Xin'an and Mianchi to threaten Dong Zhuo's defense positions. Dong now sent Dong Yue (董越) to camp at Mianchi, Duan Wei (段煨) to camp at Huayin, and Niu Fu to camp at Anyi (安邑). His other commanders were spread out among the counties to block any attack from the east of the mountains. After these arrangements, Dong Zhuo led his own troops away to Chang'an.

Having repaired the imperial tombs, Sun Jian led his army back to Luyang as the ruined Luoyang was vulnerable to possible counterattacks by Dong Zhuo. The former capital of Luoyang was now abandoned by both contending forces.

=== Internal conflict ===
Despite Sun Jian's successes, the coalition did not build upon them due to poor communication and coordination among the leaders. The warlords in the east were unaware that Emperor Xian was still alive as they were isolated by the passes separating Luoyang from the east. Yuan Shao and Han Fu proposed to enthrone Liu Yu, the Inspector of You Province (幽州) and a member of the imperial clan, as the new emperor. Cao Cao and Yuan Shu disagreed with the proposal. When Yuan Shao and Han Fu sent a messenger to Liu Yu to inform him, Liu rebuked the messenger sternly and refused the offer flatly. Liu expressed his loyalty to the current Emperor Xian and threatened to head north into Xiongnu territory if Yuan Shao insisted that he become the new emperor. After repeated failed attempts, Yuan Shao decided to give up. In addition, the warlords turned their attention from Dong Zhuo back to themselves and started to pursue their individual interests again instead of uniting against Dong Zhuo.

Han Fu, who was in charge of provisions, gradually stopped supplying the coalition army. His subordinate Qu Yi rebelled against him and defeated him before defecting over to Yuan Shao. The incident alerted Yuan of his need to secure his sources of supply and he plotted to seize Han's lands. Yuan collaborated with Gongsun Zan secretly to attack Han Fu's Ji Province (冀州) and eventually Han surrendered Ji Province to Yuan.

Yuan Shao sent Zhou Yu (Renming) (周喁) to attack Sun Jian, who was returning from Luoyang to join Yuan Shu. In the Battle of Yangcheng, Zhou made a surprise attack on Sun's camp at Yangcheng and captured it. Yuan Shu sent Gongsun Yue (公孫越) to assist Sun Jian in fighting Zhou Yu. Gongsun Yue was killed in the battle even though it was a victory for Sun Jian. Gongsun Zan held Yuan Shao responsible for Gongsun Yue's death and declared war on Yuan Shao, which led to the Battle of Jieqiao subsequently.

By then, the coalition had failed and collapsed, existing only in name.

=== Death of Dong Zhuo ===
For the following year, the warlords ceased to take any action against Dong Zhuo. Dong occasionally sent an army to attack the warlord Zhu Jun and plundered his territory.

Dong Zhuo returned to his tyrant status in the imperial court, but he had become less tolerant towards dissent, as any official who uttered a slight offensive remark would be killed immediately. He installed all members of his clan and relatives by marriage in high-ranking official posts. Even his infant sons were conferred titles of marquises and played with gold seals and purple tassels.

Court officials Wang Yun, Huang Wan (黃琬), Shisun Rui (士孫瑞) and Yang Zan (楊瓚) plotted to assassinate Dong Zhuo. They persuaded Lü Bu to join their cause because Lü's relationship with Dong was becoming increasingly strained after Dong threw a hand-axe at him and due to his affair with one of Dong's chambermaids.

On 22 May 192, Dong Zhuo was on the way to an assembly in his chariot when Li Su advanced towards him and stabbed him. Dong shouted for Lü Bu to protect him, but Lü killed him instead. Dong's relatives were executed after his death while his corpse was left exposed on the streets of Chang'an. The officer guarding the corpse lit a wick on the navel and it burned for days on the fats of the corpse.

After Dong Zhuo's death, several of his loyalists, such as Fan Chou, Guo Si and Li Jue, escaped as they believed that their loyalty towards Dong Zhuo would be considered as treason. Wang Yun, who had taken control of the government after Dong Zhuo's death, heard their appeal for amnesty and said, "Of all those who should be pardoned, they are the exceptions." Dong's loyalists were outraged by Wang's remarks and waged war. However, they were defeated by Lü Bu and the imperial forces. Eventually, Dong Zhuo's remnant forces managed to outwit Lü Bu by distracting him and they seized control of Chang'an. Wang Yun was killed.

The power of the Eastern Han dynasty fell into the hands of Dong Zhuo's remnants after that and gradually evolved into a struggle for power, which spread throughout the nation progressively.

== In Romance of the Three Kingdoms ==
In the 14th-century historical novel Romance of the Three Kingdoms, the author Luo Guanzhong employed artistic license rather freely as he changed some details of this campaign to better portray the main characters. For example, there is historical evidence that Liu Bei, Guan Yu, and Zhang Fei participated in the campaign but no specific feats, yet their achievements eclipse those of Sun Jian in the novel. Luo Guanzhong also simplified some of the historical events, invented fictional battles, and changed the sequence of events. However, due to the popularity of the novel, many people hold the events detailed in the novel to be true, not knowing the true history as presented in definitive sources such as the Book of the Later Han, Records of the Three Kingdoms, or Zizhi Tongjian. This fictional account of history is also adopted by many Chinese operas and video games.

=== Uprising against Dong Zhuo ===
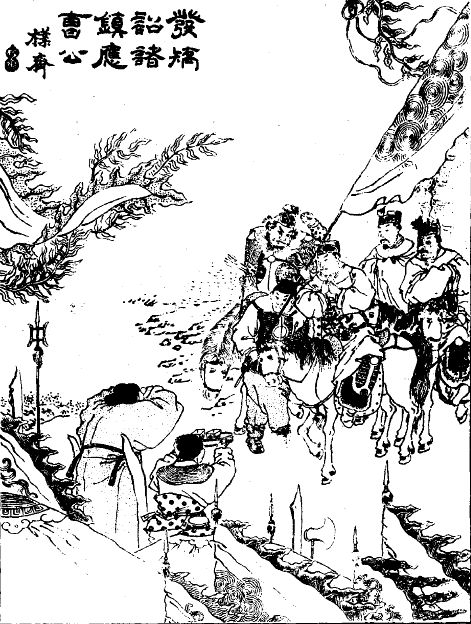
Warlords responding to Cao Cao's call to arms, Qing dynasty illustration

In chapter 5 of Romance of the Three Kingdoms, Cao Cao attempted to assassinate Dong Zhuo but failed and escaped to his hometown in Chenliu. Subsequently, Cao sent secret imperial decrees, in the name of the emperor, to various regional warlords and officials, ordering them to rise up against Dong Zhuo and remove him from power. Many responded to the call and they formed the Anti-Dong Zhuo Coalition (反董卓聯合軍).

The novel has a slightly different list of participants in the coalition:

- Cao Cao, Colonel of Resolute Cavalry (驍騎校尉)
- Yuan Shu, General of the Rear (後將軍), Administrator of Nanyang (南陽太守)
- Han Fu, Inspector of Ji Province (冀州刺史)
- Kong Zhou, Inspector of Yu Province (豫州刺史)
- Liu Dai, Inspector of Yan Province (兗州刺史)
- Wang Kuang, Administrator of Henei (河內太守)
- Zhang Miao, Administrator of Chenliu (陳留太守)
- Qiao Mao, Administrator of Dong Commandery (東郡太守)
- Yuan Yi, Administrator of Shanyang (山陽太守)
- Bao Xin, Chancellor of Jibei (濟北相)
- Kong Rong, Administrator of Beihai (北海太守)
- Zhang Chao, Administrator of Guangling (廣陵太守)
- Tao Qian, Inspector of Xu Province (徐州刺史)
- Ma Teng, Administrator of Western Liang (西涼太守)
- Gongsun Zan, Administrator of Beiping (北平太守)
- Zhang Yang, Administrator of Shangdang (上黨太守)
- Sun Jian, Administrator of Changsha (長沙太守), Marquis of Wucheng (烏程侯)
- Yuan Shao, Administrator of Bohai (渤海太守), Marquis of Qi (祁鄉侯)

With eighteen warlords participating in the novel, the campaign is thus popularly known as "The eighteen warlords' campaign against Dong Zhuo" (十八路諸侯討董卓). In this campaign, Liu Bei, with his sworn brothers Guan Yu and Zhang Fei, offered their service to Gongsun Zan, Liu's friend and former classmate. After the warlords pledged allegiance to the coalition, they insisted to have Yuan Shao as the commander-in-chief, a role which Yuan reluctantly accepted. Yuan Shao then put Yuan Shu in charge of provisions, and appointed Sun Jian as the vanguard to attack Sishui Pass.

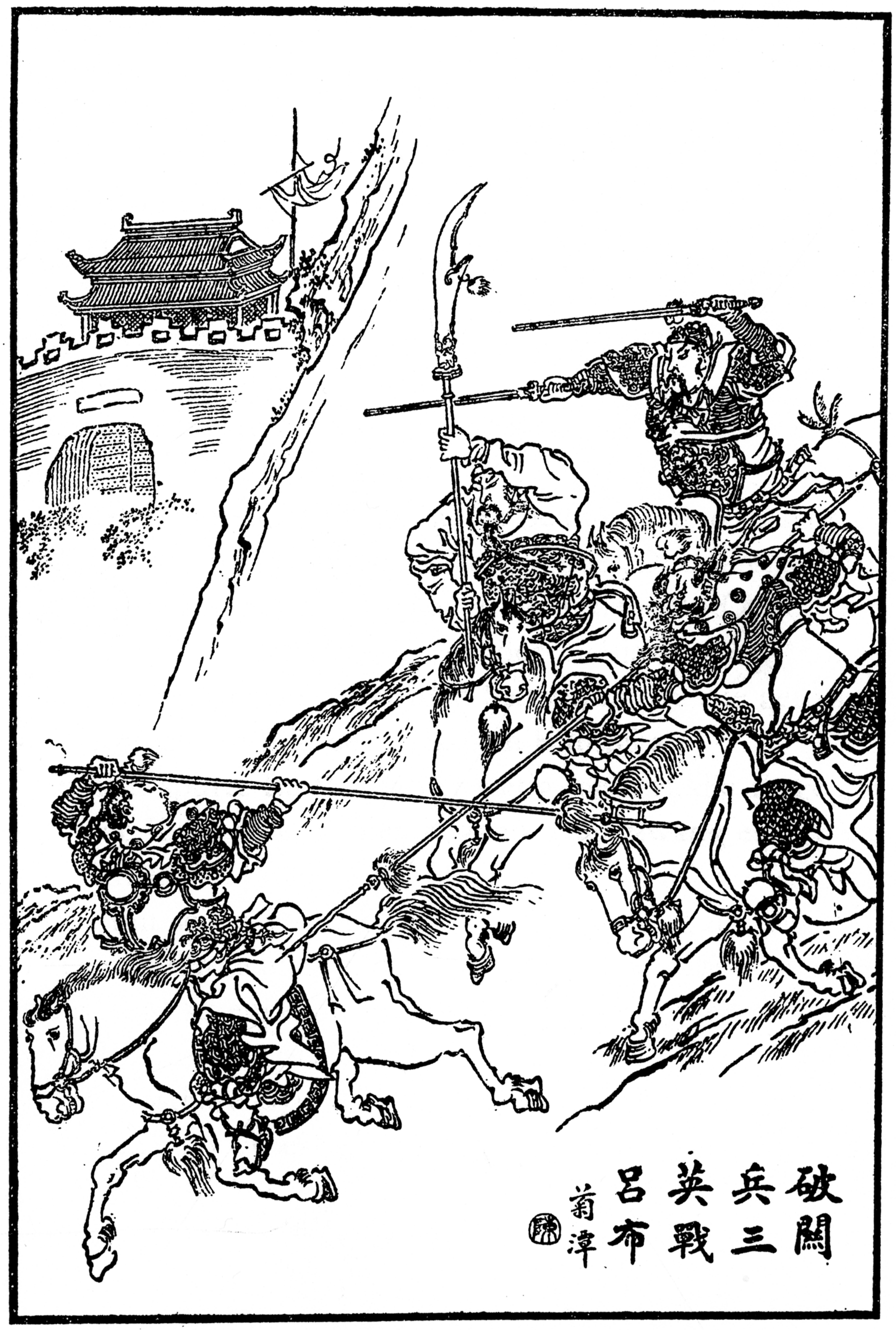
A Qing dynasty illustration of the three sworn brothers dueling with Lü Bu

=== Dissolution ===
While restoring order in Luoyang, Sun Jian was alerted by his men that there is light faintly emitting from a well. He ordered to retrieve whatever was in the well, and they found a dead woman with the Imperial Seal in a silk bag around her neck. As advised by Cheng Pu, Sun Jian kept the Seal for himself and warned his men not to reveal anything about the discovery.

Unfortunately for Sun Jian, one of his soldiers went and told Yuan Shao about it, and was heavily rewarded. During a meeting on the following day, Sun Jian cited health problems as an excuse to return to Changsha, to which Yuan Shao remarked sarcastically, "I know you're ill because of the Imperial Seal", causing Sun to be stunned. After rounds of accusations and denials, Yuan Shao and Sun Jian's men drew swords in preparation for a fight, but the conflict was defused by the rest of the coalition members. Sun Jian then quickly fled from Luoyang with his men. In anger, Yuan Shao sent a letter to Liu Biao of Jing Province, asking Liu Biao to intercept Sun on the way and take him into custody. This gave rise to the conflict between Sun Jian and Liu Biao, which eventually culminated in the death of Sun at the Battle of Xiangyang.

The next day, Cao Cao returned to the main camp from his defeat in Xingyang. He lamented at the lack of motivation within the coalition and left as well. Gongsun Zan told Liu Bei, "Yuan Shao is an incapable leader, and together there will be strife, we should leave", and so they also pulled their forces from the alliance and retreated north. Seeing everyone had dispersed, Yuan Shao dismantled the camps and led his army back to his base.
