= Battle of Xingyang (190) =

Battle between Coalition and Dong Zhuo forces (190)

- Part of the campaign against Dong Zhuo
Date	c.April 190 CE
Location	Xingyang, Henan 34°47′N 113°21′E
Result	Dong Zhuo victory

Belligerents
Guandong Coalition	Dong Zhuo

Commanders and leaders
Cao Cao; Cao Hong; Bao Xin (WIA); Bao Tao †; Wei Zi †	Xu Rong

Strength
3,000+	unknown, but larger than coalition forces

Casualties and losses
Several thousands	
- Location within Henan Battle of Xingyang (190) (China)

Battle of Xingyang
- Traditional Chinese: 滎陽之戰
- Simplified Chinese: 荥阳之战
Transcriptions
Standard Mandarin
- Hanyu Pinyin: Xíngyáng Zhī Zhàn

The Battle of Xingyang was fought in c.April 190 in the late Eastern Han dynasty as part of the campaign against Dong Zhuo. It took place when Dong Zhuo's forces, led by Xu Rong, encountered the pursuing armies of Cao Cao at Xingyang. The battle ended in a victory for Dong Zhuo's forces, with Cao Cao being forced to retreat.

== Background ==
In 190, dissenting regional officials and warlords formed a coalition against the Chancellor of State, Dong Zhuo, who controlled Emperor Xian. Dong Zhuo was concerned that the capital Luoyang was not as easy to defend as Chang'an to the west, and thus moved all civilians and court officials, including the emperor, to Chang'an while the military under Dong stayed to defend Luoyang. During the mass relocation on 9 April, Dong ordered his soldiers to raze Luoyang, confiscate from the rich, and loot from the Han emperor tombs.

Around the time, the coalition members were stationed in different locations as such: Yuan Shao at Henei (河內); Zhang Miao, Liu Dai, Qiao Mao and Yuan Yi at Suanzao (酸棗, near present-day Yanjin, Henan); Yuan Shu at Nanyang (南陽); Kong Zhou at Yingchuan (潁川); Han Fu at Ye. Dong Zhuo's forces were still powerful, so the coalition members did not dare to pursue Dong as he retreated to Chang'an.

Cao Cao, then stationed in Suanzao, saw this as an opportunity to attack Dong Zhuo and he announced to the dormant alliance:

We rallied troops of righteousness to destroy oppression and disorder, now that we're united, why do you hesitate? At the beginning, if Dong Zhuo heard that armies have risen (against him) in Shandong, he would have relied on the imperial house, occupied the old capital [Luoyang], and turned east to attack the rest of the empire; then even though he behaved immorally, he would still be a threat. Now he's burning the palace, holding the Son of Heaven hostage and moving him away. The empire is in disorder and nobody knows where to turn to. This is the time when he is condemned by Heaven. One battle and the empire will be settled. We must not lose this opportunity.

Apparently, Cao Cao did not manage to rally anyone else in the alliance except his friend Wei Zi (衛茲), who was under the warlord Zhang Miao. Nonetheless, the detachment marched west from Suanzao with the intention to occupy Chenggao (成皋); they were joined by Bao Xin, his brother Bao Tao and their personal force.

== Battle ==
Cao Cao and Wei Zi's armies advanced to the Bian River at Xingyang, an important staging post en route to Luoyang, and met the opposing army led by Xu Rong there. In a day of fierce fighting, the coalition force, consisting of a ragtag assembly of family retainers and looters, was ultimately no match for the professional frontiersmen of Dong Zhuo. The coalition was heavily defeated; Bao Tao and Wei Zi were killed. In addition, Cao Cao was hit by a stray arrow and his horse was injured; Bao Xin was also wounded. Cao Cao's younger cousin, Cao Hong, offered him his horse but Cao Cao would not accept at first. Cao Hong then said, "The empire can do without me, but it cannot do without you." Cao Hong then followed Cao Cao on foot and they withdrew back to Suanzao by night.

Xu Rong considered an attack on Suanzao, but he observed that even though Cao Cao's men were few in number they fought fiercely throughout the day, and so assumed that an attack on Suanzao against these sorts of men would be difficult. He, too, withdrew.

== Aftermath ==
Cao Cao returned to Suanzao to see the warlords feasting every day with no intention of attacking Dong Zhuo; he reproached them. Learning from his defeat in Xingyang where he tried to attack Chenggao head-on, Cao Cao came up with an alternative strategy and presented it to the coalition:

Instead of attempting another direct attack from Suanzao, the plan involved taking strategic points to blockade Luoyang and Chenggao. Then Yuan Shu, the coalition general in the south could, instead of attacking Luoyang, threaten Dong Zhuo's new capital in Chang'an. The coalition would position themselves behind fortifications and avoid actual fighting. This arrangement, Cao Cao argued, could show the world that the coalition is on the move while applying pressure on Dong Zhuo's court. In this, Cao Cao was hoping that Dong Zhuo's government would eventually become over-strained, lose credit and collapse. Cao Cao concluded his plan with the words, "Now that our men are fighting for a just cause, if we hesitate and delay, we will disappoint everyone in the empire, and I will be ashamed for you."

However, the generals in Suanzao would not agree to his plan. Cao Cao abandoned the generals in Suanzao to gather troops in Yang Province (揚州) with Xiahou Dun, then went to camp with the coalition commander-in-chief Yuan Shao in Henei (河內). Soon after Cao Cao's departure, the generals in Suanzao ran out of food and dispersed; some even fought amongst themselves. The coalition camp in Suanzao collapsed on itself.

Years later, when Yuan Shao and Cao Cao became rivals in their contest for power, Yuan had his secretary Chen Lin draft a document to denounce Cao before their confrontation at the Battle of Guandu. At one point, Chen Lin used Cao Cao's defeat at the Battle of Xingyang to discredit him:

...he displayed foolhardiness and a lack of forethought. Attacking in haste, he was swiftly driven back, suffering many casualties and fleeing to base with heavy loss of life.

Due to Wei Zi's death at this battle, his son Wei Zhen (卫臻) was later made a Secondary Marquis and given a position by Cao Cao.

== In Romance of the Three Kingdoms ==
In the 14th-century historical novel Romance of the Three Kingdoms, the coalition were successively victorious and pressed on Luoyang. Dong Zhuo asked his aide Li Ru for advice, and Li replied that he should move the capital to Chang'an. Dong Zhuo did so and burned Luoyang to the ground to force everyone to leave. The coalition generals saw the smoke coming from Luoyang and advanced, only to find the charred ruins of Luoyang.

Cao Cao went to Yuan Shao and said that the coalition should pursue Dong Zhuo, but Yuan replied that everybody was worn out and there would be nothing to gain by pursuing, and all the lords agreed that they should do nothing. After this Cao Cao exclaimed, "You childish buffoons are not qualified to participate in strategic planning!" Cao Cao then took Xiahou Dun, Xiahou Yuan, Cao Hong, Cao Ren, Li Dian, Yue Jin, Cao Chun and 10,000 troops to chase in pursuit.

In the novel, the road west from Luoyang to Chang'an was through Xingyang (while in reality, Xingyang was to the east of Luoyang). When Dong Zhuo reached Xingyang, Xu Rong welcomed him. Li Ru, hearing of Cao Cao's approach, suggested to lure Cao Cao into an ambush with Lü Bu. In Xingyang, Cao Cao engaged Lü Bu, as predicted, and while Xiahou Dun was duelling with Lü, Dong Zhuo's generals Li Jue and Guo Si attacked from both flanks and surrounded Cao Cao. Cao Cao ordered Xiahou Yuan and Cao Ren to hold them off, but Cao Cao's forces were eventually overwhelmed and retreated.

As Cao Cao's men were preparing to settle for the evening, Xu Rong came out of his ambush and scattered Cao's camp. Cao Cao quickly mounted his horse to escape, but he was shot in the shoulder by Xu Rong and his horse was slain. Cao Cao became captured by two enemy soldiers but Cao Hong killed them and freed his master. Cao Hong offered his horse to Cao Cao, but there was a river ahead and Cao Cao could ride no more, while Xu Rong's men drew ever closer. Cao Hong then carried Cao Cao as he waded across the river. Xu Rong's men initially fired arrows at them, but soon turned around to cross the river in a ford upstream. When Cao Cao and Cao Hong finally reached the other side of the river, Xu Rong came charging from upstream, but Xiahou Dun intercepted and killed Xu Rong on the spot. Cao Cao's forces then came together, all relieved that Cao Cao is safe, and retreated back to Yuan Shao's main camp at Henei. Dong Zhuo's remaining forces left to follow him to Chang'an.
