= Xu Rong (general) =

Chinese Han dynasty general (died 192)

- 徐榮

General of the Household (中郎將)
- In office ? – 192
- Monarch: Emperor Xian of Han

Personal details
- Born: Unknown; Liaoyang or Shenyang, Liaoning
- Died: 192; Weinan, Shaanxi
- Occupation: General

Xu Rong (died c.June 192) was a military general serving under the warlord Dong Zhuo during the late Eastern Han dynasty of China.

== Life ==
Xu Rong was from Xiangping County (襄平縣), Liaodong Commandery (遼東郡), which is around present-day Liaoyang, Liaoning, but another account claimed that he was from Xuantu Commandery, which is around present-day Shenyang, Liaoning. Very little is known about his early life. He started his career as a subordinate of the warlord Dong Zhuo, who controlled the Han central government and the figurehead Emperor Xian from 189 to 192. He held the position of a General of the Household (中郎將). During this time, he recommended Gongsun Du, who was from the same commandery as him, to serve as the Administrator of Liaodong Commandery.

In 190, Xu Rong fought on Dong Zhuo's side against a coalition of warlords from the east of Hangu Pass. He defeated Cao Cao, who joined the coalition under Zhang Miao's banner, at the Battle of Xingyang. Later that year, he defeated Sun Jian, who joined the coalition under Yuan Shu's banner, at the Battle of Liangdong (梁東). He also captured Li Min (李旻), the Administrator of Yingchuan Commandery, and killed him via boiling.

In May 192, after Dong Zhuo was assassinated in Chang'an, Xu Rong switched allegiance to the new central government led by Wang Yun. Wang Yun ordered him to lead troops to attack Dong Zhuo's former followers led by Li Jue and Guo Si. Xu Rong was killed in action at Xinfeng County (新豐縣; south of present-day Weinan, Shaanxi).

== In Romance of the Three Kingdoms ==
Xu Rong appears as a minor character in the 14th-century historical novel Romance of the Three Kingdoms, which romanticises the events before and during the Three Kingdoms period. In the novel, after Dong Zhuo relocates the imperial capital from Luoyang to Chang'an, Cao Cao sets off in pursuit of Dong Zhuo's forces. During this time, Xu Rong intercepts Cao Cao and defeats him in an ambush. Cao Cao narrowly escapes with the help of his cousin Cao Hong.

== See also ==
- Lists of people of the Three Kingdoms
