= Zhang Miao (politician) =

Chinese Han dynasty official (died 195)

- 張邈

Administrator of Chenliu (陳留太守)
- In office circa 175 – 195
- Monarch: Emperor Xian of Han

Personal details
- Born: Unknown Yanggu County, Shandong
- Died: 195
- Relations: Zhang Chao (brother)
- Occupation: Politician and warlord
- Courtesy name: Mengzhuo (孟卓)

Chinese name
- Traditional Chinese: 張邈
- Simplified Chinese: 张邈
Transcriptions
Standard Mandarin
- Hanyu Pinyin: Zhāng Miǎo
- Wade–Giles: Chang^{1} Miao^{3}
Middle Chinese
- Middle Chinese: ʈɨɐŋ mˠʌk̚
Old Chinese
- Baxter–Sagart (2014): *C.traŋ mˤrawk
- Zhengzhang: *taŋ mraːwɢ

Zhang Miao (died 195 (Note: The Zizhi Tongjian indicated that Zhang Miao died in the autumn (7th to 9th month) of the 2nd year of the Xing'ping era of Emperor Xian's reign. This corresponds to 24 Aug to 19 Nov 195 on the Julian calendar.)), courtesy name Mengzhuo, was a Chinese politician and warlord who lived in the late Eastern Han dynasty of China.

== Early life and career ==
Zhang Miao was from Shouzhang County (壽張縣), Dongping Commandery (東平郡), which is in present-day Yanggu County, Shandong. He was known for being chivalrous as a youth, and he often helped the poor and the needy. He earned much respect from the scholar-gentry for his deeds. He was also a friend of Cao Cao and Yuan Shao.

Zhang Miao was later recruited into the civil service and was commissioned as a Cavalry Commandant (騎都尉) after achieving excellent results in the imperial examination. He was subsequently promoted to be the Administrator (太守) of Chenliu Commandery (陳留郡; around present-day Kaifeng, Henan).

== Campaign against Dong Zhuo ==
In 190, Zhang Miao and Cao Cao were among the first to take up arms against Dong Zhuo, leading to the formation of a coalition and the launching of a campaign against Dong. During a battle at Bianshui (汴水), Zhang Miao sent his subordinate Wei Zi (衞茲) to lead troops to assist Cao Cao. (Note: Wei was killed at the Battle of Xingyang.) At the time, Yuan Shao, who was the coalition chief, behaved arrogantly and elicited strong criticism from Zhang Miao. Yuan Shao was furious and he told Cao Cao to kill Zhang Miao, but Cao refused and said, "Mengzhuo is our friend so we should be tolerate him. Now, the Empire has yet to be pacified, so we shouldn't start an internal conflict." Zhang Miao was very grateful to Cao Cao when he heard about it, but he also felt uneasy.

== In Yan Province ==
Later, before Cao Cao embarked on a campaign against Tao Qian in Xu Province, he instructed his family, "If I don't return, you must take shelter under Mengzhuo." After returning from the campaign, Cao Cao met Zhang Miao and they shed tears of joy. They were such close friends.

When Lü Bu left Yuan Shao to join Zhang Yang in Henei (河內; in present-day Henan), he passed by Chenliu and met Zhang Miao. Zhang Miao treated him generously and made a pledge of friendship with him when he saw him off. Yuan Shao was angry when he heard that Zhang Miao had befriended Lü Bu. Zhang Miao also feared that Cao Cao might ally with Yuan Shao to attack him so he felt very uncomfortable. Besides, his jurisdiction, Chenliu, was in Yan Province, which was under Cao Cao's control.

== Betraying Cao Cao ==
In 194, when Cao Cao was away on another campaign against Tao Qian, Zhang Miao's younger brother Zhang Chao (張超), along with Cao's subordinates Chen Gong, Xu Si (許汜) and Wang Kai (王楷), started a rebellion against Cao in Yan Province. Chen Gong successfully persuaded Zhang Miao to rebel against Cao Cao as well and invite Lü Bu into Yan Province. Chen Gong led his men from Dong Commandery (東郡; around present-day Liaocheng, Shandong) eastward to meet Lü Bu and they occupied Puyang (濮陽; in present-day Puyang, Henan). Lü Bu was declared Governor of Yan Province (兖州牧). The various commanderies and counties in Yan Province responded to Lü Bu's call and defected to his side, except for Juancheng, Dong'e and Fan counties, which still remained under Cao Cao's control.

Upon receiving news of the revolt and Lü Bu's intrusion, Cao Cao aborted the Xu Province campaign and headed back to Yan Province, where the forces of Lü Bu and Cao Cao clashed in Puyang. Cao Cao was unable to overcome Lü Bu and both sides were locked in a stalemate for over 100 days. Around the time, the area was plagued by locusts and droughts so the people suffered from famine and many had resorted to cannibalism to survive. Lü Bu moved his base further east to Shanyang (山陽; in present-day southern Shandong). Within two years, Cao Cao managed to take back all his territories in Yan Province and he defeated Lü Bu in a battle at Juye County. Lü Bu fled to Xu Province and took refuge under Liu Bei.

== Death ==
Zhang Miao followed Lü Bu after they were defeated by Cao Cao in Yan Province. He left his brother Zhang Chao and their family behind in Yongqiu (雍丘; present-day Qi County, Henan). Zhang Miao went to seek help from Yuan Shu but was killed by his own men before he reached his destination. Cao Cao besieged Yongqiu for some months and eventually conquered it, after which he executed Zhang Miao's clan.

The Xiandi Chunqiu (獻帝春秋) recorded that Yuan Shu once discussed with Zhang Miao and others about proclaiming himself emperor – which he did in early 197. Zhang Miao dissuaded Yuan Shu from doing so. Pei Songzhi, who annotated Zhang Miao's biography in the Sanguozhi, commented that there was some ambiguity in the Xiandi Chunqiu account because Zhang Miao's biography stated that he was killed by his own men before he arrived at Yuan Shu's place even though it was possible that he met Yuan earlier.

== See also ==
- Lists of people of the Three Kingdoms
