= Henei (disambiguation) =

Henei may refer to:

1. Henei, the Chinese name of Hanoi, a city in Vietnam.
2. Henei Commandery, an ancient administrative division (or commandery) in China, situated in present-day northern Henan.
