= AD 152 =

152 in various calendars
- Gregorian calendar: 152; CLII
- Ab urbe condita: 905
- Assyrian calendar: 4902
- Balinese saka calendar: 73–74
- Bengali calendar: −442 – −441
- Berber calendar: 1102
- Buddhist calendar: 696
- Burmese calendar: −486
- Byzantine calendar: 5660–5661
- Chinese calendar: 辛卯年 (Metal Rabbit); 2849 or 2642 — to — 壬辰年 (Water Dragon); 2850 or 2643
- Coptic calendar: −132 – −131
- Discordian calendar: 1318
- Ethiopian calendar: 144–145
- Hebrew calendar: 3912–3913
- Hindu calendars
- Vikram Samvat: 208–209
- Shaka Samvat: 73–74
- Kali Yuga: 3252–3253
- Holocene calendar: 10152
- Iranian calendar: 470 BP – 469 BP
- Islamic calendar: 484 BH – 483 BH
- Javanese calendar: 27–28
- Julian calendar: 152; CLII
- Korean calendar: 2485
- Minguo calendar: 1760 before ROC 民前1760年
- Nanakshahi calendar: −1316
- Seleucid era: 463/464 AG
- Thai solar calendar: 694–695
- Tibetan calendar: ལྕགས་མོ་ཡོས་ལོ་ (female Iron-Hare); 278 or −103 or −875 — to — ཆུ་ཕོ་འབྲུག་ལོ་ (male Water-Dragon); 279 or −102 or −874

Year 152 (CLII) was a leap year starting on Friday of the Julian calendar. At the time, it was known in Rome as the Year of the Consulship of Glabrio and Homullus (or, less frequently, year 905 Ab urbe condita). The denomination 152 for this year has been used since the early medieval period, when the Anno Domini calendar era became the prevalent method in Europe for naming years.

== Events ==
=== By place ===
==== Asia ====
- The Chinese domination of the Tarim Basin weakens.

== Births ==
- Bao Xin, Chinese general and warlord (d. 192)

== Deaths ==
- January 14 – Markianos, patriarch of Alexandria
- Yan Ming, Chinese empress of the Han dynasty
