= Battle of Xingyang =

The Battle of Xingyang may refer to:

- Battle of Xingyang (205 BC), a battle fought between Xiang Yu and Liu Bang in the Chu–Han contention period
- Battle of Xingyang (190), a battle fought between the Guandong Coalition and Dong Zhuo during the Han dynasty
