= Bao Xun =

Cao Wei politician and general (died 226)

- 鮑勛

Right General of the Household (右中郎將)
- In office c.220 – 226
- Monarch: Cao Pi

Personal details
- Born: Unknown Xintai, Shandong
- Died: c.9 June 226 Luoyang, Henan
- Parent: Bao Xin (father)
- Occupation: Politician
- Courtesy name: Shuye (叔業)

Bao Xun (died c.9 June 226), courtesy name Shuye, was a Chinese politician of the state of Cao Wei during the Three Kingdoms period of China. He was appointed as a minister by Cao Cao in recognition of his father Bao Xin, who was killed in action against the Yellow Turban rebels. Bao Xun was known to be an outspoken minister who would not hesitate to criticise anyone for their mistakes, including his lord. The Wei emperor Cao Pi was frustrated and angry with Bao Xun for his outspoken nature that he demoted Bao several times during his reign. Eventually, Cao Pi grew tired of Bao Xun and ordered his execution.

== Family ==
Born in Pingyang, Taishan, Bao Xun was the ninth generation descendant of a capital general in the Han dynasty named Bao Xuan, some of whose offspring moved from Shangdang to Taishan and settled thereafter. Bao Xun's father, Bao Xin, was killed in a battle with Yellow Turban Army in the Province of Yan but saved Cao Cao's life with his sacrifice. Earlier, his uncle Bao Tao (Bao Xin's younger brother) was killed during the Battle of Xingyang. Bao Xun's elder brother, Bao Shao, was anointed the Marquis of Xinduting by Cao Cao in the seventeenth year of Jian'an (Eastern Han) (212 CE) as remembrance of his father's contribution.

== Service under Cao Pi ==
In the twenty-second year of Jian'an, when Cao Pi was appointed as the heir to Cao Cao, Bao Xun became an educator to Cao Pi. That Bao did not yield to Cao Pi's power and performed his duty fairly agitated Cao Pi throughout his reign. An incident triggered the distaste of Cao Pi when his brother-in-law, a petty official of Qu Zhou, was found stealing some cloths from official inventory. Regardless of Cao Pi's couple of letters to beg for pardon on behalf of his brother-in-law, Bao did not conceal the crime which should have sentenced whom to death, by which Cao Pi was further agitated, to an extent that he secretly ordered other civil servants to report Bao and caused Bao to lose his governmental post.

After Cao Pi's succession to Cao Cao's lordship and subsequently the empire from the Han dynasty, Bao Xun repeatedly emphasized the priority of army, agriculture and benevolence rule over palace constructions.

Throughout Cao Pi's reign, Bao Xun had twice confronted severely with Cao Pi. The first one was on hunting as imperial leisure and the second one on military expedition. In both cases, Bao held a remarkable opposition against his monarch.

At one time, Cao Pi went for gaming while Bao halted Cao's vehicle for protest, stating the importance of virtuous rule over hunting. Cao nevertheless went after destroying Bao's protest letter with his bare hands. In the midst of this hunting, Cao asked his subordinates to compare the joy of music with that of hunting. While Liu Ye replied that hunting was more joyful than music, Bao protested with his statement that music had the peaceful and educational nature; in contrary, hunting brought harm to lives and danger to the monarch. Thus, he accused Liu for flattery, requesting an appraisal of his wrongdoing, by which Cao felt deeply annoyed to a point that he immediately returned and lowered Bao's rank to a minor official.

In late May or early June 226, Bao Xun deliberately hid a report by Liu Yao (刘曜) that implicated Sun Yong (孙邕) in a potentially dangerous breach of protocol when the latter visited Cao Pi. After Bao Xun's trial, Cao Pi resolved to kill him; despite petitions of clemency from many Cao Wei officials, including Zhong Yao, Hua Xin, Chen Qun, Xin Pi, Wei Zhen (卫臻) and Gao Rou, Bao Xun was still executed.

== See also ==
- Lists of people of the Three Kingdoms
- Chinese Text Project. Records of the Three Kingdoms (Sanguozhi). Fascicle 12 Biography of Bao Xun.
