= Xu Rong =

Xu Rong may refer to:

- Xu Rong (general) (died 192), military general serving under the warlord Dong Zhuo
- Xu Rong (badminton) (born 1958), retired female badminton player from China
- Xu (state) (徐), whose people were referred to as Xu Rong by the Zhou dynasty
