= Sun Fen =

Eastern Wu Marquis of Zhang'an (died 274)

Sun Fen 孫奮

Marquis of Zhang'an (章安侯)
- Tenure: August or September 258–270 or 274

Prince of Qi (齊王)
- Tenure: January or February 252 – 253
- Born: between 224 and 235
- Died: 270 or 274 (Note: Vol.80 of Zizhi Tongjian dated Sun Fen's death to between the 4th and 6th months of the 10th year of the Taishi era; this corresponds to 23 May (1st day of the 4th month) to 19 Aug (30th day of the 6th month) 274 in the Julian calendar.)
- Spouse: Lady Yuan (daughter of Yuan Yao and granddaughter of Yuan Shu)
- Issue: five sons
Names
- Family name: Sun (孫); Given name: Fen (奮); Courtesy name: Ziyang (子揚)
- House: House of Sun
- Father: Sun Quan
- Mother: Consort Zhong

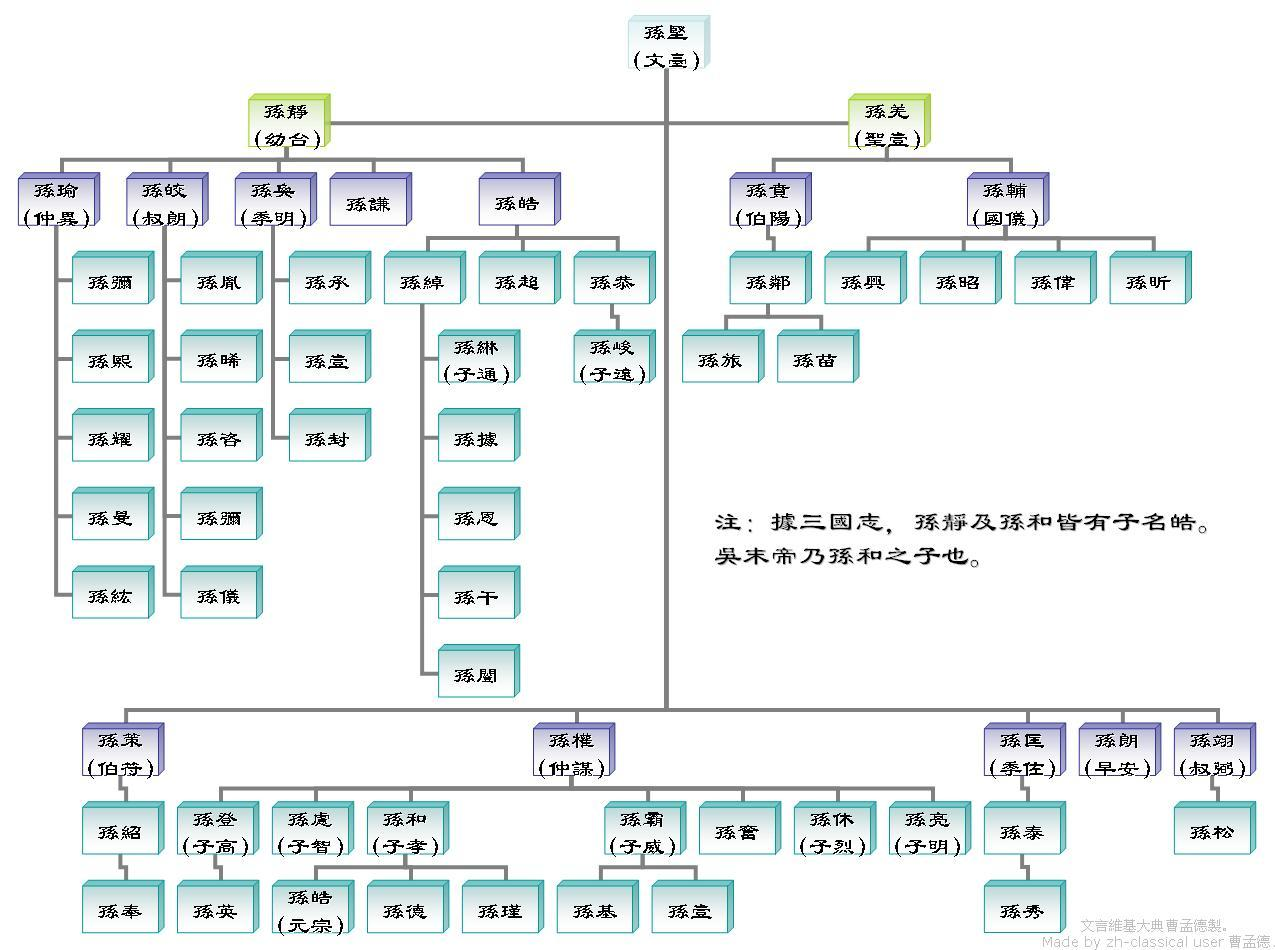
Family tree of the Sun clan; Sun Fen is seen in the 2nd row from bottom, between Sun Ba (Ziwei) and Sun Xiu (Zilie)

Sun Fen (before 235 (Note: While Sun Fen's birth year was not recorded, he was older than Sun Xiu (who was born in 235) and younger than Sun He (who was born in 224)) - 270 (Note: This death year is per Sun Fen's biography in Sanguozhi (2nd year of the Jian'heng era).) or 274 (Note: This death year was recorded in Zizhi Tongjian (10th year of the Tai'shi era of the reign of Emperor Wu of Jin). In Zizhi Tongjian Kaoyi, Sima Guang pointed out that Chen Shou wrote in Sun Hao's biography in Sanguozhi that in 274 (3rd year of the Fenghuang era), rumours arose in Kuaiji that Sun Fen would become emperor; this account wouldn't make sense if Sun Fen had died in 270. Thus, Zizhi Tongjian dated Sun Fen's death to 274, when Xi Xi (奚熙; Administrator of Linhai) died as a result of discussing the rumours with Guo Dan (郭诞; Administrator of Kuaiji). Sima Guang also noted that Sanshi Guo Chunqiu and Jin Chunqiu recorded that Sun Fen was killed in 275 (1st year of the Tiance era).)), courtesy name Ziyang, was an imperial prince of the state of Eastern Wu during the Three Kingdoms period of China. He was the fifth son of Sun Quan, the founding emperor of Eastern Wu.

== Life ==
Sun Fen was the fifth son of Sun Quan, a warlord who lived in the late Eastern Han dynasty and became the founding emperor of the Eastern Wu state in the Three Kingdoms period. His mother was Consort Zhong (仲姬), a concubine of Sun Quan. In late January or February 252, he received the noble title "Prince of Qi" (齊王) and took up residence in Wuchang (武昌; present-day Ezhou, Hubei).

Following Sun Quan's death in May 252, the Grand Tutor Zhuge Ke, who had been appointed regent for Sun Quan's youngest son and successor, Sun Liang, proposed to the imperial court to move the nobles away from areas with a heavy military presence. He thus relocated Sun Fen from Wuchang to Yuzhang Commandery (豫章郡; around present-day Nanchang, Jiangxi). However, Sun Fen turned furious when he heard about it and refused to move out of Wuchang. Zhuge Ke wrote a long letter to Sun Fen to warn him about the perils of not knowing his place and to remind him of the downfall of his fourth brother, Sun Ba, the Prince of Lu.

Sun Fen became fearful after reading Zhuge Ke's letter so he meekly obliged and moved to Nanchang, the capital of Yuzhang Commandery. While he was in Yuzhang Commandery, he led such a carefree and extravagant lifestyle that the officials around him could not stand him. When he heard that Zhuge Ke had been ousted from power in a coup d'état in 253, he travelled to Wuhu County (蕪湖縣; east of present-day Wuhu, Anhui) and wanted to enter the imperial capital, Jianye (present-day Nanjing, Jiangsu), to observe the situation in the imperial court. When a senior official Xie Ci (謝慈) tried to dissuade him from doing so, Sun Fen had him executed. Sun Fen was subsequently stripped of his noble title and reduced to commoner status as punishment for executing a senior official without permission from the imperial court. He was also relocated to Zhang'an County (章安縣; present-day Jiaojiang District, Taizhou, Zhejiang). However, in August or September 258, (Note: According to Sun Liang's biography in Sanguozhi, Sun Fen was made Marquis of Zhang'an in the 7th month of the 3rd year of the Taiping era. This corresponds to 17 Aug to 14 Sep 258 in the Julian calendar.) the emperor Sun Liang issued an imperial decree to pardon Sun Fen for his earlier offence and restore him to noble status as the Marquis of Zhang'an (章安侯). About two months later, Sun Liang was deposed in a coup and replaced with Sun Xiu. Sun Fen's activities during Sun Xiu's reign were poorly documented. Sun Xiu died in September 264; Sun Hao (son of Fen's half-brother Sun He) became emperor.

In 270 or 274, Sun Hao was deeply grieved when his favourite concubine, Lady Wang, died of illness, so he remained indoors for many months and refused to meet his subjects. At the time, there were rumours that Sun Hao was dead and that either Sun Fen or Sun Feng (孫奉; a grandson of Sun Ce, via Ce's son Sun Shao) would become the new emperor. Zhang Jun (張俊), the Administrator of Yuzhang Commandery, believed the rumours and hoped that Sun Fen or Sun Feng would become the new emperor, so he sent his men to clean up the tomb of Lady Zhong (Sun Fen's mother) and Sun Feng's mother in Yuzhang Commandery in an attempt to please Sun Fen and Sun Feng. (Note: It is likely that the events in 270 leading to Zhang Jun's downfall were rumours linking Sun Feng to the throne, and that it was Sun Feng and his family members who died in that year. Sun Ce's biography in Sanguozhi only recorded that Sun Feng was executed because of rumours linking him to the throne, without indicating the year or providing further context.) When Sun Hao found out, he was so angry that he had Zhang Jun arrested and executed by dismemberment. Zhang Jun's family members were also put to death. Sun Fen and his family were implicated, arrested and condemned to death. When he pleaded with Sun Hao to spare him and his five sons and allow them to live the rest of their lives as beggars, Sun Hao refused and forced them to commit suicide by consuming poison. (Note: Pei Songzhi is skeptical of the claim that Sun Fen died in 270. He argued that Sun Hao had just recently ascended the throne and yet to establish himself. If Sun Fen's children were around 20 (by East Asian reckoning) when Fen was not yet targeted by Hao, then they couldn't have been 30 or 40 (by East Asian reckoning) when Fen died. Also, if Fen's children were already adults, then if they were still unwedded, the reason wouldn't have been Hao's imprisonment.)

== See also ==
- Lists of people of the Three Kingdoms
- Eastern Wu family trees
