= Bao Xin =

Han dynasty general and warlord (152–192)

- 鮑信

Chancellor of Jibei (濟北相)
- In office 191–192
- Monarch: Emperor Xian of Han

General Who Destroys Barbarians (破虜將軍) (acting)
- In office 190–191
- Monarch: Emperor Xian of Han

Cavalry Commandant (騎都尉)
- In office ?–189
- Monarch: Emperor Ling of Han

Personal details
- Born: 152 Xintai, Shandong
- Died: 192 (aged 40) Dongping County, Shandong
- Relations: Bao Tao (younger brother)
- Children: Bao Shao; Bao Xun
- Parent: Bao Dan (father)
- Occupation: General, politician, warlord

Bao Xin (152–192) was a Chinese military general, politician, and warlord who lived during the late Eastern Han dynasty of China.

== Life ==
Bao Xin was from Pingyang County (平陽縣), Taishan Commandery (泰山郡), which is present-day Xintai County, Shandong. His father, Bao Dan (鮑丹), served as a Palace Attendant in the central Han government. Bao Xin started his official career during the reign of Emperor Ling (r. 168–189) and served as a Cavalry Commandant (騎都尉).

Around 189, the general He Jin sent Bao Xin back to Taishan Commandery to recruit soldiers to serve in the imperial army. However, before Bao Xin completed his mission, He Jin was assassinated by the eunuch faction, and the warlord Dong Zhuo had taken advantage of the political vacuum to seize control of the Han central government in Luoyang. Bao Xin saw Dong Zhuo as a serious threat to the Han Empire, so he did not return to Luoyang.

In early 190, a coalition of warlords from the east of Hangu Pass started a military campaign aimed at freeing the central government and the figurehead Emperor Xian from Dong Zhuo's control. Bao Xin brought along his younger brother Bao Tao (鮑韜) and his own troops to join the coalition and was appointed as acting General Who Destroys Barbarians (破虜將軍). The warlords nominated Yuan Shao, who had the highest prestige among them, to be their leader. Bao Xin, however, saw great potential in another warlord Cao Cao and befriended him. Later, Bao Xin and Cao Cao fought together at the Battle of Bian River (汴水) against Dong Zhuo's forces and suffered a great defeat; Bao Xin's brother Bao Tao was killed in action and Bao Xin himself was wounded.

After the coalition broke up, Bao Xin advised Cao Cao to establish his own base in the Henan region, while other warlords such as Yuan Shao and Gongsun Zan were fighting over territories. In 191, after Yuan Shao recommended Cao Cao to be the Administrator (太守) of Dong Commandery (東郡; around present-day Puyang, Henan), Cao Cao in turn nominated Bao Xin to be the Chancellor (相) of the neighbouring Jibei State (濟北國; around present-day Feicheng, Shandong).

In 192, when thousands of former Yellow Turban rebels swarmed into Yan Province from Qing Province, Liu Dai, the Inspector of Yan Province, wanted to lead government forces to attack the rebels. Bao Xin advised Liu Dai against doing so because the rebels had superiority in numbers, but Liu Dai ignored him, went ahead and was killed in battle. Bao Xin then recommended Cao Cao to be the Governor of Yan Province to replace Liu Dai and take the lead in the fight against the rebels. Bao Xin and Cao Cao then led their troops to the east of Shouzhang County (壽張縣; southwest of present-day Dongping County, Shandong) to attack the rebels. During this time, they came under a sudden attack by the rebels and were overwhelmed. Bao Xin fought bravely to cover Cao Cao while he escaped, but ended up sacrificing himself in the process. After Cao Cao broke out of the encirclement, he reorganised his troops and returned to the battlefield to search for Bao Xin's body but could not find it. He then ordered his men to carve a wooden statue in Bao Xin's likeness and held a memorial service for Bao Xin, during which he wept bitterly. The rebels eventually surrendered to Cao Cao, who recruited them to form the elite Qingzhou Army.

Bao Xin was 41 years old (by East Asian age reckoning) when he died. As he led a frugal life and used his personal wealth to help his subordinates, his family did not own much property at the time of his death. In 212, Cao Cao wrote a memorial to Emperor Xian, asking him to honour Bao Xin and confer the title of a village marquis on Bao Shao (鮑邵), one of Bao Xin's sons. Cao Cao also recruited Bao Xun, another of Bao Xin's sons, to serve as an official under him. Bao Xun continued serving as an official in the state of Cao Wei during the Three Kingdoms period.

== See also ==
- Lists of people of the Three Kingdoms
