= Hua Xiong =

Chinese military general (died 191)

- 華雄

Chief Controller (都督)
- In office 190–191
- Monarch: Emperor Xian of Han
- Chancellor: Dong Zhuo

Personal details
- Born: Unknown
- Died: 191 Yangren (陽人; near present-day Wenquan, Ruzhou, Henan)

Hua Xiong
- Traditional Chinese: 華雄
- Simplified Chinese: 华雄
Transcriptions
Standard Mandarin
- Hanyu Pinyin: Huà Xióng
- Wade–Giles: Hua Hsiung

Hua Xiong (died 191), also recorded in the annotated version of Zizhi Tongjian as Ye Xiong (葉雄), was a military general serving under the warlord Dong Zhuo during the late Eastern Han dynasty of China.

== Life ==
Little is recorded about Hua Xiong in history, apart from the fact that he served as a military officer under the warlord Dong Zhuo and held the position of Chief Controller (都督) or Commandant (都尉). In early 190, when a coalition of warlords from the east of Hangu Pass launched a military campaign in the name of freeing the Han central government from Dong Zhuo's control, Hua Xiong led Dong Zhuo's forces to engage the enemy. Hu Zhen and Lü Bu were quarrelsome, so Sun Jian could easily defeat both of them and beheaded their Chief Controller Hua Xiong in a battle at Yangren (陽人; believed to be near present-day Wenquan, Ruzhou, Henan).

== In Romance of the Three Kingdoms ==
Hua Xiong plays a more significant role in the 14th-century historical novel Romance of the Three Kingdoms. He is described as a "stalwart man of fierce mien, lithe and supple as a beast. He had a round head like a leopard and shoulders like an ape's."

In Chapter 5, as warlords from the east of Hangu Pass form a coalition against Dong Zhuo, Hua Xiong stations at Sishui Pass to ward off the oncoming attack. When Lü Bu requests to lead troops to attack the enemy, Hua Xiong steps in and says, "An ox-cleaver to kill a chicken! There is no need for the General to go. I will cut off their heads as easily as I would take a thing out of my pocket!" Dong Zhuo then puts Hua Xiong in charge.

Having single-handedly slain four warriors from the coalition – Zu Mao (祖茂), Pan Feng (潘鳳), Bao Zhong (鮑忠), and Yu She (俞涉) – Hua Xiong seems invincible. Despite mistrust from many warlords of the coalition, most notably their leader Yuan Shao, Guan Yu volunteers to fight Hua Xiong. To convince them to give him the opportunity, he tells them that if he fails to defeat Hua Xiong, the coalition can take his head as punishment. When Cao Cao pours Guan Yu a cup of warm wine, Guan Yu puts it on hold and says he will return very soon victorious. As promised, Guan Yu returns quickly with Hua Xiong's head, whilst Cao Cao who was still holding the cup of wine, realised just how quickly it took Guan Yu to slay Hua Xiong. Cao Cao then gives the cup of wine - still warm - to Guan Yu who gulps down the wine victoriously. This is known as 溫酒斬華雄 (pinyin: Wēn jiǔ zhǎn Huá Xióng; lit. 'Slaying Hua Xiong while the wine remains warm').

== See also ==
- Lists of people of the Three Kingdoms
