= Qiao Xuan =

Han dynasty official and general (110-184)

- 橋玄

Household Counsellor (光祿大夫)
- In office ? – June 6, 184
- Monarch: Emperor Ling of Han

Minister over the Masses (司徒)
- In office ?–?
- Monarch: Emperor Ling of Han

Minister of Works (司空)
- In office 170 – ?
- Monarch: Emperor Ling of Han

Minister Herald (大鴻臚)
- In office ?–?
- Monarch: Emperor Ling of Han

Minister Steward (少府)
- In office ?–?
- Monarch: Emperor Ling of Han

Intendant of Henan (河南尹)
- In office ?–?
- Monarch: Emperor Ling of Han

Personal details
- Born: 110 (Note: The Houhanshu recorded that Qiao Xuan died in the 6th year of the Guanghe era (178–184) of Emperor Ling's reign at the age of 75 (by East Asian age reckoning). By calculation, his birth year should be around 109. However, a tablet Cai Yong wrote for Qiao Xuan stated that Qiao Xuan died on 6 June 184 (jiayin day of the 5th month of the 7th year of the Guang'he era).) Shangqiu, Henan
- Died: 6 June 184 (aged 74)
- Relations: Qiao Mao (relative)
- Children: Qiao Yu; at least one other son
- Parent: Qiao Su (father)
- Occupation: Official
- Courtesy name: Gongzu (公祖)

Qiao Xuan (110 – 6 June 184), courtesy name Gongzu, was an influential official during the Eastern Han dynasty of China.

Born in a scholarly family, he began his career as a local county officer and eventually gained fame for his sense of justice. His career included roles as Left Commandant in Luoyang, Chancellor of the Qi State, and Administrator of various commanderies. Qiao Xuan was known for his sternness, but also for his humility and respect towards others. He had a keen eye for talent and was one of the first to recognize the potential of Cao Cao, a warlord who later rose to power.

Although he is associated with the Qiao sisters in the novel "Romance of the Three Kingdoms," historical records suggest that it is unlikely that he was their father.

== Family background ==
Qiao Xuan was born in the Eastern Han dynasty during the reign of Emperor An (r. 106–125 CE). He was from Suiyang County (睢陽縣) in the Liang State (梁國; south of present-day Shangqiu, Henan) and came from a scholar-gentry background. His ancestor, Qiao Ren (橋仁), who lived seven generations before him, served as a Minister Herald (大鴻臚) during the reign of Emperor Cheng (r. 33–7 BCE). Qiao Ren, who was nicknamed "Scholar Qiao" (橋君學), also wrote 49 volumes of the Li Ji Zhangju (禮記章句; Verses from the Book of Rites). Qiao Xuan's grandfather, Qiao Ji (橋基), served as the Administrator (太守) of Guangling Commandery (廣陵郡), while Qiao Xuan's father, Qiao Su (橋肅), served as the Administrator of Donglai Commandery (東萊郡).

== Early career ==
In his youth, Qiao Xuan served as an Officer of Merit (功曹) in the local county office. When Zhou Jing (周景), the Inspector (刺史) of Yu Province, visited the Liang State, Qiao Xuan reported to him the crimes of Yang Chang (羊昌), the Chancellor (相) of the Chen State (陳國; around present-day Zhoukou, Henan). Zhou Jing ordered Qiao Xuan to conduct an investigation so Qiao Xuan detained Yang Chang and wrote a thorough list of Yang Chang's offences. The general Liang Ji, an influential figure in the central government, favoured Yang Chang, so he wrote an urgent letter to Zhou Jing, asking him to release Yang Chang. Zhou Jing feared Liang Ji so he obliged and instructed Qiao Xuan to free Yang Chang. However, Qiao Xuan returned the letter and ordered his men to escort Yang Chang as a prisoner to the imperial capital, Luoyang. Qiao Xuan became famous after this incident.

Qiao Xuan was later nominated as a xiaolian and appointed as a Left Commandant (左尉) in Luoyang. His superior, the Intendant of Henan (河南尹), was Liang Ji's brother, Liang Buyi (梁不疑). Liang Buyi made life difficult for Qiao Xuan because of Yang Chang's case and often found excuses to humiliate Qiao Xuan. Qiao Xuan eventually resigned and returned to his hometown.

== Mid career ==
Qiao Xuan later became the Chancellor (相) of the Qi State (齊國; around present-day Zibo, Shandong). On one occasion, he committed an offence and stripped of his post and sent to perform hard labour. After serving his sentence, he was allowed to rejoin the civil service and appointed as the Administrator (太守) of Shanggu Commandery (上谷郡; around present-day Yanqing District, Beijing) and later as the Administrator of Hanyang Commandery (漢陽郡; around present-day Tianshui, Gansu). While he was in office, Qiao Xuan heard that Huangfu Zhen (皇甫禎), the Prefect (令) of Shanggui County (上邽縣; in present-day Tianshui, Gansu), was guilty of corruption. He had Huangfu Zhen arrested, flogged, and head shaved bald. Huangfu Zhen later died in Ji County (冀縣; present-day Gangu County, Gansu). This incident shocked everyone in the region. Around the time, Qiao Xuan heard of Jiang Qi (姜岐), a famous man who lived in Shanggui County, and wanted to recruit him to join the civil service. Jiang Qi claimed that he was ill and declined. Qiao Xuan was angered, so he sent Yin Yi (尹益) to pressure Jiang Qi into agreeing. He threatened to make Jiang Qi's mother marry another man if he refused again. Yin Yi conveyed Qiao Xuan's threat to Jiang Qi but Jiang still declined and claimed that he was sick. The Counsellors (士大夫) in the commandery came to see Qiao Xuan and managed to persuade him to stop forcing Jiang Qi. This incident became the subject of jokes at the time. Qiao Xuan resigned on the grounds that he was ill. Shortly after, he joined the civil service again as a Chief Clerk (長史) to the Minister over the Masses (司徒). He was subsequently promoted to Court Architect (將作大匠).

Towards the end of the reign of Emperor Huan (r. 146–168), the Xianbei, Southern Xiongnu and Goguryeo often made incursions into Liaodong. Qiao Xuan was appointed General Who Enters Liao(dong) (度遼將軍) and put in charge of defending Liaodong. He served there for three years, repelled intrusions by the invaders, and maintained peace in the area.

In the early reign of Emperor Ling (r. 168–189), Qiao Xuan was summoned to the imperial capital Luoyang, where he served consecutively as the Intendant of Henan (河南尹), Minister Steward (少府) and Minister Herald (大鴻臚). In 170, he was promoted to Minister of Works (司空) and later to Minister over the Masses (司徒). He could not get along well with Chen Qiu (陳球), the Administrator of Nanyang Commandery (南陽郡; around present-day Nanyang, Henan), but when he was in the two top ministerial positions, he recommended Chen to serve as the Minister of Justice (廷尉). Qiao Xuan saw that the Han dynasty was too weak because the government was plagued by corruption. He despaired as he felt that he could not do anything, so he claimed to be ill and resigned.

== Later life and death ==
In his later years, Qiao Xuan entered office again as the Prefect of the Masters of Writing (尚書令). Around the time, he discovered that Gai Sheng (蓋升), to whom Emperor Huan was indebted, had abused his power when he was serving as the Administrator of Nanyang Commandery (南陽郡; around present-day Nanyang, Henan), and had amassed a large fortune from corrupt dealings. Qiao Xuan wrote a memorial to Emperor Ling, requesting the emperor to remove Gai Sheng from office and confiscate his property, but Emperor Ling refused. Qiao Xuan was subsequently reassigned to be a Palace Attendant (侍中), but he delayed the process as he was ill. Emperor Ling then ordered him to be a Household Counsellor (光祿大夫) instead. In 178, he was appointed Grand Commandant (太尉) but he rejected the position because he was sick. He remained as a Household Counsellor while receiving medical treatment.

Qiao Xuan died in 184 at the age of 75 (by East Asian age reckoning).

== Kidnap of Qiao Xuan's son ==
When Qiao Xuan's youngest son was ten years old, he ventured out alone and was kidnapped by three robbers. The robbers, holding the boy hostage, broke into Qiao Xuan's house and demanded a ransom but Qiao Xuan refused to pay them. Yang Qiu (陽球), the Colonel-Director of Retainers (司隷校尉), along with the Intendant of Henan (河南尹) and the Prefect of Luoyang (洛陽令), led several soldiers to surround Qiao Xuan's house. Yang Qiu did not order his men to advance further because he was worried that the robbers would harm Qiao Xuan's son. However, Qiao Xuan shouted, "Such criminals have no humanity! I'll not let these criminals have their way just for the sake of my son!" He then instructed the soldiers to force their way in and attack the robbers. The robbers were killed but Qiao Xuan's son also died in the struggle. Qiao Xuan later wrote a memorial to the imperial court, requesting for the following law to be implemented: "Any person who takes another person hostage should be killed. No ransom is to be paid, so as to deny an opportunity for criminals to make pecuniary gains." The imperial court approved. Since after the reign of Emperor An (r. 106–125), law enforcement had weakened. Many kidnapping and hostage-taking incidents occurred in the imperial capital and even the family members of government officials and influential persons became victims. However, after the case of Qiao Xuan's son, such incidents never happened again.

== Relationship with Cao Cao ==
When Cao Cao, a warlord who rose to power towards the end of the Han dynasty, was still a relative nobody in his early years, he visited Qiao Xuan on one occasion. Qiao Xuan was surprised to see Cao Cao and he told him, "The world is about to enter a state of chaos. You're the person who will restore peace and order!" At the time, Qiao Xuan and He Yong were the only two persons who recognised Cao Cao's extraordinary talents. Cao Cao later often said that Qiao Xuan was someone who really understood him. The Wei Shu (魏書) recorded that Qiao Xuan told Cao Cao, "I've seen many famous persons but I've never seen someone like you before! You should work hard. I'm old already! I hope to be able to entrust my family to you." Cao Cao's fame increased after his meeting with Qiao Xuan. The Shishuo Xinyu recorded that when Qiao Xuan met Cao Cao, who was still a youth then, he told him, "The world is in chaos and warlords are fighting for supremacy. Aren't you the person who will eliminate all of them and restore order? You're actually a hero in chaotic times but a villain in times of peace. It's a pity that I'm old already because I won't be able to see you become wealthy and powerful. I entrust my descendants to you." Qiao Xuan also recommended Cao Cao to see Xu Shao, a well-known commentator and character evaluator.

After Qiao Xuan's death, whenever Cao Cao passed by Qiao Xuan's tomb, he would mourn Qiao Xuan and pay his respects. He wrote a eulogy for Qiao Xuan:

The late Grand Commandant Qiao Xuan was a man of principles and virtues, one who was kind and compassionate. The State is grateful to him for his sermons while scholars learn from his lessons. Rest his soul in Heaven; we have fond memories of him. In my younger days, when I was stubborn and obstreperous, I visited him and he received me well. The encouragement he gave me was equivalent to that of Confucius remarking that none of his other students could replace Yan Hui, and that of Li Sheng (李生) praising Jia Fu (賈復). As the saying goes, 'a scholar will die for someone who understands him', I have never forgotten what he said to me. I remember he once told me, "After I die, if you pass by my grave and don't offer a jar of wine and a chicken as sacrifices to me, you'll get a stomachache after your carriage moves another three steps. Don't blame me if that really happens." Although that was light-hearted humour, if we were not very close at that time, how would he have cracked such a joke? Now, as I recall these old memories, I feel grief and sorrow. I am now on an eastern campaign and my army is garrisoned in this village. I am looking at the lands in the north, but my thoughts are at his grave. I hereby offer him these sacrifices and I hope he enjoys them!

== Family ==
One of Qiao Xuan's sons, Qiao Yu (橋羽), served as the Chancellor (相) of the Rencheng State (任城國; around present-day Zoucheng, Shandong).

== Appraisal ==
Qiao Xuan was known to be an impatient and impulsive person who did not take the big picture into consideration. However, he led a humble and simple life, and treated people with respect. He did not abuse his status and power by helping any of his family members and relatives gain high-ranking positions in the civil service. When he died, his family did not own much property and no funeral was held for him. His humility earned him praise at the time.

The historian Fan Ye, who wrote Qiao Xuan's biography, commented on him as follows: "Qiao Xuan established his authority and was known for his sternness, but he was lacking in his personal relations with others." When commenting on Qiao Xuan spotting Cao Cao's talent, Fan Ye wrote: "Qiao Xuan had the privilege of being the first to recognise a hero."

== In Romance of the Three Kingdoms ==
In the 14th-century historical novel Romance of the Three Kingdoms, Qiao Xuan is said to be the father of the two Qiao sisters, though there is little to no historical evidence to support this claim. Also in the novel, he is referred to as "Qiao Guolao" (喬國老; literally "State Elder Qiao"). He appears in chapter 54 in the events leading to the marriage between Liu Bei and Sun Shangxiang.

The 3rd-century historical text Records of the Three Kingdoms did not state the name of the Qiao sisters' father, who was simply referred to as "Qiao Gong" (橋公; literally "Elder Qiao"). Historically, Qiao Xuan died in 184 while the Qiao sisters married Sun Ce and Zhou Yu in 200, so it was not possible that Qiao Xuan was still living when the marriages took place. Therefore, it is highly unlikely that Qiao Xuan was the "Qiao Gong" mentioned in the Records of the Three Kingdoms.

The marriage between Liu Bei and Lady Sun took place sometime in 209 or 210, so Qiao Xuan's role in the events leading to the marriage is fictitious as he was already dead for over 20 years then.

== See also ==
- Lists of people of the Three Kingdoms
