= Wang Kuang =

Han dynasty warlord and official (died c.191)

- 王匡
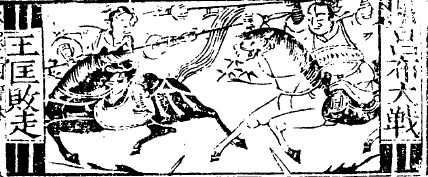
- Wang Kuang (left) fleeing from Lü Bu in a Ming dynasty illustration from Sanguo zhizhuan pinglin (三國志傳評林)

Administrator of Henei (河內太守)
- In office 189 – 191
- Monarch: Emperor Xian of Han
- Preceded by: Zhu Jun
- Succeeded by: Zhang Yang

Personal details
- Born: Unknown; Tai'an, Shandong
- Died: c. 191
- Relations: Humu Ban's wife (sister)
- Occupation: Official, warlord
- Courtesy name: Gongjie (公節)

Wang Kuang (died c. 191), courtesy name Gongjie, was a government official and minor warlord who lived during the late Eastern Han dynasty of China.

== Life ==
Wang Kuang started his career as a subordinate of the general He Jin during the reign of Emperor Ling (r. 168–189). Following Emperor Ling's death in 189, He Jin was assassinated by the rival eunuch faction, after which Wang Kuang briefly resigned and lived as a commoner. Within the same year, however, he returned to government service and was soon appointed as the Administrator (太守) of Henei Commandery (河內郡; covering parts of present-day Henan, Hebei and Shanxi).

In early 190, Wang Kuang joined a coalition of warlords from the east of Hangu Pass in a campaign against the warlord Dong Zhuo, who seized power in 189 and dominated the Han central government. Wang Kuang led his troops to attack Dong Zhuo from the north but lost to the enemy at the Battle of Heyang Ford. When Dong Zhuo sent Humu Ban (胡母班), who married a younger sister of Wang Kuang, and other officials to negotiate a truce, Wang Kuang had them executed. In 191, Humu Ban's relatives turned against Wang Kuang and had him killed in revenge. After his death, Dong Zhuo appointed Zhang Yang as the new Administrator (太守) of Henei Commandery.

== In Romance of the Three Kingdoms ==
In the 14th-century historical novel Romance of the Three Kingdoms, Wang Kuang participates in the campaign against Dong Zhuo like his historical counterpart. At the fictional Battle of Hulao Pass, he sends his general Fang Yue (a fictional character) to fight Lü Bu, who defeats and slays Fang Yue after only five rounds.

== See also ==
- Lists of people of the Three Kingdoms
