= Kong Zhou =

Han dynasty politician (died c. 190)

- 孔伷

Inspector of Yu Province (豫州刺史)
- In office ?–?
- Monarch: Emperor Xian of Han
- Succeeded by: Sun Jian

Personal details
- Born: Unknown Kaifeng, Henan
- Died: c. 190 Henan
- Occupation: Official, warlord
- Courtesy name: Gongxu (公緒)

Kong Zhou (died c. 190), courtesy name Gongxu, was an official and minor warlord who lived during the Eastern Han dynasty of China.

== Life ==
Little is recorded about Kong Zhou in history. He was from Chenliu Commandery (陳留郡), which is around present-day Kaifeng, Henan. The official Zheng Tai (鄭泰) once mentioned that Kong Zhou excelled in qingtan (the philosophical school popular among the literati at the time) but lacked military leadership. In the 160s, Fu Rong (符融) recommended Kong Zhou as a talent to Feng Dai (馮岱), the Administrator of Chenliu Commandery, who then appointed Kong Zhou as a Reporting Officer.

Around 189, Dong Zhuo, the warlord who controlled the Han central government, appointed Kong Zhou as the Inspector (刺史) of Yu Province. In 190, Kong Zhou turned against Dong Zhuo and joined a coalition of warlords from the east of Hangu Pass in a military campaign to eliminate Dong Zhuo and free the central government from his control. However, he died not long later within the same year. After his death, another warlord Yuan Shu nominated Sun Jian to be the new Inspector of Yu Province.

== See also ==
- Lists of people of the Three Kingdoms
