= Liu Dai =

Chinese politician and warlord (died 192)

- 劉岱

Inspector of Yan Province (兗州刺史)
- In office ? – 192
- Monarch: Emperor Xian of Han

Personal details
- Born: Unknown (Note: Liu Dai was older than his brother Liu Yao, who was born in c.157.) Muping District, Yantai, Shandong
- Died: 192
- Relations: Liu Chong (courtesy name Zurong (祖荣); uncle); Liu Yao (younger brother); Liu Ji (nephew)
- Parent: Liu Yu (劉舆) /Liu Fang (劉方) (father)
- Occupation: Politician
- Courtesy name: Gongshan (公山)

Liu Dai (Note: not to be confused with Cao Cao's general who had the same name and courtesy name, but was from Pei (沛国). His only mention in historical sources was in 199, where he and Wang Zhong (王忠) were sent by Cao Cao to attack Liu Bei, who had by then occupied Xuzhou; the pair were unsuccessful. Weiwu Gushi recorded that he was made a marquis.) (died 192), courtesy name Gongshan, was a Chinese politician who lived during the late Eastern Han dynasty of China.

== Life ==
Liu Dai was from Mouping County (牟平縣), Donglai Commandery (東萊郡), which is in present-day Muping District, Yantai, Shandong. He served as Palace Attendant and the Inspector of Yan Province (兗州刺史) under the Han dynasty. Liu Dai's uncle, Liu Chong (劉寵), (Note: not the same person as Prince Min of Chen. Liu Zurong has a biography in vol.76 of Houhanshu.) served as the Grand Commandant (太尉) in the Han imperial court in 169.

In the spring of 190, Liu Dai joined the coalition of warlords led by Yuan Shao to oppose Dong Zhuo, a tyrannical warlord who controlled the central government and held Emperor Xian hostage. Later Liu Dai had disagreements with Qiao Mao, the Administrator of Dong Commandery, so he killed Qiao Mao and replaced him with Wang Gong (王肱).

Liu Dai then arranged for marriages between his family and the clans of Yuan Shao and Gongsun Zan. Yuan Shao allowed his family members to stay with Liu Dai, while Gongsun Zan sent his follower Fan Fang (范方) to lead troops to support Liu Dai. When Yuan Shao later developed a rivalry with Gongsun Zan, the latter broke off relations with Liu Dai as well. Gongsun Zan said to Fan Fang, "If Liu Dai does not drive away Yuan Shao's family members, you will lead your men back to our territory. I'll attack Liu Dai after I've eliminated Yuan Shao." Liu Dai was at a loss over how to handle the crisis when his adviser Wang Yu (王彧) told him to consult Cheng Yu, and Liu Dai heeded his suggestion. Cheng Yu urged Liu Dai to stand on Yuan Shao's side and Liu followed the advice. Gongsun Zan was defeated and conquered by Yuan Shao eventually.

In 192, thousands of former Yellow Turban rebels from Qing Province swarmed into Yan Province and gathered in Dongping County. Liu Dai wanted to attack the rebels but Bao Xin advised him against it. Liu Dai ignored Bao Xin and proceeded to attack the Yellow Turbans, and was defeated and killed in battle.

== In Romance of the Three Kingdoms ==
In the 14th-century historical novel Romance of the Three Kingdoms, when Yan Province was conquered by the warlord Cao Cao, Liu Dai had no choice but to surrender. After losing his domain, he attacked Liu Bei, but was defeated and robbed of his position. Liu Dai followed his adviser Bao Xin's suggestion to join Cao Cao and had since been engaged in suppressing the Yellow Turban remnants. As his achievements increased, Liu Dai became more overconfident and he refused to listen to Bao Xin, which resulted in their deaths.

== See also ==
- Lists of people of the Three Kingdoms
