= Yuan Yi (Han dynasty) =

Han dynasty official and warlord (died 192)

- 袁遺

Inspector of Yang Province (揚州刺史)
- In office 192
- Monarch: Emperor Xian of Han

Administrator of Shanyang (山陽太守)
- In office ? – 192
- Monarch: Emperor Xian of Han

Prefect of Chang'an (長安令)
- In office ?–?
- Monarch: Emperor Ling of Han

Personal details
- Born: Unknown; Shangshui County, Henan
- Died: 192; Pei County, Jiangsu
- Relatives: Yuan Shao (cousin); Yuan Shu (cousin); Yuan Yin (cousin)
- Occupation: Official, warlord
- Courtesy name: Boye (伯業)

Yuan Yi (died 192), courtesy name Boye, was an official and minor warlord who lived during the late Eastern Han dynasty of China.

== Life ==
Yuan Yi was from Ruyang County (汝陽縣), Runan Commandery (汝南郡), which is in present-day Shangshui County, Henan. He was a second cousin of Yuan Shao, Yuan Shu and Yuan Yin (袁胤). In the early part of his official career, he held positions such as Prefect (令) of Chang'an and Administrator (太守) of Shanyang (山陽郡; around present-day Jinxiang County, Shandong).

Yuan Yi received high praise from his contemporaries such as the scholar Zhang Chao (張超) from Hejian Commandery (河間郡) and the warlord Cao Cao. Zhang Chao, in recommending Yuan Yi as a talent to Zhu Jun, said that Yuan Yi was very well read and knowledgeable, while Cao Cao said that Yuan Yi maintained his diligence towards studying even after he had grown up.

In 190, Yuan Yi, then the Administrator of Shanyang Commandery, led the troops from his commandery to join a coalition of warlords in a military campaign against the tyrannical warlord Dong Zhuo, who had been controlling the Han central government and the figurehead Emperor Xian since 189. The coalition was led by Yuan Yi's cousin Yuan Shao; another of Yuan Yi's cousins, Yuan Shu, was also a member of the coalition. The coalition broke up by 191 as its members pursued different interests, such as territorial gains.

In 192, following the death of Chen Wen (陳溫), the Inspector (刺史) of Yang Province, Yuan Shao nominated Yuan Yi as the new Inspector to replace Chen Wen. At the time, Yuan Shao was in a proxy war with his half-brother Yuan Shu, who had occupied much of Yang Province. Yuan Yi was killed in Pei County while en route to Yang Province to assume office.

== See also ==
- Lists of people of the Three Kingdoms
