= Dong Commandery =

Historic commandery of China

Dong Commandery (Chinese: 東郡) was a commandery in historical China from the Warring States period to Sui dynasty. Its territories were situated in present-day Henan, Hebei and Shandong provinces.

The commandery was established by the state of Qin in 242 BCE after a successful campaign against the state of Wei. In early Western Han dynasty, the commandery became a part of the Liang Kingdom, which was subsequently abolished during the Lü Clan Disturbance. In late Western Han dynasty, the commandery administered 22 counties and marquessates: Puyang (濮陽), Panguan (畔觀), Liaocheng (聊城), Dunqiu (頓丘), Fagan (發干), Fan (范), Chaping (茬平), Dongwuyang (東武陽), Boping (博平), Li (黎), Qing (清), Dong'e (東阿), Lihu (離狐), Linyi (臨邑), Limiao (利苗), Xuchang (須昌), Shouliang (壽良), Lechang (樂昌), Yangping (陽平), Baima (白馬), Nanyan (南燕) and Linqiu (廩丘). The population in 2 CE was 1,659,028 individuals or 401,297 households.

The commandery went through a series of administrative changes in the Eastern Han dynasty, and by 140 CE, 15 counties remained in the commandery: Puyang, Yan (formerly Nanyan), Baima, Dunqiu, Dong'e, Dongwuyang, Fan, Linyi, Boping, Liaocheng, Fagan, Leping (樂平, formerly Qing), Yangping, Wei (衞, the fief of the descendants of the Zhou dynasty kings) and Gucheng (穀城). The population in 140 was 603,393 individuals, or 136,088 households.

From late Eastern Han to early Cao Wei dynasty, most counties of Dong was transferred to surrounding commanderies, while Linqiu and Juancheng (鄄城) counties from Jiyin were added. After the foundation of Jin dynasty, the commandery was converted to Puyang Principality (濮陽國) and successively served as the fief of several imperial princes. The region was lost during the wars of the Yongjia period.

The commandery was later restored. Under Northern Wei, Dong Commandery administered seven counties in the mid-6th century: Dongyan (東燕), Pingchang (平昌), Baima, Liangcheng (涼城), Suanzao (酸棗, formerly part of Chenliu Commandery), Changyuan (長垣, formerly part of Chenliu) and Changle (長樂). The population was 107,717 individuals or 30,521 households.

The commandery was abolished in 583. In 607, however, Yan Prefecture was renamed Dong Commandery. There was a total of nine counties: Baima, Linchang (靈昌), Weinan (衛南), Puyang, Fengqiu (封丘), Kuangcheng (匡城, renamed from Changyuan), Zuocheng (胙城, renamed from Dongyan), Weicheng (韋城) and Lihu. The population was 121,905 households.
