= Yanzhou (ancient China) =

One of the Nine Provinces of ancient China

- Chinese: 兗州 ／ 兖州
Transcriptions
Standard Mandarin
- Hanyu Pinyin: Yǎnzhōu

alternative spelling
- Chinese: 沇州
Transcriptions
Standard Mandarin
- Hanyu Pinyin: Yǎnzhōu

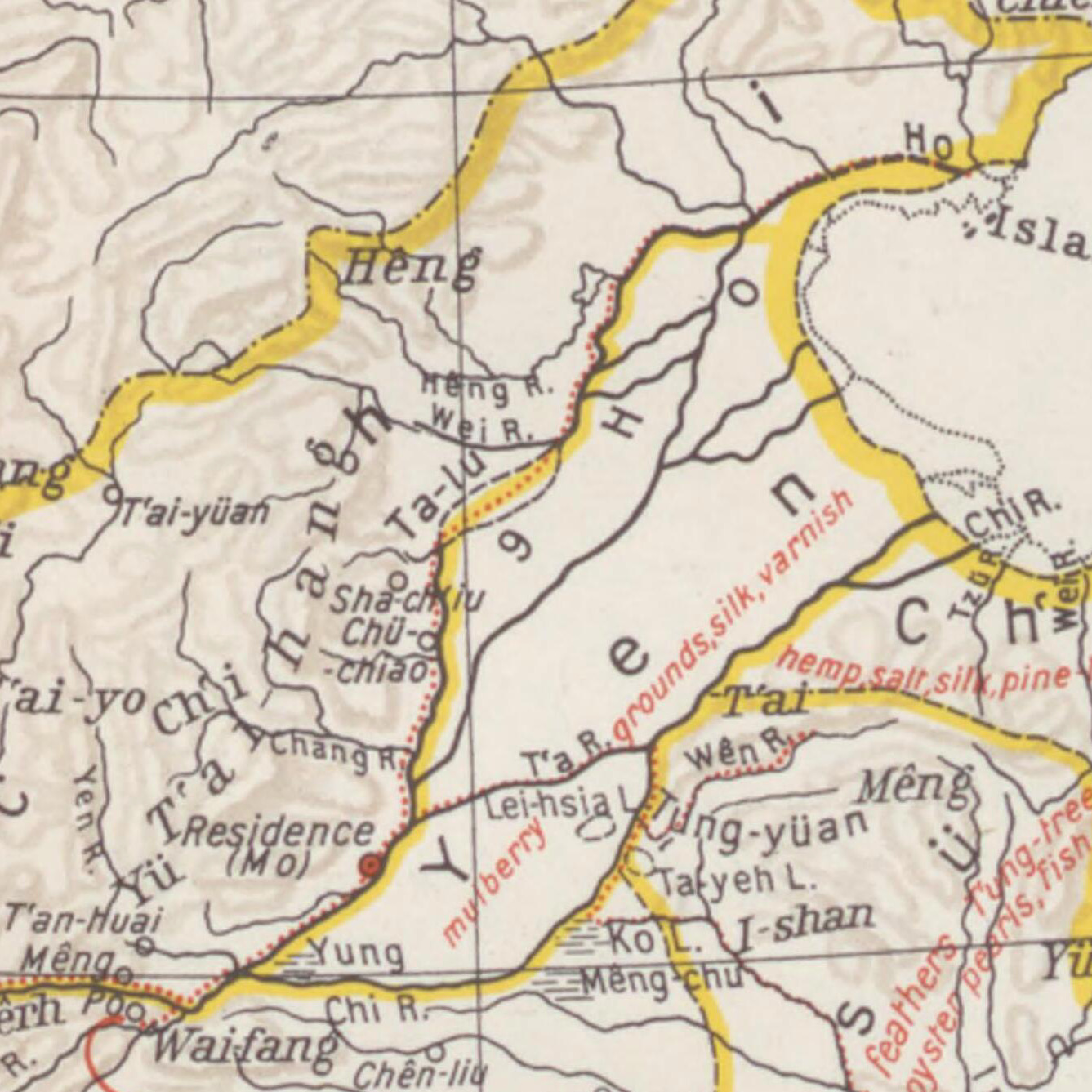
Yanzhou (labelled as "Yen") c. 1110 BCE according to Albert Herrmann's interpretation of Yu Gong.

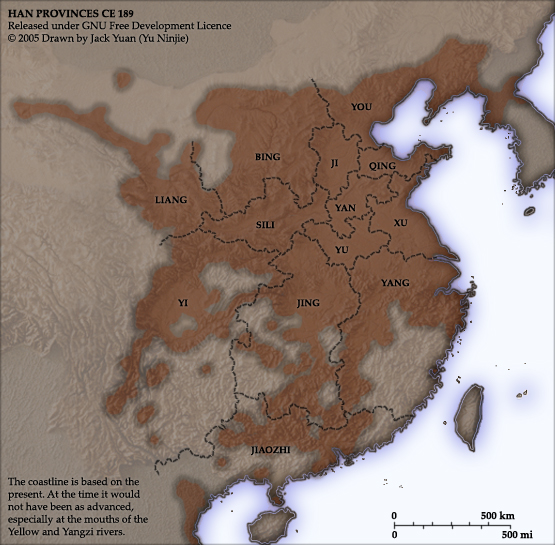
Chinese provinces in the late Eastern Han dynasty period, 189 CE.

Yan Province or Yanzhou was one of the Nine Provinces of ancient China, a list of regions compiled by Yu the Great when he toured the land after stopping the Great Flood and succeeding Emperor Yao.

== Description ==
In the Shang Shu, translated by Martin Palmer, Yu's report on Yanzhou is as follows:

Yanzhou Area: between the Ji and Yellow River. Nine rivers returned to their proper way. Leixia is an area of lake once again and functioning properly. Yong and Ju rivers flows into it. Mulberry bushes grow here now – people have settled here from the hills to cultivate the fields. Soil: rich and dark. Grass – good; woodlands healthy. Tax: middling. Fields: upper middling. Note – over the past thirteen years productivity has risen. Tribute: dyes, silks – in special coloured containers. Route: via the Ji and Ta rivers into the Yellow River.

— Confucius, translated by Martin Palmer, Shang Shu

== History ==
During the Han dynasty (206 BCE – 220 CE), Yanzhou covered roughly present-day southwestern Shandong, eastern Henan, and the northwestern corner of Jiangsu. The name is reflected in the modern city of Yanzhou, Jining, Shandong.

In 1265, during the Song dynasty, Yanzhou was upgraded to Jiande Fu, overseeing six counties: Jiande County, Chun'an County, Sui’an County, Shouchang County, Fenshui County and Tonglu County.

During the Qing dynasty, Yanzhou influence started to decline.

In 1912, Yanzhou was revoked and in 1914 it was integrated into the Dao (道) prefecture.

== Government ==
The Yanzhou government seat was located at the northern end of the central axis, halfway up the mountains, to avoid floods caused by the nearby rivers and to create "a sense of oppression" in the inner city.

In 1578, the government inner walls were dismantled, with its citizens gaining access to their headquarters. The government also moved to the northern end of the city.
