= Yuan Shu =

Chinese general and warlord of the late Han Dynasty (died 199)

Yuan Shu 袁術
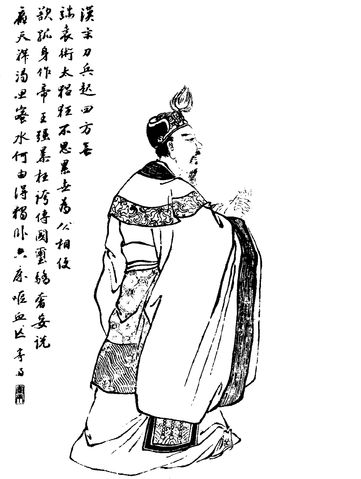
- A Qing dynasty illustration of Yuan Shu

Emperor of Zhong (仲家皇帝)
- Reign: 197–199

General of the Left (左將軍)
- In office 192 – 197
- Monarch: Emperor Xian of Han

Governor of Yang Province (揚州牧) (self-appointed)
- In office 192 – 197
- Monarch: Emperor Xian of Han

Administrator of Nanyang (南陽太守)
- In office 189 – 192
- Monarch: Emperor Xian of Han

General of the Rear (後將軍)
- In office 189 – 190
- Monarch: Emperor Xian of Han

Personal details
- Born: 155 Shangshui County, Henan
- Died: 199 Anhui
- Spouse: Lady Feng
- Parent: Yuan Feng (father)
- Relatives: Yuan Tang (grandfather); Yuan Ji (half-brother); Yuan Shao (half-brother); Yuan Yi (cousin); Yuan Yin (cousin); Yuan Wei (uncle); Yang Biao (brother-in-law); Yang Xiu (nephew); He Kui (cousin); Sun Fen's wife (granddaughter)
- Occupation: Military general, politician, warlord
- Courtesy name: Gonglu (公路)

Yuan Shu
- Traditional Chinese: 袁術
- Simplified Chinese: 袁术
Transcriptions
Standard Mandarin
- Hanyu Pinyin: Yuán Shù
- IPA: [ɥɛ̌n ʂû]

Yuan Shu (155 – 199), courtesy name Gonglu, was a Chinese military general, politician, and warlord who lived during the late Eastern Han dynasty. He rose to prominence following the collapse of the Han central government in 189. He declared himself Emperor of China in 197 under the short-lived Zhong dynasty, two years before his death in 199.

== Life ==
=== Early life ===
Yuan Shu was from Ruyang County (汝陽縣), Runan Commandery, which is in present-day Shangshui County, Henan. His family had for over four generations been a prominent force in the Han civil service, having produced numerous members in high positions since the first century CE. Descended from Yuan An, who served during the reign of Emperor Zhang, Yuan Shu was a son of the Minister of Works Yuan Feng (袁逢) and his principal wife. Yuan Shu is sometimes described to be a younger cousin of the warlord Yuan Shao, but was actually Yuan Shao's younger half-brother. (Note: See Yuan Shao#Family background for the details on the relationship between Yuan Shu and Yuan Shao.)

As a young man he gained a reputation for gallantry and liked to go hunting with dogs and falcons. Nominated as Filial and Incorrupt, he later became Intendant of Henan (河南尹) and then General of the Household Rapid as a Tiger (虎賁中郎將).

=== Campaign against Dong Zhuo (189–191) ===
After the death of General-in-Chief He Jin (22 September 189), Yuan Shu, as the Commander of the Imperial Tiger Guards, led his men to kill the eunuch faction. When Dong Zhuo seized control of the Han central government, he wanted to appoint Yuan Shu as General of the Rear, but, fearing Dong Zhuo, Yuan Shu fled to Nanyang Commandery, which he took control over after Sun Jian killed its grand administrator, Zhang Zi.

Yuan Shu participated in the Campaign against Dong Zhuo led by Yuan Shao. He was joined by Sun Jian, whom he appointed to Inspector of Yu Province. Sun Jian succeeded in defeating and killing Dong's general Hua Xiong (191), but Yuan Shu grew wary that Sun would become too successful and no longer submit to his command, and temporarily secretly cut off Sun's food supplies, thereby hindering his advance. By the time Sun Jian reached Luoyang, it had been largely destroyed by fires set by Dong Zhuo, whose forces fled westwards to Chang'an, abducting the emperor. However, his soldiers found the Imperial Seal, which Sun Jian was compelled to give to Yuan Shu.

=== Rule in Nanyang and Chenliu (190–193) ===
Yuan Shu's rule in Nanyang was despotic. After the dissension of the alliance against Dong Zhuo in 191, he vied with Yuan Shao over control of northern China, each establishing opposing alliances. Yuan Shu allied with Yuan Shao's northern rival Gongsun Zan, and Yuan Shao in turn allied with Yuan Shu's southern rival Liu Biao. Yuan Shu sent Sun Jian to attack Liu Biao, but his proxy was killed in the Battle of Xiangyang (191). Sun Jian's nephew Sun Ben took over Sun Jian's command and formally joined Yuan Shu, who granted him the title of Inspector of Yu Province. After this defeat and his unpopularity due to his extravagant regime in Nanyang, Yuan Shu moved his residence to Chenliu, and extended his influence into Yang Province in 192.

=== Warlord in Shouchun (193–197) ===
In early 193, Yuan Shu suffered repeated defeats, such as the Battle of Fengqiu, by the combined armies of Cao Cao and Yuan Shao. He fled to Shouchun in Jiujiang (present day Shou County, Anhui) on the southern bank of the Huai River. From his new headquarters, he built up a powerful warlord state. He deposed Inspector Chen Wen of Yang Province and took the title for himself, also claiming to be Lord of Xu Province.

From 194 to early 197, Sun Jian's son Sun Ce and brother-in-law Wu Jing conquered many territories in Jiangdong on Yuan Shu's behalf. He was less successful in expanding his rule in Xu Province, where he fought against Liu Bei and Lü Bu; the latter briefly allied himself to Yuan Shu in 196, but betrayed him again and drove him back to Shouchun.

=== Emperor of Zhongshi Dynasty (197–199) ===
Yuan Shu declared himself emperor under the short-lived Zhongshi (仲氏) dynasty in early 197, citing superstition as his justification, including the Chinese characters for his given name Shu and courtesy name Gonglu, and his possession of the Imperial Seal, which was given to him by the late Sun Jian. This audacious action made him a target of the other warlords. His extravagant lifestyle and arrogance caused many of his followers to desert him. Most devastating of the departures and defections – both to Yuan Shu personally and to the strength of his forces – was that by Sun Ce, who had conquered most of the Jiangdong territories under Yuan Shu's banner. Following crushing defeats by the armies of Cao Cao, Liu Bei, and Lü Bu, Yuan Shu attempted to flee north to join Yuan Shao. Yuan Shao sent his eldest son, Yuan Tan, to try to aid Yuan Shu; however, an alliance between the Yuan brothers who had long hated each other would not arise, as Yuan Tan arrived too late, and Yuan Shu's forces were blocked and forced to retreat to Shouchun by Liu Bei. He died shortly thereafter of starvation, being unable to swallow the coarse food that his soldiers ate. His final request was for a glass of honey water, but his soldiers had none.

== Family ==
- Grandfather: Yuan Tang (袁湯)
- Father: Yuan Feng (袁逢)
- Siblings:
  - Yuan Shao, elder half-brother
- Cousins:
  - Yuan Yi, elder cousin
  - Yuan Yin (袁胤), younger cousin
- Spouse: Lady Feng (馮氏), daughter of Feng Fang (馮方)
- Children:
  - Yuan Yao (袁耀), son. After Yuan Shu's death, Yuan Yao and his family fled to Lujiang Commandery to join the minor warlord Liu Xun. After Sun Ce defeated Liu Xun and conquered Lujiang Commandery, Yuan Yao was captured and eventually worked as a Palace Gentleman (郎中) in the state of Sun Quan's (Sun Ce's younger brother) state of Eastern Wu. Yuan Yao's daughter married Sun Fen (孫奮), the fifth son of Sun Quan.
  - Lady Yuan (袁夫人), daughter, personal name unknown, became one of Sun Quan's concubines after she and her brother were captured. She was known for good character but did not give birth. Sun Quan let her raise children whose mothers were his other concubines. However, all the children that she raised died at early ages. When Lady Bu died in 238, Sun Quan wanted to instate Lady Yuan as the empress. Lady Yuan refused with the reason of having no child.
  - Lady Yuan (袁夫人), daughter, personal name unknown, married Huang Yi (黃猗)
- Relatives:
  - Yuan Wei (袁隗), uncle
  - Yang Biao (楊彪), brother-in-law, father of Yang Xiu
  - He Kui (何夔), distant cousin
  - Yuan She, clansman

== See also ==
- Lists of people of the Three Kingdoms
- Campaign against Yuan Shu
