= Henei Commandery =

Ancient Chinese political subdivision

Henei Commandery (Chinese: 河內郡) was a commandery of China from Han dynasty to Tang dynasty, located in modern Henan province, to the north of Yellow River.

In ancient China, Henei ("Inside the Yellow River") referred to the land north of the lower Yellow River. The commandery was established during Emperor Gaozu of Han's reign. It administered 18 counties: Huai (懷), Ji (汲), Wude (武德), Bo (波), Shanyang (山陽), Heyang (河陽), Zhou (州), Gong (共), Pinggao (平皋), Zhaoge (朝歌), Xiuwu (脩武), Wen (溫), Yewang (野王), Huojia (獲嘉), Zhi (軹), Qinshui (沁水), Longlü (隆慮) and Dangyin (蕩陰). The 2 AD census recorded 1,067,097 people in 241,246 households, while the census in 140 AD recorded 159,770 households and 801,558 people.

Over the course of Jin and Northern Wei dynasties, the Han-era Henei Commandery was divided into four commanderies including Henei, Linlü (林慮), Ji and Wude. According to the Book of Wei, the population was 42,601, 55,714, 102,997, and 52,372 respectively.

In early Kaihuang era, the much reduced Henei Commandery was merged into Huai Prefecture (懷州). Later, Henei Commandery became an alternative name of Huai. In 742 AD, the prefecture had 5 counties, and a population of 318,126.
