= Hangu Pass =

Mountain pass in China

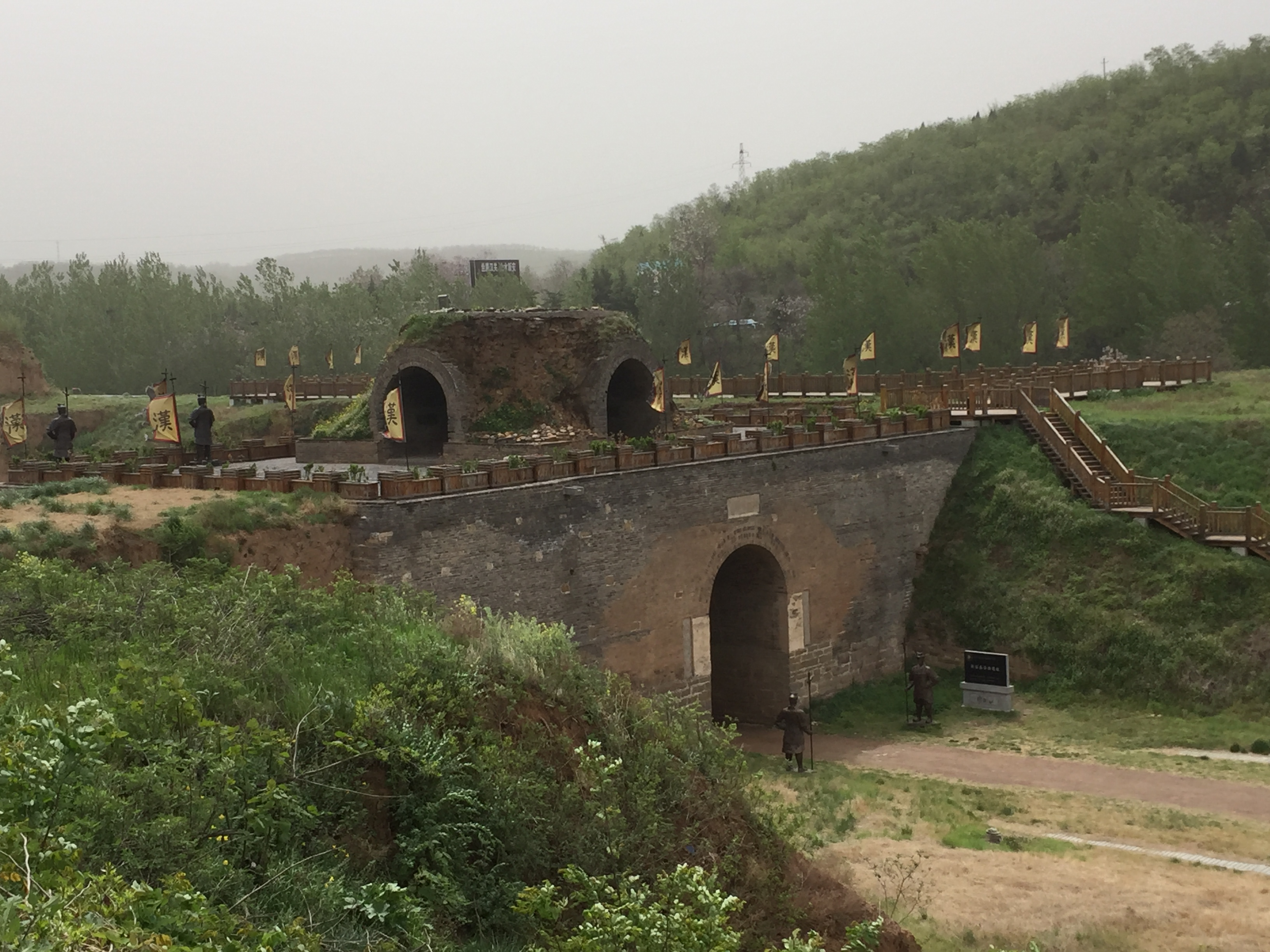
- Hangu Pass archaeological site museum at Xin'an, Luoyang

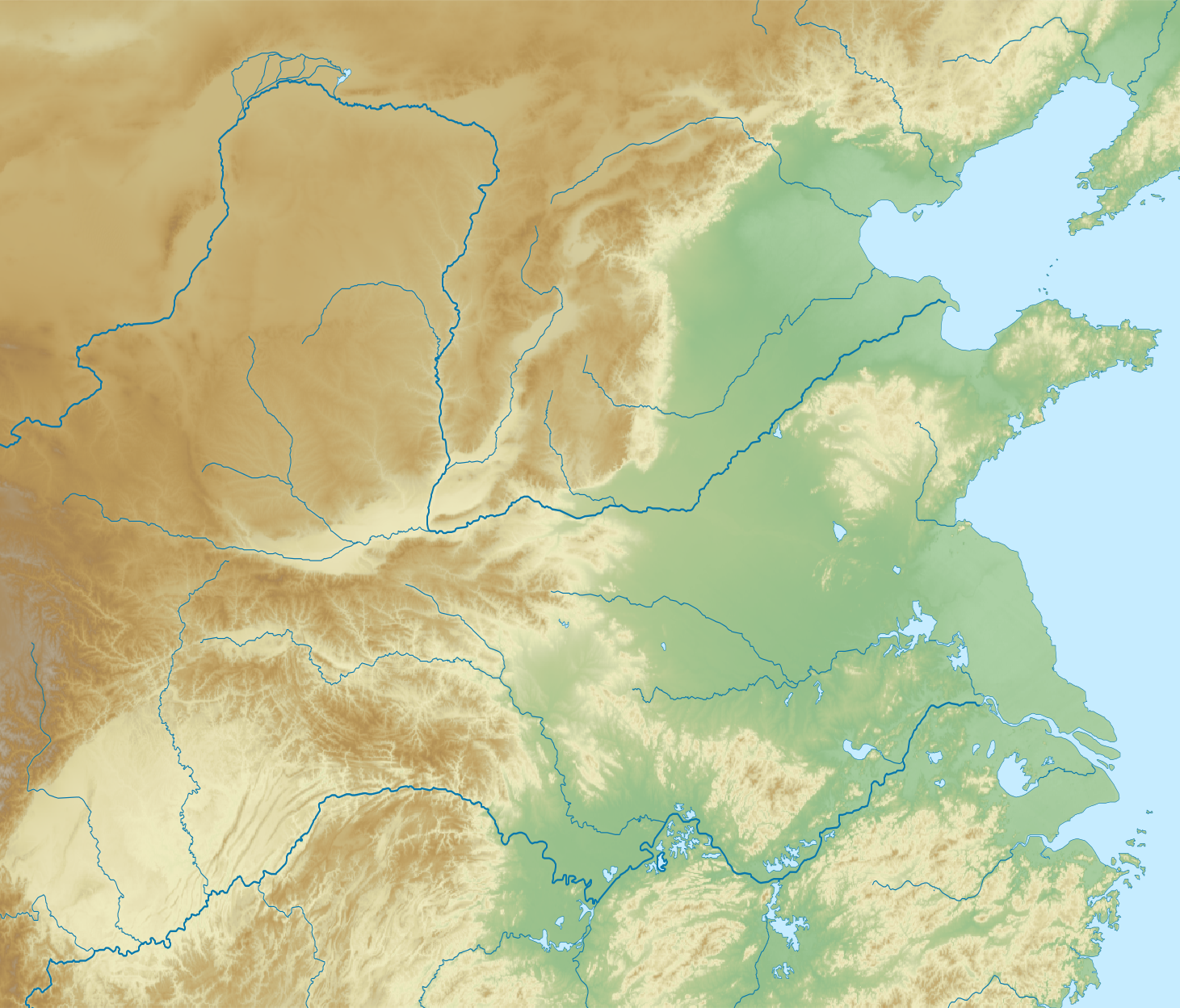
- Location within Northern China Location within China
- Traversed by: G310

Third Approach
- Location: Sanmenxia, Henan, China
- Range: Qinling
- Coordinates: 34°38′N 110°55′E

Hangu Pass
- Traditional Chinese: 函谷關
- Simplified Chinese: 函谷关
Transcriptions
Standard Mandarin
- Hanyu Pinyin: Hángǔguān
- Wade–Giles: Han-ku-kuan

Hangu Pass or Hanguguan was a fortified gateway that commanded the strategic mountain pass between the Yellow River and Qinling Mountains, forming the main choke point on the only land corridor between the Central Plain and the Guanzhong region. The pass restricted access into the lower Wei River valleys, where the heartland of the state of Qin and the unified Qin dynasty were located, as well as the subsequent dynasties of Han, Sui and Tang.

The Hangu Pass lies on the south (right) bank of the Yellow River, 60 km (37 mi) downstream of its eastward bend out of the Ordos Loop. It was built by the state of Qin in 330 BC and had been the site of many sieges and field battles during the Warring States period and early imperial eras. Due to terrain changes from bank erosions and alluvial deposition of the Yellow River over the centuries, the Hangu Pass eventually fell to ruins after losing its defensive values to the newer Tong Pass to its west, which was built near the mouth of the Wei River in 196 AD by the warlord Cao Cao.

The term "Hangu Pass" can mean to two locations: the Qin-era Hangu Pass in Hanguguan Town, Lingbao County, Sanmenxia, Henan province; and secondly, the Han-era Hangu Pass in Xin'an County, Luoyang, Henan. Traditionally, the term refers to the former. In 2014, the archeological site was recognized by UNESCO as part of the “Silk Roads: the Routes Network of Chang'an-Tianshan Corridor” World Heritage Site.

== History ==
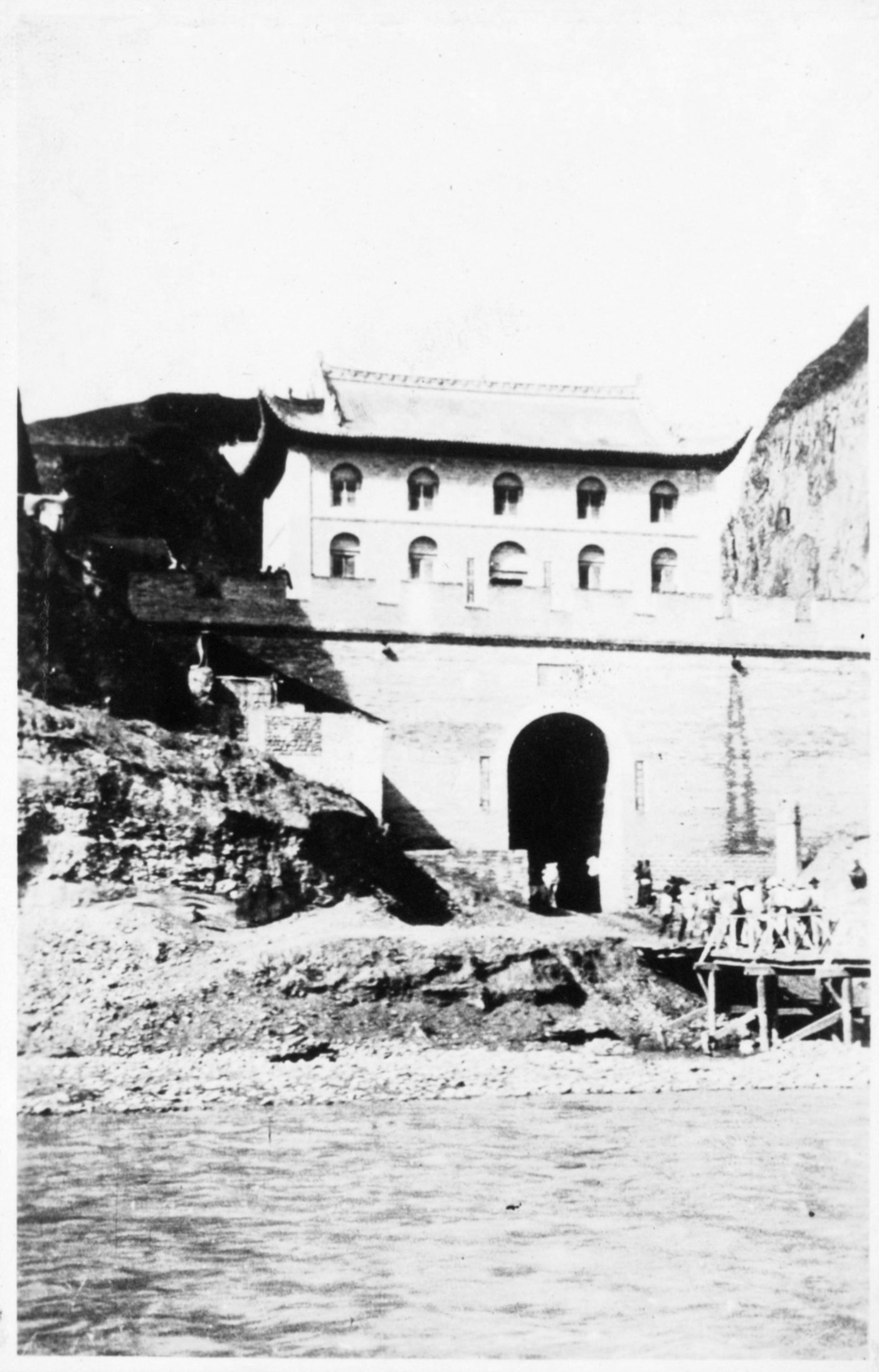
Hangu Pass in 1932

Chinese legend states that Lao-tzu wrote his Tao Te Ching at the insistence of Yinxi, an astrologer and the guard at Hangu Pass, before leaving for the west.

The state of Qin fortified the pass in 361 BC as its eastern border, protecting access to their homeland from the armies of the other Warring States competing to succeed the Zhou. It continued to protect the Guanzhong area of the Qin and Western Han empires. Under the Eastern Han that succeeded Wang Mang's "Xin dynasty", its fortifications protected the capital Luoyang in the other direction, staving off attacks coming from the west and northwest.

After the fall of the Han and rise of the Three Kingdoms, the Hangu Pass lost most of its importance as the primary fortifications moved a little west to Tong Pass.

== Discovery of Han dynasty Hangu Pass site ==
Between 2012 and 2013 a team from the Luoyang Cultural Relics and Archaeological Institution conducted an archaeological excavation at the site in Xin'an, Luoyang, on an area of more than 3,000 square meters. This excavation brought several roads, platforms and walls to light. Today, the archaeological site of the Hangu Pass in Xin’an is a museum park.

== Hangu Pass in fiction ==
In the manga series Kingdom by Yasuhisa Hara, the Hangu Pass was the last chokepoint that Li Mu and his Coalition Army needed to overcome in order to defeat Qin. Their attacks were repelled with great losses, forcing Li Mu to make a decision of attacking Xianyang via Zui.

== See also ==
- Sanmenxia
- Tong Pass
- Wu Pass
