= AD 189 =

189 in various calendars
- Gregorian calendar: 189; CLXXXIX
- Ab urbe condita: 942
- Assyrian calendar: 4939
- Balinese saka calendar: 110–111
- Bengali calendar: −405 – −404
- Berber calendar: 1139
- Buddhist calendar: 733
- Burmese calendar: −449
- Byzantine calendar: 5697–5698
- Chinese calendar: 戊辰年 (Earth Dragon); 2886 or 2679 — to — 己巳年 (Earth Snake); 2887 or 2680
- Coptic calendar: −95 – −94
- Discordian calendar: 1355
- Ethiopian calendar: 181–182
- Hebrew calendar: 3949–3950
- Hindu calendars
- Vikram Samvat: 245–246
- Shaka Samvat: 110–111
- Kali Yuga: 3289–3290
- Holocene calendar: 10189
- Iranian calendar: 433 BP – 432 BP
- Islamic calendar: 446 BH – 445 BH
- Javanese calendar: 66–67
- Julian calendar: 189; CLXXXIX
- Korean calendar: 2522
- Minguo calendar: 1723 before ROC 民前1723年
- Nanakshahi calendar: −1279
- Seleucid era: 500/501 AG
- Thai solar calendar: 731–732
- Tibetan calendar: ས་ཕོ་འབྲུག་ལོ་ (male Earth-Dragon); 315 or −66 or −838 — to — ས་མོ་སྦྲུལ་ལོ་ (female Earth-Snake); 316 or −65 or −837

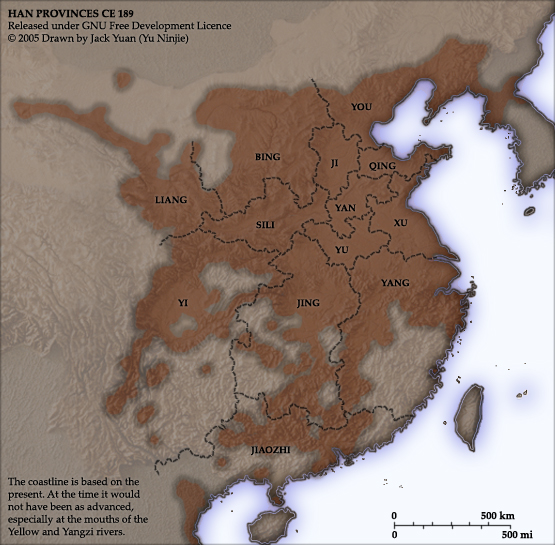
Map of the Chinese provinces in the prelude of the Three kingdom period (In the late Han dynasty period, 189 CE).

Year 189 (CLXXXIX) was a common year starting on Wednesday of the Julian calendar. At the time, it was known as the Year of the Consulship of Silanus and Silanus (or, less frequently, year 942 Ab urbe condita). The denomination 189 for this year has been used since the early medieval period, when the Anno Domini calendar era became the prevalent method in Europe for naming years.

== Events ==
=== By place ===
==== Roman Empire ====
- Plague (possibly smallpox) kills as many as 2,000 people per day in Rome. Farmers are unable to harvest their crops, and food shortages bring riots in the city.

==== China ====
- Liu Bian succeeds Emperor Ling, as Chinese emperor of the Han dynasty.
- Dong Zhuo has Liu Bian deposed, and installs Emperor Xian as emperor.
- Two thousand eunuchs in the palace are slaughtered in a violent purge in Luoyang, the capital of Han.

=== By topic ===
==== Arts and sciences ====
- Galen publishes his "Treatise on the various temperaments" (a.k.a. On the Elements According to Hippocrates).

==== Religion ====
- Pope Victor I succeeds Pope Eleuterus as the fourteenth pope, the first from Africa.
- Demetrius of Alexandria becomes Patriarch of Alexandria.
- Pantaenus, who was sent by the bishop of Alexandria to India to preach Christianity, meets with little success.

== Births ==
- March 7 – Publius Septimius Geta, Roman emperor (d. 211)
- Ling Tong, Chinese general of the Eastern Wu state (d. 217)
- Zhang Chunhua, Chinese noblewoman and aristocrat (d. 247)

== Deaths ==
- May 13 – Ling of Han (or Liu Hong), Chinese emperor (b. 156)
- May 24 – Eleutherius, bishop of Rome (or Catholic Church)
- September 22 – He Jin, Chinese Grand Marshal and regent
- Ding Yuan (or Jian Yang), Chinese official and warlord
- Jian Shuo, Chinese eunuch leader (Ten Attendants)
- Lingsi (or He), Chinese empress of the Han dynasty
- Xiaoren, Chinese empress dowager of the Han dynasty
