= Secret of the Three Kingdoms =

2018 Chinese historical series

Chinese name
- Traditional Chinese: 三國機密之潛龍在淵
- Simplified Chinese: 三国机密之潜龙在渊
Transcriptions
Standard Mandarin
- Hanyu Pinyin: Sān Guó Jī Mì Zhī Qiǎn Lóng Zài Yuān
- Genre: Historical fiction
- Based on: San Guo Ji Mi by Ma Boyong
- Screenplay by: Chang Jiang
- Story by: Ma Boyong
- Directed by: Patrick Yau; Cheng Wai-man
- Starring: Ma Tianyu; Elvis Han; Wan Qian; Dong Jie; Sunny Wang; Dong Xuan; Tan Jianci; Tse Kwan-ho
- Country of origin: China
- Original language: Mandarin
- No. of episodes: 54

Production
- Producers: Karen Tsai; Xu Yiming
- Production locations: Hengdian World Studios; Xiangshan Film City
- Running time: 45 minutes per episode
- Production company: Tangren Media

Original release
- Network: Tencent
- Release: March 27, 2018

Secret of the Three Kingdoms is a 2018 Chinese television series based on the novel San Guo Ji Mi (三国机密; Secret of the Three Kingdoms) by Ma Boyong. Produced by Tangren Media and directed by Patrick Yau and Cheng Wai-man, the series starred Ma Tianyu, Elvis Han, Wan Qian, Dong Jie, Sunny Wang, Dong Xuan, Tan Jianci and Tse Kwan-ho in the leading roles. The series aired on Tencent starting March 27, 2018.

== Synopsis ==
The series is set in the late Eastern Han dynasty of China. Consort Wang, a concubine of Emperor Ling, has just given birth to a pair of twin boys – Liu Xie and Liu Ping – when she is poisoned to death by the jealous Empress He. While Liu Xie is raised by his grandmother Empress Dowager Dong and later becomes the emperor (as Emperor Xian), Liu Ping is secretly taken out of the palace and raised as a commoner.

Eighteen years later, chaos has broken out throughout China as various warlords fight for power and control over territories. Emperor Xian has been reduced to the status of a puppet under the control of a powerful warlord, Cao Cao. During this time, he learns that he has a secret twin brother, Liu Ping, so he summons his brother to the palace to help him save the Eastern Han dynasty from collapse. Throughout these years, Liu Ping has grown up with Sima Yi and never knew about his true origins.

A power struggle breaks out between Liu Ping and Cao Cao. With assistance from Sima Yi, Empress Fu Shou and other Han loyalists, Liu Ping evades several attempts by Cao Cao and his followers to get rid of him. At a critical moment, Liu Ping realises that he cannot do anything to save the Eastern Han dynasty and that the best thing he can do is to back out from the power struggle.

== Cast ==
- Ma Tianyu as Yang Ping / Liu Xie, Emperor Xian of Han
- Elvis Han as Sima Yi
- Wan Qian as Empress Fu Shou
- Dong Jie as Tang Ying, Princess Consort of Hongnong
- Sunny Wang as Guo Jia
- Dong Xuan as Ren Hongchang (Diaochan)
- Tan Jianci as Cao Pi
- Tse Kwan-ho as Cao Cao
- Wang Yuwen as Cao Jie, Empress Xianmu
- Wang Xiaomin as Zhen Fu, Empress Wenzhao
- Li Jianyi as Zhang Yu
- Shu Yaoxuan as Jia Xu
- Wang Renjun as Xun Yu
- Na Renhua as Empress Dowager Dong
- Tu Nan as Man Chong
- Wang Meng as Yang Xiu
- Zhang Qi as Yang Biao
- Shi Wenxiang as Leng Shouguang
- Chang Cheng as Yang Jun
- Li Yansheng as Kong Rong
- Wang Yinuo as Consort Dong
- Sun Zujun as Wang Fu
- Wang Yilin as Zhao Yan
- Liu Yuhan as Cao Zhi
- Jia Benchu as Sima Lang
- Lin Jing as Empress He
- Deng Shang as Xu Fu

== Production ==
The series was filmed at the Hengdian World Studios and Xiangshan Film City between 7 March and 28 June 2017.

== Awards and nominations ==
Award	Category	Nominated work	Result	Ref.
Golden Bud - The Third Network Film And Television Festival	IP Adaptation of the Year		Won	

== International broadcast ==
Country	Network(s)/Station(s)	Series premiere	Title
China	Tencent Video	March 27, 2018 (Update 2 episodes every Tuesday to Thursday at 20:00, VIP members see the next week in advance)	三国机密之潜龙在渊 ( ; lit: )
Vietnam	HTV7	May 22, 2018 (Monday to Saturday 13:00)	Tam quốc cơ mật (lit: 三国机密)
South Korea	China Channel	August 23, 2018 (Monday to Friday 22:00)	( ; lit: )
Hong Kong	TVB Jade	September 3, 2018 (Monday to Friday 19:00-19:30)	三国机密之潜龙在渊 ( ; lit: )
Singapore	Hub VV Drama	December 27, 2018 (Monday to Friday 21:00-22:00)	Secret of the Three Kingdoms ( ; lit: )
Malaysia	8TV (Malaysia)	February 26, 2019 (Monday to Friday 20:30-21:30)	Secret of the Three Kingdoms ( ; lit: )
Thailand	MCOT HD	June 6, 2019 (Thursday to Friday, 21.00)	Secret of the Three Kingdoms ตำนานลับสามก๊ก ( ; lit: )

== See also ==
- List of media adaptations of Romance of the Three Kingdoms
