= Army of the Western Garden =

Chinese standing army established in 188

- Traditional Chinese: 西園軍
- Simplified Chinese: 西园军
Transcriptions
Standard Mandarin
- Hanyu Pinyin: Xī Yuán Jūn

The Army of the Western Garden was a standing army established in 188 in the Eastern Han dynasty during the reign of Emperor Ling of Han. It was disbanded in 190.

== History ==
Emperor Ling had endowed his brother-in-law, the General-in-Chief He Jin, with much military power. In September or early October 188, he established the Army of the Western Garden in the capital Luoyang and appointed eight colonels to command the Army.

The eight colonels were:

- Jian Shuo, Colonel of the Upper Army (上軍校尉)
- Yuan Shao, Colonel of the Central Army (中軍校尉)
- Bao Hong (鮑鴻), Colonel of the Lower Army (下軍校尉)
- Cao Cao, Colonel Who Arranges the Army (典軍校尉)
- Zhao Rong (趙融), Left Colonel Who Assists the Army (助軍左校尉)
- Feng Fang (馮芳), Right Colonel Who Assists the Army (助軍右校尉)
- Chunyu Qiong, Colonel of the Left Army (左軍校尉)
- Xia Mou (夏牟), Colonel of the Right Army (右軍校尉)

The other seven Colonels were under the command of Jian Shuo and the Army of the Western Garden comprised the main armed forces in Luoyang. As the Army took direct orders from Emperor Ling, its authority exceeded that of He Jin. In 189, Emperor Ling died and was succeeded by the young Emperor Shao. He Jin secretly plotted with Yuan Shao and others to eliminate Jian Shuo and the eunuch faction in the imperial court. He also contemplated summoning the northwestern warlord Dong Zhuo to lead his forces to Luoyang to assist him, but his idea was strongly opposed by Zheng Tai (鄭泰) and Lu Zhi on the grounds that it would lead to political turmoil.

By the time Dong Zhuo entered Luoyang, He Jin had been assassinated by the eunuchs, so Yuan Shao took charge of the Army of the Western Garden. In revenge, Yuan Shao and his colleagues led troops into the palace and slaughtered the eunuchs. Emperor Shao and his younger half-brother, the Prince of Chenliu, escaped from the palace during the chaos and were later found by Dong Zhuo and brought back to Luoyang. Dong Zhuo also seized the opportunity to monopolise state power and dominate the central government. Not long later, he deposed Emperor Shao and replaced him with the Prince of Chenliu, who became known as Emperor Xian. By then, Yuan Shao, Cao Cao and others had left Luoyang and they later combined forces to start a campaign against Dong Zhuo in 190. The Army of the Western Garden was disbanded after Yuan Shao and the others left.
