= Empress Linghuai =

Concubine of Emperor Ling of Han

Wang Rong 王荣
- Empress of the Han dynasty (Posthumously)
- Born: Unknown; Handan, Kingdom of Zhao (Modern day Handan, Hebei)
- Died: 181; Luoyang, Eastern Han
- Cause of death: Poisoning
- Spouse: Emperor Ling of Han
- Issue: Emperor Xian of Han
Posthumous name
- Empress Linghuai (灵怀皇后)
- Father: Wang Zhang

Empress Linghuai (simplified Chinese: 灵怀皇后; traditional Chinese: 靈懷皇后; pinyin: Línghuái Huánghòu) (d. 181) of the Wang Clan personal name Wang Rong (simplified Chinese: 王荣; traditional Chinese: 王榮; pinyin: Wáng Róng) (Note: Lady Wang's name is found in vol.27 of the Houhanji (后汉纪) by Yuan Hong), was a concubine of Emperor Ling and mother of Emperor Xian. During her life, she was a concubine with the title of Meiren (Chinese: 美人; pinyin: Měi Rén) and was posthumously promoted as empress after her son took the throne, though she was never given the title during her lifetime.

During her pregnancy, Consort Wang, fearful of Emperor Ling's empress Empress He, had taken drugs that were intended to induce an abortion, but was unsuccessful in her attempt. Soon after she gave birth to her son, the jealous Empress He killed her by putting poison in her food.

== Biography ==
Lady Wang's exact birthdate is unrecorded. She was born in Handan, in the Kingdom of Zhao (Modern Handan, Hebei). Her grandfather, Wang Bao (Chinese: 王苞; pinyin: Wáng Bāo), served as a General of the Household for All Purposes (五官中郎將) in the Han imperial court. She was born to his son Wang Zhang (Chinese: 王章; pinyin: Wáng Zhāng), while her mother's name is unrecorded. She was said to be not only beautiful in appearance, but also talented in arts and mathematics.

She entered the harem of Emperor Ling at an unknown date and was given the title of Meiren (Lady of beauty). When she became pregnant with her son, she was fearful of Empress He, Emperor Ling's main wife, who was said to be jealous and cruel, with Emperor Ling's other consorts fearing her. In fear, she attempted but failed to terminate her pregnancy by taking drugs. Soon afterwards, she gave birth to Liu Xie, the future Emperor Xian of Han, the jealous Empress He then had her killed by poisoning her food. When Emperor Ling learned of her death, he became angry and wanted to depose Empress He, but the powerful eunuchs, who he trusted, dissuaded him from doing so. Her son was then put in the care of Emperor Ling's mother Empress Dowager Dong. Saddened by her death, Emperor Ling wrote poems in her memory.

After Emperor Ling's death and the assassination of the eunuchs in 189, the warlord Dong Zhuo took control of the capital and then deposed and poisoned the then Empress dowager He and her son in 189 and 190 respectively and installed her son (then known as the Prince of Chenliu) on the throne (posthumously known as Emperor Xian).

In 194, officials petitioned Emperor Xian to posthumously honour his mother, which he did, honouring her as Empress Linghuai.
