= Guangxi (disambiguation) =

Guangxi is an autonomous region of China.

Guangxi may also refer to Chinese era names used by several emperors of China:

- Guangxi (光熹, 189), era name used by Liu Bian, emperor of the Han dynasty
- Guangxi (光熙, 306), era name used by Emperor Hui of Jin

== See also ==
- Guanxi or connections, Chinese sociological concept
