= Consort Tang =

Consort of Liu Bian (Han dynasty Emperor Shao)

Consort Tang 唐姬

Princess Consort of Hongnong (弘農王妃)
- Tenure: c. 190s – ?
- Spouse: Liu Bian, Prince Huai of Hongnong
- Father: Tang Mao

Consort Tang (fl. 189–190) was a consort of Liu Bian (Emperor Shao), the 13th and penultimate emperor of the Eastern Han dynasty of ancient China.

== Life ==
Consort Tang was from Yingchuan Commandery (潁川郡; around present-day Xuchang, Henan). Her father, Tang Mao (唐瑁), served as the Administrator (太守) of Kuaiji Commandery during the reign of Emperor Ling (r. 168–189). She became a consort of Liu Bian (Emperor Shao), Emperor Ling's elder son and successor, in an unknown year.

Following Emperor Ling's death on 13 May 189, Liu Bian became the new emperor on 15 May. However, he was deposed by the warlord Dong Zhuo on 28 September that year and replaced with his younger half-brother, Liu Xie (Emperor Xian). The deposed Emperor Shao became known as the Prince of Hongnong (弘農王) and was put under house arrest along with the rest of his family.

Some months later, in the spring of 190, a coalition of warlords started a campaign against Dong Zhuo in the name of freeing the Han central government from his control. As Dong Zhuo feared that the warlords might use Liu Bian as a figurehead to strengthen their legitimacy, on 6 March 190, he ordered his subordinate Li Ru to murder the prince.

Realising that he could not escape death, Liu Bian wrote a poem before succumbing to his fate:

天道易兮我何艱！ Heaven and Earth are changing; how much am I suffering!
棄萬乘兮退守藩。 I, once the centre of all eyes, am driven to the humble hut.
逆臣見迫兮命不延， Oppressed by a treacherous subject, my life nears its end;
逝將去汝兮適幽玄！ Now I am leaving you and going on an eternal journey!

Liu Bian then ordered Consort Tang to dance. She sang,

皇天崩兮后土穨， Heaven is to be rent asunder, Earth to fall away;
身為帝兮命夭摧。 I, as the emperor's concubine, would grieve if I followed him not.
死生路異兮從此乖， We have come to the parting of ways, the quick and the dead walk not together;
柰我煢獨兮心中哀！ Alas, I am left alone with the grief in my heart!

Liu Bian then told Consort Tang, "You were once a consort of an emperor, so I hope you won't become the wife of a minor official or a commoner. With that, maintain your dignity." He then committed suicide by consuming poison. After Liu Bian's death, Consort Tang returned to her home in Yingchuan Commandery. Her father Tang Mao wanted her to remarry but she refused.

Some years later in the early 190s, she was captured when the warlords Li Jue and Guo Si sent their troops to pillage the lands east of Hangu Pass. Li Jue wanted to make Consort Tang his concubine but she refused and never told him that she was a former concubine of an emperor. Jia Xu, an adviser to Li Jue, found out about it and informed Emperor Xian. Emperor Xian took pity on her and summoned her to Liu Bian's tomb, where he honoured her by awarding her the title "Princess Consort of Hongnong" (弘農王妃).
