= Empress Song =

Empress Song (宋皇后) may refer to:

- Empress Song (Han dynasty) (died 178), empress of the Han dynasty
- Song Fujin (died 945), empress of the Southern Tang dynasty
- Empress Song (Song dynasty) (952–995), empress of the Song dynasty

== See also ==
- Queen Song (1440–1521), Korean queen of Joseon
