= Wang Rong =

Wang Rong may refer to:

- Wang Rong (consort) (王榮; died 181), Han dynasty imperial consort posthumously named Empress Linghuai
- Wang Rong (Jin dynasty) (王戎; 234–305), Jin dynasty general
- Wang Rong (warlord) (王鎔; 877–921), warlord during the late Tang dynasty and early Five Dynasties period
- Wang Rong (politician) (王荣; born 1958), People's Republic of China politician
- Wang Rong (badminton) (王榮; born 1984), Chinese badminton player
