= 247 =

247 in various calendars
- Gregorian calendar: 247; CCXLVII
- Ab urbe condita: 1000
- Assyrian calendar: 4997
- Balinese saka calendar: 168–169
- Bengali calendar: −347 – −346
- Berber calendar: 1197
- Buddhist calendar: 791
- Burmese calendar: −391
- Byzantine calendar: 5755–5756
- Chinese calendar: 丙寅年 (Fire Tiger); 2944 or 2737 — to — 丁卯年 (Fire Rabbit); 2945 or 2738
- Coptic calendar: −37 – −36
- Discordian calendar: 1413
- Ethiopian calendar: 239–240
- Hebrew calendar: 4007–4008
- Hindu calendars
- Vikram Samvat: 303–304
- Shaka Samvat: 168–169
- Kali Yuga: 3347–3348
- Holocene calendar: 10247
- Iranian calendar: 375 BP – 374 BP
- Islamic calendar: 387 BH – 386 BH
- Javanese calendar: 125–126
- Julian calendar: 247; CCXLVII
- Korean calendar: 2580
- Minguo calendar: 1665 before ROC 民前1665年
- Nanakshahi calendar: −1221
- Seleucid era: 558/559 AG
- Thai solar calendar: 789–790
- Tibetan calendar: མེ་ཕོ་སྟག་ལོ་ (male Fire-Tiger); 373 or −8 or −780 — to — མེ་མོ་ཡོས་ལོ་ (female Fire-Hare); 374 or −7 or −779

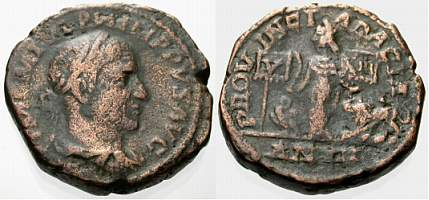
Sestertius minted in 247 by Philip the Arab to celebrate Dacia province and its legions, V Macedonica and XIII Gemina. Note the eagle and the lion, V's and XIII's symbols, in the reverse.

Year 247 (CCXLVII) was a common year starting on Friday of the Julian calendar. At the time, it was known as the Year of the Consulship of Philippus and Severus (or, less frequently, year 1000 Ab urbe condita). The denomination 247 for this year has been used since the early medieval period, when the Anno Domini calendar era became the prevalent method in Europe for naming years.

== Events ==
=== By place ===
==== Roman Empire ====
- Rome becomes 1,000 years old. The 1,000th anniversary is commemorated with the Ludi Saeculares festivals, celebrated throughout the Roman Empire.
- Marcus Julius Philippus Augustus and his 10-year-old son Marcus Julius Philippus Caesar become Roman Consuls.
- The Goths appear on the lower Danube frontier; they invade Ukraine and Romania.
- Emperor Philip the Arab marks the millennium of Rome by holding the Ludi Saeculares.
- The last of the two Councils of Arabia in the Roman Christian Church is held in Bostra, Arabia Petraea.

==== Asia ====
- Himiko of Yamataikoku, in Japan, begins a war against King Himikoku of Kunukoku.
- Cheomhae becomes king of the Korean kingdom of Silla.

== Births ==
- Pan Yue, Chinese poet and writer of the Jin Dynasty (d. 300)
- Prisca, Roman empress and wife of Diocletian (d. 315)

== Deaths ==
- Abba Arikha, Babylonian Jewish scholar and rabbi (b. 175)
- Bu Zhi (or Zishan), Chinese general, official and statesman
- Xiang Lang (or Juda), Chinese general, official and politician
- Zhang Chunhua, wife of Sima Yi, regent of the Cao Wei state (b. 189)
