= 315 =

315 in various calendars
Gregorian calendar	315; CCCXV
Ab urbe condita	1068
Assyrian calendar	5065
Balinese saka calendar	236–237
Bengali calendar	−279 – −278
Berber calendar	1265
Buddhist calendar	859
Burmese calendar	−323
Byzantine calendar	5823–5824
Chinese calendar	甲戌年 (Wood Dog); 3012 or 2805 — to — 乙亥年 (Wood Pig); 3013 or 2806
Coptic calendar	31–32
Discordian calendar	1481
Ethiopian calendar	307–308
Hebrew calendar	4075–4076
- Hindu calendars
Vikram Samvat	371–372
Shaka Samvat	236–237
Kali Yuga	3415–3416
Holocene calendar	10315
Iranian calendar	307 BP – 306 BP
Islamic calendar	316 BH – 315 BH
Javanese calendar	195–196
Julian calendar	315; CCCXV
Korean calendar	2648
Minguo calendar	1597 before ROC 民前1597年
Nanakshahi calendar	−1153
Seleucid era	626/627 AG
Thai solar calendar	857–858
Tibetan calendar	ཤིང་ཕོ་ཁྱི་ལོ་ (male Wood-Dog); 441 or 60 or −712 — to — ཤིང་མོ་ཕག་ལོ་ (female Wood-Boar); 442 or 61 or −711

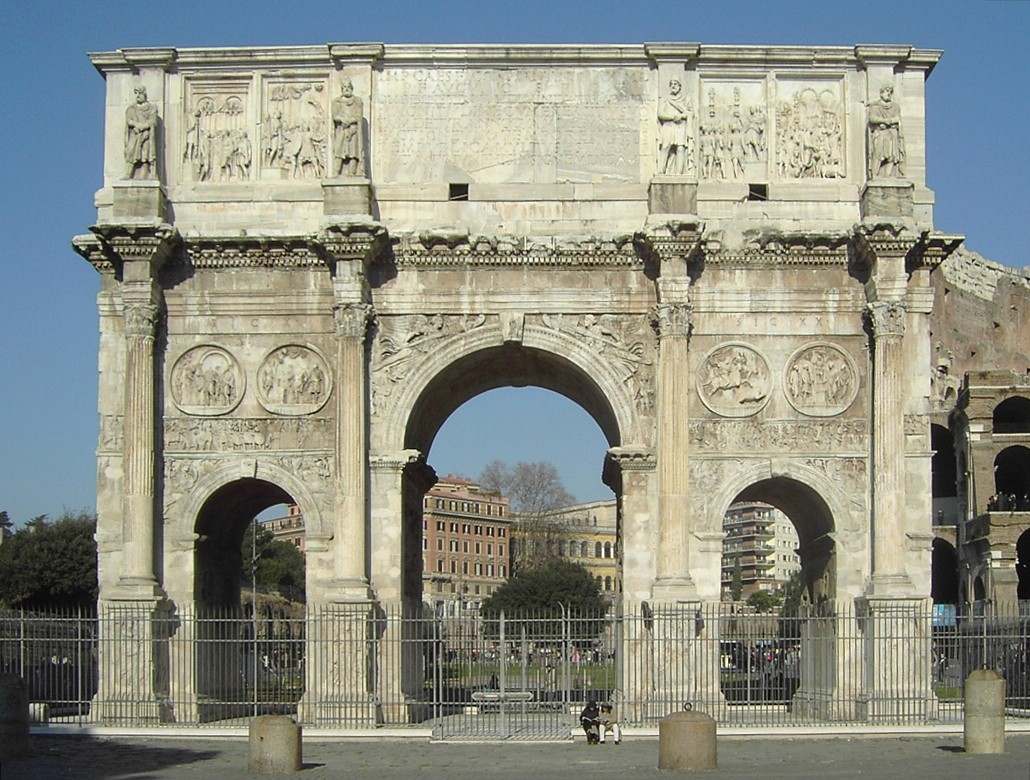
Arch of Constantine (Rome)

Year 315 (CCCXV) was a common year starting on Saturday of the Julian calendar. At the time, it was known in Rome as the Year of the Consulship of Constantinus and Licinianus (or, less frequently, year 1068 Ab urbe condita). The denomination 315 for this year has been used since the early medieval period, when the Anno Domini calendar era became the prevalent method in Europe for naming years.

== Events ==
=== By place ===
==== Roman Empire ====
- Constantine the Great and co-emperor Licinius battle the Sarmates, the Goths and the Carpians along the Danube. Constantine leads a punitive expedition into Dacia and reestablishes the Roman fortifications of the frontier.
- July 25 – The Arch of Constantine is completed near the Colosseum at Rome to commemorate Constantine's victory over Maxentius at the Milvian Bridge. As part of the ceremony Constantine is expected to make a sacrifice to Rome's traditional gods, but he refuses to do so.
- Constantine I dedicates the Basilica of Maxentius and installs a large statue of himself inside it.
- Crucifixion is abolished as punishment in the Roman Empire.
- A program of assistance to the poor is established in the Roman Empire.
- Immense baths are constructed in Augusta Treverorum (modern-day Trier).

=== By topic ===
==== Religion ====
- Eusebius becomes bishop of Caesarea (approximate date).
- The lamb becomes the symbol of Jesus in Christian art.

== Births ==
- Flavius Hannibalianus, ruler of Armenia and Pontus (d. 337)
- Hilary of Poitiers, Christian bishop and Doctor of the Church
- Himerius, Greek sophist and rhetorician (approximate date)
- Vettius Agorius Praetextatus, Roman politician (d. 384)

== Deaths ==
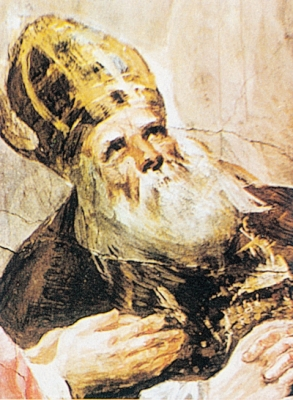
Saint Valerius of Saragossa

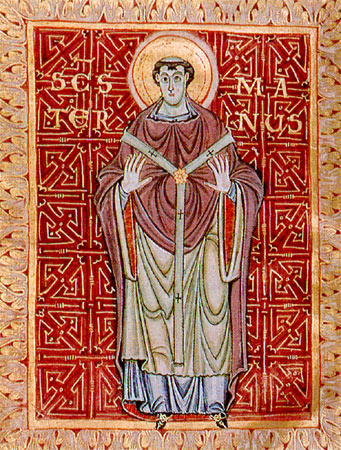
Saint Maternus of Cologne

- September 14 – Maternus of Cologne, bishop of Trier
- Du Tao (or Jingwen), Chinese general and rebel leader
- Galeria Valeria, Roman empress and wife of Galerius
- Prisca, Roman empress and wife of Diocletian (b. 247)
- Valerius of Saragossa, Christian bishop and martyr
