= Empress Dowager Dong =

Chinese Han dynasty empress dowager (died 189)

Empress Dowager Dong / Grand Empress Dowager Dong 董太后 / 董太皇太后
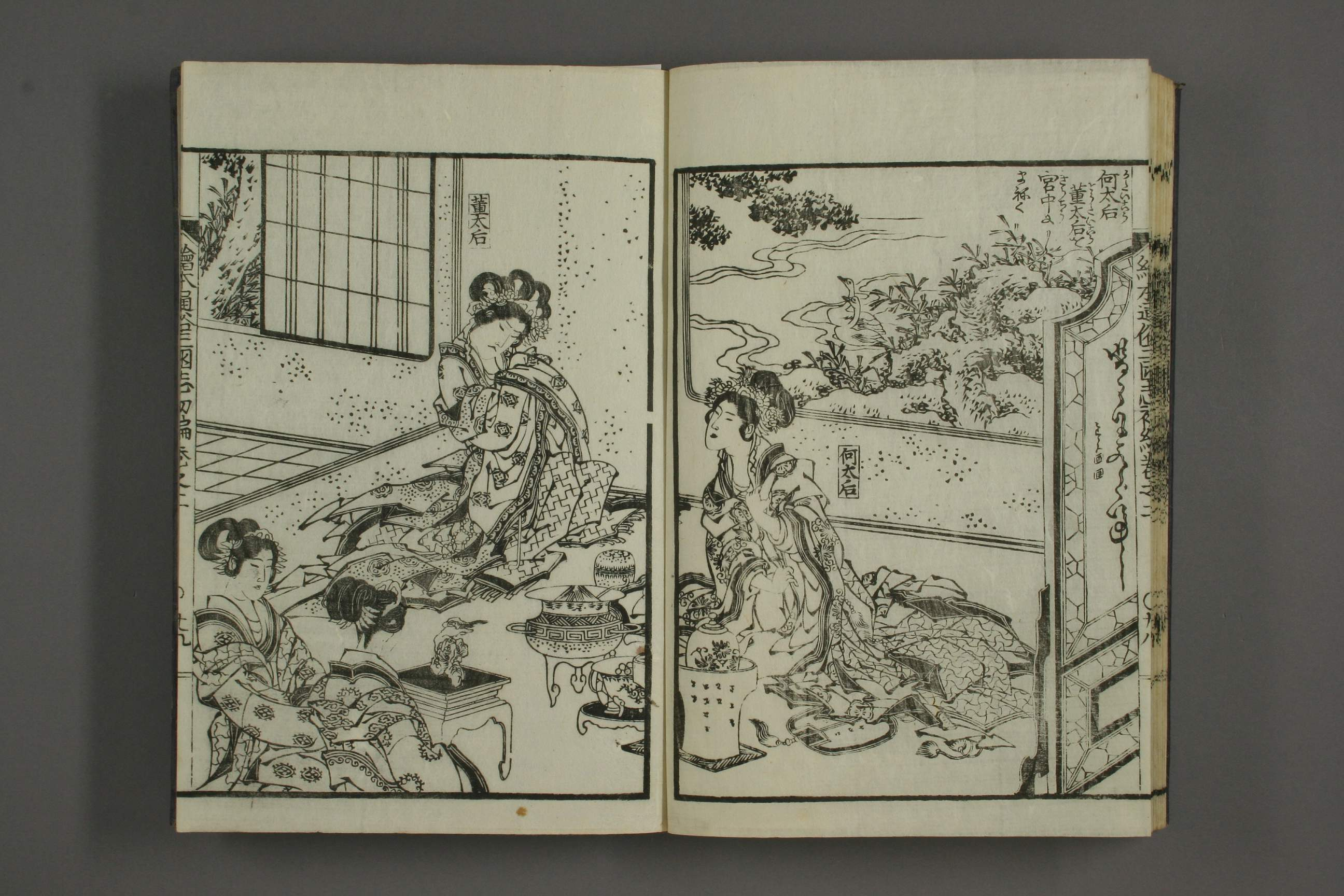
- 1836 illustration of Empress Dowager Dong (left)

Empress Dowager of the Han dynasty
- Tenure: 17 April 169 – 13 May 189
- Successor: Empress Lingsi

Grand Empress Dowager of the Han dynasty
- Tenure: 15 May - 7 July 189
- Born: Unknown
- Died: 7 July 189
- Spouse: Liu Chang
- Issue: Emperor Ling of Han
Posthumous name
- Empress Xiaoren (孝仁皇后)

Empress Dowager Dong (fl.156 - 7 July 189), personal name unknown, formally known as Empress Xiaoren, was an empress dowager of the Eastern Han dynasty of China. She was never empress throughout her early life because she was the wife of a marquis; she only became empress dowager because her son, Liu Hong (Emperor Ling), became the emperor by chance. During her son's reign, she developed a rivalry with her daughter-in-law, Empress He, because she wanted Emperor Ling's younger son, Liu Xie, to be crown prince while Empress He wanted her own son, Liu Bian to succeed his father. Emperor Ling died in May 189 before he managed to designate either of his two sons as crown prince. Liu Bian eventually took the throne as Emperor Shao; Empress Dowager Dong, as the emperor's grandmother, became grand empress dowager, while her daughter-in-law became empress dowager. Empress Dowager He eventually conspired with her brother, General-in-Chief He Jin, to unseat her mother-in-law from power. Grand Empress Dowager Dong died of illness shortly after her downfall; the common people held Empress Dowager He and her family responsible for the grand empress dowager's death.

== Life ==
Lady Dong was from Hejian Commandery (河間郡; around present-day Cangzhou, Hebei). She was the wife of Liu Chang (劉萇), the Marquis of Jiedu Village (解犢亭侯). (Liu Chang was a great-grandson of Liu Kai (劉開), the sixth son of Emperor Zhang.) In 156, she bore Liu Chang a son, Liu Hong. It is not known whether she had any other children.

In January 168, after Emperor Huan died without a son to succeed him, his wife Empress Dou (later empress dowager) selected 12-year-old Liu Hong, the Marquis of Jiedu Village, (Note: Liu Chang (劉萇) died before 168 so Liu Hong inherited his father's title and marquisate.) to be the new emperor. He is historically known as Emperor Ling. The newly crowned Emperor Ling awarded his late father the posthumous title "Emperor Xiaoren" (孝仁皇) and named his father's burial place "Shen Mausoleum" (慎陵); he also gave his mother the title "Honoured Lady of Shen Garden (慎園貴人)" in April or May 168. In 169, following the downfall of Empress Dowager Dou and her clan, Emperor Ling sent his attendants to fetch his mother from Hejian Commandery to live in Yongle Palace (永樂宮) in Luoyang, the imperial capital. He also honoured her as "Empress Xiaoren" (孝仁皇后) on 17 April 169, and appointed his mother's elder brother, Dong Chong (董寵), as Bearer of the Mace (執金吾). Dong Chong was later imprisoned for lying that he was acting on Empress Dowager Dong's order; he died in prison.

Empress Dowager Dong was not involved in state affairs until after Empress Dowager Dou's death in 172. She encouraged Emperor Ling to start the practice of selling government offices for money; this practice severely damaged the Han civil service system and led to widespread corruption. In 188, her nephew, Dong Zhong (董重), was promoted from Minister of the Guards (衛尉) to General of Agile Cavalry (驃騎將軍) and put in command of over 1,000 troops.

In 181, one of Emperor Ling's consorts, Beautiful Lady Wang (王美人), (Note: Beautiful Lady Wang (王美人) was from the Zhao State (趙國; in present-day Hebei). Her grandfather, Wang Bao (王苞), served as a General of the Household for All Purposes (五官中郎將) in the Han imperial court. She was not only beautiful in appearance, but also talented in arts and mathematics. After her death, Emperor Ling often mourned her by writing poetry dedicated to her.) bore him a son, Liu Xie (Emperor Xian). Beautiful Lady Wang was subsequently poisoned to death by Emperor Ling's empress, Empress He, so the motherless Liu Xie was raised by his grandmother. Empress Dowager Dong often urged Emperor Ling to designate one of his only two surviving sons, Liu Xie and Liu Bian (born to Empress He), as crown prince. Empress He and Empress Dowager Dong became engaged in a rivalry because they wanted Liu Bian and Liu Xie respectively to be crown prince. Emperor Ling died in 189 before he could name one of them as his successor.

Despite the machinations of Jian Shuo (a eunuch and close aide of Emperor Ling) to put Liu Xie on the throne, Empress He and her brother, General-in-Chief He Jin, succeeded in making Liu Bian emperor; Liu Bian is historically known as Emperor Shao. As the mother of the reigning emperor, Empress He became empress dowager, while Empress Dowager Dong became grand empress dowager. The empress dowager and grand empress dowager started vying for influence in court politics; their respective pillars of support, He Jin and Dong Zhong, were also locked in a power struggle. Grand Empress Dowager Dong contemplated getting Dong Zhong to help her eliminate He Jin. When Empress Dowager He heard about it, she informed He Jin and another brother of hers, He Miao (何苗). They decided to take preemptive action against the grand empress dowager.

One day, He Jin, He Miao and their supporters found an excuse to remove Grand Empress Dowager Dong from Yongle Palace and send her back to her hometown in Hejian Commandery, so they raised their idea in the imperial court. The court officials and Empress Dowager He approved the idea. He Jin then sent his troops to surround Dong Zhong's residence and arrest him; he committed suicide later. Grand Empress Dowager Dong sank into paranoia and depression after hearing news of Dong Zhong's death and died of illness in 189 after being in power for about 22 years. The common people blamed Empress Dowager He and her family for the grand empress dowager's death. Grand Empress Dowager Dong's remains were transported back to Hejian Commandery and buried alongside her husband's in the Shen Mausoleum.

== See also ==
- Lists of people of the Three Kingdoms
