= Empress Song (Han dynasty) =

Empress of China from 171 to 178

Empress Song 宋皇后

Empress of the Han dynasty
- Tenure: 12 October 171 – c.November 178
- Predecessor: Empress Huansi
- Successor: Empress Lingsi
- Born: Unknown
- Died: c. November 178
- Spouse: Emperor Ling of Han
- Father: Song Feng

Empress Song (died 178) was an empress of the Han dynasty of China. She was Emperor Ling's first wife, and later became a victim of the powerful eunuchs.

== Family background and marriage to Emperor Ling ==
The later Empress Song was born into a clan that was honoured, but not particularly powerful, during the Eastern Han dynasty. Her father Song Feng (宋酆) was a grandnephew of Consort Song, the imperial consort of Emperor Zhang who gave birth to his first crown prince Liu Qing. During the early reign of Emperor Ling, Song Feng served as the commander of the capital (Luoyang) defence forces. Her paternal aunt was the consort of Liu Kui (劉悝), the Prince of Bohai (勃海王), a younger brother of Emperor Ling's predecessor Emperor Huan.

In 170, Lady Song was selected to be an imperial consort with the rank of guiren. On 12 October 171, even though she was not a favoured consort, she was created empress, perhaps because of her noble lineage. Song Feng was created a marquis.

== The Liu Kui incident, fall and death ==
However, even after becoming empress, Empress Song never had Emperor Ling's favour. This, combined with her weak personality, emboldened the concubines who wanted to replace her; these concubines then often defamed her. What proved to be more damaging to her was the "Liu Kui incident".

In c.February 165, Liu Kui had been demoted due to treason; he then approached powerful eunuch Wang Fu (王甫) and promised him a large sum of money if Wang Fu could persuade Emperor Huan to restore his title. On 20 January 168, Emperor Huan's edict restored Liu Kui to the title of Prince of Bohai. However, Liu Kui did not fulfill his promise. In return, Wang Fu falsely accused Liu Kui of treason in c.November 172; Liu Kui was forced to commit suicide, and his entire household was executed. Thereafter, Wang Fu and his confederates became constantly concerned that if Empress Song became powerful, she would avenge her aunt, who was Liu Kui's consort. They therefore joined with the concubines to falsely accuse her of using witchcraft against Emperor Ling.

In c.November 178, Emperor Ling finally believed them and deposed Empress Song. Empress Song was imprisoned and died in despair. Her father Song Feng and her brothers were all executed. Song Qi (宋奇), formally the Marquis of Yinqiang (隐强侯), who was also executed, was probably a brother of the empress; and as his wife was a younger cousin of Cao Cao, Cao Cao was dismissed from his post as the Prefect of Dunqiu. Some of the eunuchs not involved in the plot who took pity on the late empress gathered her body and those of her family members and gave them proper burials, but as commoners.

Chinese royalty
| Preceded by Empress Dou Miao | Empress of Eastern Han Dynasty; 171–178 | Succeeded by Empress He |
