= Jian Shuo =

Chinese Han dynasty eunuch and general (died 189)

- 蹇碩

Colonel of the Upper Army (上軍校尉)
- In office 188 – May 189
- Monarch: Emperor Ling of Han

Personal details
- Born: Unknown
- Died: c.May 189
- Occupation: Eunuch

Jian Shuo
- Traditional Chinese: 蹇碩
- Simplified Chinese: 寋硕
Transcriptions
Standard Mandarin
- Hanyu Pinyin: Jiǎn Shuò

Jian Shuo (died c. May 189) was the leader of the eunuch faction in the imperial court during the late Eastern Han dynasty of China. Along with Zhang Rang, Jian Shuo eventually became a leading member of the Ten Attendants, who became the most powerful eunuchs during the time. When Emperor Ling of Han died in May 189, Jian Shuo wanted to enthrone Emperor Ling's younger son, Liu Xie, and kill Empress Dowager He's brother, He Jin (uncle of Emperor Ling's older son Liu Bian). However, the plot was discovered by He Jin and foiled. When Liu Bian ascended to the throne as Emperor Shao, He Jin had Jian Shuo arrested and executed.

== See also ==
- Lists of people of the Three Kingdoms
- Ten Attendants
