= Empress He (Han dynasty) =

Empress of China from 181 to 189

Empress He / Empress Dowager He 何皇后 / 何太后
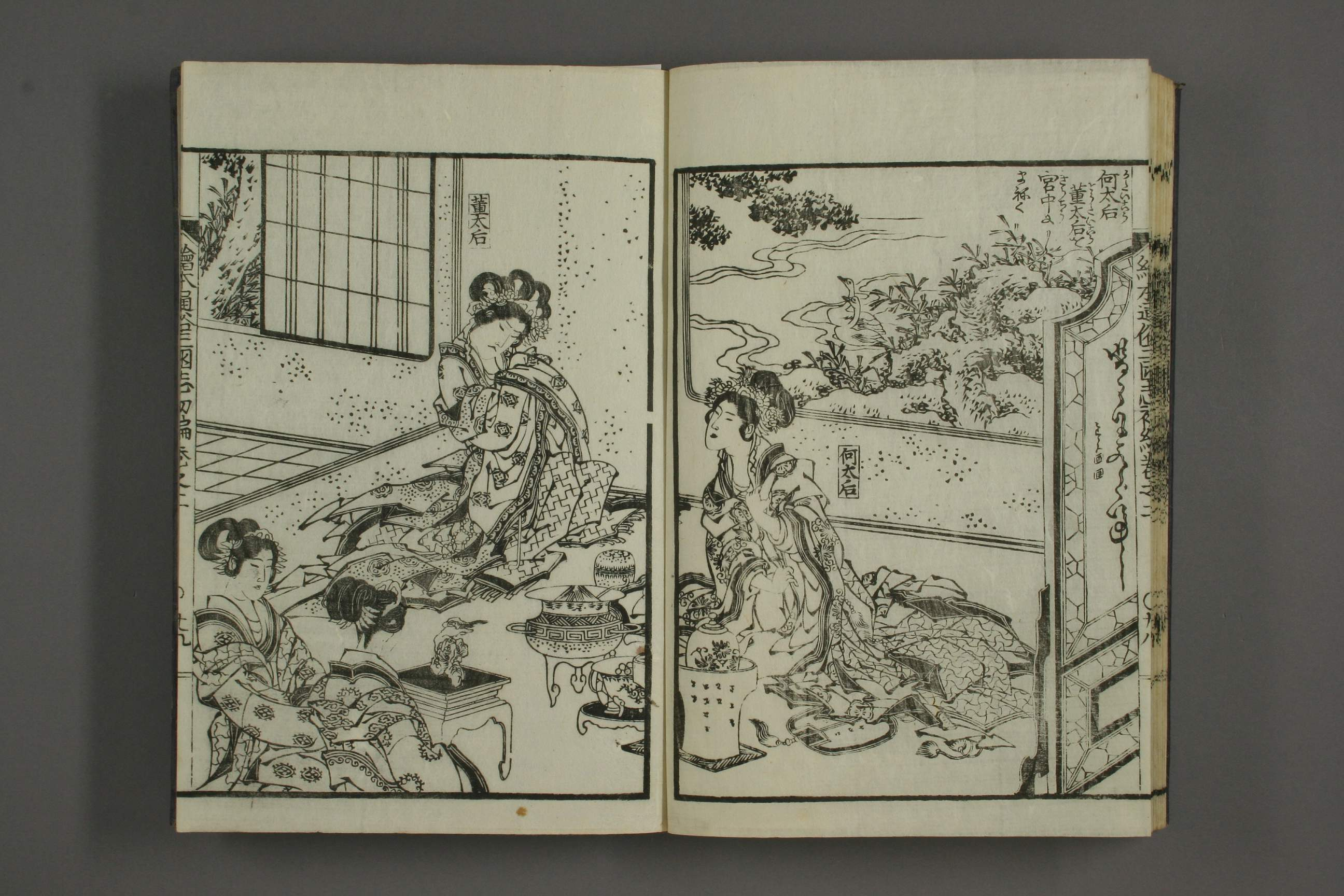
- 1836 illustration of Empres He (right) with Empress Dowager Dong (left)

Empress consort of the Han dynasty
- Tenure: 8 Jan 181 – 13 May 189
- Predecessor: Empress Song
- Successor: Empress Fu

Empress dowager of the Han dynasty
- Tenure: 15 May – 30 Sep 189
- Predecessor: Empress Xiaoren
- Born: Unknown
- Died: 30 September 189
- Spouse: Emperor Ling of Han
- Issue: Emperor Shao of Han
Posthumous name
- Empress Lingsi (靈思皇后)
- Father: He Zhen
- Mother: Lady of Wuyang

Empress He (died 30 September 189 (Note: While Lady He's birth year was not recorded, her son Liu Bian was born in 173/6. Thus, her birth year should be in or before 161.)), personal name unknown, posthumously known as Empress Lingsi, was an empress of the Eastern Han dynasty. She was the second empress consort of Emperor Ling and the mother of Emperor Shao. After the death of Emperor Ling in 189, she became empress dowager when her young son, Liu Bian (Emperor Shao), became the new emperor. She was caught up in the conflict between her paternal half-brother, General-in-Chief He Jin, and the eunuch faction, who were both vying for power in the Han imperial court. After He Jin's assassination and the elimination of the eunuch faction, the warlord Dong Zhuo took advantage of the power vacuum to lead his forces into the imperial capital and seize control of the Han central government. Dong Zhuo subsequently deposed Emperor Shao, replaced him with Liu Xie (Emperor Xian) and had Empress Dowager He poisoned to death.

== Family background and early years ==
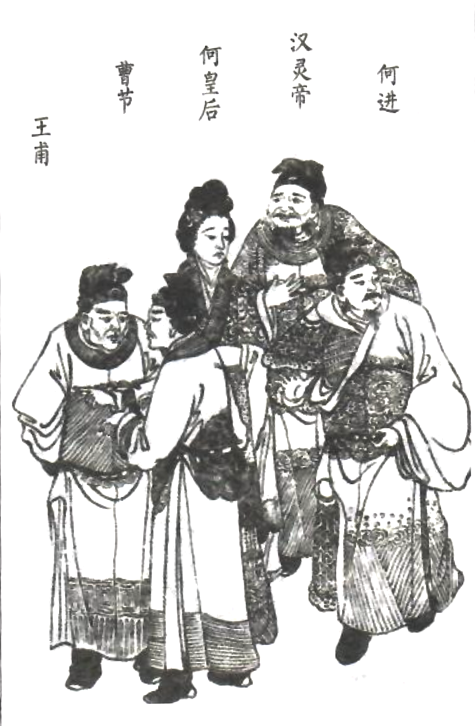
1935 Illustration of Empress He (back left) along with other figures from the Late Eastern Han court

Lady He was from Wan County (宛縣), Nanyang Commandery (南陽郡), which is in present-day Nanyang, Henan. Unlike most Han dynasty empresses, she was not of noble birth; her father, He Zhen (何真), was a butcher. Her mother's maiden family name is unknown, but her given name was "Xing" (興). She had two half-brothers, He Jin (same father) and He Miao (何苗; same mother), and a younger sister who married the (adopted) son of the eunuch Zhang Rang.

According to legends, she joined Emperor Ling's imperial harem after her family bribed the eunuchs tasked with selecting women to serve the emperor. She was seven chi and one cun tall. In 176, she bore Emperor Ling a son, Liu Bian, who turned out to be the emperor's oldest surviving son because his other sons born before Liu Bian died in infancy or childhood. As Emperor Ling believed that he lost his previous sons due to bad luck, he ordered Shi Zimiao (史子眇), a Taoist, to raise his newborn son; Liu Bian was given the title "Marquis Shi" (史侯). Lady He became highly favoured by Emperor Ling, who awarded her the rank of "Honoured Lady" (貴人). Honoured Lady He was known for being jealous and cruel. The other women in Emperor Ling's harem were afraid of her.

== As empress consort ==
On 8 January 181, Emperor Ling instated Honoured Lady He as Empress to replace Empress Song, whom he deposed in 178. The following year, the emperor bestowed titles on Empress He's parents to honour them: her deceased father, He Zhen, received the posthumous appointment "General of Chariots of Cavalry" (車騎將軍) and the title "Marquis Xuande of Wuyang" (舞陽宣德侯); her mother was given the title "Lady of Wuyang" (舞陽君).

Around the time, one of Emperor Ling's consorts, Beautiful Lady Wang (王美人), (Note: Beautiful Lady Wang (王美人) was from the Zhao State (趙國; in present-day Hebei). Her grandfather, Wang Bao (王苞), served as a General of the Household for All Purposes (五官中郎將) in the Han imperial court. She was not only beautiful in appearance, but also talented in arts and mathematics. After her death, Emperor Ling often mourned her by writing poetry dedicated to her.) became pregnant. As she feared that Empress He would harm her unborn child, she attempted to cause a miscarriage by consuming drugs, but her child remained safe, and she had dreams about the sun. In 181, after Beautiful Lady Wang gave birth to a son, Liu Xie, Empress He ordered her to be poisoned to death. Emperor Ling was furious when he found out and he wanted to depose Empress He, but the eunuchs managed to persuade him to spare the empress. The motherless Liu Xie was raised by his grandmother, Empress Dowager Dong, and given the title "Marquis Dong" (董侯).

When his subjects asked him to name one of his sons as crown prince, Emperor Ling had a dilemma between Liu Bian and Liu Xie, his only two surviving sons. He felt that Liu Bian was unfit to be emperor because he was frivolous and unable to command respect, so he preferred Liu Xie. However, he was also worried that if he chose Liu Xie, Empress He would turn to her half-brother, He Jin, for help. He Jin held the position of General-in-Chief (大將軍) and was a highly influential figure in the imperial court. He ultimately did not name either of his sons as crown prince.

== As empress dowager ==
When Emperor Ling became critically ill in 189, he secretly entrusted his eight-year-old son Liu Xie to close aide and eunuch, Jian Shuo. Upon Emperor Ling's death, Jian Shuo attempted to lure He Jin into a trap in the palace, assassinate him, and then install Liu Xie on the throne. However, Pan Yin (潘隱), a eunuch who was also an acquaintance of He Jin, warned the General-in-Chief of Jian Shuo's plot. He Jin returned to his military camp and pretended to be sick, so he did not need to respond when summoned to enter the palace. Jian Shuo's plan to make Liu Xie emperor failed, so a 13-year-old Liu Bian was enthroned and became historically known as Emperor Shao. Empress He, as the emperor's mother, became empress dowager and attended imperial court sessions alongside her son. As Emperor Shao was still young, General-in-Chief He Jin and Grand Tutor Yuan Wei (袁隗) served as his regents.

In the summer of 189, after Jian Shuo learnt that He Jin and his subordinates were plotting to eliminate him, he tried to persuade his fellow eunuchs to join him in his plan to assassinate He Jin. However, they were persuaded by Guo Sheng (郭勝), a eunuch close to Empress Dowager He, to reject Jian Shuo's idea. He Jin subsequently had Jian Shuo arrested and executed, and then took control of the military units previously under Jian's command. In the autumn of 189, Yuan Shao suggested to He Jin to eliminate the eunuch faction and consolidate power. Empress Dowager He immediately rejected the idea because it required her to interact with men on a regular basis, which she found offensive and immodest. Empress Dowager He's mother (the Lady of Wuyang) and He Miao (何苗) had been bribed by the eunuchs to protect them, so they also strongly opposed He Jin's plan, saying that they owed much to the eunuchs. (Empress Dowager He became Emperor Ling's consort because the eunuchs helped her.)

He Jin then heeded an alternative suggestion from Yuan Shao: he secretly instructed a few provincial military officials or warlords (Dong Zhuo, Wang Kuang, Qiao Mao and Ding Yuan) to lead their troops to the vicinity of Luoyang, the imperial capital, and openly demand that the eunuchs be executed – in the hope of pressuring Empress Dowager He to take action against the eunuchs. Empress Dowager He initially refused to harm the eunuchs, but as Dong Zhuo's forces approached Luoyang, she ordered the eunuchs to leave the palace and return to their marquisates. (Many of the eunuchs were made marquises by Emperor Ling.) Empress Dowager He's younger sister married the adopted son of Zhang Rang, the eunuch leader. Zhang Rang pleaded with her to help him, so she informed her mother (the Lady of Wuyang), who in turn spoke to Empress Dowager He. The empress dowager relented and summoned the eunuchs back to the palace.

Around late August or September 189, the eunuchs hatched a plot to assassinate He Jin. They issued a fake imperial order in Empress Dowager He's name, instructing He Jin to enter the palace to meet her. He Jin fell into an ambush and died at the hands of the eunuchs, who declared him guilty of treason. After He Jin's death, his subordinates Wu Kuang (吳匡) and Zhang Zhang (張璋), along with Yuan Shao, Yuan Shu and others, led their troops to storm the palace and kill the eunuchs in revenge. They indiscriminately slaughtered anyone who looked like a eunuch; some young men who had no facial hair, in desperation, dropped their pants in front of the soldiers to prove that they were not eunuchs. During the attack, the eunuchs took Empress Dowager He, Emperor Shao and the Prince of Chenliu (Liu Xie) hostage and tried to flee from the palace. Lu Zhi intercepted the eunuch Duan Gui (段珪) and saved the empress dowager from him. He Miao, who was sympathetic towards the eunuchs, was killed by Wu Kuang and Dong Zhuo's younger brother Dong Min (董旻). Over 2,000 people died in the attack. Emperor Shao and the Prince of Chenliu, who were taken out of the palace by the eunuchs during the chaos, were eventually found near the riverbank and saved by Lu Zhi and Min Gong (閔貢), who brought them back safely.

== Death ==
The warlord Dong Zhuo ultimately led his forces into Luoyang, the imperial capital, and took advantage of the power vacuum to seize control of the Han central government. On 28 September 189, he deposed Emperor Shao (who was demoted to "Prince of Hongnong") and replaced him with Liu Xie (the Prince of Chenliu), who is historically known as Emperor Xian. A tearful Empress Dowager He watched as her son was forcefully pulled away from his throne, while the officials watched and did not dare to say anything for fear of antagonising Dong Zhuo. Dong Zhuo subsequently relocated Empress Dowager He to Yong'an Palace (永安宮) after claiming her involvement in the death of her mother-in-law, and had her poisoned to death there on 30 September. He also killed the empress dowager's mother, the Lady of Wuyang (舞陽君). Dong Zhuo then forced Emperor Xian to attend the empress dowager's funeral on 29 October 189 at Fengchang Village (奉常亭), a district of Luoyang. The officials who attended the funeral were dressed in plain colours but not proper mourning attire; the entire ceremony did not befit her status as an empress dowager, as Dong claimed that she had already been deposed. She was buried in the Wenzhao Mausoleum (文昭陵) with Emperor Ling as an empress instead of empress dowager, and posthumously honoured as "Empress Lingsi" (靈思皇后).

== See also ==
- Lists of people of the Three Kingdoms

== Notes ==
Chinese royalty
Preceded by Empress Song	Empress of Eastern Han Dynasty; 180–189	Succeeded by Empress Fu Shou
