= He Jin =

Han dynasty regent and general (died 189)

- 何進
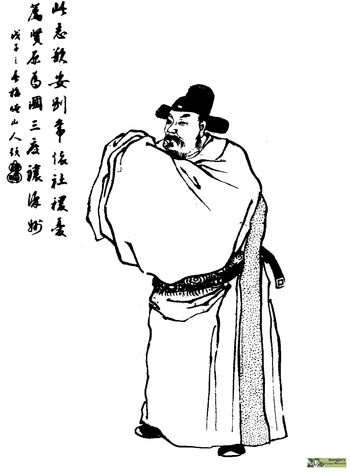

General-in-Chief (大將軍)
- In office 184 – 22 September 189
- Monarch: Emperor Ling of Han / Emperor Shao of Han

Intendant of Henan (河南尹)
- In office 180–184
- Monarch: Emperor Ling of Han

Court Architect (將作大匠)
- In office 180–184
- Monarch: Emperor Ling of Han

Palace Attendant
- In office 180–184
- Monarch: Emperor Ling of Han

Administrator of Yingchuan (潁川太守)
- In office ?–180
- Monarch: Emperor Ling of Han

Personal details
- Born: Unknown Nanyang, Henan
- Died: 22 September 189 Luoyang, Henan
- Parent: He Zhen (father)
- Relatives: Empress Lingsi (half-sister); He Miao (step-brother (Note: He Miao had no blood relations with He Jin, as He Miao shared the same mother with Empress Lingsi; his original surname was Zhu. He Zhen was Zhu Miao's mother's second husband.)); Emperor Shao (nephew); one other sister (wife of (adopted) son of eunuch Zhang Rang)
- Occupation: Military general, politician
- Courtesy name: Suigao (遂高)
- Peerage: Marquis of Shen (慎侯)

Military service
- Allegiance: Han Empire
- Unit: Han Imperial Forces
- Battles/wars: Yellow Turban Rebellion; Massacre of the Eunuchs

He Jin (died 22 September 189), courtesy name Suigao, was a Chinese military general and politician of the Eastern Han dynasty, serving as military Grand Marshal and regent. He was an elder half-brother of Empress He (the empress consort of Emperor Ling), and a maternal uncle of Emperor Shao. In 189, he and his sister shared power as regents when the young Emperor Shao was put on the throne following Emperor Ling's death. During the time, the conflict between He Jin and the influential eunuch faction intensified. After they overheard a conversation between He Jin and the empress dowager, the eunuch faction lured him into a trap in the imperial palace and assassinated him. While He Jin's subordinates, led by Yuan Shao, slaughtered the eunuch faction in revenge, Dong Zhuo took advantage of the power vacuum to enter the imperial capital Luoyang and seize control of the Han central government. Dong Zhuo's seizure of control and the subsequent breakdown of central command that followed brought forth the beginning of massive civil wars that lasted for nearly a century, during which time the Han dynasty came to an end and the Three Kingdoms period began in its place.

== Life ==
He Jin was born into a family of butchers in Nanyang, hometown of the dynastic founder Emperor Guangwu. During the reign of Emperor Ling, his younger half-sister entered the palace and soon became one of the emperor's favourites. In January 181, she was made empress and He Jin henceforth began a speedy escalation up the bureaucratic ladder.

When the Yellow Turban Rebellion erupted in 184, He Jin was appointed General-in-Chief (大將軍). He commanded the imperial armory, secured strategic forts around the capital and moved quickly to crush the uprising at Luoyang led by Ma Yuanyi (馬元義), a follower of the rebel leader, Zhang Jue. The campaign was deemed a success and He Jin was enfeoffed as the Marquis of Shen (慎侯). After the rebellion was quelled, He Jin continued in the role of General-in-Chief, technically in control of all the imperial armies. During this time, other members of his family, such as his younger step-brother He Miao (何苗), were also elevated to positions of importance.

In 188, perhaps as a counterweight to the power of the He family, Emperor Ling created the Army of the Western Garden. The emperor ostentatiously paraded in front of the army and had himself named "Supreme General" (無上將軍). The emperor also had the army placed under the command of Jian Shuo, a trusted eunuch. By commanding the Army of the Western Garden, the emperor could put He Jin under his own command. The military prowess of this new army was never showcased, however, as it was disbanded less than a year later.

When Emperor Ling died in May 189, the stage was set for a showdown between He Jin and the eunuch faction. Jian Shuo plotted to lure He Jin into a trap at the imperial palace where he would be assassinated. However, when He Jin arrived, a minor official named Pan Yin (潘隱) subtly warned He Jin about Jian Shuo's plot. Astonished, He Jin returned to his camp and evaded the assassination attempt. Afterward, He Jin had Jian Shuo arrested and executed, and then he seized command of the troops previously under Jian Shuo's command.

With the support of the elite Yuan family, particularly Yuan Shao and Yuan Shu, the succession dispute was resolved in favour of Liu Bian, the son of Empress He, who ascended the throne in the fifth month of that year and became known as Emperor Shao. He Jin and his sister, now the Empress Dowager, jointly took on the role of regent.

During the summer months, He Jin and his subordinates engaged the eunuch faction in court politics. The eunuchs, now without a military power base of their own, relied on the support of Empress Dowager He and He Miao. At the urging of Yuan Shao, He Jin summoned the general Dong Zhuo (董卓) to the outskirts of Luoyang, in an attempt to force the Empress Dowager to back down. In the ninth month of that year, He Jin entered the palace to request the Empress Dowager agree to the execution of the eunuchs. However, unbeknownst to He Jin and the Empress Dowager, a spy was planted within the Imperial Palace by the leader of the eunuch faction, Zhang Rang, to deliberately overhear the conversation between the two. Once they received word of what He Jin and the Empress Dowager were plotting, the eunuchs forged a fake summons letter in the name of the Empress Dowager and had it delivered to He Jin. Unlike with Jian Shuo's plot, however, He Jin made the mistake of falling for the trap, as he arrived to the palace without his escort and was thereafter brutally murdered by the eunuchs, with his head thrown outside the Imperial Palace.

After hearing of He Jin's death, Yuan Shao and Yuan Shu, both with significant control of military forces within the capital, stormed the palace and massacred the eunuchs. Dong Zhuo took advantage of the massive power vacuum to seize control of the capital. As soon as he held supremacy over the capital, Dong Zhuo deposed Emperor Shao in favour of the Prince of Chenliu, who came to be known as Emperor Xian. The deposition as well as Dong Zhuo's subsequent atrocities incurred the wrath of many. In 190, warlords from the eastern provinces formed a coalition to oust Dong Zhuo, which kicked off a series of civil wars that were to last for nearly a century.

== Family ==
He Jin had at least two half-siblings and a step-brother:

- Empress He, the empress consort of Emperor Ling and mother of Emperor Shao
- Lady He, full sister of Empress He, who married the adopted son of the eunuch Zhang Rang
- Step-brother: He Miao (何苗), courtesy name Shuda (叔達), born "Zhu Miao" (朱苗), an elder half-brother of Empress He born of the same mother. Thus, He Miao is actually not blood-related to He Jin. He served as General of Chariots and Cavalry (車騎將軍), and was killed by He Jin's subordinate Wu Kuang (吳匡; father of Wu Ban) and Dong Zhuo's brother Dong Min in late September 189 (after He Jin's death) for sympathizing with the eunuch faction who assassinated He Jin.

According to historical sources, it is widely believed that He Jin had at least one son, He Xian (何咸), who survived the downfall of the He family in 189, and who had a son, He Yan (c. 196–249). As He Xian died early, his wife Lady Yin (尹夫人) remarried and became a concubine of the warlord Cao Cao, who adopted He Yan. However, He Yan was buried at Lujiang when one's place of burial was customarily the ancestral home, which contradicts the fact that He Jin was from Nanyang; so He Yan was probably a grandson of He Miao, as Weilue suggests, while it was recorded that there had actually been several families of the Zhu clan, which might be the clan that He Miao was from, at Lujiang during Eastern Han.

== See also ==
- Lists of people of the Three Kingdoms
