= Liu Bian =

Emperor of the Han dynasty in 189

Liu Bian 劉辯

Emperor of the Han dynasty
- Reign: 15 May – 28 September 189
- Predecessor: Emperor Ling
- Successor: Emperor Xian
- Regent: He Jin; Dong Zhuo

Prince of Hongnong (弘農王)
- Tenure: 28 September 189 – 26 March 190
- Born: 176
- Died: 26 March 190 (aged 13–14)
- Consorts: Consort Tang
Posthumous name
- Prince Huai of Hongnong (弘農懷王)
- House: Han dynasty
- Father: Emperor Ling
- Mother: Empress Lingsi

Liu Bian
- Traditional Chinese: 劉辯
- Simplified Chinese: 刘辩
Transcriptions
Standard Mandarin
- Hanyu Pinyin: Liú Biàn

Prince of Hongnong
- Traditional Chinese: 弘農王
- Simplified Chinese: 弘农王
Transcriptions
Standard Mandarin
- Hanyu Pinyin: Hóngnóng Wáng

Emperor Shao of Han
- Traditional Chinese: 漢少帝
- Simplified Chinese: 汉少帝
Transcriptions
Standard Mandarin
- Hanyu Pinyin: Hàn Shàodì

Liu Bian (176 (Note: Most historical records state that Liu Bian was born in 176. However, the Book of the Later Han, in his mother Empress Lingsi's biography, recorded that he died at age 17 in 190, which means he was born in 173. Since the 176 date appears more frequently in historical records, it is assumed to be the correct one. In his Zizhi Tongjian Kaoyi, Sima Guang noted the two possible birth years; Tongjian itself recorded that Liu was 14 (by East Asian reckoning) when he ascended the throne in 189.) – 26 March 190), also known as Emperor Shao of Han and the Prince of Hongnong, was the 29th emperor of the Han dynasty and the 13th emperor of the Eastern Han dynasty in China. He became emperor around the age of 13 upon the death of his father, Emperor Ling, and ruled briefly from 15 May to 28 September 189 before he was deposed, after which he became known as the "Prince of Hongnong". His emperor title, "Emperor Shao" (literally "young emperor"), was also used by other emperors who were in power for very short periods of time. In March 190, he was poisoned by Dong Zhuo, who deposed him and replaced him with his younger half-brother, Liu Xie (Emperor Xian).

== Family background ==
Liu Bian was born in 176 to Liu Hong (Emperor Ling) and one of his consorts, Lady He. At the time of his birth, he was Emperor Ling's only son because the emperor's other sons who were born before Liu Bian died prematurely. As Emperor Ling believed that he lost his previous sons due to bad luck, he ordered Shi Zimiao (史子眇), a Taoist, to raise his newborn son; Liu Bian was given the title "Marquis Shi" (史侯). Liu Bian's mother, Lady He, became empress on 8 January 181. A few months later in April, another of Emperor Ling's consorts, Beautiful Lady Wang (王美人), gave birth to a son, Liu Xie. Empress He, in her jealousy, had Beautiful Lady Wang poisoned to death. The motherless Liu Xie was raised by his grandmother, Empress Dowager Dong, and given the title "Marquis Dong" (董侯).

When his subjects asked him to name one of his sons as crown prince, Emperor Ling had a dilemma between Liu Bian and Liu Xie, his only two surviving sons. He felt that Liu Bian was unfit to be emperor because he was frivolous and unable to command respect, so he preferred Liu Xie. However, he was also worried that if he chose Liu Xie, Empress He would turn to her half-brother, He Jin, for help. He Jin held the position of General-in-Chief (大將軍) and was a highly influential figure in the imperial court. He ultimately did not name either of his sons as crown prince.

== Reign ==
When Emperor Ling became critically ill in 189, he secretly entrusted an eight-year-old Liu Xie to a close aide and eunuch, Jian Shuo. Upon the emperor's death, Jian Shuo attempted to lure He Jin into a trap in the palace, assassinate him, and then install Liu Xie on the throne. Jian Shuo's plan to make Liu Xie emperor ultimately failed, so a 13-year-old Liu Bian was enthroned and became historically known as Emperor Shao. Empress He, as the emperor's mother, became empress dowager and attended imperial court sessions alongside her son. As Emperor Shao was still young, General-in-Chief He Jin and Grand Tutor Yuan Wei (袁隗) served as his regents.

In the summer of 189, after learning that Jian Shuo wanted to assassinate him, He Jin and his supporters launched a preemptive move against the eunuch and had him arrested and executed. Months later, Yuan Shao suggested to He Jin to eliminate the eunuch faction and consolidate power. Although Empress Dowager He strongly objected to He Jin's plan, the General-in-Chief, acting on Yuan Shao's advice, attempted to push his idea. He instigated a few regional warlords to lead their troops into the vicinity of Luoyang, the imperial capital, and openly demand that the eunuchs be executed – in the hope of pressuring Empress Dowager He into agreeing. The empress dowager, however, sided with and protected the eunuchs. In retaliation, the eunuchs hatched a plot to assassinate He Jin: they issued a fake imperial order in Empress Dowager He's name, instructing He Jin to enter the imperial palace, where he fell into an ambush and was killed by the eunuchs.

After He Jin's death, his subordinates Wu Kuang (吳匡) and Zhang Zhang (張璋), along with Yuan Shao, Yuan Shu and others, led their troops to storm the palace and kill the eunuchs in revenge. They indiscriminately slaughtered anyone who looked like a eunuch; some young men who had no facial hair, in desperation, dropped their pants in front of the soldiers to prove that they were not eunuchs. During the attack, the eunuchs took Emperor Shao, the Prince of Chenliu (Liu Xie) and Empress Dowager He hostage and tried to flee from the palace. Lu Zhi intercepted the eunuch Duan Gui (段珪) and saved the empress dowager from him. He Jin's younger brother, He Miao, who was sympathetic towards the eunuchs, was killed by Wu Kuang and Dong Min (董旻). Over 2,000 people died in the attack.

Emperor Shao and Liu Xie, who were taken out of the palace by the eunuchs during the chaos, were eventually found near the riverbank and saved by Lu Zhi and Min Gong (閔貢). As Lu Zhi and Min Gong were escorting the emperor and prince back to the imperial palace, they were intercepted by forces under the command of Dong Zhuo, one of the warlords initially summoned by He Jin to put pressure on Empress Dowager He. When Dong Zhuo met them, Emperor Shao was so shocked that he could not express his thoughts clearly. In contrast, Liu Xie had no difficulty in describing what happened and, in Dong Zhuo's impression, behaved more like an emperor than Emperor Shao. Dong Zhuo thus conceived the idea of deposing Emperor Shao and replacing him with Liu Xie.

== Deposal and death ==
After escorting the emperor and prince back to Luoyang, Dong Zhuo took advantage of the power vacuum created by the conflict between He Jin and the eunuch faction to seize control of the central government and imperial court. Many officials and the imperial troops stationed in Luoyang felt intimidated by the elite, battle-tested soldiers whom Dong Zhuo brought along with him from Liang Province. Dong Zhuo eventually had Emperor Shao deposed and replaced with Liu Xie, who became historically known as Emperor Xian. The former Emperor Shao was given the honorary title "Prince of Hongnong". Later that year, Dong Zhuo had Empress Dowager He poisoned to death in Yong'an Palace (永安宮).

In early 190, after a coalition of warlords launched a campaign against Dong Zhuo in the name of freeing Emperor Xian and the central government from his control, Dong Zhuo became worried that the warlords might restore the Prince of Hongnong to the throne and hence threaten the legitimacy of the government he controlled in Luoyang. Within a month after the campaign started, Dong Zhuo sent his adviser Li Ru to force the prince to commit suicide by drinking poisoned wine. The prince was allowed to bid his wife, Consort Tang, and other concubines farewell before succumbing to his fate. He was buried in a tomb originally constructed for the eunuch Zhao Zhong and later posthumously honoured as "Prince Huai of Hongnong" (弘農懷王).

== Era name ==
- Zhaoning (昭寧; Zhāoníng) (15 May – 28 September 189)

== Consorts ==
- Princess Consort of Hongnong, of the Tang clan (弘農王妃 唐氏)

== See also ==
- Chinese emperors family tree (early)#Han dynasty, Xin dynasty and Shu Han
- Lists of people of the Three Kingdoms

== Notes ==
Emperor Shao House of Liu Born: 176 Died: 6 March 190
Regnal titles
Preceded by Emperor Ling of Han	Emperor of China; Eastern Han; 189 with Empress Dowager He (189); He Jin (189)	Succeeded by Emperor Xian of Han
