= Emperor Xian of Han =

Emperor of the Han dynasty from 189 to 220

Emperor Xian of Han 漢獻帝
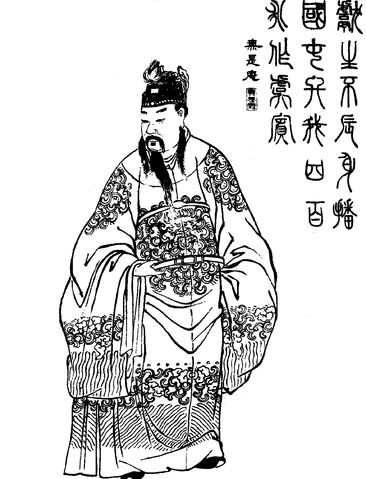
- A Qing dynasty illustration of Emperor Xian

Emperor of the Han dynasty
- Reign: 28 September 189 – 11 December 220 (Note: According to Emperor Xian's biography in Book of the Later Han, Liu Xie abdicated the throne on the yimao day of the 10th month of the 1st year of the Yankang era of his reign. This corresponds to 25 Nov 220 in the Julian calendar. The Zizhi Tongjian recorded that while Liu Xie did abdicate on the yimao day of the 10th month, Cao Pi only ascended the throne on the xinwei day of the same month (16 days later), which corresponds to 11 Dec 220 on the Julian calendar.) (Note: In his Zizhi Tongjian Kaoyi, Sima Guang noted that Cao Pi's biography in Records of the Three Kingdoms recorded that Emperor Xian abdicated on the bingwu day (16 Nov 220 in the Julian calendar), while Cao Pi ascended the throne on the gengwu day (10 Dec 220). Yuan Hong's Annals of the Later Han also recorded that Cao Pi ascended the throne on the gengwu day. The Xiandi Ji recorded that Emperor Xian abdicated on the yimao day, while Cao Pi ascended the throne on the 29th day of that month (which was the xinwei day). A stele recording the events surrounding the abdication/accession survived till Sima Guang's time; said stele recorded that Emperor Xian abdicated on the xinwei day. Thus, Sima concluded that the records found in Records and Annals were erroneous.)
- Predecessor: Emperor Shao
- Regent: Dong Zhuo Wang Yun Li Jue and Guo Si Cao Cao Cao Pi

Duke of Shanyang (山陽公)
- Tenure: 13 December 220 – 21 April 234
- Successor: Liu Kang (劉康)

Prince of Bohai (渤海王)
- Tenure: 189

Prince of Chenliu (陳留王)
- Tenure: 189
- Born: 2 April 181; Luoyang, Eastern Han
- Died: 21 April 234 (aged 53) (Note: Cao Rui's biography in the Sanguozhi recorded that the Duke of Shanyang died on the gengyin day of the 3rd month of the 2nd year of the Qinglong era of Cao Rui's reign. This date corresponds to 21 April 234 in the Gregorian calendar.); Henei Commandery, Cao Wei
- Consorts: Empress Fu; Consort Dong; Empress Xianmu; Consort Cao (Xian); Consort Cao (Hua); Consort Song
- Issue: unnamed eldest son Liu Feng, Prince of Nanyang; Liu Xi, Prince of Jiyin; Liu Yi, Prince of Shanyang; Liu Mao, Prince of Jibei; Liu Dun, Prince of Donghai two other sons two other daughters Princess Changle
Names
- Family name: Liu (劉); Given name: Xie (協); Courtesy name: Bohe (伯和)
Posthumous name
- Emperor Xiaoxian (孝獻皇帝) (conferred by Cao Wei); Emperor Xiaomin (孝愍皇帝) (conferred by Shu Han)
- House: Liu
- Dynasty: Han (Eastern Han)
- Father: Emperor Ling
- Mother: Empress Linghuai

Emperor Xian of Han
- Traditional Chinese: 漢獻帝
- Simplified Chinese: 汉献帝
Transcriptions
Standard Mandarin
- Hanyu Pinyin: Hàn Xiàndì
- Wade–Giles: Han Hsien-ti

Emperor Xian of Han (2 April 181 – 21 April 234), personal name Liu Xie (劉協), courtesy name Bohe, was the 30th and last emperor of the Han dynasty. He was also the 14th emperor of the Eastern Han dynasty of China. He reigned from 28 September 189 until his abdication and subsequent end of the dynasty on 11 December 220.

Liu Xie was a son of Liu Hong (Emperor Ling) and was a younger half-brother of his predecessor, Liu Bian (Emperor Shao). In 189, at the age of eight, he became emperor after the warlord Dong Zhuo, who had seized control of the Han central government, deposed Emperor Shao and replaced him with Liu Xie. The newly enthroned Liu Xie, historically known as Emperor Xian, was in fact a puppet ruler under Dong Zhuo's control. In 190, when a coalition of regional warlords launched a punitive campaign against Dong Zhuo in the name of freeing Emperor Xian, Dong Zhuo ordered the destruction of the imperial capital, Luoyang, and forcefully relocated the imperial capital along with its residents to Chang'an. After Dong Zhuo's assassination in 192, Emperor Xian fell under the control of Li Jue and Guo Si, two former subordinates of Dong Zhuo. The various regional warlords formally acknowledged Emperor Xian's legitimacy but never took action to save him from being held hostage.

In 195, Emperor Xian managed to escape from Chang'an and return to the ruins of Luoyang during a feud between Li Jue and Guo Si, where he soon became stranded. A year later, the warlord Cao Cao led his forces into Luoyang, received Emperor Xian, took him under his protection, and escorted him to Xu, where the new imperial capital was established. Although Cao Cao paid nominal allegiance to Emperor Xian, he was actually the de facto head of the central government. He skillfully used Emperor Xian as a "trump card" to bolster his legitimacy when he attacked and eliminated rival warlords in his quest to reunify the Han Empire under the central government's rule. Cao Cao's success seemed inevitable until the winter of 208–209, when he lost the decisive Battle of Red Cliffs against the southern warlords Sun Quan and Liu Bei. The battle paved the way for the subsequent emergence of the Three Kingdoms of Wei, Shu, and Wu.

In late 220, some months after Cao Cao's death, Cao Cao's successor, Cao Pi, forced Emperor Xian to abdicate the throne to him. He then established the state of Cao Wei with himself as the new emperor – an event marking the formal end of the Han dynasty and the beginning of the Three Kingdoms period in China. The dethroned Emperor Xian received the noble title Duke of Shanyang (Chinese: 山陽公) from Cao Pi and spent the rest of his life in comfort and enjoyed preferential treatment. He died on 21 April 234, about 14 years after the fall of the Han dynasty.

== Family background ==
Liu Xie was born in 181 to Emperor Ling and his Consort Wang Rong (王荣). (Note: Lady Wang's name is found in vol.27 of the Houhanji (後漢紀) by Yuan Hong.) During her pregnancy, Consort Wang, fearful of Emperor Ling's Empress He, had taken drugs that were intended to induce an abortion, but was not successful in her attempt. Soon after she gave birth to Liu Xie, the jealous Empress He poisoned her, putting poison in her food. Emperor Ling was enraged and wanted to depose her, but the eunuchs pleaded on her behalf, and she was not deposed. Liu Xie was raised personally by Emperor Ling's mother Empress Dowager Dong and known by the circumspect title "Marquis Dong". (Note: This is due to superstition; Emperor Ling had lost a number of sons previously, and therefore both Liu Xie and his elder half-brother Liu Bian were known by such titles; Liu Bian, having been raised by Shi Zimiao (史子眇), was known as "Marquis Shi".) Liu Bian was born of the empress and was older, but Emperor Ling viewed his behaviour as being insufficiently solemn and therefore considered appointing Liu Xie as his crown prince, but hesitated and could not decide.

When Emperor Ling died in 189, an influential eunuch official whom he trusted, Jian Shuo, wanted to first kill Empress He's brother, General-in-Chief He Jin, and then install Liu Xie on the throne, and therefore set up a trap at a meeting he was to have with He Jin. He Jin found out, and preemptively declared Liu Bian the new emperor. Later that year, Emperor Shao granted Liu Xie the title "Prince of Bohai" (渤海王) and later changed his title to "Prince of Chenliu" (陳留王).

== Accession to the throne and collapse of the Han dynasty ==
=== Rise of Dong Zhuo ===
After Liu Bian became emperor, He Jin became the most powerful official in the imperial court, and he and his advisor Yuan Shao quickly entered into a conspiracy to exterminate the eunuchs. They were, however, rebuffed by Empress Dowager He, and they hatched the plan to secretly order a number of warlords to advance on the capital Luoyang to force Empress Dowager He to agree to their demands. One of these warlords was Dong Zhuo, who saw this as an opportunity to control the central government.

He Jin's plan was discovered by the eunuchs, who laid a trap for him and killed him. Yuan Shao then led his forces into the palace and killed the majority of the eunuchs. The remaining eunuchs initially took the young emperor and Liu Xie hostage, but were eventually forced to commit suicide when the battle turned against them. When Dong Zhuo then arrived on scene, he, impressed with his own power and unimpressed with the nervous Emperor Shao, forced the young emperor to yield the throne to Liu Xie (Note: partly because Xie was raised by Empress Dowager Dong who, while not related to Dong Zhuo, was nevertheless still respected by Dong), who then ascended the throne as Emperor Xian. Dong Zhuo then murdered Empress Dowager He and the former Emperor Shao, and became firmly in control of the political scene.

=== Forced relocation west and the death of Dong Zhuo ===
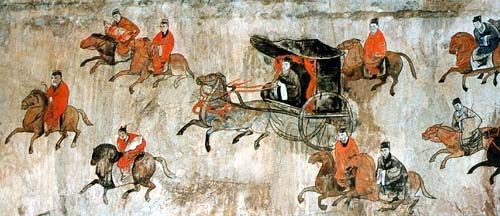
Chariots and cavalry, detail of a mural from the Dahuting Tomb (打虎亭漢墓) of the late Eastern Han dynasty, located in Zhengzhou, Henan.

In the spring of 190, a number of local officials, loosely forming a coalition led by Yuan Shao, quickly rose up against Dong Zhuo. Even though they still feared Dong Zhuo's military power and did not directly advance on Luoyang, Dong Zhuo was also fearful of their collective strength, and therefore determined to move the capital west to the old Han capital Chang'an, closer to his power base in Liang Province (涼州; covering present-day Gansu). On 9 April 190, he forced Emperor Xian to relocate to Chang'an and set fire to Luoyang, leaving it largely in ruins.

After the revolting coalition collapsed, a number of officials, led by Wang Yun and Lü Bu, assassinated Dong on 22 May 192. For a while, it appeared that the Han regime might return to normal, as Wang Yun quickly established relatively friendly relations with the local officials resisting Dong but by this time acting more as local warlords. However, due to Wang Yun's failure to pacify Dong Zhuo's former subordinates, they rose in revolt and killed Wang.

=== Return to Luoyang's ruins ===
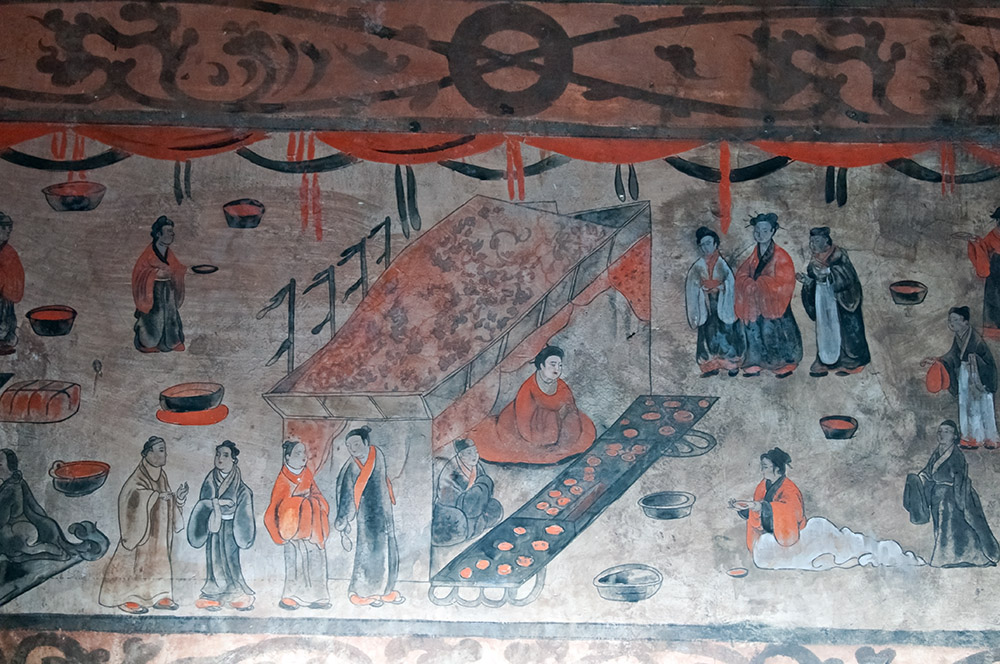
Detail of a banquet scene, mural from the Dahuting Tomb (打虎亭漢墓) of the late Eastern Han dynasty, located in Zhengzhou, Henan.

Dong Zhuo's former subordinates, led by Li Jue and Guo Si, took Emperor Xian and the imperial court under their control. However, Li Jue and Guo Si did not have serious ambitions, and their incompetence in governance furthered the breakdown of the Han Empire into warlord regimes. In 195, Li Jue and Guo Si had a major fallout, and Li took Emperor Xian hostage while Guo took the officials hostage as they battled. Later in the year, after peace talks between Li Jue and Guo Si, they agreed to allow Emperor Xian to return to Luoyang, but as soon as Emperor Xian departed Chang'an, they regretted their decision and chased him with their troops. While they were never able to capture him, Emperor Xian's court was rendered poor and unable to fend for itself, and once it returned to Luoyang, it lacked even the basic essentials of life. Many officials starved to death. At this time, Yuan Shao's strategist Ju Shou suggested that he welcome Emperor Xian to his base in Ji Province so that he could effectively be in control of the central government, but the other strategists Guo Tu and Chunyu Qiong opposed – under the faulty logic that if he did, he would have to yield to Emperor Xian on key decisions. Yuan Shao listened to Guo Tu and Chunyu Qiong and never again considered welcoming Emperor Xian.

=== Tight control by Cao Cao ===
What Yuan Shao would not do, Cao Cao did. Cao Cao was at this time a relatively minor warlord, as the governor of Yan Province (covering present-day western Shandong and eastern Henan), with his headquarters at Xu (present-day Xuchang, Henan). He saw the strategic advantage in having the emperor under his control and protection, and in 196 he marched west to Luoyang and, after securing an agreement with Emperor Xian's generals Dong Cheng and Yang Feng, convincing them of his loyalty, he entered Luoyang and technically shared power with Dong and Yang, but was in fact in command.

Unlike the situation with Dong Zhuo, though, Cao Cao knew how to assuage the other generals and nobles, and while he gave them little power, he made sure that they remained honoured, so minimal opposition against him developed at the imperial court. He then moved the capital to Xu to affirm his control over the central government, and when Yang Feng opposed him, he defeated Yang in c.November 196, and was able to move the capital.

Cao Cao then began to issue imperial edicts in Emperor Xian's name – including a harshly-worded edict condemning Yuan Shao for taking over nearby provinces – even though it still bestowed Yuan with the highly honorific post of Grand Commandant. Cao Cao and Emperor Xian maintained a superficially cordial relationship, but this did not prevent two major confrontations involving Cao and other court officials.

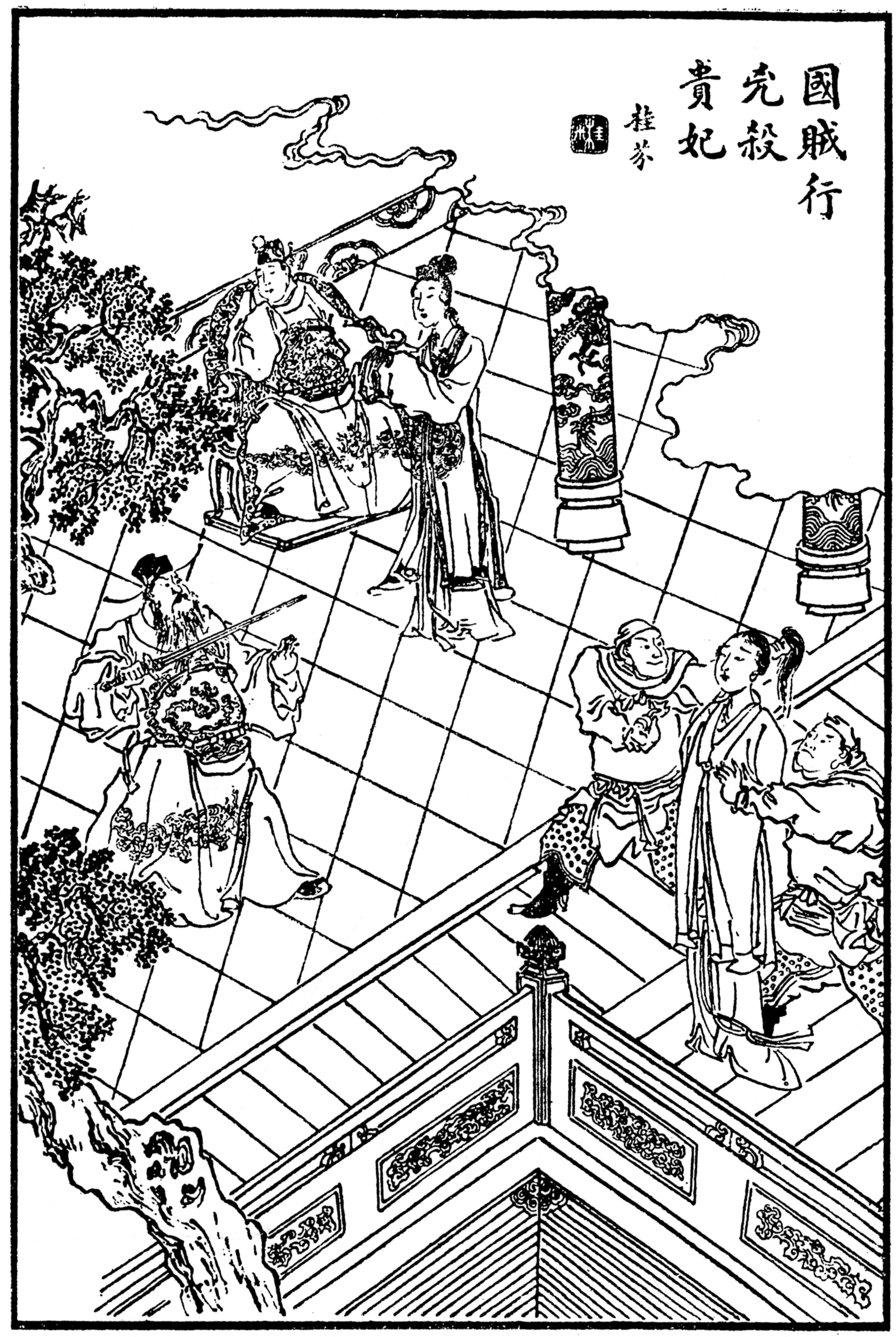
The arrest of Consort Dong with Emperor Xian helpless in the background, from a Qing dynasty illustration of the historical novel Romance of the Three Kingdoms.

In early 199, as Cao Cao was facing a major military confrontation against Yuan Shao, Dong Cheng claimed to have received a secret edict issued by Emperor Xian (hidden in a belt), and he entered into a conspiracy with Liu Bei, Zhong Ji (种輯) and Wang Fu (王服) to assassinate Cao Cao. Late in 199, Liu Bei started a rebellion and waited for Dong Cheng to act in the capital, but in 200, Dong's conspiracy was discovered, and he, along with Zhong Ji and Wang Fu, were killed. Liu Bei was later defeated by Cao Cao and forced to flee to Yuan Shao's territory. Dong Cheng's daughter, an imperial consort, was pregnant, and Emperor Xian personally tried to intercede for her, but Cao Cao had her executed anyway.

Emperor Xian's empress, Empress Fu Shou, angry and fearful about how Consort Dong died, wrote her father, Fu Wan (伏完), a letter accusing Cao Cao of cruelty, and implicitly asking her father to start a new conspiracy against Cao. Fu Wan was fearful of Cao Cao and never acted on the letter, which was discovered in 214. Cao Cao was angry and forced Emperor Xian to have Empress Fu deposed. Emperor Xian was hesitant, and Cao Cao sent his soldiers into the palace to put pressure on the emperor. Empress Fu hid inside the walls, but was finally discovered and dragged out. As she was led away, she cried out to Emperor Xian for him to save her life, but his only response was that he could not even know what would happen to him. She was killed, along with her two sons (Note: A son, Liu Feng, had predeceased his mother on 9 August 200 (renwu day of the 7th month of Jian'an 5, per vol.63 of the Zizhi Tongjian)) and family on 8 January 215. (Note: According to Liu Xie's biography in Book of the Later Han, Empress Fu was executed on the dingmao day of the 11th month of Jian'an 10, corresponding to 8 Jan 215 in the Julian calendar.) On 6 March 215, (Note: According to Liu Xie's biography in Book of the Later Han, Lady Cao was made empress on the jiazi day of the 1st month of Jian'an 20. This corresponds to 6 Mar 215 in the Julian calendar.) Cao Cao forced Emperor Xian to instate his daughter Cao Jie, then an imperial consort, as the new empress.

== Abdication and death ==
Cao Cao died on 15 March 220. His son and successor, Cao Pi, soon forced Emperor Xian to abdicate the throne in favour of himself, ending the Han dynasty. Cao Pi established a new state known as Cao Wei, and he granted Emperor Xian a noble title – Duke of Shanyang (山陽公), and gave him a fiefdom of 10 000 households, with Zhuolucheng (浊鹿城) as the capital. Liu Xie was also ranked above vassal princes, didn't have to refer to himself as a subject while speaking to the emperor and didn't have to kneel when receiving edicts. The former emperor died in April 234 and was buried with honours befitting an emperor, using Han ceremonies, and the then emperor of Wei, Cao Rui, was one of the mourners. As Emperor Xian's crown prince was already dead, his grandson Liu Kang (劉康) inherited his dukedom, which lasted for 73 more years and two more dukes, Liu Jin (劉瑾) and Liu Qiu (劉秋). Liu Qiu died in June or July 307, (Note: 5th month of the 1st year of the Yongjia era, per the annals of Emperor Huai in Book of Jin; the month corresponds to 17 Jun to 16 Jul 307 in the Julian calendar.) during the rebellion led by Ji Sang and Shi Le. This practice of an emperor conferring hereditary nobility on his predecessor, from whom he usurped the throne, was known as "two crownings and three respects".

== Era names ==
- 189: Yonghan (永汉; 永漢; Yǒnghàn)
- 190–193: Chuping (初平; Chūpíng)
- 194–195: Xingping (兴平; 興平; Xīngpíng)
- 196–220: Jian'an (建安; Jiàn'ān)
- 220: Yankang (延康; Yánkāng)

== Family ==
- Empress, of the Fu clan (皇后 伏氏; d. 215), personal name Shou (壽)
  - Liu Feng, Prince of Nanyang (南陽王 劉馮; d. 9 August 200 (Note: According to Zizhi Tongjian, Liu Feng died on the renwu day of the 7th month of Jian'an 5. This corresponds to 9 Aug 200 on the proleptic Gregorian calendar.))
  - Two other sons (d. 215)
- Empress Xianmu, of the Cao clan (獻穆皇后 曹氏; 197–260), personal name Jie (節)
  - Princess Changle (長樂公主), personal name Man (曼)
- Guiren, of the Dong clan (董貴人; d. 200)
  - unborn child (d.200)
- Guiren, of the Cao clan (曹貴人), personal name Xian (憲)
- Guiren, of the Cao clan (曹貴人), personal name Hua (華)
- Guiren, of the Song clan (宋貴人), personal name Dou (都)
- Unknown
  - Unnamed eldest son
  - Liu Xi, Prince of Jiyin (濟陰王 劉熙)
  - Liu Yi, Prince of Shanyang (山陽王 劉懿)
  - Liu Mao, Prince of Jibei (濟北王 劉貌)
  - Liu Dun, Prince of Donghai (東海王 劉敦)
  - Two other daughters, both married Cao Pi (187–226)

== See also ==
- Chinese emperors family tree (early)#Han dynasty, Xin dynasty and Shu Han
- Lists of people of the Three Kingdoms

Emperor Xian of Han House of Liu Born: 2 April 181 Died: 21 April 234
Regnal titles
Preceded by Liu Bian	Emperor of China; Eastern Han; 189–220 with Dong Zhuo (189–192); Li Jue (192–196); Cao Cao (196–220); Cao Pi (220)	Succeeded by Liu Bei
Preceded by Liu Bian	Emperor of China; Eastern Han; 189–220 with Dong Zhuo (189–192); Li Jue (192–196); Cao Cao (196–220); Cao Pi (220)	Succeeded by Cao Pi
Preceded by Liu Bian	Emperor of China; Eastern Han; 189–220 with Dong Zhuo (189–192); Li Jue (192–196); Cao Cao (196–220); Cao Pi (220)	Succeeded by Sun Quan
Royal titles
Vacant Last known title holder: Liu Jing	Duke of Shanyang; 220–234	Succeeded by Liu Kang
