= Emperor Ling of Han =

Emperor of the Han dynasty from 168 to 189

Emperor Ling of Han 漢靈帝
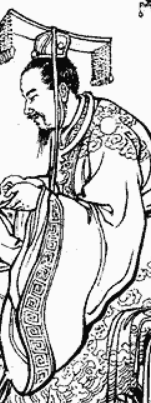
- Illustration from the 1957 Chinese Lianhuanhua adaptation of Romance of the Three Kingdoms

Emperor of the Han dynasty
- Reign: 17 February 168 – 13 May 189
- Predecessor: Emperor Huan
- Successor: Emperor Shao

Marquis of Jiedu Village (解瀆亭侯)
- Tenure: ? – Feb 168
- Predecessor: Liu Chang
- Born: 156
- Died: May 13, 189 (aged 32–33)
- Consorts: Empress Song; Empress Lingsi; Empress Linghuai
- Issue: Emperor Shao; Emperor Xian; Princess Wannian
Full name
- Family name: Liu (劉); Given name: Hong (宏)
Era dates
- Jianning (建寧) 168–172; Xiping (熹平) 172–178; Guanghe (光和) 178–184; Zhongping (中平) 184–189
Posthumous name
- Emperor Xiaoling (孝靈皇帝)
- Dynasty: Han dynasty
- Father: Liu Chang
- Mother: Empress Xiaoren

Emperor Ling of Han
- Traditional Chinese: 漢靈帝
- Simplified Chinese: 汉灵帝
Transcriptions
Standard Mandarin
- Hanyu Pinyin: Hàn Língdì
- Wade–Giles: Han Ling-ti

Liu Hong
- Traditional Chinese: 劉宏
- Simplified Chinese: 刘宏
Transcriptions
Standard Mandarin
- Hanyu Pinyin: Liú Hóng
- Wade–Giles: Liu Hung

Emperor Ling of Han (156/157 – 13 May 189 (Note: According to Liu Hong's biography in Book of the Later Han, he died aged 34 (by East Asian reckoning) on the bingchen day of the 4th month of the 6th year of the Zhongping era of his reign. This corresponds to 13 May 189 on the proleptic Gregorian calendar. By calculation, his birth year should be 156.)), personal name Liu Hong, was the 28th emperor of the Han dynasty and the 12th emperor of the Eastern Han dynasty. He was also the last Eastern Han emperor to exercise effective power during his reign. Born the son of a lesser marquis who descended directly from Emperor Zhang (the third Eastern Han emperor), Liu Hong was chosen to be emperor in February 168 around age 12 after the death of his predecessor, Emperor Huan, who had no son to succeed him. He reigned for about 21 years until his death in May 189.

Emperor Ling's reign saw another repetition of corrupt eunuchs dominating the eastern Han central government, as was the case during his predecessor's reign. Zhang Rang, the leader of the eunuch faction (十常侍), managed to dominate the political scene after defeating a faction led by Empress Dowager Dou's father, Dou Wu, and the Confucian scholar-official Chen Fan in October 168. After reaching adulthood, Emperor Ling was not interested in state affairs and preferred to indulge in women and a decadent lifestyle. At the same time, corrupt officials in the Han government levied heavy taxes on the peasants. He exacerbated the situation by introducing a practice of selling political offices for money; this practice severely damaged the Han civil service system and led to widespread corruption. Mounting grievances against the Han government led to the outbreak of the peasant-led Yellow Turban Rebellion in early 184.

Emperor Ling's reign left the Eastern Han dynasty weak and on the verge of collapse. After his death, the Han Empire disintegrated in chaos for the subsequent decades as various regional warlords fought for power and dominance. (See End of the Han dynasty.) The Han dynasty ended in late 220 when Emperor Ling's son, Emperor Xian, abdicated his throne – an event leading to the start of the Three Kingdoms period in China.

== Family background and accession to the throne ==
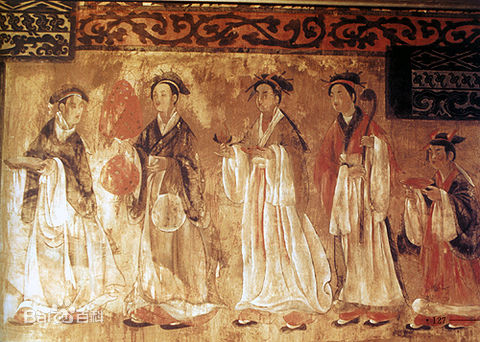
Women dressed in Hanfu silk robes

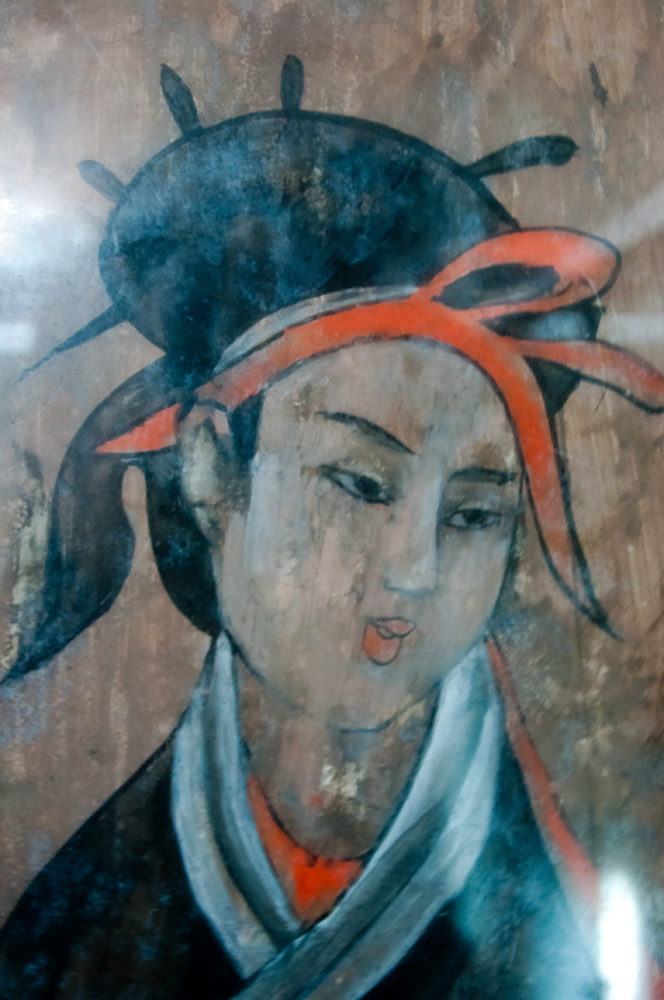
A woman with an Eastern Han hairstyle

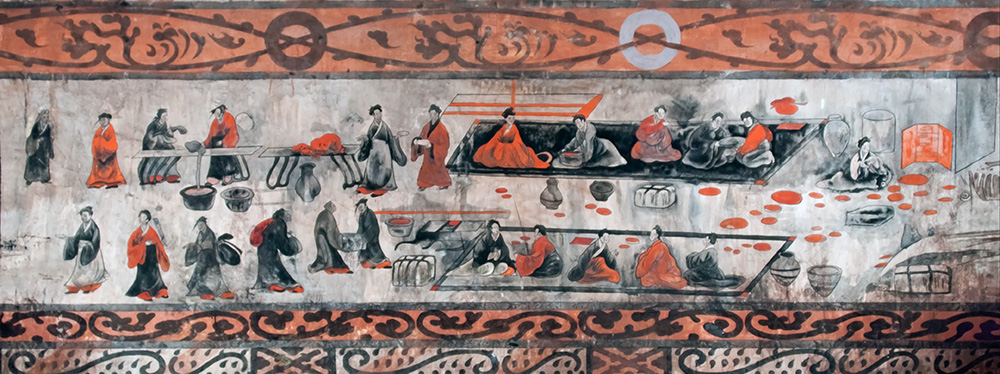
Detail of a banquet scene

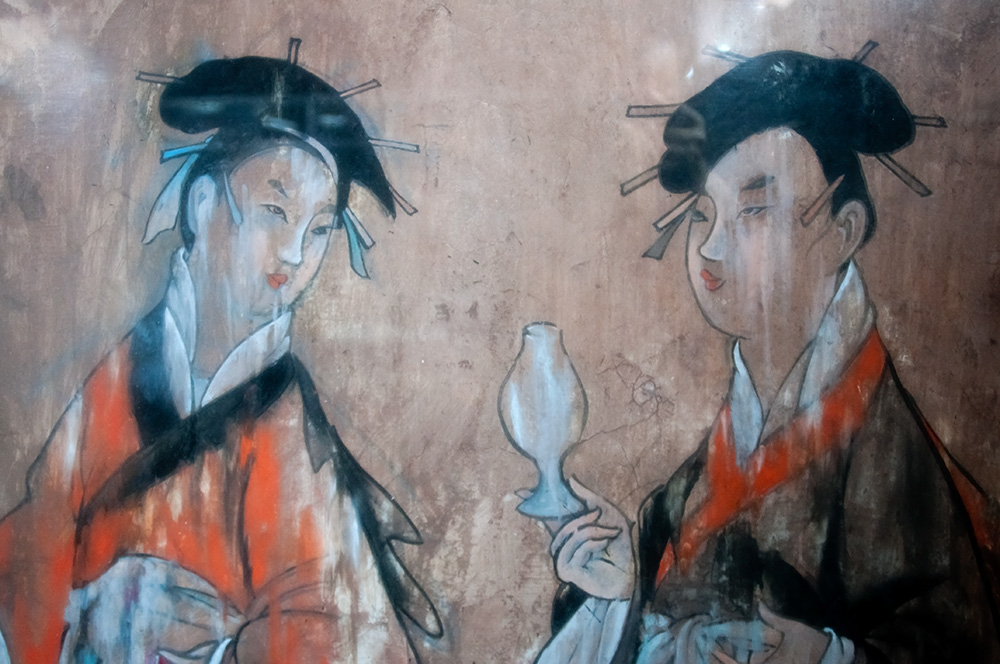
Women dressed in Hanfu robes

Murals of the Dahuting Tomb (Chinese: 打虎亭汉墓, Pinyin: Dahuting Han mu) of the late Eastern Han dynasty (25–220 AD), located in Zhengzhou, Henan province, China, showing scenes of daily life.

Liu Hong was a hereditary marquis – the Marquis of Jiedu Village (解瀆亭侯). In the Han dynasty, a village marquis's marquisate usually comprised only one village or, in rarer cases, two or three villages. He was the third person in his family to hold this title; his father Liu Chang (劉萇) and grandfather Liu Shu (劉淑) were also formerly Marquis of Jiedu Village. His great-grandfather, Liu Kai (劉開), Prince Xiao of Hejian (河間孝王), was the sixth son of Emperor Zhang, the third emperor of the Eastern Han dynasty. His mother, Lady Dong, was Liu Chang's formal spouse.

When Emperor Huan died on 25 January 168 (Note: According to Liu Zhi's biography in Book of the Later Han, he died on the dingchou day of the 12th month of the 1st year of the Yongkang era of his reign. This corresponds to 25 January 168 on the Julian calendar.) without a son to succeed him, his empress, Empress Dou, became empress dowager, and she examined the genealogy of the imperial clan to choose a candidate to be the next emperor. For reasons unknown, her assistant Liu Shu (劉儵) recommended Liu Hong, the Marquis of Jiedu Village. After consulting with her father Dou Wu and the Confucian scholar-official Chen Fan, (Note: According the Zizhi Tongjian, on 30 January 168, Dou Wu was made General-in-Chief while Chen Fan was made Grand Tutor.) Empress Dowager Dou installed a 12-year-old Liu Hong on the throne on 17 February 168, and continued ruling on his behalf as regent. The newly enthroned Emperor Ling bestowed posthumous titles on his grandfather, father and grandmother, honouring them as emperors and an empress respectively. His mother, Lady Dong, did not become empress dowager and instead received the title of an Honoured Lady.

== Early reign ==
Dou Wu and Chen Fan, who became the most important officials in the central government (being the General-in-Chief and Grand Tutor respectively), sought to purge the eunuch faction. Later in 168, they even proposed to exterminate all the powerful eunuchs, a proposal that Empress Dowager Dou rejected. However, word of the plot was leaked, and the eunuchs, after kidnapping the empress dowager and taking the young emperor into custody (after persuading him that it was for his own protection) arrested and executed Chen Fan. Dou Wu resisted but was eventually defeated and forced to commit suicide. The Dou clan was slaughtered. The powerful eunuchs, led by Cao Jie (曹節) and Wang Fu (王甫), became the most powerful individuals in the central government.

After the destruction of the Dou clan, in 169, Emperor Ling promoted his mother to the position of empress dowager, though he continued honouring Empress Dowager Dou, now under house arrest, as empress dowager as well. Members of the Dong clan began to enter government, but did not have substantial influence. Later that year, the eunuchs persuaded Emperor Ling that the "partisans" (i.e., Confucian officials and those who supported them) were plotting against him, and a large number of partisans were arrested and killed; the others had their civil liberties stripped completely, in an event historically known as the second Disaster of Partisan Prohibitions.

Empress Dowager Dou died in 172. Despite suggestions by eunuchs to have her only buried as an imperial consort and not be honoured as Emperor Huan's wife, Emperor Ling had her buried with full honours befitting an empress dowager in Emperor Huan's mausoleum. In the aftermaths of her death, a vandal wrote on the palace gate: "All that is under the heaven is in upheaval. Cao and Wang murdered the empress dowager. The key officials only know how to be officials and had nothing faithful to say."

The angry eunuchs ordered an investigation which led to over 1,000 arrests, but nothing conclusive was found. In that year, the eunuchs also falsely accused Emperor Huan's brother, Liu Kui (劉悝), the Prince of Bohai, of treason and forced him to commit suicide. The members of his entire household, including his wife, concubines, children, assistants and principality officials, were all rounded up and executed. As the Han government became more corrupt, the people received heavier tax burdens. As Emperor Ling grew older, he not only took no remedial action, but continued to tolerate the eunuchs' corruption for the most part. A major defeat of the Han army by the Xianbei tribes in 177 further drained the imperial treasury.

In 178, Emperor Ling's wife Empress Song, whom he made empress in 171 but did not favour, fell victim to the eunuchs' treachery. Her aunt, Lady Song, was Liu Kui's wife, so the eunuchs were worried that she would seek vengeance on them. Thus, by collaborating with other imperial consorts who wanted to replace the empress, the eunuchs falsely accused Empress Song of using witchcraft to curse Emperor Ling. The emperor believed them and deposed the empress, who was imprisoned and died in despair. Her father, Song Feng (宋酆), and the rest of her family were exterminated.

== Middle reign ==
In 178, Emperor Ling introduced the practice of selling political offices for money – a practice which severely damaged the Han civil service system (chajuzhi, Chinese: 察举制) (Note: chajuzhi, also known as "elevation on recommendation", was a civil service system introduced by emperor Wu of Han. Chajuzhi also was the first civil service system in Chinese history. It included two specific parts, recommendation and examination. And it mainly depended on the former.) and led to widespread corruption. The people who paid for these positions perpetuated corruption upon taking office. That was exactly what Emperor Ling had in mind: he allowed the officials to pay by instalments after taking office if they could not afford the initial amount.

In January 181, Emperor Ling instated Lady He as the new empress and appointed her brother, He Jin, as a key official in his government. (According to legends, she managed to enter Emperor Ling's imperial harem because her family bribed the eunuchs in charge of selecting women for the emperor.) She received the position of empress because she bore Emperor Ling a son, Liu Bian; the emperor had other sons but they died prematurely before Liu Bian's birth.

During these years, Emperor Ling became interested in building imperial gardens so he ordered the commandery and principality officials throughout the Han Empire to pay their tributes to him directly, so he could use the money to finance his construction projects. This, in turn, created pressures on the officials to resort to corrupt practices so they could extract a larger tribute from their jurisdictions for the emperor. In spite of all his flaws, Emperor Ling occasionally heeded good advice from his subjects but was not consistent in doing so. His subjects often found it frustrating to try to convince him on policy issues because he only listened to them when he wanted to.

== The Yellow Turban Rebellion ==
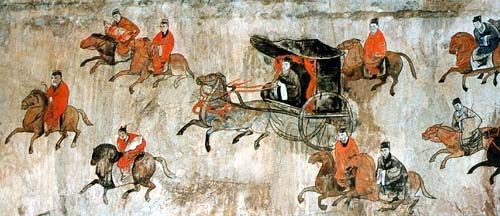
Chariots and cavalry, detail of a mural from the Dahuting Tomb (Chinese: 打虎亭汉墓, Pinyin: Dahuting Han mu) of the late Eastern Han dynasty (25–220 AD), located in Zhengzhou, Henan province, China

Sometime before 183, a major Taoist rebel movement had started in Ji Province – the Taiping Sect (太平教), led by Zhang Jiao, who claimed he had magical powers to heal the sick. By 183, his teachings and followers had spread to eight of the empire's thirteen provinces – Ji, Qing, Xu, You, Jing, Yang, Yan, and Yu. Several key imperial officials became concerned about Zhang Jiao's hold over his followers, and suggested that the Taiping Sect be disbanded. Emperor Ling did not listen to them.

Zhang Jiao had in fact planned a rebellion. He commissioned 36 military commanders, set up a shadow government, and wrote a declaration: "The Azure sky has perished; behold, the Yellow sky will soon rise. When the year is jiazi, there will be prosperity under Heaven!". Zhang Jiao had his supporters write jiazi in large characters with white talc everywhere they could – including on the doors of government offices in the imperial capital and other cities. One of Zhang Jiao's followers, Ma Yuanyi (馬元義), plotted with two eunuchs to start an uprising inside the palace.

Early in 184, this plot was discovered, and Ma Yuanyi was immediately arrested and executed. Emperor Ling ordered that Taiping Sect members be arrested and executed, and Zhang Jiao immediately declared a rebellion. Every member of the rebellion wore a yellow turban or headscarf as their symbol – and therefore the rebellion became known for it. Within a month, Zhang Jiao controlled large areas of territory. Under suggestion by the eunuch Lü Qiang (呂強), who was sympathetic to the partisans, Emperor Ling pardoned the partisans to ward off the possibility they would join the Yellow Turbans. (Lü Qiang himself became a victim, however, when the other eunuchs, in retaliation, falsely accused him of wanting to depose the emperor, and he committed suicide later that year.)

Emperor Ling sent out a number of military commanders against the Yellow Turbans, and in these campaigns several of them distinguished themselves – including Huangfu Song, Cao Cao, Fu Xie (傅燮), Zhu Jun, Lu Zhi, and Dong Zhuo. A key military development with great implications later was that the Yellow Turbans fought mainly with troops deployed from the battle-tested Liang Province who had been accustomed to suppressing rebellions by the Qiang tribes. In late 184, Zhang Jiao was killed, and while the rest of the Yellow Turbans were not defeated immediately, they gradually dissipated by the following year (although several of the minor rebellions would not be put down until 205 AD). Because of the Liang Province forces' contributions to the campaign, they began to be feared and began to look down on troops from all other provinces. During and in the aftermaths of the Yellow Turban Rebellion, many people from other provinces, in order to ward off pillaging by Yellow Turbans or governmental forces, also organised themselves into military groups, and a good number resisted government forces, and even after the Yellow Turbans were defeated, the central government's control of the provinces was no longer what it used to be.

== Late reign ==
Even after the Yellow Turban Rebellion was suppressed, Emperor Ling did not change his wasteful and corrupt ways. He continued to levy heavy taxes and continued to sell offices. As a result, other agrarian and military rebellions multiplied. In 185, when a fire broke out in the southern part of the imperial palace, the Ten Attendants suggested to Emperor Ling to levy a tax of ten maces from every mu of farmland to raise funds for rebuilding the palace. Emperor Ling then ordered the officials in Taiyuan (太原), Hedong (河東) and Didao (狄道) commanderies to transport wood and patterned rocks to Luoyang (the imperial capital) as construction materials. When the shipments reached the palace, the eunuchs who received them scolded the labourers for delivering materials of poor quality, and insisted on paying them far below market prices – to as low as a tenth of the market price. They then resold the materials to other eunuchs, who refused to buy. Over time, the accumulated piles of wood started decaying. The construction works were thus delayed for years. In order to please Emperor Ling, some regional officials levied heavier taxes and forced the people to produce greater quantities of construction materials – this led to greater resentment from the common people.

Emperor Ling appointed cavalry officers to serve as his messengers whenever he issued orders for things to be delivered to Luoyang. These officers, known as zhongshi (中使; "central emissaries"), abused their power by forcing the regional officials, who were afraid of them, to give them bribes. The appointment of officials below the position of Inspector (刺史) was decided by the amount of money they could pay to fund the army and palace construction. Before assuming office, these officials had to undergo an assessment to determine their "value". Some who could not afford the required amount committed suicide, while others who refused to take up their appointments were forced into accepting.

Around the time, there was one Sima Zhi (司馬直), who had been newly appointed as the Administrator (太守) of Julu Commandery (鉅鹿郡). As he had a reputation for being an honest official, he was required to pay less – three million maces. Upon receiving the order, he lamented, "I should be like a parent to the common people, but I have been forced to exploit them to satisfy (the Emperor's) needs. I can't bear to do this." He attempted to resign, claiming that he was ill, but his request was denied. When he reached Meng Ford (孟津) near Luoyang, he wrote a memorial to point out all the problems with the government and cite historical examples to warn the emperor. He then committed suicide by consuming poison. After reading Sima Zhi's memorial, Emperor Ling temporarily stopped collecting funds for rebuilding the palace, but quickly resumed his construction projects later. He built a hall within the western gardens and filled it with treasures and silk taken from the agriculture department. He also visited his birthplace in Hejian Commandery, where he acquired land and used it to build mansions and towers. As Emperor Ling came from a relatively poor background as a lesser marquis, he had a strong desire to accumulate as much personal wealth as possible – especially after he saw that his predecessor, Emperor Huan, did not leave behind a large family fortune for him. He drew his wealth not just from the imperial treasuries, but also from the low-ranking eunuchs who attended to him.

Emperor Ling often said, "Regular Attendant Zhang (Rang) is my father, Regular Attendant Zhao (Zhong) is my mother." As the eunuchs were highly trusted and favoured by Emperor Ling, they behaved lawlessly and abused their power. They even built lavish mansions for themselves in the same design as the imperial palace. When Emperor Ling once visited Yong'anhou Platform (永安侯臺), a high viewing platform, the eunuchs were worried that he would see their mansions and become suspicious. Thus, they told him, "Your Majesty shouldn't put yourself on higher ground. If you do so, the people will scatter." The emperor believed them and stopped visiting high towers and viewing platforms.

In 186, Emperor Ling tasked the eunuchs Song Dian (宋典) and Bi Lan (畢嵐) with overseeing new construction projects, including a new palace hall, four large bronze statues, four giant bronze bells and water-spouting animal sculptures, among others. He also ordered coins to be minted and widely circulated. Many people perceived this to be a display of the emperor's extravagance, and pointed to signs showing that the coins will eventually scatter everywhere. This turned out to be true when chaos broke out in Luoyang after Emperor Ling's death. Emperor Ling appointed Zhao Zhong as "General of Chariots of Cavalry" (車騎將軍) but removed him from office after some 100 days.

In 188, under the suggestions of Liu Yan, Emperor Ling greatly increased the political and military power of the provincial governors and selected key officials to serve as provincial governors.

In 189, as Emperor Ling became critically ill, a succession issue came into being. Emperor Ling had two surviving sons – Liu Bian, the son of Empress He, and Liu Xie, the son of Consort Wang. Because Emperor Ling had, earlier in his life, frequently lost sons in childhood, he later believed that his sons needed to be raised outside the palace by foster parents. Therefore, when Liu Bian was born, he was entrusted to Shi Zimiao (史子眇), a Taoist, and referred to "Marquis Shi." Later, when Liu Xie was born, he was raised by Emperor Ling's mother, Empress Dowager Dong, and was known as "Marquis Dong." Liu Bian was born of the empress and was older, but Emperor Ling viewed his behaviour as being insufficiently solemn and therefore considered making Liu Xie crown prince, but hesitated and could not decide.

Upon Emperor Ling's death on May 13 of that year, Jian Shuo, fearful that Liu Bian would expose the eunuchs' corruption, set up a trap: He would call a meeting between him and General-in-Chief He Jin (何進), during which he would have He Jin killed and have Liu Xie installed as Emperor. He Jin easily saw through the plot and preemptively had Liu Bian installed as Emperor. Jian Shuo was later tried and executed via dismemberment.

== Family ==
- Empress Song, of the Song clan (皇后 宋氏; d. 178)
- Empress Lingsi, of the He clan (靈思皇后 何氏; d. 189)
  - Liu Bian, Prince Huai of Hongnong (弘農懷王 劉辯; 176–190), first son
- Empress Linghuai, of the Wang clan (靈懷皇后 王氏; d. 181), personal name Rong (榮)
  - Liu Xie, Emperor Xiaoxian (孝獻皇帝 劉協; 181–234), second son
- Unknown
  - Princess Wannian (萬年公主), first daughter

== See also ==
- Chinese emperors family tree (early)#Han dynasty, Xin dynasty and Shu Han
- Consort kin
- Lists of people of the Three Kingdoms

== Explanatory notes ==
Emperor Ling of Han House of Liu Born: 156 Died: 13 May 189
Regnal titles
Preceded by Emperor Huan of Han	Emperor of China; Eastern Han; 168–189 with Empress Dowager Dou (168–172)	Succeeded by Emperor Shao of Han
