= List of township-level divisions of Yunnan =

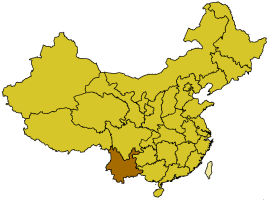
Location of Yunnan in China

This is a list of township-level divisions of the province of Yunnan, in the southwest of the People's Republic of China (PRC). After province, prefecture, and county-level divisions, township-level divisions constitute the formal fourth-level administrative divisions of the PRC. The types of townships in Yunnan include subdistricts, ethnic townships, and towns.

== B ==
- Bajie Subdistrict
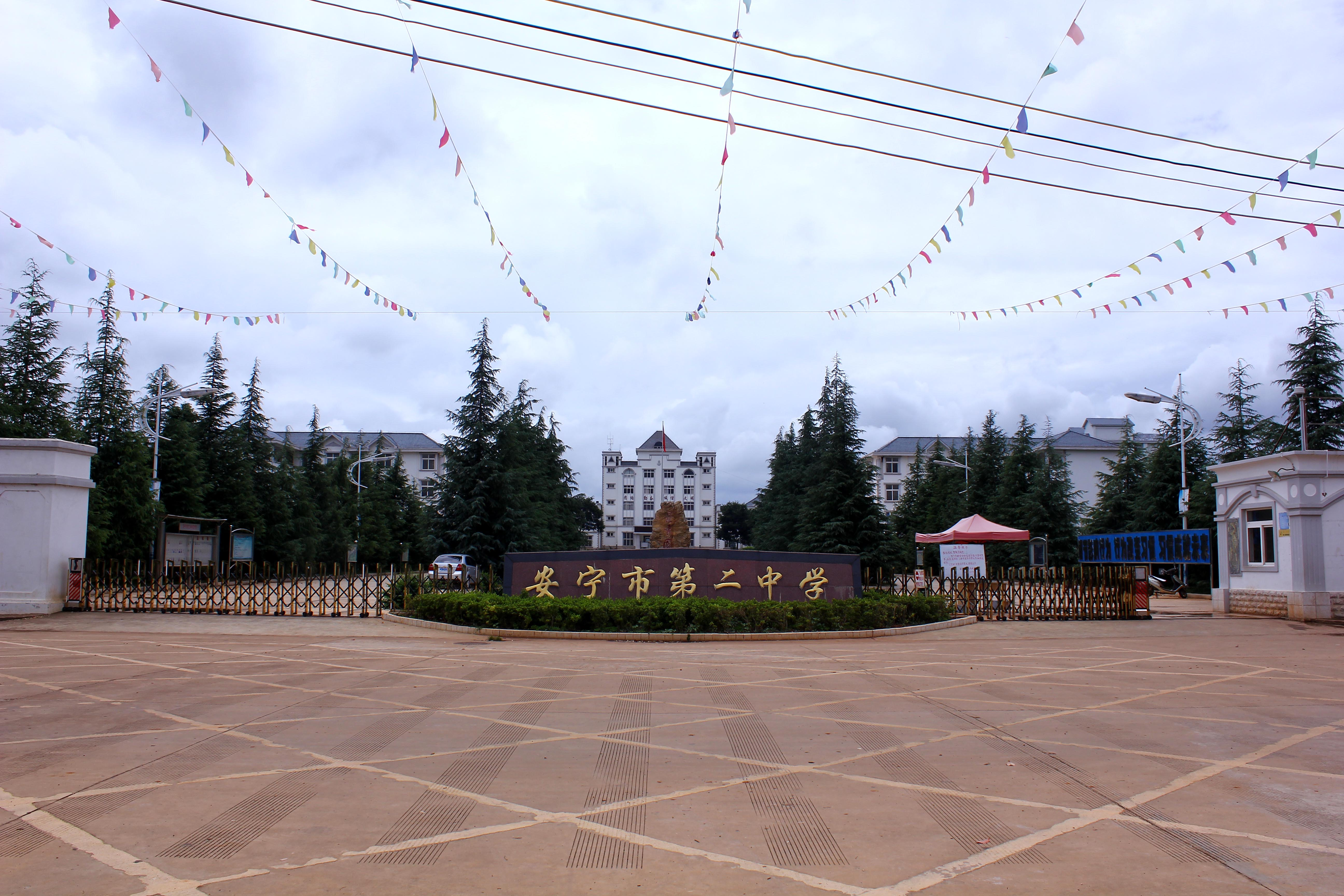
  Bajie Subdistrict, Yunnan

== C ==
- Caopu Subdistrict

== D ==
- Dajie, Jiangchuan County
- Daqiao Township, Huize County
- Daqiao Township, Shiping County

== H ==
- Hongqiao Subdistrict, Xuanwei
- Hongqiao Township, Yunnan
- Huaxi, Yunnan

== J ==
- Jiantang
- Jinfang Subdistrict
- Jiucheng Township, Yunnan
- Jiucheng, Honghe
- Jiucheng, Weixin County
- Jiucheng, Yingjiang County

== K ==
- Kunyang Subdistrict

== L ==
- Lajing Town
- Lianran Subdistrict
- Liqi Subdistrict
- Lubiao Subdistrict
- Lucheng, Yunnan
- Luoji Township, Shangri-La
- Luokan, Yunnan

== M ==
- Manhao
- Mohan, Yunnan

== Q ==
- Qionglong Subdistrict, Anning, Yunnan

== S ==
- Shangguan, Dali
- Shijie Yi Ethnic Township
- Shuangjiang, Eshan County

== T ==
- Taiping New City Subdistrict

== W ==
- Wenquan Subdistrict, Anning, Yunnan
- Wenquan Township, Yunnan

== X ==
- Xiaguan, Dali City
- Xiangyang Township, Yunnan
- Xianjie Subdistrict
- Xichuan Township
- Xinhua Township, Pingbian County
- Xinhua Township, Tengchong County
- Xinhua Township, Yuanmou County
- Xinhua Yi and Miao Ethnic Township
- Xinhua, Wenshan
- Xinqiao, Yunnan

== Y ==
- Yingpan, Lanping County
- Yuezhou Town
