= Xinhua Township =

Xinhua Township may refer to:

- Xinhua Township, Anhui, in Huangshan District, Huangshan City
- Xinhua Township, Chongqing, in Qianjiang District
- Xinhua Township, Gansu, in Liangzhou District, Wuwei
- Xinhua Township, Guangxi, in Fuchuan Yao Autonomous County
- Xinhua Township, Guizhou, in Liuzhi Special District, Liupanshui
- Xinhua Township, Heilongjiang, in Beilin District, Suihua
- Xinhua Township, Ningnan County, Sichuan
- Xinhua Township, Tianquan County, Sichuan
- Xinhua Township, Pingbian County, in Pingbian Miao Autonomous County, Yunnan
- Xinhua Township, Tengchong County, Yunnan
- Xinhua Township, Yuanmou County, Yunnan
- Xinhua Yi and Miao Ethnic Township, Fengqing County, Yunnan
