= Xinhua (disambiguation) =

Xinhua (Chinese: t 新華, s 新华; literal Chinese translation: "New China") is an official news agency of the People's Republic of China.

Xinhua may also refer to:

- "New China" (Chinese: t 新華, s 新华, p Xīnhuá, 新化, w Hsin-hua):
  - Republic of China (1912–1949) (rarely used), as opposed to Imperial China prior to the Xinhai Revolution
  - People's Republic of China (Chinese: 新中国), as opposed to the Imperial and Nationalist China prior to the success of the Chinese Communist Revolution, which is typically referred to as "Old China" (Chinese: 旧中国)
  - The present Republic of China on Taiwan

== Places ==
=== Mainland China ===
- Xinhua, Linze County, Gansu
- Xinhua, Hegang, in Dongshan District, Hegang, Heilongjiang
- Xinhua, Shennongjia, Hubei
- Xinhua, Tongyu County, Jilin
- Xinhua, Xuanhan County, Sichuan
- Xinhua, Wenshan, in Funing County, Yunnan
- Xinhua County (新化县), Loudi, Hunan
- Xinhua District (disambiguation)
- Xinhua Gate, a main gate of Zhongnanhai in Beijing
- Xinhua Town, Bayannur, in Linhe District, Bayannur, Inner Mongolia
- Xinhua Subdistrict (disambiguation)
- Xinhua Township (disambiguation)

=== Taiwan ===
- Xinhua District, Tainan (新化區)

== Others ==
- China Xinhua Airlines, based in Beijing
- China Xinhua News Network Corporation, a TV news channel owned by the Xinhua News Agency
- Xinhua Bookstore, a major bookstore chain in China
- Xinhua Daily, a newspaper in Jiangsu province
- Xinhua Film Company, a Shanghai film company active in the 1930s and 40s
- Xinhua Holdings, a financial news company based in Hong Kong
  - Xinhua Sports & Entertainment, a media group based in Beijing, subsidiary of Xinhua Holdings
- Xinhua Zidian, a Chinese-language dictionary published by the Commercial Press
- SS Xinhua, a former Chinese merchant ship
- Xin Hua (software)
- Sin Hua Bank (Xinhua Bank)

== See also ==
- Xinghua (disambiguation)
