= Jiucheng =

Jiùchéng (旧城, old city) may refer to the following locations in China:

== Towns ==
- Jiucheng, Anhui, in Lixin County
- Jiucheng, Guangxi, in Pingguo County
- Jiucheng, Guizhou, in Daozhen Gelao and Miao Autonomous County
- Jiucheng, Huanghua, Hebei, in Huanghua
- Jiucheng, Xinji, Hebei
- Jiucheng, Shandong, in Juancheng County
- Jiucheng, Honghe, in Luxi County, Yunnan
- Jiucheng, Weixin County, Yunnan
- Jiucheng, Yingjiang County, Yunnan

== Townships ==
- Jiucheng Township, Hebei, in Qianxi County
- Jiucheng Township, Yunnan, in Shidian County
