= Xinji (disambiguation) =

Xinji may refer to the following locations in China:

- Xinji (辛集市), city in Hebei

== Towns ==
Written as "新集镇":

- Xinji, Fengtai County, Anhui
- Xinji, Wuhe County, Anhui
- Xinji, Yingshang County, Anhui
- Xinji, Linxia County, Gansu
- Xinji, Changli County, Hebei
- Xinji, Sanhe, Hebei
- Xinji, Tangshan, in Qianxi County, Hebei
- Xinji, Xin County, Henan
- Xinji, Yizheng, Jiangsu
- Xinji, Shaanxi, in Nanzheng County

Written as "辛集镇":

- Xinji, Haixing County, Hebei
- Xinji, Xinji, Hebei
- Xinji, Luyi County, Henan
- Xinji, Yinan County, Shandong

== Townships ==
Written as "新集乡":

- Xinji Township, Dingxi, in Anding District, Dingxi, Gansu
- Xinji Township, Zhenyuan County, Gansu
- Xinji Township, Tongbai County, Henan
- Xinji Township, Guannan County, Jiangsu
- Xinji Township, Ningxia, in Pengyang County

Written as "辛集乡":

- Xinji Township, Lushan County, Henan
- Xinji Township, Guan County, Shandong
