= Xiqi language =

Loloish language of Yunnan, China

Xiqi
- Native to: China
- Ethnicity: Yi
- Language family: Sino-Tibetan: Lolo-Burmese; Loloish; Nisoish; Northern Loloish?; (unclassified); Xiqi

Language codes
- ISO 639-3: –

Xiqi (Chinese: 西期; autonym: ɕi33 tɕhi33 pho21) is an unclassified Loloish language of Huaning County, Yunnan, China. It is also called Siqipo 斯期颇 (sɿ55 tɕhi55 pho21) in Mile County.

== Classification ==
Pelkey (2011:431) suggests that the Xiqi, Ati, and Long languages of Huaning County may be Southeastern Loloish languages. Hsiu (2018) suggests a Northern Loloish affiliation.

== Distribution ==
The Huaning County Gazetteer 华宁县志 (1994:514) lists the following locations of Xiqi.

- Tonghongdian Township 通红甸乡: Suomeizao 所梅早村, Dapozuo 大婆左村
- Panxi Township 盘溪乡: Yide 矣得村, Fagao 法高村, Dayaxi 大丫喜村, Longtanying 龙潭营村
- Chengjiao Township 城郊乡: Dengloushan 登楼山, Puchazhai 普茶寨
- Huaxi Township 华溪乡: Xishajing 西沙井村, Dujia 独家村
- Qinglong Township 青龙镇: Shanqi 山歧村, Qize 起则村

== Vocabulary ==
The Huaning County Ethnic Gazetteer (1992:72) provides a short word list of Adu, Ati, Xiqi, Nong, and Azhe transcribed using Chinese characters, shown below. Pinyin transliterations have also been provided below.

English gloss	Chinese gloss	Adu (阿笃语)	Ati (阿梯语)	Xiqi (西期语)	Nong (弄语)	Azhe (阿哲语)
village	寨子	且(qie)	且(qie)	卡(ka)	卡(ka)	卡(ka)
water	水	叶(ye)	叶(ye)	矣咋(yi zha)	翁咋(weng zha)	叶(ye)
girl	小姑娘	燃米诺(ran mi nuo)	尼格莫(ni ge mo)	阿门儿若(a men er ruo)	阿门儿少若(a men er shao ruo)	若麻儿西若(ruo ma er xi ruo)
boy	小伙子	茶塞(cha sai)	差血若(cha(i) xue ruo)	阿杂若(a za ruo)	撮沙若(cuo sha ruo)	若那儿(ruo na er)
corn	包谷	矣白儿(yi bai er)	苏柏儿(su bai er)	阻目(zu mu)	苏木白儿(su mu bai er)	火魔(huo mo)
have	有	杂杂(za za)	杂杂(za za)	白儿(bai er)	杂(za)	祖阿(杂)(zu a (za))
not	无	麻(ma)	麻(ma)	麻(ma)	麻(ma)	阿米(a mi)
