= Xichuan =

Xichuan may refer to these places in China:

- Xichuan County (淅川县), a county in Henan
- Xichuan, Gansu (西川镇), a town in Qin'an County, Gansu
- Xichuan Township (西川乡), a township in Ninglang Yi Autonomous County, Yunnan
- Xichuan Circuit (西川路), a circuit during the late Tang dynasty and early Song dynasty
