= Jianxing =

Jianxing (simplified Chinese: 建兴; traditional Chinese: 建興) may refer to:

== Townships in China ==
- Jianxing Township, Sichuan, in Zitong County, Sichuan
- Jianxing Township, Yunnan, in Xinping Yi and Dai Autonomous County, Yunnan

== Historical eras ==
- Jianxing (223–237), era name used by Liu Shan, emperor of Shu Han
- Jianxing (252–253), era name used by Sun Liang, emperor of Eastern Wu
- Jianxing (313–317), era name used by Emperor Min of Jin, later continued by Former Liang rulers until 361 (except for a brief interruption 354–355)
- Jianxing (386–396), era name used by Murong Chui, emperor of Later Yan
- Jianxing (819–830), or Geonheung, era name used by Seon of Balhae

== People ==
Wei Jianxing, Chisese statesman.
