= Qianying =

Qianying may refer to the following locations in China:

- Qianying, Tangshan (钱营镇), town in Fengnan District, Tangshan, Hebei
- Qianying Township, Hebei (前营乡), in Xinji
- Qianying Township, Henan (前营乡), in Baofeng County
