= COVID-19 pandemic in Hebei =

- Disease: COVID-19
- Pathogen: SARS-CoV-2
- Location: Hebei, China
- First outbreak: Wuhan, Hubei
- Arrival date: 2020
- Confirmed cases: 1,457
- Active cases: 20
- Recovered: 1,430
- Deaths: 7

The COVID-19 pandemic reached the province of Hebei, China.

== Statistics ==
Division	Active	Confirmed	Deceased	Recovered
Hebei	20	1,457	7	1,430
Shijiazhuang	64	1	899	
Tangshan	0	1	58	
Qinhuangdao	0	10	1	9
Handan	0	32	0	32
Xingtai	2	96	1	93
Baoding	2	50	0	48
Zhangjiakou	0	43	0	43
Chengde	0	7	0	7
Cangzhou	0	3	47	
Langfang	0	33	0	33
Hengshui	0	8	0	8
Dingzhou	0	1	0	1
Xinji	75	75	0	0

== Timeline ==
=== 2020 ===
On January 22, Shijiazhuang City, Hebei Province, reported the first confirmed case. Patient Li, male, 72 years old, from Wuhan, came to Shijiazhuang to visit relatives on January 18. The patient was isolated and treated in a designated hospital, and his condition was stable. Six of his close contacts have been isolated for medical observation, and there are no abnormalities such as fever.

On January 23, the Hebei Provincial Health Commission stated that an 80-year-old man surnamed Chen was diagnosed with the new coronavirus. The patient passed away on the 22nd, the first death case outside Hubei.

On January 25, Hebei Province reported six new confirmed cases of pneumonia caused by a new type of coronavirus. Among them: Baoding City and Chengde City each had 1 case, which was the first confirmed case reported; other newly established cases were 3 cases in Shijiazhuang City and 1 case in Cangzhou City.

On January 26, Hebei Province reported five new confirmed cases of pneumonia caused by the new coronavirus, including 2 cases in Handan City, 2 cases in Baoding City, and 1 in Shijiazhuang City. Handan City reported the first confirmed case.

On January 27, Hebei Province reported five new confirmed cases of pneumonia caused by a new coronavirus infection, including 2 cases in Langfang City, 2 cases in Shijiazhuang City, and 1 case in Xingtai City. Langfang City and Xingtai City reported the first confirmed cases.

On January 28, Hebei Province reported 15 new confirmed cases of pneumonia caused by new coronavirus infection, including 4 cases in Langfang City, 3 cases in Cangzhou City, 2 cases in Handan City, 2 cases in Shijiazhuang City, 2 cases in Hengshui City, 1 case in Tangshan City, and 1 case in Xingtai City. Hengshui and Tangshan reported the first confirmed cases.

On January 29, Hebei Province reported 15 new confirmed cases of pneumonia caused by new coronavirus infection, including 3 cases in Baoding City, 3 cases in Cangzhou City, 3 cases in Langfang City, 2 cases in Tangshan City, 1 case in Shijiazhuang City, and 1 case in Hengshui City. 1 point in Zhangjiakou City and 1 point in Xingtai City.

On January 30, Hebei Province reported 17 new confirmed cases of pneumonia caused by the new coronavirus, including 5 cases in Zhangjiakou City, 4 cases in Cangzhou City, 2 cases in Handan City, 2 cases in Xingtai City, 1 case in Shijiazhuang City, and 1 case in Baoding City. There was 1 case in Chengde City and 1 case in Hengshui City.

On January 31, Hebei Province reported 17 new confirmed cases of pneumonia caused by the new coronavirus, including 6 cases in Cangzhou City, 4 cases in Tangshan City, 4 cases in Baoding City, 2 cases in Xingtai City, and 1 case in Handan City.

=== 2021 ===
January 8, 2021 On-site visit to the Shijiazhuang Nucleic Acid Testing Laboratory, the staff work in 24-hour shifts

On January 9, 2021, Li Zhan, director of the Shijiazhuang Ethnic and Religious Affairs Bureau: There is currently no evidence that the source of the epidemic is directly related to religious gatherings

January 10, 2021 Shijiazhuang: Living supplies are guaranteed, and vegetable farmers deliver vegetables to the community

On January 12, 2021, the second round of nucleic acid testing in Shijiazhuang was launched, enabling the information collection system to save time

On January 14, 2021, stranded in Shijiazhuang due to the epidemic, the camera recorded the whole rescue process of the trapped people

On January 15, 2021, Xiaoxin’s Vlog entered the centralized isolation point in Shijiazhuang, and saw "China Speed" here again

On January 2, 1 new case in Hebei Province. Reported by Gaocheng District, Shijiazhuang City. The patient is a 61-year-old woman who attended a wedding on December 28.

On January 3, four new cases were reported in Hebei Province. Among them, 2 cases were reported by Nangong City, and they were brothers. The other two cases were reported in Gaocheng District, Shijiazhuang City.

On January 4, 14 new cases were reported in Hebei Province, 11 cases were reported in Shijiazhuang City (2 cases of asymptomatic infection were converted to confirmed cases), and Xingtai City reported 3 cases (1 case of asymptomatic infection was converted to confirmed cases).

On January 5, 20 new cases were reported in Hebei Province, of which 19 cases were reported in Shijiazhuang City (5 cases were converted from asymptomatic infections to confirmed cases), and 1 case was reported in Xingtai City.

On January 6, 51 new cases were reported in Hebei Province, 50 cases were reported in Shijiazhuang City (2 cases were converted from asymptomatic infections to confirmed cases), and 1 case was reported in Xingtai City (from asymptomatic infections to confirmed cases). There were 69 new cases of local asymptomatic infections and two new imported cases.

On January 7, 33 new cases were reported in Hebei Province, of which 31 cases were reported in Shijiazhuang City (1 case was converted from an asymptomatic infection to a confirmed case), and 2 cases were reported in Xingtai City (1 case was converted from an asymptomatic infection to a confirmed case) ). 39 new cases of local asymptomatic infections were added, including 35 cases in Shijiazhuang City and 4 cases in Xingtai City.

On January 8, 14 new local cases of new coronavirus pneumonia were confirmed in Hebei Province, all of which were reported by Shijiazhuang City. 16 new local asymptomatic infections in Hebei Province, all reported by Shijiazhuang City.

=== 2022 ===
On January 23, two confirmed cases of new coronary pneumonia were found in Anxin County, both related to Beijing. 3 new local confirmed cases of new coronavirus pneumonia on the same day (Xiongan New District, all returnees from Fengtai District, Beijing).

On January 24, 2 new local cases of new coronavirus pneumonia were confirmed in Hebei Province (Xiongan New District, both returnees from Fengtai District, Beijing, who were being quarantined).

On January 25, a confirmed case of new coronary pneumonia was found in Laishui County, a migrant worker returning home from Fengtai District, Beijing, who was undergoing home health monitoring.

On January 28, 1 new local confirmed case of new coronavirus pneumonia was added in Hebei Province (Baoding City, close contact of a confirmed case in Beijing).
