= Ati language (China) =

Loloish language of Yunnan, China

Ati
- Native to: China
- Region: Huaning County, Yunnan
- Ethnicity: Yi
- Language family: Sino-Tibetan: Lolo-Burmese; Loloish; Nisoish; Southeastern?; (unclassified); Ati

Language codes
- ISO 639-3: None (mis)
- Glottolog: None

Ati (Chinese: 阿梯/阿替) is an unclassified Loloish language of Huaning County, Yunnan, China.

== Classification ==
Pelkey (2011:431) suggests that the Xiqi, Ati, and Long languages of Huaning County may be Southeastern Loloish languages. Hsiu (2018) also suggests a Southeastern Loloish affiliation.

== Distribution ==
The Huaning County Gazetteer 华宁县志 (1994:514) lists the following locations of Ati.

- Huaxi Township 华溪乡: Xiaozhai 小寨, Daxinzhai 大新寨, Heiniubai 黑牛白
- Chengjiao Township 城郊乡: Faguo 法果, Mada 吗哒, Zanle 咱乐, Chongmai 冲麦
- Xincheng Township 新城乡: Longmu 龙亩, Tulaoyi 土老依, Naguo 那果
- Tonghongdian Township 通红甸乡: Zele 则勒, Momian 磨面, Xiaoguodi 小锅底
- Qinglong Township 青龙镇: Zhongcun 中村, Yifu 矣甫, Daomakan 倒马坎
- Lufeng Township 禄丰乡: Chekaibi 扯开比

== Vocabulary ==
The Huaning County Ethnic Gazetteer (1992:72) provides a short word list of Adu, Ati, Xiqi, Nong, and Azhe transcribed using Chinese characters, shown below. Pinyin transliterations have also been provided below.

English gloss	Chinese gloss	Adu (阿笃语)	Ati (阿梯语)	Xiqi (西期语)	Nong (弄语)	Azhe (阿哲语)
village	寨子	且(qie)	且(qie)	卡(ka)	卡(ka)	卡(ka)
water	水	叶(ye)	叶(ye)	矣咋(yi zha)	翁咋(weng zha)	叶(ye)
girl	小姑娘	燃米诺(ran mi nuo)	尼格莫(ni ge mo)	阿门儿若(a men er ruo)	阿门儿少若(a men er shao ruo)	若麻儿西若(ruo ma er xi ruo)
boy	小伙子	茶塞(cha sai)	差血若(cha(i) xue ruo)	阿杂若(a za ruo)	撮沙若(cuo sha ruo)	若那儿(ruo na er)
corn	包谷	矣白儿(yi bai er)	苏柏儿(su bai er)	阻目(zu mu)	苏木白儿(su mu bai er)	火魔(huo mo)
have	有	杂杂(za za)	杂杂(za za)	白儿(bai er)	杂(za)	祖阿(杂)(zu a (za))
not	无	麻(ma)	麻(ma)	麻(ma)	麻(ma)	阿米(a mi)
