= Luxi, Yunnan =

Luxi, Yunnan may refer to

- Luxi City, Yunnan (潞西市), a city in Dehong Dai and Jingpo Autonomous Prefecture, Yunnan Province, China.
- Luxi County, Yunnan (泸西县), a county in Honghe Hani and Yi Autonomous Prefecture, Yunnan Province, China.
