= Long language =

Unclassified Loloish language of Huaning County, Yunnan, China

Long
- Nong
- Native to: China
- Ethnicity: Yi
- Language family: Sino-Tibetan: Lolo-Burmese; Loloish; Nisoish; Northern Loloish?; (unclassified); Long

Language codes
- ISO 639-3: –

Long or Nong (Chinese: 弄; also called Longmu 龙亩) is an unclassified Loloish language of Huaning County, Yunnan, China. It is also called Luowu 罗婺.

== Classification ==
Pelkey (2011:431) suggests that the Xiqi, Ati, and Long languages of Huaning County may be Southeastern Loloish languages. Hsiu (2018) suggests a Northern Loloish affiliation.

== Distribution ==
The Huaning County Gazetteer 华宁县志 (1994:514) lists the following locations of Nong within Xincheng Township 新城乡: Xincheng 新城, Longmu 龙亩, Kazhai 卡寨, Sheyingzhai 舍阴寨, Shemuduo 舍亩多, Suojugou 所居沟, Pusulu 普苏鲁.

== Vocabulary ==
The Huaning County Ethnic Gazetteer (1992:72) provides a short word list of Adu, Ati, Xiqi, Nong, and Azhe transcribed using Chinese characters, shown below. Pinyin transliterations have also been provided below.

English gloss	Chinese gloss	Adu (阿笃语)	Ati (阿梯语)	Xiqi (西期语)	Nong (弄语)	Azhe (阿哲语)
village	寨子	且(qie)	且(qie)	卡(ka)	卡(ka)	卡(ka)
water	水	叶(ye)	叶(ye)	矣咋(yi zha)	翁咋(weng zha)	叶(ye)
girl	小姑娘	燃米诺(ran mi nuo)	尼格莫(ni ge mo)	阿门儿若(a men er ruo)	阿门儿少若(a men er shao ruo)	若麻儿西若(ruo ma er xi ruo)
boy	小伙子	茶塞(cha sai)	差血若(cha(i) xue ruo)	阿杂若(a za ruo)	撮沙若(cuo sha ruo)	若那儿(ruo na er)
corn	包谷	矣白儿(yi bai er)	苏柏儿(su bai er)	阻目(zu mu)	苏木白儿(su mu bai er)	火魔(huo mo)
have	有	杂杂(za za)	杂杂(za za)	白儿(bai er)	杂(za)	祖阿(杂)(zu a (za))
not	无	麻(ma)	麻(ma)	麻(ma)	麻(ma)	阿米(a mi)
