= County-level divisions of China =

Third-level administrative divisions of China

County-level division 县级行政区 Xiàn Jí Xíngzhèngqū
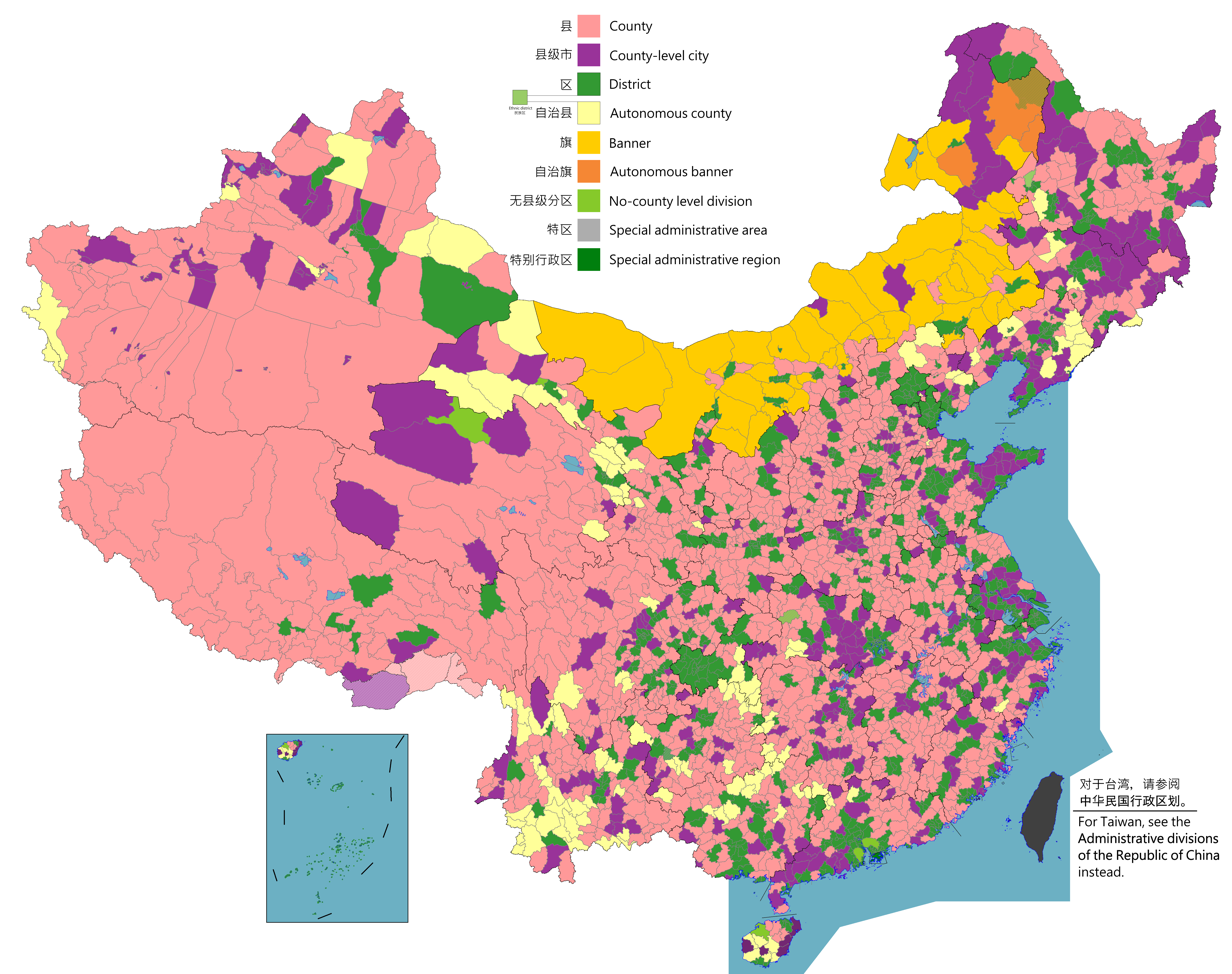
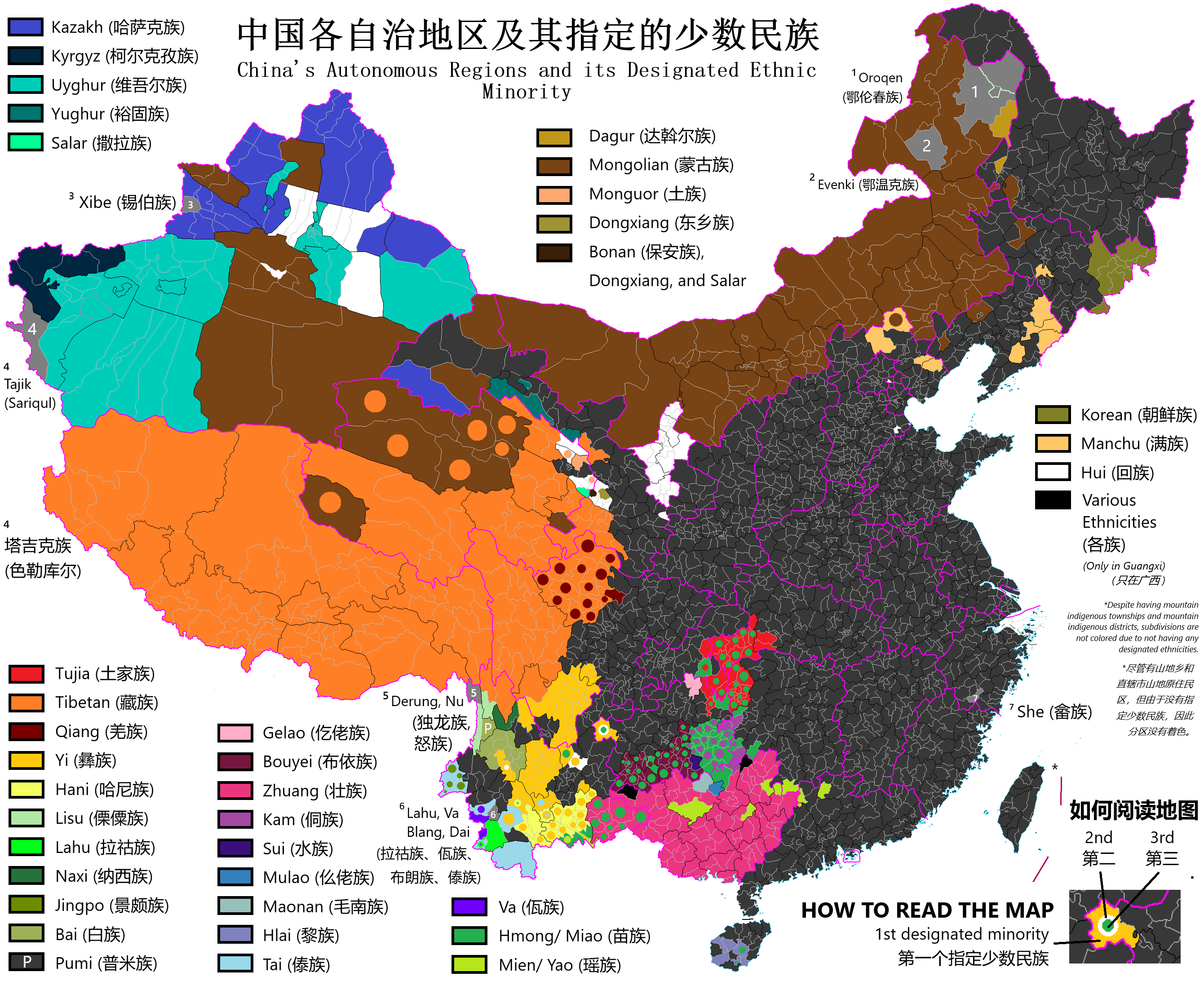
- China's Autonomous Regions and their Designated Ethnic Minority
- Category: Third level administrative division of a unitary state
- Location: China
- Number: 2,842 county-level divisions including 172 in Taiwan Province (Note: As Taiwan and Penghu are currently administered by the Republic of China, its administrative divisions differ from those in provinces administered by the People's Republic of China.) (as of 2023)
- Populations: 6,567 (Zanda) – 14,047,625 (Pudong)
- Areas: 10 km^{2} (3.9 sq mi) (Xisha) – 124,500 km^{2} (48,100 sq mi) (Golmud)
- Government: Various, provincial government, central government
- Subdivisions: Townships

County-level divisions
- Simplified Chinese: 县级行政区
- Traditional Chinese: 縣級行政區
Transcriptions
Standard Mandarin
- Hanyu Pinyin: Xiàn Jí Xíngzhèngqū

The People's Republic of China (PRC) is divided into 2,854 county-level divisions which rank below prefectures/provinces and above townships as the third-level administrative division in the country. Of these, 2,842 are located in territory controlled by the PRC, while 172 are located in land controlled by the Republic of China (ROC).

There are six types of county-level divisions:

- 1,123 districts (965 in mainland China and 158 in the claimed Taiwan Province)
- 411 county-level cities (408 in mainland China and 3 in Taiwan)
- 1,319 counties (1,307 in mainland China and 12 controlled by the Republic of China)
- 117 autonomous counties and banners
- 1 special district
- 1 forestry district

== History ==
Xian have existed since the Warring States period and were set up nationwide by the Qin dynasty. The number of counties in China proper gradually increased from dynasty to dynasty. As Qin Shi Huang reorganized the counties after his unification, there were about 1,000. Under the Eastern Han dynasty, the number of counties increased to above 1,000. About 1400 existed when the Sui dynasty abolished the commandery level (郡 jùn), which was the level just above counties, and demoted some commanderies to counties. The current number of counties mostly resembled that of the later years of Qing dynasty. Changes of location and names of counties in Chinese history have been a major field of research in Chinese historical geography, especially from the 1960s to the 1980s.

In Imperial China, the county was a significant administrative unit because it marked the lowest level of the imperial bureaucratic structure; in other words, it was the lowest level that the government reached. Government below the county level was often undertaken through informal non-bureaucratic means, varying between dynasties. The head of a county was the magistrate, who oversaw both the day-to-day operations of the county as well as civil and criminal cases.

== Types ==
=== Counties ===
One of the most common types of county-level divisions, counties have been continuously in existence since the Warring States period, much earlier than any other level of government in China. Xian is often translated as "district" or "prefecture". The ruling Chinese Communist Party (CCP) is central to directing government policy in mainland China, each level of administrative division has a local CCP committee. A county's CCP head is called the secretary (中共县委书记), the de facto highest office of the county. Policies are carried out via the people's government of the county, and its head is called the county governor (县长). The governor is often also one of the deputy secretaries in the CCP Committee.

=== County-level cities ===
A county-level city is a "city" (市; shì) and "county" (县; xiàn) that have been merged into one unified jurisdiction. As such, it is simultaneously a city, which is a municipal entity, and a county, which is an administrative division of a prefecture. Most county-level cities were created in the 1980s and 1990s by replacing denser populated counties. Compared to counties, they have judicial but no legislative rights over their own local law and are usually governed by prefecture-level divisions, but a few are governed directly by province-level divisions.

Because county-level cities are not "cities" in the strictest sense of the word, since they usually contain rural areas many times the size of their urban, built-up area. This is because the counties that county-level cities have replaced are themselves large administrative units containing towns, villages and farmland. To distinguish a "county-level city" from its actual urban area (the traditional meaning of the word "city"), the term "市区" (shìqū) or "urban area", is used.

=== Districts ===
District are subdivisions of a municipality or a prefecture-level city. The rank of a district derives from the rank of its city. Districts of a municipality are prefecture-level; districts of a sub-provincial city are sub-prefecture-level; and districts of a prefecture-level city are county-level. They were formerly the subdivisions of urban areas, consisting of built-up areas only. Recently many counties have become districts, so that districts are now often just like counties, with towns, villages, and farmland. After the 1980s, prefectures began to be replaced with prefecture-level cities. From then on, "cities" in mainland China became just like any other administrative division, containing urban areas, towns, villages, and farmland. These cities are subdivided into districts, counties, autonomous counties, and county-level cities. At the same time, counties and county-level cities began to be replaced with districts, especially after 1990. From then onwards, districts were no longer strictly urban entities—some districts today are just like counties, with large towns and townships under them governing rural areas.

Other two specialty districts exists, with a special county-level forestry district located in Hubei province and a special county-level division located in Guizhou province.

=== Banners ===
Banners were first used during the Qing dynasty, which organized the Mongols into banners, except those who belonged to the Eight Banners. Each banner had sums as nominal subdivisions. In Inner Mongolia, several banners made up a league. In the rest, including Outer Mongolia, northern Xinjiang, and Qinghai, Aimag (Аймаг) was the largest administrative division. While it restricted the Mongols from crossing banner borders, the dynasty protected Mongolia from population pressure from China proper. After the Mongolian People's Revolution, the banners of Outer Mongolia were abolished in 1923. There are 52 in total, including 3 autonomous banners.

=== Autonomous counties ===
Autonomous counties are county-level autonomous administrative divisions of China. They are counties designated for a minority group.

=== Ethnic districts ===
Ethnic districts are city districts that are specially created for ethnic minorities. Currently there are five such "ethnic districts": three in Henan, one in Heilongjiang, and one in Inner Mongolia.

== List ==
| Provincial level division(s) | Counties | County-level cities | Districts | Banners | Autonomous counties | Autonomous banners | Ethnic districts | Other | Total |
|---|---|---|---|---|---|---|---|---|---|
| Anhui | 50 | 9 | 45 | 0 | 0 | 0 | 0 | 0 | 104 |
| Beijing | 0 | 0 | 16 | 0 | 0 | 0 | 0 | 0 | 16 |
| Chongqing | 8 | 0 | 26 | 0 | 4 | 0 | 0 | 0 | 38 |
| Fujian | 44 (Note: Kinmen and Lienchiang County are governed by the Republic of China as part of its Fuchien Province and are claimed by the PRC.) | 13 | 29 | 0 | 0 | 0 | 0 | 0 | 86 |
| Gansu | 57 | 7 | 17 | 0 | 7 | 0 | 0 | 0 | 86 |
| Guangdong | 36 | 20 | 64 | 0 | 3 | 0 | 0 | 0 | 123 |
| Guangxi | 47 | 11 | 40 | 0 | 12 | 0 | 0 | 0 | 110 |
| Guizhou | 50 | 10 | 16 | 0 | 11 | 0 | 0 | 1 (Note: Liuzhi Special District) | 88 |
| Hainan | 4 | 5 | 10 | 0 | 4 | 0 | 0 | 0 | 23 |
| Hebei | 93 | 20 | 48 | 0 | 6 | 0 | 0 | 0 | 167 |
| Heilongjiang | 45 | 21 | 53 | 0 | 1 | 0 | 1 | 0 | 121 |
| Henan | 83 | 22 | 50 | 0 | 6 | 0 | 3 | 0 | 158 |
| Hubei | 35 | 26 | 39 | 0 | 2 | 0 | 0 | 1 (Note: Shennongjia Forestry District) | 103 |
| Hunan | 59 | 19 | 36 | 0 | 7 | 0 | 0 | 0 | 121 |
| Inner Mongolia | 17 | 11 | 22 | 49 | 0 | 3 | 1 | 0 | 103 |
| Jiangsu | 19 | 21 | 55 | 0 | 0 | 0 | 0 | 0 | 95 |
| Jiangxi | 61 | 11 | 27 | 0 | 0 | 0 | 0 | 0 | 99 |
| Jilin | 16 | 20 | 21 | 0 | 3 | 0 | 0 | 0 | 60 |
| Liaoning | 18 | 16 | 59 | 0 | 8 | 0 | 0 | 0 | 101 |
| Ningxia | 11 | 2 | 9 | 0 | 3 | 0 | 0 | 0 | 22 |
| Qinghai | 25 | 5 | 7 | 0 | 7 | 0 | 0 | 0 | 44 |
| Shaanxi | 70 | 7 | 30 | 0 | 0 | 0 | 0 | 0 | 107 |
| Shandong | 52 | 26 | 58 | 0 | 0 | 0 | 0 | 0 | 136 |
| Shanghai | 0 | 0 | 16 (Note: Including the Pudong New Area) | 0 | 0 | 0 | 0 | 0 | 16 |
| Shanxi | 80 | 11 | 26 | 0 | 0 | 0 | 0 | 0 | 117 |
| Sichuan | 106 | 19 | 54 | 0 | 4 | 0 | 0 | 0 | 183 |
| Taiwan | 11 | 3 | 158 (Note: There are 158 districts claimed by the PRC and they are governed by the ROC's six special municipalities.) | 0 | 0 | 0 | 0 | 0 | 172 |
| Tianjin | 0 | 0 | 16 | 0 | 0 | 0 | 0 | 0 | 16 |
| Tibet | 64 | 2 | 8 | 0 | 0 | 0 | 0 | 0 | 74 |
| Xinjiang | 61 | 27 (Note: Ten of the county-level cities do not belong to any prefecture and are de facto administered by the Xinjiang Production and Construction Corps (XPCC).) | 13 | 0 | 6 | 0 | 0 | 0 | 107 |
| Yunnan | 65 | 18 | 17 | 0 | 29 | 0 | 0 | 0 | 129 |
| Zhejiang | 32 | 20 | 37 | 0 | 1 | 0 | 0 | 0 | 90 |

== See also ==
- Administrative divisions of China
- Counties of China
- County-level city
- District (China)
- Autonomous county
- Counties of Taiwan
