= Dajie =

Dàjiē (大街) may refer to the following locations in China:

- Dajie, Jiangchuan County, town in Yunnan

Townships

- Dajie Township, Weining County, in Weining Yi, Hui, and Miao Autonomous County, Guizhou
- Dajie Township, Daming County, Hebei
- Dajie Township, Jingdong County, in Jingdong Yi Autonomous County, Yunnan
- Dajie Township, Longyou County, in Longyou County, Zhejiang
