= Adu language =

Loloish language of Yunnan, China

Adu
- Native to: China
- Ethnicity: Yi
- Language family: Sino-Tibetan: Lolo-Burmese; Loloish; Nisoish; Southeastern?; (unclassified); Adu

Language codes
- ISO 639-3: –

Adu (Chinese: 阿笃) is an unclassified Loloish language of Huaning County, Yunnan, China.

== Classification ==
Pelkey (2011:431) suggests that the neighboring Xiqi, Ati, and Long languages of Huaning County may be Southeastern Loloish languages. Hsiu (2018) also suggests a Southeastern Loloish affiliation.

== Distribution ==
The Huaning County Gazetteer 华宁县志 (1994:514) lists the following locations of Adu.

- Qinglong Town 青龙镇: Songzichang 松子场, Xinzhai 新寨, Douju 斗居, Chengmendong 城门洞, Niuqiduo 牛期多
- Lufeng Township 禄丰乡: Gele 革勒

== Vocabulary ==
The Huaning County Ethnic Gazetteer (1992:72) provides a short word list of Adu, Ati, Xiqi, Nong, and Azhe transcribed using Chinese characters, shown below. Pinyin transliterations have also been provided below.

English gloss	Chinese gloss	Adu (阿笃语)	Ati (阿梯语)	Xiqi (西期语)	Nong (弄语)	Azhe (阿哲语)
village	寨子	且(qie)	且(qie)	卡(ka)	卡(ka)	卡(ka)
water	水	叶(ye)	叶(ye)	矣咋(yi zha)	翁咋(weng zha)	叶(ye)
girl	小姑娘	燃米诺(ran mi nuo)	尼格莫(ni ge mo)	阿门儿若(a men er ruo)	阿门儿少若(a men er shao ruo)	若麻儿西若(ruo ma er xi ruo)
boy	小伙子	茶塞(cha sai)	差血若(cha(i) xue ruo)	阿杂若(a za ruo)	撮沙若(cuo sha ruo)	若那儿(ruo na er)
corn	包谷	矣白儿(yi bai er)	苏柏儿(su bai er)	阻目(zu mu)	苏木白儿(su mu bai er)	火魔(huo mo)
have	有	杂杂(za za)	杂杂(za za)	白儿(bai er)	杂(za)	祖阿(杂)(zu a (za))
not	无	麻(ma)	麻(ma)	麻(ma)	麻(ma)	阿米(a mi)
