= Shijie =

Shijie may refer to:

== Geographical locations ==
- Shijie, Anhui (誓节), a town in Guangde County, Anhui, China
- Shijie, Guangdong (石碣), a town in Dongguan, Guangdong, China
- Shijie Yi Ethnic Township (十街彝族乡), a township in Yimen County, Yunnan, China

== Other uses ==
- The World (film) (世界), a 2004 Chinese film directed by Jia Zhangke
- Shijie (Daoism), "liberation by means of a simulated corpse" techniques for achieving transcendence

== See also ==
- Jie Schöpp (born 1968), born Shi Jie, Chinese-born German table tennis player
