= Mazhuang Township, Xinji =

Coordinates: 37.78577°N 115.30032°E

- Township

Chinese transcription(s)
- Interactive map of Mazhuang Township, Xinji
- Country: China
- Province: Hebei
- Prefecture: Shijiazhuang
- County-level city: Xinji
- Time zone: UTC+8 (China Standard Time)

Mazhuang Township, Xinji (Chinese: 马庄乡) is a township-level division of Xinji, Shijiazhuang, Hebei, China.

== See also ==
- List of township-level divisions of Hebei
