= Wangkou, Hebei =

Coordinates: 37°39′25″N 115°16′49″E

Wangkou, Xinji 王口镇
- Town

Chinese transcription(s)
- Interactive map of Wangkou, Xinji
- Country: China
- Province: Hebei
- Prefecture: Shijiazhuang
- County-level city: Xinji
- Time zone: UTC+8 (China Standard Time)

Wangkou, Xinji (Chinese: 王口镇) is a township-level division of Xinji, Shijiazhuang, Hebei, China.

== See also ==
- List of township-level divisions of Hebei
