= Juancheng County =

Juancheng County 鄄城县
- County
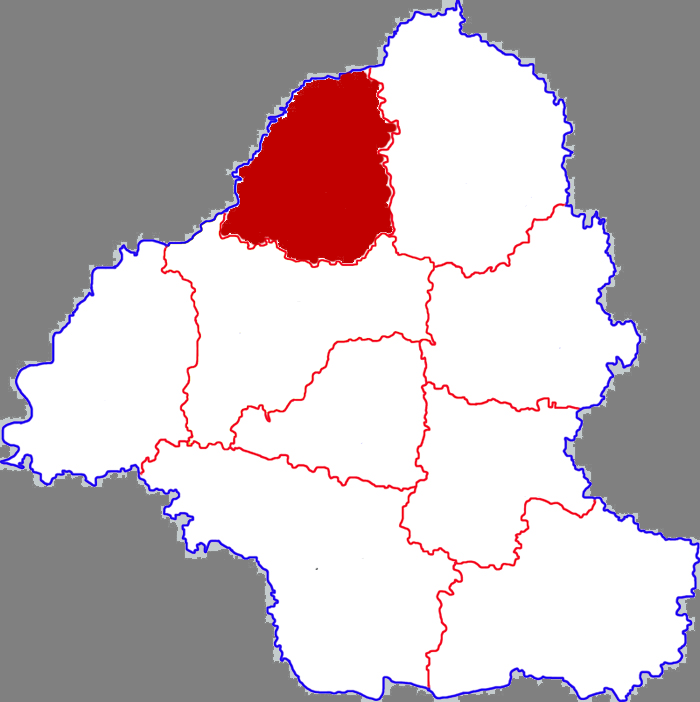
- Location in Heze

- Location of the seat in Shandong
- Coordinates: 35.563°N 115.510°E
- Country: People's Republic of China
- Province: Shandong
- Prefecture-level city: Heze

Area
  - Total: 1,032 km^{2} (398 sq mi)
- Elevation: 50 m (160 ft)

Population (2019)
  - Total: 767,100
  - Density: 743.3/km^{2} (1,925/sq mi)
- Time zone: UTC+8 (China Standard)
- Postal code: 274600
- Website: www.juancheng.gov.cn

Juancheng County
- Simplified Chinese: 鄄城县
- Traditional Chinese: 鄄城縣
Transcriptions
Standard Mandarin
- Hanyu Pinyin: Juànchéng Xiàn
Yue: Cantonese
- Jyutping: gyun^{3}sing^{4} jyun^{2}

Juancheng County falls under the jurisdiction of Heze, in the southwest of Shandong province, China. The population is approximately 800,000.

== Administrative divisions ==
As of 2026, this county is divided to 15 towns.

Towns

- Juancheng (鄄城镇)
- Shiji (什集镇)
- Hongchuan (红船镇)
- Jiucheng (旧城镇)
- Yanshi (闫什镇)
- Jishan (箕山镇)
- Lijinshitang (李进士堂镇)
- Dongkou (董口镇)
- Linpu (临濮镇)
- Penglou (彭楼镇)
- Zuoying Township (左营乡)
- Danian Township (大埝乡)
- Yinma Township (引马乡)
- Fenghuang Township (凤凰乡)
- Fuchun Township (富春乡)
- Zhengying Township (郑营乡)

== Climate ==
Climate data for Juancheng, elevation 50 m (160 ft), (1991–2020 normals, extremes 1981–2010)
Month	Jan	Feb	Mar	Apr	May	Jun	Jul	Aug	Sep	Oct	Nov	Dec	Year
Record high °C (°F)	17.0 (62.6)	21.6 (70.9)	28.2 (82.8)	33.2 (91.8)	37.0 (98.6)	40.4 (104.7)	40.7 (105.3)	36.6 (97.9)	36.6 (97.9)	32.5 (90.5)	27.0 (80.6)	21.2 (70.2)	40.7 (105.3)
Mean daily maximum °C (°F)	4.4 (39.9)	8.6 (47.5)	15.0 (59.0)	21.4 (70.5)	26.8 (80.2)	31.7 (89.1)	31.9 (89.4)	30.5 (86.9)	26.9 (80.4)	21.4 (70.5)	13.3 (55.9)	6.3 (43.3)	19.9 (67.7)
Daily mean °C (°F)	−0.8 (30.6)	2.9 (37.2)	9.1 (48.4)	15.3 (59.5)	20.8 (69.4)	25.7 (78.3)	27.1 (80.8)	25.6 (78.1)	21.1 (70.0)	15.0 (59.0)	7.4 (45.3)	1.1 (34.0)	14.2 (57.6)
Mean daily minimum °C (°F)	−4.7 (23.5)	−1.3 (29.7)	4.0 (39.2)	9.8 (49.6)	15.3 (59.5)	20.4 (68.7)	23.3 (73.9)	22.0 (71.6)	16.8 (62.2)	10.1 (50.2)	2.9 (37.2)	−2.7 (27.1)	9.7 (49.4)
Record low °C (°F)	−20.0 (−4.0)	−14.9 (5.2)	−8.2 (17.2)	−2.1 (28.2)	2.3 (36.1)	10.8 (51.4)	17.4 (63.3)	11.4 (52.5)	5.5 (41.9)	−3.1 (26.4)	−16.5 (2.3)	−15.0 (5.0)	−20.0 (−4.0)
Average precipitation mm (inches)	6.6 (0.26)	10.6 (0.42)	13.8 (0.54)	29.2 (1.15)	49.1 (1.93)	63.6 (2.50)	168.9 (6.65)	118.4 (4.66)	67.8 (2.67)	28.2 (1.11)	29.7 (1.17)	8.3 (0.33)	594.2 (23.39)
Average precipitation days (≥ 0.1 mm)	3.1	3.9	4.4	5.1	6.5	7.5	10.6	10.4	7.9	5.8	5.0	3.1	73.3
Average snowy days	3.6	3.0	0.8	0.2	0	0	0	0	0	0	0.9	2.3	11
Average relative humidity (%)	67	62	57	63	67	65	79	84	79	72	70	68	69
Mean monthly sunshine hours	118.4	127.9	182.4	206.3	230.4	209.5	175.8	168.2	161.1	153.8	136.8	124.8	1,995.4
Percentage possible sunshine	38	41	49	52	53	48	40	41	44	45	45	41	45
Source: China Meteorological Administration

== Culture ==
The culture of Juancheng is heavily influenced by Henan. The local dialect is closer to that of Henan (河南省), and the local cuisine is similar to Henan (河南省). Lamb soup, pan-fried buns, and Mung bean balls are some staple local foods. Juancheng is known for its peony production, exporting millions of peonies annually. Juancheng is a vital production base for peonies, which are exported for fresh blooms and peony pastries. Juancheng is also a major textile production hub, famous for its Lu Brocade weaving.
