= Zhangguzhuang =

Coordinates: 38°02′N 115°16′E

Zhangguzhuang 张古庄镇
- Town

Chinese transcription(s)
- Interactive map of Zhangguzhuang
- Country: China
- Province: Hebei
- Prefecture: Shijiazhuang
- County-level city: Xinji
- Time zone: UTC+8 (China Standard Time)

Zhangguzhuang (Chinese: 张古庄镇) is a township-level division of Xinji, Shijiazhuang, Hebei, China.

== See also ==
- List of township-level divisions of Hebei
