= Yongning Township, Honghe Prefecture =

Yongning Township 永宁乡
- Township
- Location in Yunnan
- Coordinates: 24°22′30″N 103°41′9″E
- Country: People's Republic of China
- Province: Yunnan
- Autonomous prefecture: Honghe Hani and Yi Autonomous Prefecture
- County: Luxi County
- Time zone: UTC+8 (China Standard)

Yongning Township (simplified Chinese: 永宁乡; traditional Chinese: 永寧鄉; pinyin: Yǒngníng Xiāng) is a township under the administration of Luxi County, Yunnan, China. As of 2018, it has six villages under its administration.
