= Huaning County =

Huaning 华宁县
- County
- Location of Huaning County (red) and Yuxi City (pink) within Yunnan province

- Location of the seat in Yunnan
- Coordinates: 24°15′50″N 103°01′00″E
- Country: People's Republic of China
- Province: Yunnan
- Prefecture-level city: Yuxi

Area
  - Total: 1,114 km^{2} (430 sq mi)

Population
  - Total: 194,897
  - Density: 175.0/km^{2} (453.1/sq mi)
- Time zone: UTC+8 (CST)
- Postal code: 652800
- Area code: 0877
- Website: www.huaning.net

Huaning County (simplified Chinese: 华宁县; traditional Chinese: 華寧縣; pinyin: Huáníng Xiàn) is a county under the administration of Yuxi, in southeastern Yunnan Province, China. It borders Mile City to the east, Jianshui County to the south, Tonghai County and Jiangchuan District to the west, and Chengjiang and Yiliang County, Kunming to the north.

== Administrative divisions ==
Huaning County has 1 subdistrict, 3 towns and 1 ethnic township.

1 subdistrict

- Ningzhou (宁州街道)

3 towns

- Panxi (盘溪镇)
- Huaxi (华溪镇)
- Qinglong (青龙镇)

1 ethnic township

- Tonghongdian Yi and Miao (通红甸彝族苗族乡)

== Ethnic groups ==
=== Yi ===
The Huaning County Gazetteer 华宁县志 (1994:514) lists the following six Yi subgroups and their respective geographic distributions.

- Nong 弄 (Longmu 龙亩; also called Luowu 罗婺)
  - Xincheng Township 新城乡: Xincheng 新城, Longmu 龙亩, Kazhai 卡寨, Sheyingzhai 舍阴寨, Shemuduo 舍亩多, Suojugou 所居沟, Pusulu 普苏鲁
- Azhe 阿者/阿哲
  - Panxi Township 盘溪乡 (near Mile and Jianshui): Xincun 新村, Fangna 方那, Jiudian 九甸, Xiaolongtan 小龙潭
- Adu 阿笃
  - Qinglong Town 青龙镇: Songzichang 松子场, Xinzhai 新寨, Douju 斗居, Chengmendong 城门洞, Niuqiduo 牛期多
  - Lufeng Township 禄丰乡: Gele 革勒
- Xiqi (西期) (autonym: ɕi33 tɕʰi33 pʰo21; cf. Siqipo (斯期颇) (sɨ55 tɕʰi55 pʰo21) of Mile County)
  - Tonghongdian Township 通红甸乡: Suomeizao 所梅早村, Dapozuo 大婆左村
  - Panxi Township 盘溪乡: Yide 矣得村, Fagao 法高村, Dayaxi 大丫喜村, Longtanying 龙潭营村
  - Chengjiao Township 城郊乡: Dengloushan 登楼山, Puchazhai 普茶寨
  - Huaxi Township 华溪乡: Xishajing 西沙井村, Dujia 独家村
  - Qinglong Township 青龙镇: Shanqi 山歧村, Qize 起则村
- Ati 阿梯/阿替
  - Huaxi Township 华溪乡: Xiaozhai 小寨, Daxinzhai 大新寨, Heiniubai 黑牛白
  - Chengjiao Township 城郊乡: Faguo 法果, Mada 吗哒, Zanle 咱乐, Chongmai 冲麦
  - Xincheng Township 新城乡: Longmu 龙亩, Tulaoyi 土老依, Naguo 那果
  - Tonghongdian Township 通红甸乡: Zele 则勒, Momian 磨面, Xiaoguodi 小锅底
  - Qinglong Township 青龙镇: Zhongcun 中村, Yifu 矣甫, Daomakan 倒马坎
  - Lufeng Township 禄丰乡: Chekaibi 扯开比
- Axi 阿细
  - Panxi Township 盘溪乡, among the Azhe

The following six Yi subgroups were recorded during the Qing dynasty.

- White Lolo 白倮倮
- Black Lolo 黑倮倮
- Miao Lolo 妙倮倮
- Ati 阿替
- Azhe 阿者
- Pute 普特

=== Miao ===
The following Miao subgroups reside in Huaning County, by order of population size (Huaning County Gazetteer 1994:515):

- Flowery Miao 花苗 (autonym: Mengzhou 猛昼)
- Sinicized Miao 汉苗 (autonym: Mengsha 猛沙)
- White Miao 白苗

Their locations are:

- Tonghongdian Township 通红甸乡: Liuzhai 六寨, Xiaonuojie 小糯节, Zhongzhai 中寨, Xiaopozuo 小婆左, Tangzi 塘子, Guobenglong 狗崩竜, Xiaodele 小得勒, Tonghongdian 通红甸, Xiaolila 小里拉, Xiaoji'ao 箫箕凹, Momian 磨面
- Huaxi Township 华溪乡: Zanlongtan 咱龙潭, Mushebai 暮舍白
- Panxi Township 盘溪乡: Chaoyangzhai 朝阳寨, Zhongshan 钟山, Pingba Xiaozhai 平坝小寨, Dayanzi 大岩子
- Qinglong Township 青龙镇: Laoyingwo 老鹰窝, Daomakan 倒马坎, Hongpo 红坡, Ma'anshan 马鞍山, Xinzhai 新寨, Douni 斗尼
- Lufeng Township 禄丰乡: Shimen 石洞, Luojiawuju 罗家屋居, Zhugudou 住姑斗
- Chengjiao Township 城郊乡: Longdong 龙洞村
- Ningzhou Town 宁州镇

== Climate ==
Climate data for Huaning, elevation 1,703 m (5,587 ft), (1991–2020 normals, extremes 1981–present)
Month	Jan	Feb	Mar	Apr	May	Jun	Jul	Aug	Sep	Oct	Nov	Dec	Year
Record high °C (°F)	25.4 (77.7)	27.5 (81.5)	30.6 (87.1)	32.9 (91.2)	33.6 (92.5)	32.7 (90.9)	32.0 (89.6)	31.1 (88.0)	31.6 (88.9)	28.5 (83.3)	28.7 (83.7)	26.0 (78.8)	33.6 (92.5)
Mean daily maximum °C (°F)	17.9 (64.2)	20.2 (68.4)	23.6 (74.5)	26.5 (79.7)	26.7 (80.1)	26.8 (80.2)	26.4 (79.5)	26.4 (79.5)	25.1 (77.2)	22.6 (72.7)	20.0 (68.0)	17.6 (63.7)	23.3 (74.0)
Daily mean °C (°F)	9.5 (49.1)	11.5 (52.7)	15.0 (59.0)	18.5 (65.3)	20.6 (69.1)	21.8 (71.2)	21.5 (70.7)	21.1 (70.0)	19.7 (67.5)	17.2 (63.0)	12.9 (55.2)	9.9 (49.8)	16.6 (61.9)
Mean daily minimum °C (°F)	3.3 (37.9)	4.6 (40.3)	7.7 (45.9)	11.7 (53.1)	15.7 (60.3)	18.2 (64.8)	18.3 (64.9)	17.6 (63.7)	16.0 (60.8)	13.6 (56.5)	8.0 (46.4)	4.6 (40.3)	11.6 (52.9)
Record low °C (°F)	−3.5 (25.7)	−3.0 (26.6)	−3.1 (26.4)	2.4 (36.3)	5.3 (41.5)	11.6 (52.9)	12.9 (55.2)	10.9 (51.6)	7.2 (45.0)	3.4 (38.1)	−2.2 (28.0)	−7.2 (19.0)	−7.2 (19.0)
Average precipitation mm (inches)	26.7 (1.05)	16.5 (0.65)	21.5 (0.85)	36.9 (1.45)	76.4 (3.01)	172.7 (6.80)	171.0 (6.73)	144.8 (5.70)	98.3 (3.87)	63.5 (2.50)	32.7 (1.29)	17.1 (0.67)	878.1 (34.57)
Average precipitation days (≥ 0.1 mm)	4.5	4.1	5.1	7.8	11.8	15.4	20.0	18.9	13.7	11.9	5.6	4.1	122.9
Average snowy days	0.6	0.1	0.1	0	0	0	0	0	0	0	0	0.2	1
Average relative humidity (%)	72	65	59	60	65	76	80	81	79	79	77	76	72
Mean monthly sunshine hours	210.8	216.5	248.3	249.4	216.1	144.8	121.2	139.4	129.5	131.7	179.1	178.3	2,165.1
Percentage possible sunshine	63	67	66	65	52	36	29	35	35	37	55	54	50
Source: China Meteorological Administrationall-time November record high
