= Jianxing Township, Yunnan =

Jianxing Township 建兴乡
- township
- Location in Yunnan
- Coordinates: 23°43′13″N 101°34′20″E
- Country: People's Republic of China
- Province: Yunnan
- Prefecture-level city: Yuxi
- Autonomous county: Xinping Yi and Dai Autonomous County
- Time zone: UTC+8 (China Standard)

Jianxing Township (simplified Chinese: 建兴乡; traditional Chinese: 建興鄉; pinyin: Jiànxīng Xiāng) is a township in Xinping Yi and Dai Autonomous County, Yunnan province, China. As of 2018, it has one residential community and 6 villages under its administration.

== See also ==
- List of township-level divisions of Yunnan
