= Hemujing Township =

Hemujing Township 和睦井乡
- Township
- Location in Hebei
- Coordinates: 37°55′13″N 115°19′44″E
- Country: People's Republic of China
- Province: Hebei
- Prefecture-level city: Shijiazhuang
- County-level city: Xinji
- Village-level divisions: 18 villages
- Elevation: 35 m (115 ft)
- Time zone: UTC+8 (China Standard)
- Area code: 0311

Hemujing (Chinese: 和睦井; pinyin: Hémùjǐng) is a township under the administration of Xinji City in southern Hebei province, China, located over 10 kilometres (6.2 mi) east of downtown Xinji. As of 2011, it has 18 villages under its administration.

== See also ==
- List of township-level divisions of Hebei
