= Xiangyang Township, Yunnan =

Xiangyang Township 向阳乡
- Township
- Location in Yunnan
- Coordinates: 24°29′45″N 103°53′42″E
- Country: People's Republic of China
- Province: Yunnan
- Autonomous prefecture: Honghe Hani and Yi Autonomous Prefecture
- County: Luxi County
- Time zone: UTC+8 (China Standard)

Xiangyang Township (simplified Chinese: 向阳乡; traditional Chinese: 向陽鄉; pinyin: Xiàngyáng Xiāng) is a township under the administration of Luxi County, Yunnan, China. As of 2018, it has eight villages under its administration.
