= Xiaoxinzhuang Township =

Coordinates: 38°05′39″N 115°14′58″E

Xiaoxinzhuang Township 小辛庄乡
- Township
- Interactive map of Xiaoxinzhuang Township
- Country: China
- Province: Hebei
- Prefecture: Shijiazhuang
- County-level city: Xinji
- Time zone: UTC+8 (China Standard Time)

Xiaoxinzhuang Township (Chinese: 小辛庄乡) is a township-level division of Xinji, Shijiazhuang, Hebei, China.
