= Zhonglixiang Township =

Coordinates: 38°05′05″N 115°20′21″E

Zhonglixiang Township 中里厢乡
- Township

Chinese transcription(s)
- Interactive map of Zhonglixiang Township
- Country: China
- Province: Hebei
- Prefecture: Shijiazhuang
- County-level city: Xinji
- Time zone: UTC+8 (China Standard Time)

Zhonglixiang Township (Chinese: 中里厢乡) is a township-level division of Xinji, Shijiazhuang, Hebei, China.

== See also ==
- List of township-level divisions of Hebei
