= Xincheng, Xinji =

Coordinates: 37°51′42″N 115°18′17″E

Xincheng, Xinji 新城镇
- Town

Chinese transcription(s)
- Interactive map of Xincheng, Xinji
- Country: China
- Province: Hebei
- Prefecture: Shijiazhuang
- District: Xinji
- Time zone: UTC+8 (China Standard Time)

Xincheng, Xinji (Chinese: 新城镇) is a township-level division of Xinji, Shijiazhuang, Hebei, China.

== See also ==
- List of township-level divisions of Hebei
