= Nanzhiqiong =

Coordinates: 37.74917°N 115.23573°E

Nanzhiqiong 南智丘镇
- Town

Chinese transcription(s)
- Interactive map of Nanzhiqiong
- Country: China
- Province: Hebei
- Prefecture: Shijiazhuang
- County-level city: Xinji
- Time zone: UTC+8 (China Standard Time)

Nanzhiqiong (Chinese: 南智丘镇) is a township-level division of Xinji, Shijiazhuang, Hebei, China.

== See also ==
- List of township-level divisions of Hebei
