= Tianjiazhuang Township =

Coordinates: 37°52′53″N 115°11′25″E

Tianjiazhuang Township 田家庄乡
- Township

Chinese transcription(s)
- Interactive map of Tianjiazhuang Township
- Country: China
- Province: Hebei
- Prefecture: Shijiazhuang
- County-level city: Xinji
- Time zone: UTC+8 (China Standard Time)

Tianjiazhuang Township (Chinese: 田家庄乡) is a township-level division of Xinji, Shijiazhuang, Hebei, China.

== See also ==
- List of township-level divisions of Hebei
