= Weibo, Hebei =

Coordinates: 38.02899°N 115.21745°E

Weibo 位伯镇
- Town

Chinese transcription(s)
- Interactive map of Weibo
- Country: China
- Province: Hebei
- Prefecture: Shijiazhuang
- County-level city: Xinji

Population
  - Total: 41,000
- Time zone: UTC+8 (China Standard Time)

Weibo (Chinese: 位伯镇; pinyin: Wèibó) is a township-level division of Xinji, Shijiazhuang, Hebei, China.

== See also ==
- List of township-level divisions of Hebei
