= Tiangongying Township =

Coordinates: 38°04′00″N 115°25′07″E

Tiangongying Township 天宫营乡
- Township

Chinese transcription(s)
- Interactive map of Tiangongying Township
- Country: China
- Province: Hebei
- Prefecture: Shijiazhuang
- County-level city: Xinji
- Time zone: UTC+8 (China Standard Time)

Tiangongying Township (Chinese: 天宫营乡) is a township-level division of Xinji, Shijiazhuang, Hebei, China.

== See also ==
- List of township-level divisions of Hebei
