= Xinleitou =

Coordinates: 37°58′N 115°12′E

Xinleitou 新垒头镇
- Town

Chinese transcription(s)
- Interactive map of Xinleitou
- Country: China
- Province: Hebei
- Prefecture: Shijiazhuang
- County-level city: Xinji
- Time zone: UTC+8 (China Standard Time)

Xinleitou (Chinese: 新垒头镇) is a township-level division of Xinji, Shijiazhuang, Hebei, China.

== See also ==
- List of township-level divisions of Hebei
