= Huaxi, Yunnan =

Huaxi Town 华溪镇
- Town
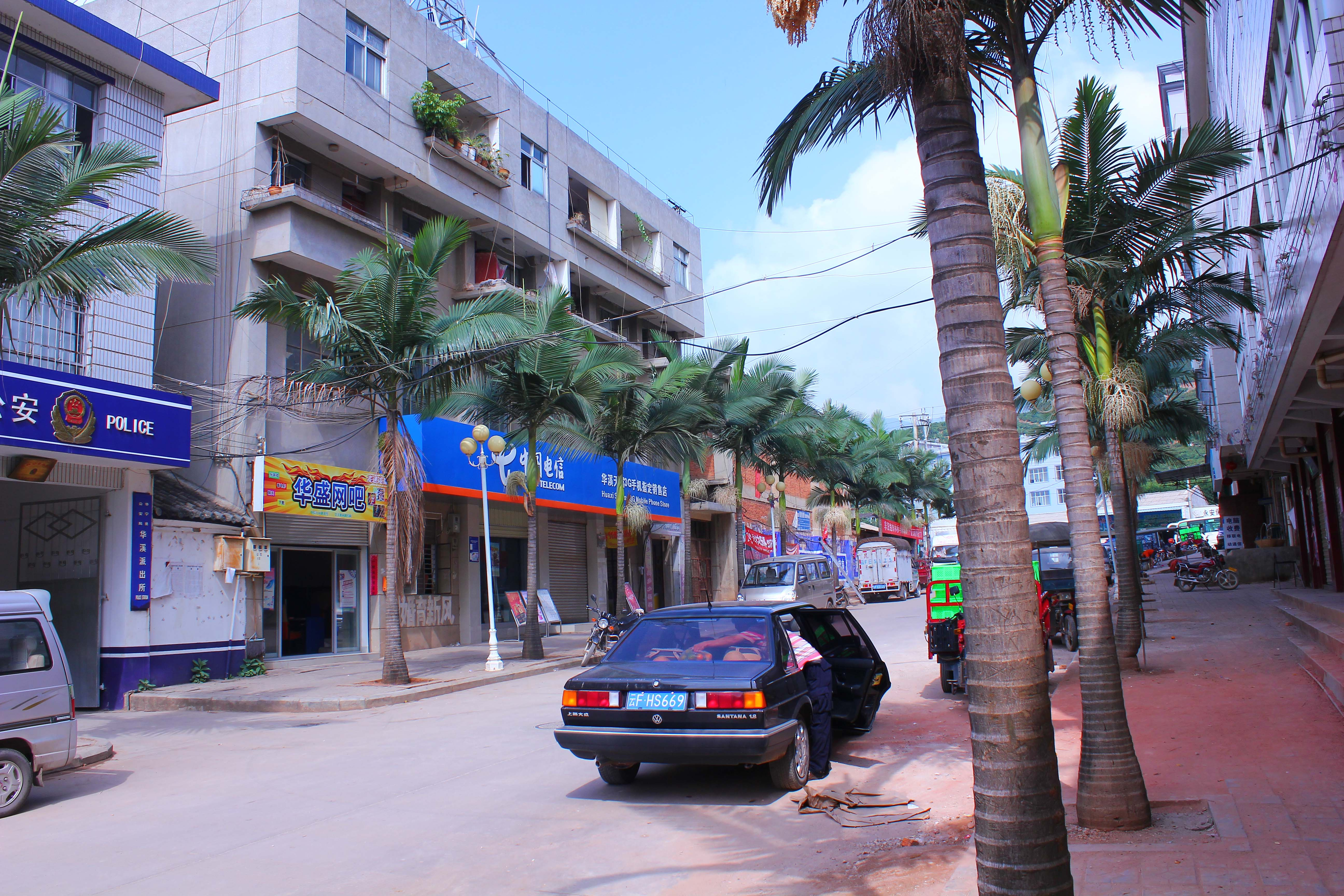

- Location within Yunnan
- Coordinates: 24°03′00″N 103°01′00″E
- Country: China
- Province: Yunnan
- Prefecture: Yuxi
- County: Huaning

Area
  - Total: 140.1 km^{2} (54.1 sq mi)

Population
  - Total: 13,000
  - Density: 93/km^{2} (240/sq mi)
- Time zone: UTC+8 (China Standard)
- Postal code: 652804
- Area code: 0877
- Website: Huaxi Town

Huaxi (simplified Chinese: 华溪; traditional Chinese: 華溪; pinyin: Huáxī) is a town in Yuxi, southern Yunnan Province, Southwest China. It is under the administration of Huaning County. As of 2018, it has two residential communities and four villages under its administration. It is one of the largest orange producers in Yunnan .
