= Yingpan, Lanping County =

Yingpan Town
- Town

Chinese transcription(s)
  - Simplified: 营盘镇
  - Traditional: 營盤鎮
  - Pinyin: yíngpán zhèn
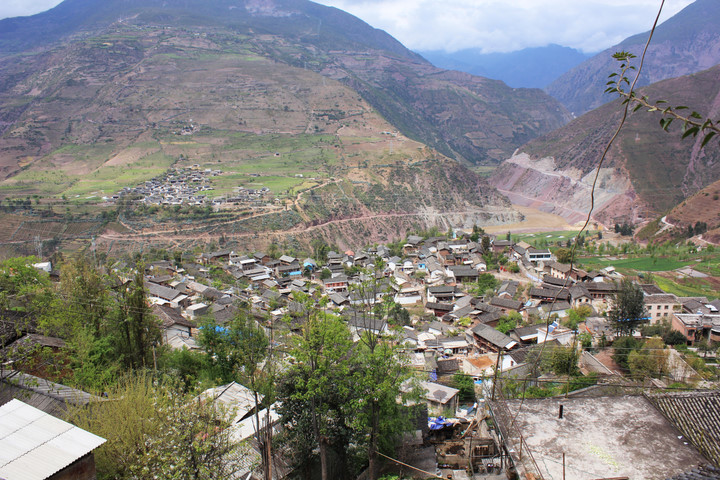

- Location in Yunnan
- Coordinates: 26°28′1″N 99°9′19″E
- Country: China
- Province: Yunnan
- Prefecture: Nujiang
- County: Lanping

Area
  - Total: 561 km^{2} (217 sq mi)
- Elevation: 1,402 m (4,600 ft)

Population
  - Total: 35,000
  - Density: 62/km^{2} (160/sq mi)
- Time zone: UTC+8 (China Standard)
- Postal code: 671406
- Area code: 0886

Yingpan Town is a town of Lanping Bai and Pumi Autonomous County in Yunnan province of China. The town is situated on the Mekong.
