= Xichuan, Gansu =

Xichuan 西川镇
- Town
- Location in Gansu
- Coordinates: 34°51′51″N 105°38′53″E
- Country: People's Republic of China
- Province: Gansu
- Prefecture-level city: Tianshui
- County: Qin'an County
- Time zone: UTC+8 (China Standard)

Xichuan (Chinese: 西川) is a town of Qin'an County, Gansu, China. As of 2020, it has eight residential neighborhoods and 22 villages under its administration.

Neighborhoods

- Wuchuan (吴川)
- Xiawangxia (下王峡)
- Zhengqiao (郑桥)
- Zhangpo (张坡)
- Songxia (宋峡)
- Zheqiao (折桥)
- Wangwan (王湾)
- Lipu (李堡)

Villages

- Anping Village (安坪村)
- Gaopu Village (高堡村)
- Shenmingchuan Village (神明川村)
- Chuankou Village (川口村)
- Pailou Village (牌楼村)
- Houxin Village (侯辛村)
- Luochuan Village (雒川村)
- Songchang Village (宋场村)
- Luopu Village (雒堡村)
- Liwa Village (李洼村)
- Hewan Village (何湾村)
- Wangpu Village (王堡村)
- Yawan Village (鸦湾村)
- Jiangpu Village (姜堡村)
- Wangxia Village (王峡村)
- Shuigou Village (水沟村)
- Xiaozhai Village (小寨村)
- Xiaozhuang Village (小庄村)
- Jiaoshan Village (焦山村)
- Jiangwan Village (姜湾村)
- Zhangxin Village (张辛村)
- Zhangping Village (张坪村)
