= Lajing Town =

- Town

Chinese transcription(s)
  - Simplified: 啦井镇
  - Traditional: 啦井鎮
  - Pinyin: lājǐng zhèn
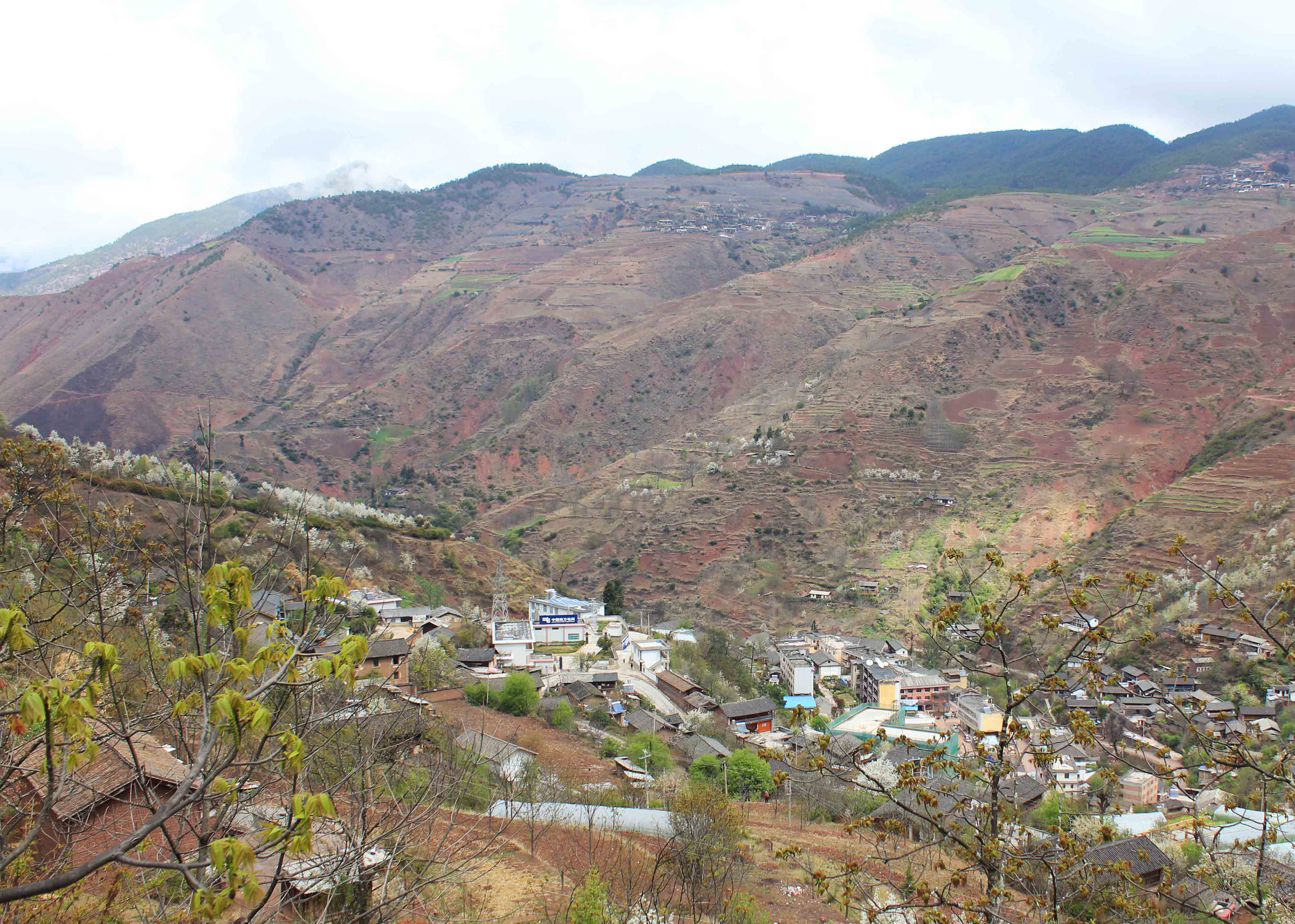

- Location in Yunnan
- Coordinates: 26°29′28″N 99°16′26″E
- Country: China
- Province: Yunnan
- Prefecture: Nujiang
- County: Lanping

Area
  - Total: 509.39 km^{2} (196.68 sq mi)

Population
  - Total: 14,326
  - Density: 28.124/km^{2} (72.840/sq mi)
- Time zone: UTC+8 (China Standard)
- Postal code: 671408
- Area code: 0886

Lajing Town is a town of Lanping Bai and Pumi Autonomous County in Yunnan province of China
