= Xinhua Township, Gansu =

Xinhua Township 新华乡
- Township
- Location relative to Qinghai
- Coordinates: 37°49′45″N 102°35′55″E
- Country: People's Republic of China
- Province: Gansu
- Prefecture-level city: Wuwei
- District: Liangzhou
- Village-level divisions: 13 villages
- Elevation: 1,740 m (5,710 ft)
- Time zone: UTC+8 (China Standard)
- Area code: 0935

Xinhua Township (simplified Chinese: 新华乡; traditional Chinese: 新華鄉; pinyin: Xīnhuá Xiāng; lit. 'new China') is a township of Liangzhou District, Wuwei, Gansu, People's Republic of China, located more than 10 kilometres (6.2 mi) south-southwest of downtown in the southern foothills of the Qilian Mountains. As of 2011, it has 13 villages under its administration.

== See also ==
- List of township-level divisions of Gansu
