= Xinhua District =

Xinhua District may refer to:

- Xinhua District, Cangzhou, Hebei (新华区)
- Xinhua District, Shijiazhuang, Hebei (新华区)
- Xinhua District, Pingdingshan, Henan (新华区)
- Xinhua District, Tainan (新化區)
