= Xinhua Township, Ningnan County =

Xinhua Township 新华乡
- Township
- Location in Sichuan
- Coordinates: 26°56′06″N 102°41′42″E
- Country: People's Republic of China
- Province: Sichuan
- Autonomous prefecture: Liangshan
- County: Ningnan
- Village-level divisions: 6 villages
- Elevation: 1,445 m (4,741 ft)
- Time zone: UTC+8 (China Standard)
- Area code: 0834

Xinhua Township (simplified Chinese: 新华乡; traditional Chinese: 新華鄉; pinyin: Xīnhuá Xiāng; lit. 'new China') is a township of Ningnan County in southern Sichuan province, China, located more than 16 kilometres (9.9 mi) southwest of the county seat as the crow flies. As of 2011, it has six villages under its administration.
