= Xinhua, Xuanhan County =

Xinhua 新华镇
- Town
- Location in Sichuan
- Coordinates: 31°44′36″N 107°59′23″E
- Country: People's Republic of China
- Province: Sichuan
- Prefecture-level city: Dazhou
- County: Xuanhan
- Village-level divisions: 1 residential community 10 villages
- Elevation: 408 m (1,339 ft)
- Time zone: UTC+8 (China Standard)
- Area code: 0818

Xinhua (simplified Chinese: 新华; traditional Chinese: 新華; pinyin: Xīnhuá; lit. 'new China') is a town of Xuanhan County in northeastern Sichuan province, China, located 50 kilometres (31 mi) northeast of the county seat. As of 2011, it has one residential community (社区) and 10 villages under its administration.

== See also ==
- List of township-level divisions of Sichuan
