= Xinhua Subdistrict =

Xinhua Subdistrict (simplified Chinese: 新华街道; traditional Chinese: 新華街道; pinyin: Xīnhuá Jiēdào), Xinhua Road Subdistrict (simplified Chinese: 新华路街道; traditional Chinese: 新華路街道; pinyin: Xīnhuá Lù Jiēdào), or Xinhua Avenue Subdistrict (simplified Chinese: 新华街街道; traditional Chinese: 新華街街道; pinyin: Xīnhuá Jiē Jiēdào) may refer to numerous locations in the People's Republic of China:

== Anhui ==
- Xinhua Subdistrict, Fuyang, in Yingdong District

== Beijing ==
- Xinhua Subdistrict, Beijing, in Tongzhou District

== Gansu ==
- Xinhua Road Subdistrict, Jinchang, in Jinchuan District

== Guangdong ==
- Xinhua Subdistrict, Guangzhou, in Huadu District
- Xinhua Subdistrict, Maoming, in Maonan District
- Xinhua Subdistrict, Shaoguan, in Wujiang District

== Guizhou ==
- Xinhua Subdistrict, Duyun
- Xinhua Road Subdistrict, Guiyang, in Nanming District, Guiyang

== Hebei ==
- Xinhua Avenue Subdistrict, Zhangjiakou, in Qiaoxi District
- Xinhua Road Subdistrict, Chengde, in Shuangqiao District
- Xinhua Road Subdistrict, Renqiu
- Xinhua Road Subdistrict, Shijiazhuang, in Xinhua District

== Heilongjiang ==
- Xinhua Subdistrict, Boli County
- Xinhua Subdistrict, Daqing, in Datong District
- Xinhua Subdistrict, Harbin, in Daoli District
- Xinhua Subdistrict, Mudanjiang, in Aimin District

== Henan ==
- Xinhua Subdistrict, Jiaozuo, in Jiefang District
- Xinhua Subdistrict, Kaifeng, in Gulou District
- Xinhua Subdistrict, Nanyang, Henan, in Wancheng District
- Xinhua Subdistrict, Zhumadian, in Yicheng District
- Xinhua Avenue Subdistrict, Hebi, in Heshan District
- Xinhua Road Subdistrict, Gongyi
- Xinhua Road Subdistrict, Xinmi
- Xinhua Road Subdistrict, Xinzheng

== Hubei ==
- Xinhua Subdistrict, Jianghan District, in Wuhan
- Xinhua Avenue Subdistrict, Xiaogan, in Xiaonan District

== Inner Mongolia ==
- Xinhua Subdistrict, Bayannur, in Linhe District
- Xinhua Subdistrict, Wuhai, in Haibowan District
- Xinhua Avenue Subdistrict, Ulanqab, in Jining District

== Jilin ==
- Xinhua Subdistrict, Baicheng, in Taobei District
- Xinhua Subdistrict, Huadian
- Xinhua Subdistrict, Meihekou
- Xinhua Subdistrict, Tumen

== Liaoning ==
- Xinhua Subdistrict, Chaoyang, Liaoning, in Longcheng District
- Xinhua Subdistrict, Fushun, in Fucheng District
- Xinhua Subdistrict, Liaoyang, in Taizihe District
- Xinhua Subdistrict, Shenyang, in Heping District
- Xinhua Subdistrict, Wafangdian
- Xinhua Subdistrict, Zhuanghe

== Ningxia ==
- Xinhua Avenue Subdistrict, Yinchuan, in Xingqing District

== Shaanxi ==
- Xinhua Road Subdistrict, Xi'an, in Yanliang District

== Shandong ==
- Xinhua Subdistrict, Dezhou, in Decheng District
- Xinhua Road Subdistrict, Linqing

== Shanghai ==
- Xinhua Road Subdistrict, Shanghai, in Changning District

== Shanxi ==
- Xinhua Avenue Subdistrict, Datong, in Chengqu
- Xinhua Subdistrict, Jinzhong, in Yuci District
