= Xinji, Xinji =

Coordinates: 37.9176°N 115.20313°E

Xinji Town 辛集镇
- Town

Chinese transcription(s)
- Interactive map of Xinji Town
- Country: China
- Province: Hebei
- Prefecture: Shijiazhuang
- County-level city: Xinji
- Time zone: UTC+8 (China Standard Time)

Xinji Town (Chinese: 辛集镇) is a township-level division of Xinji, Shijiazhuang, Hebei, China.

== See also ==
- List of township-level divisions of Hebei
- Julu Commandery, ancient Chinese administration whose jurisdiction included modern Xinji Town
