= Xinhua Town, Bayannur =

Xinhua 新华镇 ᠰᠢᠨᠬᠤᠸᠠ ᠬᠣᠲᠠ
- Town
- Location in Inner Mongolia
- Coordinates: 41°03′30″N 107°35′48″E
- Country: People's Republic of China
- Region: Inner Mongolia
- Prefecture-level city: Bayannur
- District: Linhe
- Village-level divisions: 29 villages
- Elevation: 1,035 m (3,396 ft)
- Time zone: UTC+8 (China Standard)
- Area code: 0478

Xinhua (simplified Chinese: 新华; traditional Chinese: 新華; pinyin: Xīnhuá; lit. 'new China') Šenxua (Mongolian: ᠰᠢᠨᠬᠤᠸᠠ; Шэнхуа) is a town of Linhe District, Bayannur, Inner Mongolia, People's Republic of China, located 36 kilometres (22 mi) northeast of downtown. As of 2011, it has 29 villages under its administration.

== See also ==
- List of township-level divisions of Inner Mongolia
