= Xinhua Township, Tianquan County =

Xinhua Township 新华乡
- Township
- Location in Sichuan
- Coordinates: 30°06′41″N 102°52′58″E
- Country: People's Republic of China
- Province: Sichuan
- Prefecture-level city: Ya'an
- County: Tianquan
- Village-level divisions: 10 villages
- Elevation: 680 m (2,230 ft)
- Time zone: UTC+8 (China Standard)
- Area code: 0834

Xinhua Township (simplified Chinese: 新华乡; traditional Chinese: 新華鄉; pinyin: Xīnhuá Xiāng; lit. 'new China') is a township of Tianquan County in western Sichuan province, China, located 13 kilometres (8.1 mi) northeast of the county seat and 16 km (9.9 mi) northwest of Ya'an as the crow flies. As of 2011, it has 10 villages under its administration.
