= Xichuan Township =

Jianxing Township 西川乡
- township
- Location in Yunnan
- Coordinates: 27°4′5″N 100°39′44″E
- Country: People's Republic of China
- Province: Yunnan
- Prefecture-level city: Lijiang
- Autonomous county: Ninglang Yi Autonomous County
- Time zone: UTC+8 (China Standard)

Jianxing Township (simplified Chinese: 西川乡; traditional Chinese: 西川鄉; pinyin: Xīchuān Xiāng) is a township in Ninglang Yi Autonomous County, Yunnan province, China. As of 2020, it has seven villages under its administration:

- Dabaidi Village (大柏地村)
- Shalihe Village (沙力河村)
- Shali Village (沙力村)
- Zhushan Village (竹山村)
- Jiema Village (界马村)
- Shimenkan Village (石门坎村)
- Heichidi Village (黑赤地村)

== See also ==
- List of township-level divisions of Yunnan
