= Jianxing Township, Sichuan =

Jianxing Township 建兴乡
- township
- Location in Sichuan
- Coordinates: 31°45′29″N 105°15′46″E
- Country: People's Republic of China
- Province: Sichuan
- Prefecture-level city: Mianyang
- County: Zitong County
- Time zone: UTC+8 (China Standard)

Jianxing Township (simplified Chinese: 建兴乡; traditional Chinese: 建興鄉; pinyin: Jiànxīng Xiāng) is a township in Zitong County, Sichuan province, China. As of 2018, it has seven villages under its administration.

== See also ==
- List of township-level divisions of Sichuan
