= Liuzhi Special District =

Liuzhi 六枝特区
- Special District
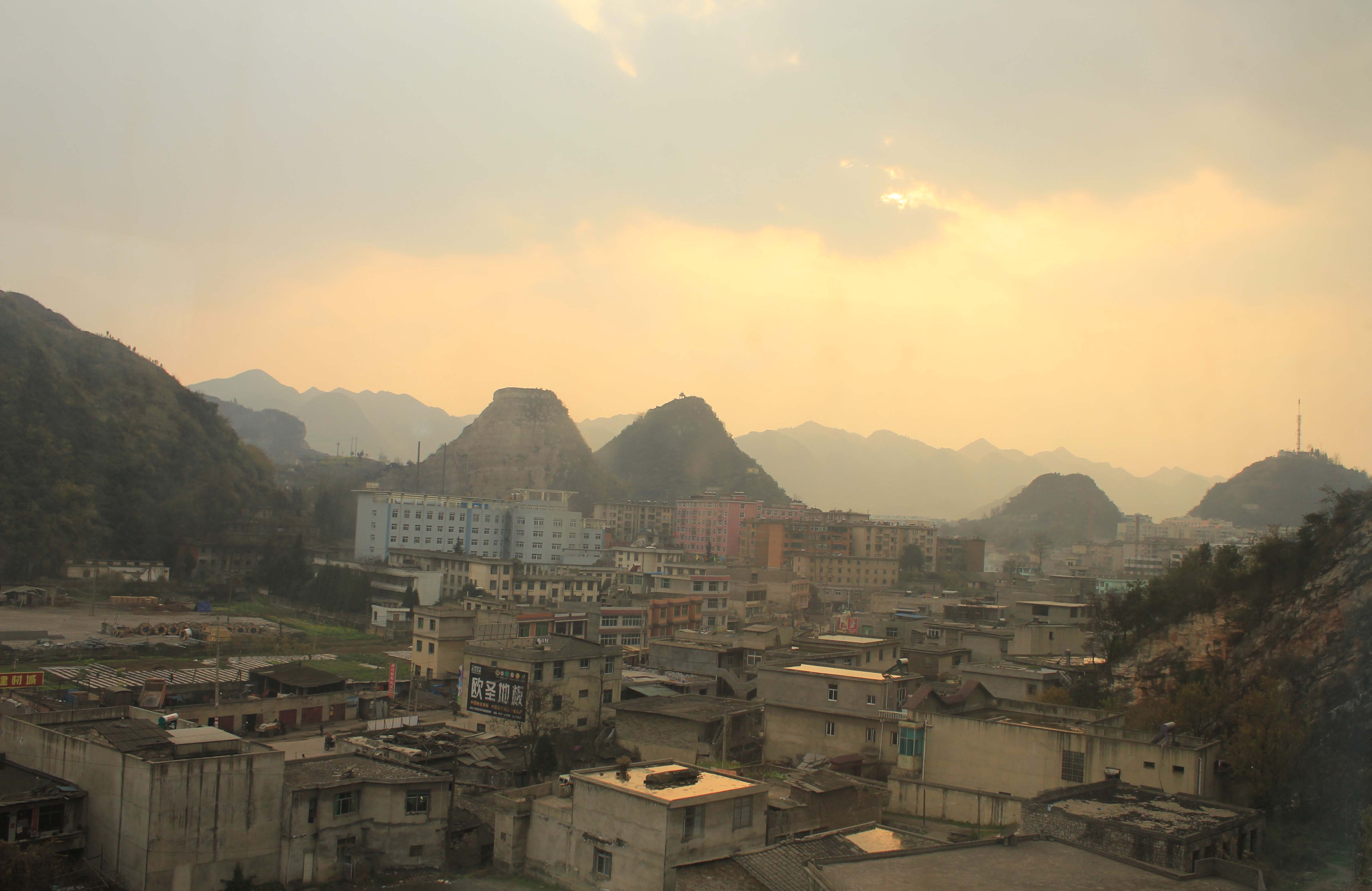
- Interactive map of Liuzhi
- Coordinates (Liuzhi government): 26°12′52″N 105°28′38″E
- Country: China
- Province: Guizhou
- Prefecture-level city: Liupanshui
- District seat: Jiulong

Area
  - Total: 1,792.1 km^{2} (691.9 sq mi)
- Highest elevation: 2,126.9 m (6,978 ft)
- Lowest elevation: 609.5 m (2,000 ft)

Population (2010)
  - Total: 729,000
  - Density: 407/km^{2} (1,050/sq mi)
- Time zone: UTC+8 (China Standard)
- Website: liuzhi.gov.cn

Liuzhi Special District (Chinese: 六枝特区; pinyin: Liùzhī Tèqū) is a district of Guizhou, China. It was known as Langdai County before 1960. The county is under the administration of Liupanshui city, located in the western part of Guizhou Province. It is bounded by Zhijing and Nayong to the north, Guanling to the south, Zhenning and Puding to the east, Shuichen to the west, as well as Qinglong and Pu'an to the southwest. The area is approximately 1,792 km^{2} (692 sq mi). The population is 729,000. There are about 32 ethnic minorities and they account for 30.52% of the population.

Liuzhi is an important coal mining base in Guizhou.

== Administrative divisions ==
Liuzhi governs over 3 subdistrict, 9 towns, 1 township and 5 ethnic townships.

Subdistricts

- Jiulong (九龙街道)
- Yinhu (银壶街道)
- Tashan (塔山街道)

Towns

- Yanjiao (岩脚镇)
- Mugang (木岗镇)
- Dayong (大用镇)
- Guanzhai (关寨镇)
- Zangke (牂牁镇)
- Xinhua (新华镇)
- Longhe (龙河镇)
- Xinyao (新窑镇)
- Langdai (郎岱镇)

Township

- Xinchang (新场乡)

Ethnic townships

- Suojia Miao and Yi Ethnic Township (梭戛苗族彝族回族乡)
- Niuchang Miao and Yi Ethnic Township (牛场苗族彝族乡)
- Zhongzhai Miao, Yi and Bouyei Ethnic Township (中寨苗族彝族布依族乡)
- Luobie Bouyei and Yi Ethnic Township (落别布依族彝族乡)
- Yuelianghe Yi, Bouyei and Miao Ethnic Township (月亮河彝族布依族苗族乡)

== Climate ==
Climate data for Liuzhi, elevation 1,407 m (4,616 ft), (1991–2020 normals, extremes 1981–2010)
Month	Jan	Feb	Mar	Apr	May	Jun	Jul	Aug	Sep	Oct	Nov	Dec	Year
Record high °C (°F)	24.8 (76.6)	29.2 (84.6)	33.3 (91.9)	33.9 (93.0)	34.3 (93.7)	31.9 (89.4)	32.2 (90.0)	34.2 (93.6)	32.1 (89.8)	28.4 (83.1)	27.5 (81.5)	22.3 (72.1)	34.3 (93.7)
Mean daily maximum °C (°F)	8.2 (46.8)	11.6 (52.9)	16.3 (61.3)	21.3 (70.3)	23.7 (74.7)	24.9 (76.8)	26.3 (79.3)	26.7 (80.1)	24.0 (75.2)	19.0 (66.2)	15.6 (60.1)	10.2 (50.4)	19.0 (66.2)
Daily mean °C (°F)	5.2 (41.4)	7.8 (46.0)	11.7 (53.1)	16.4 (61.5)	19.2 (66.6)	21.0 (69.8)	22.2 (72.0)	22.1 (71.8)	19.7 (67.5)	15.6 (60.1)	11.9 (53.4)	7.0 (44.6)	15.0 (59.0)
Mean daily minimum °C (°F)	3.3 (37.9)	5.2 (41.4)	8.7 (47.7)	13.0 (55.4)	15.9 (60.6)	18.3 (64.9)	19.5 (67.1)	19.1 (66.4)	16.9 (62.4)	13.4 (56.1)	9.5 (49.1)	4.9 (40.8)	12.3 (54.2)
Record low °C (°F)	−4.3 (24.3)	−3.5 (25.7)	−2.7 (27.1)	2.4 (36.3)	7.7 (45.9)	11.8 (53.2)	12.8 (55.0)	13.8 (56.8)	8.3 (46.9)	4.1 (39.4)	−0.3 (31.5)	−4.0 (24.8)	−4.3 (24.3)
Average precipitation mm (inches)	26.9 (1.06)	20.0 (0.79)	32.6 (1.28)	65.9 (2.59)	174.6 (6.87)	349.2 (13.75)	280.5 (11.04)	197.7 (7.78)	146.4 (5.76)	98.4 (3.87)	34.2 (1.35)	20.5 (0.81)	1,446.9 (56.95)
Average precipitation days (≥ 0.1 mm)	16.3	14.0	14.1	13.7	17.4	19.4	18.6	17.1	13.8	16.9	11.9	13.6	186.8
Average snowy days	3.1	1.5	0.3	0	0	0	0	0	0	0	0	0.9	5.8
Average relative humidity (%)	85	80	77	74	76	83	84	81	80	83	81	82	81
Mean monthly sunshine hours	40.7	63.1	92.3	121.4	119.1	89.7	127.6	147.5	111.9	65.4	76.6	51.4	1,106.7
Percentage possible sunshine	12	20	25	32	29	22	30	37	31	18	24	16	25
Source: China Meteorological Administration
