= Qianying Township, Hebei =

Coordinates: 37.95648°N 115.35208°E

Qianying Township 前营乡
- Township

Chinese transcription(s)
- Interactive map of Qianying Township
- Country: China
- Province: Hebei
- Prefecture: Shijiazhuang
- County-level city: Xinji
- Time zone: UTC+8 (China Standard Time)

Qianying Township (Chinese: 前营乡) is a township-level division of Xinji, Shijiazhuang, Hebei, China.

== See also ==
- List of township-level divisions of Hebei
