= Xinhua, Linze County =

Xinhua 新华镇
- Town
- Location relative to Qinghai
- Coordinates: 39°11′43″N 100°01′29″E
- Country: People's Republic of China
- Province: Gansu
- Prefecture-level city: Zhangye
- County: Linze
- Village-level divisions: 11 villages
- Elevation: 1,437 m (4,715 ft)
- Time zone: UTC+8 (China Standard)
- Area code: 0936

Xinhua (simplified Chinese: 新华; traditional Chinese: 新華; pinyin: Xīnhuá; lit. 'new China') is a town of Linze County in west-central Gansu province, China, located 47 kilometres (29 mi) northwest of Zhangye and serviced by China National Highway 312; G30 Lianyungang–Khorgas Expressway passes just to the town's south. As of 2011, it has 11 villages under its administration.

== See also ==
- List of township-level divisions of Gansu
