= Jiucheng, Shandong =

Jiucheng 旧城镇
- Town
- Location in Shandong Jiucheng (China)
- Coordinates: 35°40′11″N 115°30′23″E
- Country: People's Republic of China
- Province: Shandong
- Prefecture-level city: Heze
- County: Juancheng
- Elevation: 54 m (177 ft)
- Time zone: UTC+8 (China Standard)
- Area code: 0530

Jiucheng (simplified Chinese: 旧城; traditional Chinese: 舊城; pinyin: Jiùchéng; lit. 'old city') is a town in Juancheng County in western Shandong province, China, located between 1 and 2 kilometres (0.62 and 1.24 mi) southeast of the Yellow River as well as the border with Henan and 10 km (6.2 mi) due north of the county seat. As of 2011, it has 36 villages under its administration.

== See also ==
- List of township-level divisions of Shandong
