= Mile City =

Mile 弥勒市
- County-level city
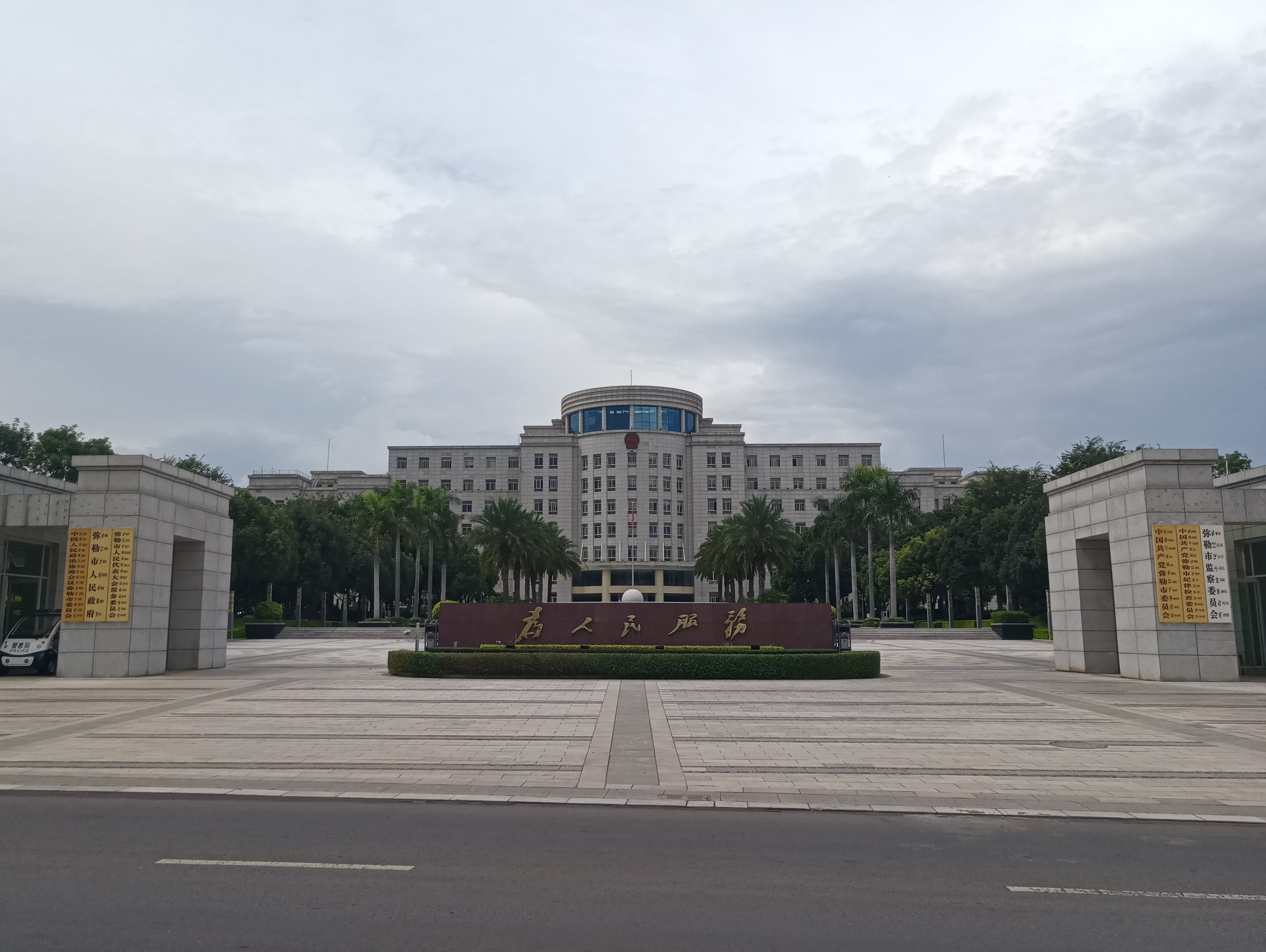
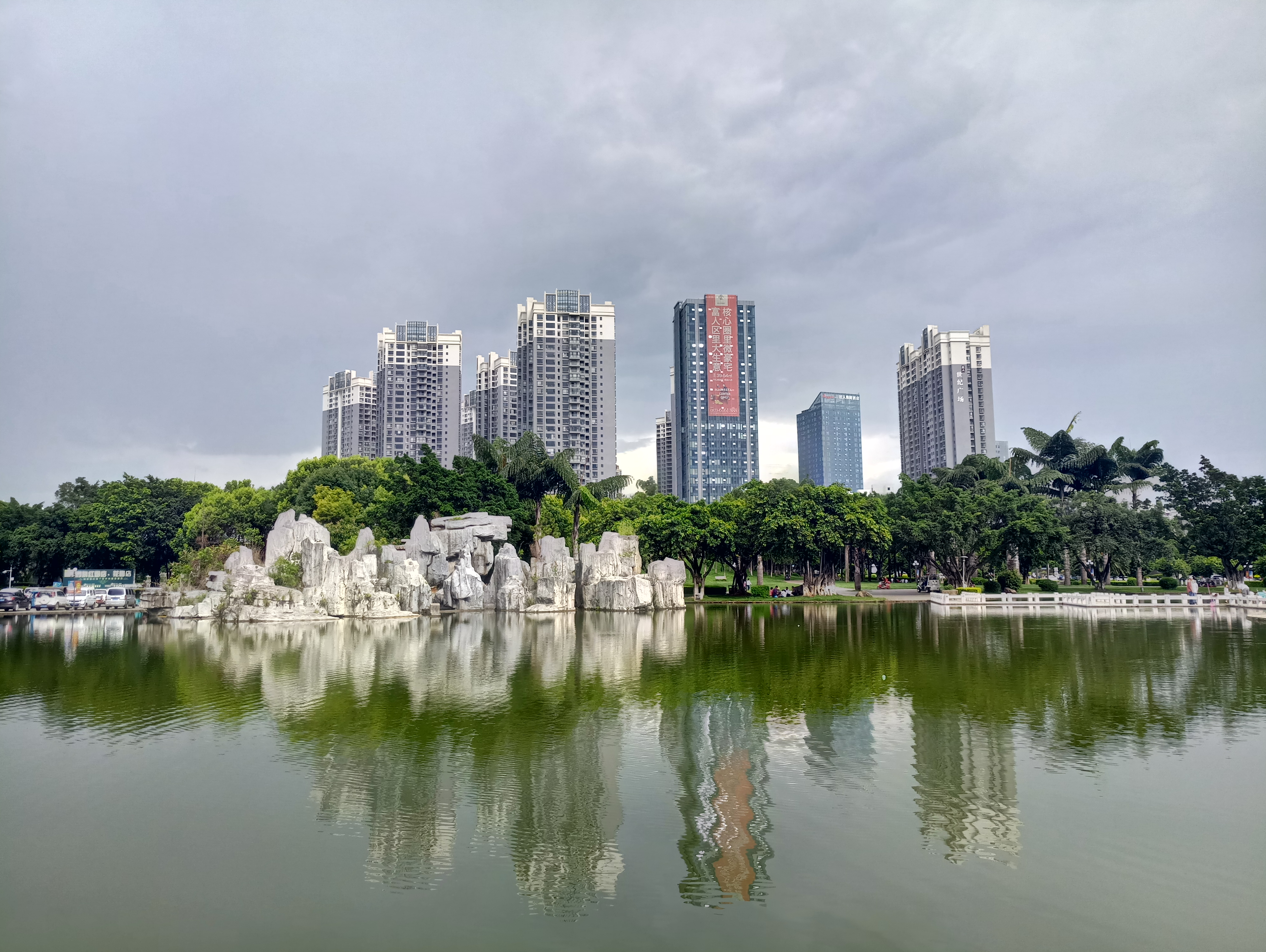
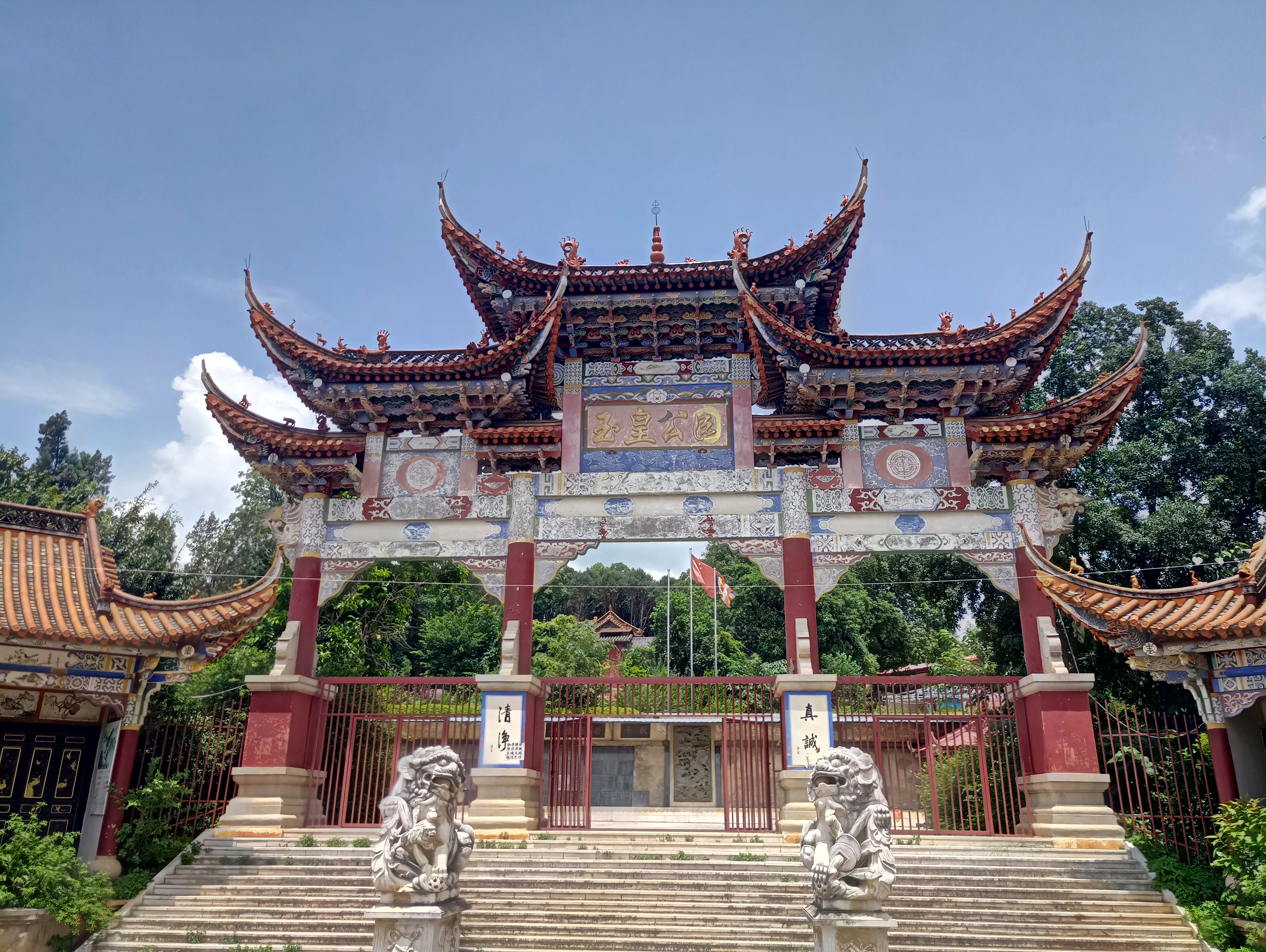
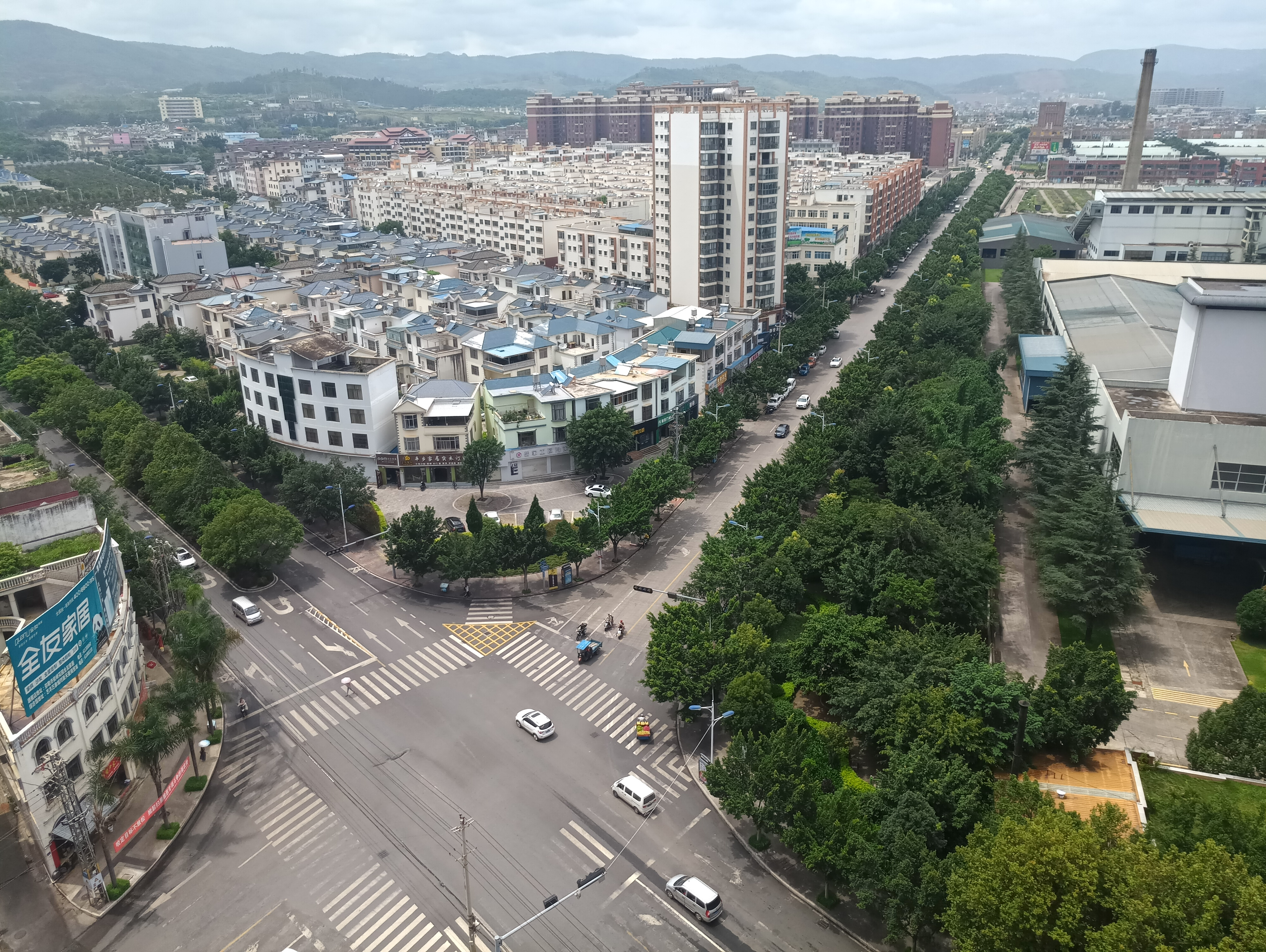
- Mile city hall Qinglai Park Yuhuang Park Downtown skyline

- Location of Mile City in Honghe Prefecture within Yunnan province

- Location of the city center in Yunnan
- Coordinates: 24°24′15″N 103°26′34″E
- Country: People's Republic of China
- Province: Yunnan
- Prefecture: Honghe

Area
  - County-level city: 4,004 km^{2} (1,546 sq mi)
- Highest elevation: 2,315 m (7,595 ft)
- Lowest elevation: 862 m (2,828 ft)

Population (2021)
  - County-level city: 570,100
  - Density: 142.4/km^{2} (368.8/sq mi)
  - Rural (2005): 433,500
- Postal code: 652300
- Area code: 0873
- Website: www.hhml.gov.cn

Mile (Chinese: 弥勒市; pinyin: Mílè Shì; [mǐlɤ̂ ʂî]; Hani language: Miqleiq Siif; Yi: ꂱꇍꏃ) is a county-level city located in Honghe Hani and Yi Autonomous Prefecture, Yunnan province, China. It is named after the Maitreya Buddha, for which there was a temple located on a nearby mountain, making it the only city in China named after a Buddha. It is a center for sugar and tobacco production in Yunnan.

== History ==
Mile has been known since at least 116 BC in written history. In 1290 it was established as a prefecture and in 1770 as a county.

It is the birthplace of Ming dynasty politician Yang Shengwu (杨绳武), Qing dynasty merchant Wang Chi (zh:王炽) and Republic era general Zhang Chong and mathematician Xiong Qinglai.

In 2014, Mile County was upgraded as a county level city.

== Geography ==
Mile City is located in the north of Honghe Prefecture in southeastern Yunnan. It borders Luxi County, Yunnan and Qiubei County to the east, Jianshui County and Huaning County to the west, Kaiyuan, Yunnan to the south, and Yiliang County, Kunming and Shilin County to the north.

== Administrative divisions ==
At present, Mile City has 10 towns and 2 townships.

10 towns

- Miyang (弥阳镇)
- Xinshao (新哨镇)
- Hongxi (虹溪镇)
- Zhuyuan (竹园镇)
- Pengpu (朋普镇)
- Xunjiansi (巡检司镇)
- Xiyi (西一镇)
- Xier (西二镇)
- Xisan (西三镇)
- Dongshan (东山镇)

2 townships

- Wushan (五山乡)
- Jiangbian (江边乡)

== Demographics ==
Mile has a population of 570,100 as of 2021, including 44.9% ethnic minorities.

== Ethnic groups ==
The Mile County Gazetteer 弥勒县志 (1987:689-699) reports the following Yi subgroups.

- Axi 阿细 (Xishan Yi)
- Azhe 阿哲: in Wushan 五山, Xunjian 巡检, and Jianbian 江边 districts
- Awu 阿乌: 8,710 persons as of 1984
- Black Yi 黑彝: in Wushan 五山, Xishan 西山, and Dongshan 东山 districts
  - Large Black Yi 大黑彝 subgroup (autonym: Nasubo 纳苏波)
  - Small Black Yi 小黑彝 subgroup
- Sani 撒尼 (autonym: Sanibo 撒尼波)
- White Yi 白彝
  - Nasubo 纳苏波 subgroup: in Dongshan 东山 and Xinshao 新哨 districts
  - White Yi 白彝 subgroup: in Xier District 西二区
- Gebo 葛波 (exonym: Guzu 古族)

The local Yi people have a ceremony to worship their fire god once a year.

== Climate ==
Climate data for Mile City, elevation 1,416 m (4,646 ft), (1991–2020 normals, extremes 1981–2010)
Month	Jan	Feb	Mar	Apr	May	Jun	Jul	Aug	Sep	Oct	Nov	Dec	Year
Record high °C (°F)	27.0 (80.6)	29.6 (85.3)	32.2 (90.0)	35.0 (95.0)	35.8 (96.4)	34.1 (93.4)	33.5 (92.3)	32.4 (90.3)	33.2 (91.8)	30.5 (86.9)	28.5 (83.3)	26.0 (78.8)	35.8 (96.4)
Mean daily maximum °C (°F)	18.1 (64.6)	20.9 (69.6)	25.0 (77.0)	27.9 (82.2)	28.5 (83.3)	27.9 (82.2)	27.4 (81.3)	27.5 (81.5)	26.5 (79.7)	23.7 (74.7)	21.1 (70.0)	17.7 (63.9)	24.3 (75.8)
Daily mean °C (°F)	10.3 (50.5)	12.5 (54.5)	16.4 (61.5)	20.0 (68.0)	22.2 (72.0)	22.9 (73.2)	22.6 (72.7)	22.2 (72.0)	20.9 (69.6)	18.2 (64.8)	14.2 (57.6)	10.7 (51.3)	17.8 (64.0)
Mean daily minimum °C (°F)	4.7 (40.5)	6.0 (42.8)	9.5 (49.1)	13.3 (55.9)	17.1 (62.8)	19.3 (66.7)	19.3 (66.7)	18.7 (65.7)	17.2 (63.0)	14.6 (58.3)	9.4 (48.9)	5.8 (42.4)	12.9 (55.2)
Record low °C (°F)	−2.9 (26.8)	−2.8 (27.0)	−3.9 (25.0)	4.4 (39.9)	4.8 (40.6)	12.7 (54.9)	13.8 (56.8)	12.4 (54.3)	8.7 (47.7)	4.7 (40.5)	−1.9 (28.6)	−4.6 (23.7)	−4.6 (23.7)
Average precipitation mm (inches)	26.2 (1.03)	15.4 (0.61)	22.2 (0.87)	34.3 (1.35)	95.3 (3.75)	173.2 (6.82)	187.4 (7.38)	137.3 (5.41)	92.2 (3.63)	73.6 (2.90)	32.3 (1.27)	16.0 (0.63)	905.4 (35.65)
Average precipitation days (≥ 0.1 mm)	5.4	4.7	5.2	7.2	12.2	15.5	18.7	17.7	13.1	12.2	5.8	4.5	122.2
Average snowy days	0.7	0.3	0	0	0	0	0	0	0	0	0	0.1	1.1
Average relative humidity (%)	73	65	60	59	65	76	81	81	78	78	76	76	72
Mean monthly sunshine hours	166.8	178.1	207.7	214.0	196.5	141.2	131.2	146.9	131.7	126.5	160.8	148.5	1,949.9
Percentage possible sunshine	50	56	56	56	48	35	32	37	36	36	49	45	45
Source: China Meteorological Administration
