= Xinhua Township, Guizhou =

Xinhua Township 新华乡
- Township
- Interactive map of Xinhua Township
- Coordinates: 26°23′13″N 105°28′01″E
- Country: People's Republic of China
- Province: Guizhou
- Prefecture-level city: Liupanshui
- District: Liuzhi
- Village-level divisions: 1 residential community 9 villages
- Elevation: 1,436 m (4,711 ft)
- Time zone: UTC+8 (China Standard)
- Area code: 0858

Xinhua Township (simplified Chinese: 新华乡; traditional Chinese: 新華鄉; pinyin: Xīnhuá Xiāng; lit. 'new China') is a township of Liuzhi Special District, Liupanshui, Guizhou, People's Republic of China, located more than 65 kilometres (40 mi) south-southeast of downtown. As of 2011, it has one residential community (居委会) and nine villages under its administration.

== See also ==
- List of township-level divisions of Guizhou
