= Jiucheng, Xinji =

Jiucheng 旧城镇
- Town
- Location in Hebei
- Coordinates: 38°00′06″N 115°22′57″E
- Country: People's Republic of China
- Province: Hebei
- Prefecture-level city: Shijiazhuang
- County-level city: Xinji
- Village-level divisions: 33 villages
- Elevation: 33 m (108 ft)
- Time zone: UTC+8 (China Standard)
- Postal code: 052200
- Area code: 0311

Jiucheng (simplified Chinese: 旧城; traditional Chinese: 舊城; pinyin: Jiùchéng; lit. 'old city') is a town of Xinji City in southern Hebei province, China, located 16 kilometres (9.9 mi) northeast of downtown Xinji and in between G1811 Huanghua–Shijiazhuang Expressway and China National Highway 107. As of 2011, it has 33 villages under its administration.

== See also ==
- List of township-level divisions of Hebei
