= Jiucheng, Honghe =

Jiucheng 旧城镇
- Town
- Location in Yunnan
- Coordinates: 24°37′44″N 103°40′11″E
- Country: People's Republic of China
- Province: Yunnan
- Autonomous prefecture: Honghe
- County: Luxi
- Elevation: 1,821 m (5,974 ft)
- Time zone: UTC+8 (China Standard)
- Area code: 0873

Jiucheng (simplified Chinese: 旧城; traditional Chinese: 舊城; pinyin: Jiùchéng; lit. 'old city') is a town of Luxi County in the northeastern reaches of the Honghe Hani and Yi Autonomous Prefecture in eastern Yunnan province, China, located (as the crow flies) around 14 kilometres (8.7 mi) northwest of the county seat, 143 km (89 mi) north-northeast of Mengzi City and about 90 km (56 mi) east-southeast of Kunming. As of 2011, it has 11 villages under its administration.
