= Luxi County, Yunnan =

Luxi County 泸西县
- County
- Location of Luxi County in Honghe Prefecture within Yunnan province

- Location of the seat in Yunnan
- Coordinates: 24°31′55″N 103°45′58″E
- Country: People's Republic of China
- Province: Yunnan
- Prefecture: Honghe

Area
  - Total: 1,674 km^{2} (646 sq mi)

Population
  - Total: 370,000
  - Density: 220/km^{2} (570/sq mi)
- Time zone: UTC+8 (CST)
- Postal code: 652400
- Area code: 0873
- Website: www.hhlx.gov.cn

Luxi County (simplified Chinese: 泸西县; traditional Chinese: 瀘西縣; pinyin: Lúxī Xiàn) is located in Honghe Hani and Yi Autonomous Prefecture, Yunnan province, China. Luxi was the capital of the medieval Yi Ziqi Kingdom.

Luxi County borders Qiubei County across the Nanpan River to the southeast, Shizong County to the northeast, Luliang County and Shilin County to the northwest, and Mile City to the south.

== Administrative divisions ==
In the present, Luxi County has 5 towns and 3 townships.

5 towns

- Zhongshu (中枢镇)
- Jinma (金马镇)
- Jiucheng (旧城镇)
- Wujiepu (午街铺镇)
- Baishui (白水镇)

3 townships

- Xiangyang (向阳乡)
- Santang (三塘乡)
- Yongning (永宁乡)

== Ethnic groups ==
There are five ethnic Yi subgroups in Luxi County, namely White Yi 白彝, Sani 撒尼, Black Yi 黑彝, Awu 阿乌, and Dry Yi 干彝, with the Dry Yi living mostly in Xiaobai Shitou 小白石头 and Baishui Wunaibai 白水吾乃白 of Jinma Town 金马镇.

== Climate ==
Climate data for Luxi, elevation 1,704 m (5,591 ft), (1991–2020 normals, extremes 1981–present)
| Month | Jan | Feb | Mar | Apr | May | Jun | Jul | Aug | Sep | Oct | Nov | Dec | Year |
|---|---|---|---|---|---|---|---|---|---|---|---|---|---|
| Record high °C (°F) | 24.2 (75.6) | 27.5 (81.5) | 29.8 (85.6) | 33.2 (91.8) | 34.1 (93.4) | 31.6 (88.9) | 31.2 (88.2) | 30.6 (87.1) | 31.1 (88.0) | 28.6 (83.5) | 27.3 (81.1) | 24.7 (76.5) | 34.1 (93.4) |
| Mean daily maximum °C (°F) | 15.3 (59.5) | 18.0 (64.4) | 22.4 (72.3) | 25.5 (77.9) | 26.3 (79.3) | 26.0 (78.8) | 25.5 (77.9) | 25.5 (77.9) | 24.2 (75.6) | 21.4 (70.5) | 18.7 (65.7) | 15.2 (59.4) | 22.0 (71.6) |
| Daily mean °C (°F) | 8.0 (46.4) | 10.1 (50.2) | 14.0 (57.2) | 17.6 (63.7) | 19.9 (67.8) | 20.9 (69.6) | 20.6 (69.1) | 20.1 (68.2) | 18.6 (65.5) | 15.9 (60.6) | 12.1 (53.8) | 8.5 (47.3) | 15.5 (60.0) |
| Mean daily minimum °C (°F) | 3.2 (37.8) | 4.5 (40.1) | 7.7 (45.9) | 11.4 (52.5) | 15.1 (59.2) | 17.5 (63.5) | 17.5 (63.5) | 16.8 (62.2) | 15.2 (59.4) | 12.7 (54.9) | 7.7 (45.9) | 4.1 (39.4) | 11.1 (52.0) |
| Record low °C (°F) | −5.8 (21.6) | −3.4 (25.9) | −5.9 (21.4) | 2.2 (36.0) | 3.5 (38.3) | 10.2 (50.4) | 12.1 (53.8) | 10.2 (50.4) | 6.2 (43.2) | 2.5 (36.5) | −4.3 (24.3) | −11.3 (11.7) | −11.3 (11.7) |
| Average precipitation mm (inches) | 26.1 (1.03) | 17.9 (0.70) | 24.9 (0.98) | 33.9 (1.33) | 83.8 (3.30) | 161.2 (6.35) | 175.1 (6.89) | 141.5 (5.57) | 84.3 (3.32) | 65.3 (2.57) | 28.4 (1.12) | 16.0 (0.63) | 858.4 (33.79) |
| Average precipitation days (≥ 0.1 mm) | 7.3 | 6.1 | 5.9 | 7.3 | 12.1 | 16.0 | 18.9 | 18.5 | 13.2 | 11.4 | 5.8 | 5.0 | 127.5 |
| Average snowy days | 1.6 | 0.9 | 0.2 | 0 | 0 | 0 | 0 | 0 | 0 | 0 | 0.1 | 0.3 | 3.1 |
| Average relative humidity (%) | 77 | 71 | 65 | 64 | 69 | 79 | 83 | 84 | 82 | 82 | 80 | 80 | 76 |
| Mean monthly sunshine hours | 178.8 | 188.9 | 226.3 | 236.5 | 208.7 | 136.6 | 126.1 | 141.5 | 130.1 | 126.7 | 166.7 | 160.2 | 2,027.1 |
| Percentage possible sunshine | 53 | 59 | 61 | 62 | 51 | 34 | 30 | 35 | 36 | 36 | 51 | 49 | 46 |
Source: China Meteorological Administrationall-time November record
