= Jiucheng, Weixin County =

Jiucheng 旧城镇
- Town
- Location in Yunnan
- Coordinates: 28°01′26″N 105°03′15″E
- Country: People's Republic of China
- Province: Yunnan
- Prefecture-level city: Zhaotong
- County: Weixin
- Elevation: 597 m (1,959 ft)
- Time zone: UTC+8 (China Standard)

Jiucheng (simplified Chinese: 旧城; traditional Chinese: 舊城; pinyin: Jiùchéng; lit. 'old city') is a town of Weixin County in northeastern Yunnan province, China, located (as the crow flies) less than 7 kilometres (4.3 mi) from the border with Sichuan, 20 km (12 mi) north of the county seat, and 152 km (94 mi) northeast of Zhaotong at an elevation of only 597 m (1,959 ft). As of 2011, it has 20 villages under its administration.
