= Shijie Yi Ethnic Township =

Coordinates: 24.5023°N 102.1596°E

Shijie Yi Ethnic Township (十街彝族乡) is a Yi ethnic township in Yimen County, Yunnan, China.
