= Xinhua Township, Tengchong County =

Xinhua Township 新华乡
- Township
- Location in Yunnan
- Coordinates: 24°45′15″N 98°29′01″E
- Country: People's Republic of China
- Province: Yunnan
- Prefecture-level city: Baoshan
- County: Tengchong
- Village-level divisions: 11 villages
- Elevation: 1,303 m (4,275 ft)
- Time zone: UTC+8 (China Standard)

Xinhua Township (simplified Chinese: 新华乡; traditional Chinese: 新華鄉; pinyin: Xīnhuá Xiāng; lit. 'new China') is a township of Tengchong County in western Yunnan province, China, located about 30 kilometres (19 mi) south of the county seat and 79 km (49 mi) southwest of Baoshan as the crow flies. As of 2011, it has 11 villages under its administration.
