= Xinhua Township, Yuanmou County =

Xinhua Township 新华乡
- Township
- Location in Yunnan
- Coordinates: 25°43′01″N 101°40′15″E
- Country: People's Republic of China
- Province: Yunnan
- Autonomous prefecture: Chuxiong
- County: Yuanmou
- Village-level divisions: 4 villages
- Elevation: 1,519 m (4,984 ft)
- Time zone: UTC+8 (China Standard)
- Area code: 0878

Xinhua Township (simplified Chinese: 新华乡; traditional Chinese: 新華鄉; pinyin: Xīnhuá Xiāng; lit. 'new China') is a township of Yuanmou County in north-central Yunnan province, China, located about 20 kilometres (12 mi) due west of the county seat and 75 km (47 mi) north-northeast of Chuxiong City as the crow flies. As of 2011, it has four villages under its administration.
