= Xinhua, Wenshan =

Xinhua 新华镇
- Town
- Location in Yunnan
- Coordinates: 23°37′27″N 105°37′22″E
- Country: People's Republic of China
- Province: Yunnan
- Autonomous prefecture: Wenshan
- County: Funing
- Village-level divisions: 3 residential communities 9 villages
- Elevation: 691 m (2,267 ft)
- Time zone: UTC+8 (China Standard)
- Area code: 0876

Xinhua (simplified Chinese: 新华; traditional Chinese: 新華; pinyin: Xīnhuá; lit. 'new China') is a town of Funing County in southeastern Yunnan province, China, located in the immediate vicinity of the county seat some 143 kilometres (89 mi) east-northeast of Wenshan City; G80 Guangzhou–Kunming Expressway and China National Highway 323. As of 2011, it has three residential communities (社区) and nine villages under its administration.
