= Jiucheng Township, Yunnan =

Jiucheng Township 旧城乡
- Township
- Location in Yunnan
- Coordinates: 24°25′14″N 99°14′24″E
- Country: People's Republic of China
- Province: Yunnan
- Prefecture-level city: Baoshan
- County: Shidian
- Elevation: 664 m (2,178 ft)
- Time zone: UTC+8 (China Standard)

Jiucheng Township (simplified Chinese: 旧城乡; traditional Chinese: 舊城鄉; pinyin: Jiùchéng Xiāng; lit. 'old city') is a township of Shidian County in western Yunnan province, China, located 34 kilometres (21 mi) south of the county seat and 76 km (47 mi) south of Baoshan as the crow flies. As of 2011, it has 8 villages under its administration.
