= Dajie, Jiangchuan County =

Huaxi Town 大街镇
- Township
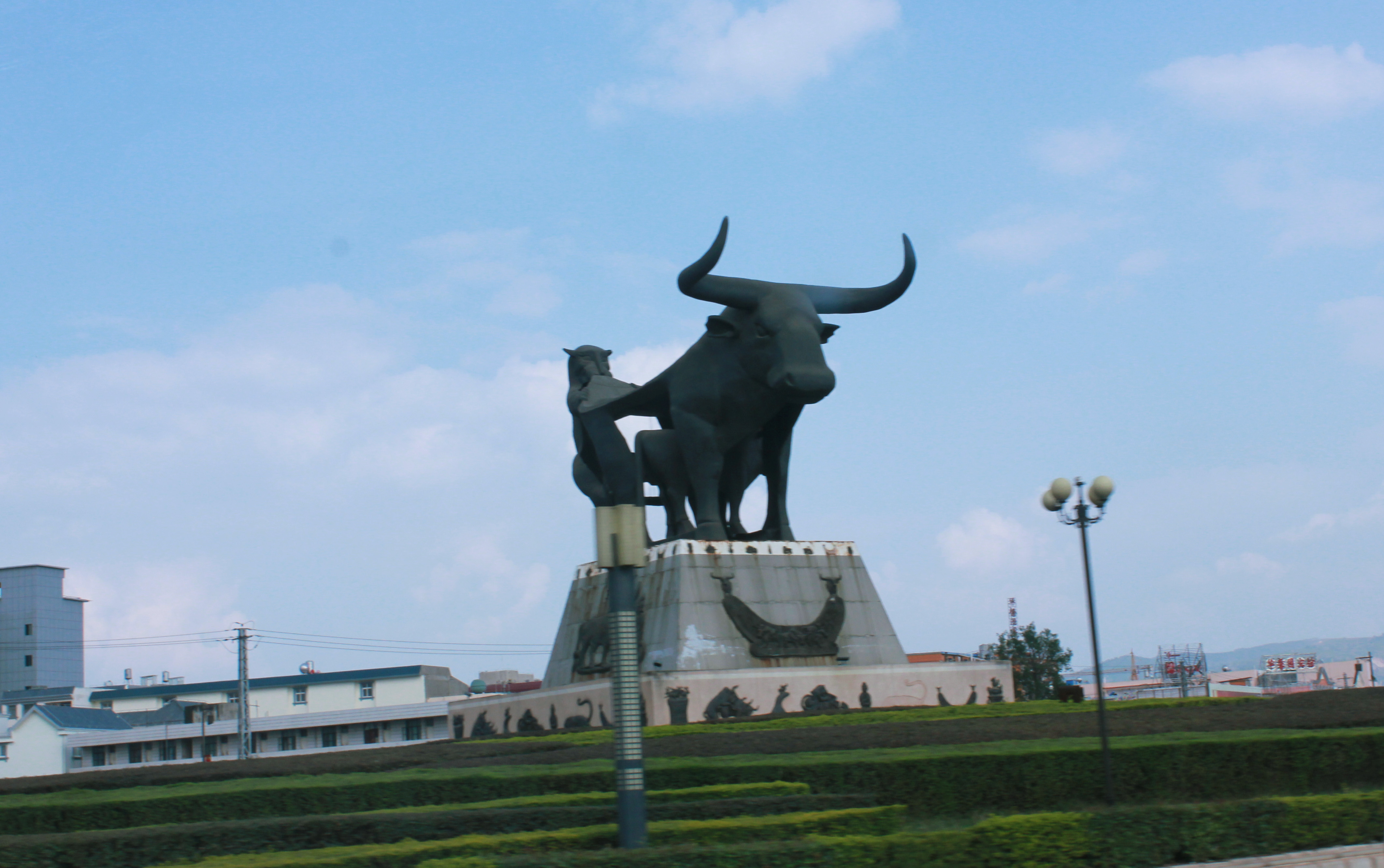

- Location within Yunnan
- Coordinates: 24°19′04″N 102°45′11″E
- Country: China
- Province: Yunnan
- Prefecture: Yuxi
- County: Jiangchuan

Area
  - Total: 97.074 km^{2} (37.480 sq mi)

Population
  - Total: 77,822
  - Density: 801.68/km^{2} (2,076.3/sq mi)
- Time zone: UTC+8 (China Standard)
- Postal code: 652600
- Area code: 0877
- Website: http://www.ynf.gov.cn/zmb/index.aspx?departmentid=5315

Dajie Town (simplified Chinese: 大街镇; traditional Chinese: 大街鎮; pinyin: Dàjiē Zhèn) is a town and the county seat of Jiangchuan County in Yunnan province of Southwest China.
