= Xinji =

Xinji 辛集市
- County-level & Sub-prefectural city
- Location of the city center in Hebei
- Coordinates: 37°56′35″N 115°13′05″E
- Country: People's Republic of China
- Province: Hebei
- Prefecture-level city: Shijiazhuang

Area
  - County-level & Sub-prefectural city: 951.0 km^{2} (367.2 sq mi)

Population (2020)
  - County-level & Sub-prefectural city: 594,628
  - Urban: 368,208
- Time zone: UTC+8 (China Standard)
- Licence plate prefixes: 冀AF

Xinji (Chinese: 辛集; pinyin: Xīnjí) is a county-level city of Hebei Province, North China, under the administration of the prefecture-level city of Shijiazhuang, the provincial capital. It is the easternmost county-level division of Shijiazhuang. There are eight towns (镇; zhèn) and seven townships (乡; xiāng) under the administration of Xinji. Xinji's main industry is leather. Xinji is located in North China, and the air pollution is a serious concern, especially during the heating period in winter, the concentration of PM2.5 exceeds the national standard limits.

== Geography ==
- Population: The population is 594,628 in the year 2020.
- Area: 951 km^{2}
  - Latitude: about 38° N
  - Longitude: about 115° E
- Area code: +86+311
- Post Code: 052360

=== Administrative divisions ===
Xinji City is sub-divided into 8 towns and 7 townships within its jurisdiction.

Towns:

- Xinji (辛集镇), Zhangguzhuang (张古庄镇), Weibo (位伯镇), Jiucheng (旧城镇), Xinleitou (新垒头镇), Xincheng (新城镇), Nanzhiqiong (南智邱镇), Wangkou (王口镇)

Townships:

- Xiaoxinzhuang Township (小辛庄乡), Zhonglixiang Township (中里厢乡), Tiangongying Township (天宫营乡), Qianying Township (前营乡), Hemujing Township (和睦井乡), Tianjiazhuang Township (田家庄乡), Mazhuang Township (马庄乡)

== Climate ==
Climate data for Xinji, elevation 36 m (118 ft), (1991–2020 normals, extremes 1981–2010)
Month	Jan	Feb	Mar	Apr	May	Jun	Jul	Aug	Sep	Oct	Nov	Dec	Year
Record high °C (°F)	17.0 (62.6)	24.2 (75.6)	32.0 (89.6)	34.0 (93.2)	39.6 (103.3)	41.0 (105.8)	42.9 (109.2)	37.2 (99.0)	36.5 (97.7)	33.2 (91.8)	26.4 (79.5)	19.8 (67.6)	42.9 (109.2)
Mean daily maximum °C (°F)	3.5 (38.3)	7.7 (45.9)	14.9 (58.8)	22.1 (71.8)	27.8 (82.0)	32.4 (90.3)	32.7 (90.9)	30.9 (87.6)	27.1 (80.8)	21.0 (69.8)	11.7 (53.1)	4.8 (40.6)	19.7 (67.5)
Daily mean °C (°F)	−1.7 (28.9)	2.0 (35.6)	8.6 (47.5)	15.6 (60.1)	21.6 (70.9)	26.4 (79.5)	27.8 (82.0)	26.2 (79.2)	21.6 (70.9)	14.8 (58.6)	6.3 (43.3)	−0.1 (31.8)	14.1 (57.4)
Mean daily minimum °C (°F)	−5.8 (21.6)	−2.5 (27.5)	3.4 (38.1)	10.0 (50.0)	15.9 (60.6)	21.0 (69.8)	23.6 (74.5)	22.3 (72.1)	17.0 (62.6)	9.9 (49.8)	2.1 (35.8)	−3.8 (25.2)	9.4 (49.0)
Record low °C (°F)	−16.9 (1.6)	−15.0 (5.0)	−7.5 (18.5)	−0.9 (30.4)	5.1 (41.2)	10.8 (51.4)	16.6 (61.9)	14.1 (57.4)	6.5 (43.7)	−1.5 (29.3)	−12.2 (10.0)	−19.0 (−2.2)	−19.0 (−2.2)
Average precipitation mm (inches)	1.8 (0.07)	5.4 (0.21)	8.3 (0.33)	26.2 (1.03)	38.0 (1.50)	50.1 (1.97)	122.3 (4.81)	117.6 (4.63)	44.5 (1.75)	26.4 (1.04)	14.3 (0.56)	3.1 (0.12)	458 (18.02)
Average precipitation days (≥ 0.1 mm)	1.7	2.3	2.5	4.9	6.2	8.0	10.8	9.5	6.4	4.9	3.6	1.9	62.7
Average snowy days	2.4	2.4	0.8	0.2	0	0	0	0	0	0	1.1	2.1	9
Average relative humidity (%)	55	51	49	53	55	57	71	75	68	62	63	59	60
Mean monthly sunshine hours	169	175.8	227.8	246.9	280.8	246.2	224.2	219.7	208.1	198.6	167.2	160.8	2,525.1
Percentage possible sunshine	55	57	61	62	64	56	50	53	56	58	56	55	57
Source: China Meteorological Administration

== History ==
Xinji was formerly named Shulu County (Chinese: 束鹿县; pinyin: Shùlù Xiàn), and became a county-level city in 1986.
