= Xinhua Township, Pingbian County =

Xinhua Township 新华乡
- Township
- Location in Yunnan
- Coordinates: 23°15′24″N 103°41′44″E
- Country: People's Republic of China
- Province: Yunnan
- Autonomous prefecture: Honghe
- County: Pingbian
- Village-level divisions: 9 villages
- Elevation: 1,796 m (5,892 ft)
- Time zone: UTC+8 (China Standard)
- Area code: 0873

Xinhua Township (simplified Chinese: 新华乡; traditional Chinese: 新華鄉; pinyin: Xīnhuá Xiāng; lit. 'new China') is a township of Pingbian County in southeastern Yunnan province, China, located 29 kilometres (18 mi) north of the county seat and 35 km (22 mi) east-southeast of Mengzi City as the crow flies. As of 2011, it has nine villages under its administration.
