= Xinhua Yi and Miao Ethnic Township =

Xinhua Yi and Miao Ethnic Township 新华彝族苗族乡
- Ethnic township
- Location in Yunnan
- Coordinates: 24°52′18″N 100°04′31″E
- Country: People's Republic of China
- Province: Yunnan
- Prefecture-level city: Lincang
- County: Fengqing
- Village-level divisions: 11 villages
- Elevation: 2,190 m (7,190 ft)
- Time zone: UTC+8 (China Standard)
- Area code: 0883

Xinhua Yi and Miao Ethnic Township (simplified Chinese: 新华彝族苗族乡; traditional Chinese: 新華彝族苗族鄉; pinyin: Xīnhuá Yízú Miáozú Xiāng; lit. 'new China') is a township of Fengqing County in western Yunnan province, China, located about 35 kilometres (22 mi) northeast of the county seat and 108 km (67 mi) due north of Lincang as the crow flies. As of 2011, it has 11 villages under its administration.
