= Azhe language =

Loloish language of China

Azhe
- Pronunciation: [a˨˩dʐɛ˨pʰo˨˩]
- Native to: China
- Ethnicity: Yi
- Native speakers: ca. 54,000 (2007)
- Language family: Sino-Tibetan: Lolo-Burmese; Loloish; Southeastern; Sani–Azha; Azhe

Language codes
- ISO 639-3: yiz
- Glottolog: azhe1235

Azhe (Chinese: 阿哲; Azhepo; autonym: [a21 dʐɛ22 pʰo21]) is one of the Loloish languages spoken by the Yi people of China.

== Dialects ==
Wang Chengyou (王成有) (2003:210) lists 3 dialects of Azhe, which are all mutually intelligible.

- Wushan 五山土语 (in Mile County 弥勒县)
  - Xunjian 巡检, Mile County 弥勒县
  - Hongxi 虹溪, Mile County 弥勒县
  - Panxi 盘溪, Huaning County 华宁县
- Jiangbian 江边土语 (in Mile County 弥勒县)
- Qujiang 曲江土语 (in Jianshui County 建水县)

Azhe is spoken in Mile, Huaning, Kaiyuan, and Jianshui counties, with about 100,000 speakers.
