= Gexin =

Gexin may refer to:

- Chen Gexin (陳歌辛; 1914–1961), Chinese pop music artist of Indian descent
- Gexin Avenue Subdistrict (革新街街道), Yuhua District, Shijiazhuang, China
- Gexin movement (simplified Chinese: 党政革新运动; traditional Chinese: 黨政革新運動; pinyin: Dǎng zhèng géxīn yùndòng), a political faction of China's KMT founded in 1944.
- Gexin Subdistrict, Harbin (革新街道), in Nangang District, Harbin, China
