= Beiyuan =

Beiyuan may refer to the following locations in China:

== Area ==
- Beiyuan, Chaoyang District, Beijing, an area in Laiguangying, Chaoyang District, Beijing

== Subdistricts ==
- Beiyuan Subdistrict, Beijing, in Tongzhou District, Beijing
- Beiyuan Subdistrict, Shijiazhuang, in Xinhua District, Shijiazhuang, Hebei
- Beiyuan Subdistrict, Jinan (北园街道), in Tianqiao District, Jinan, Shandong
- Beiyuan Subdistrict, Fuxin, in Xihe District, Fuxin, Liaoning
- Beiyuan Subdistrict, Weifang, in Kuiwen District, Weifang, Shandong
- Beiyuan Subdistrict, Yiwu, in Yiwu, Zhejiang

== See also ==
- Northern Yuan (1368–1635), or Bei Yuan, a Mongolian dynasty
- Beiyuan station (disambiguation), multiple stations with Beiyuan in its name
