= Sanzhuang =

Sanzhuang (Chinese: 三庄) could refer to the following locations in China:

- Sanzhuang Township, Hebei, in Xinhua District, Shijiazhuang, Hebei, China
- Sanzhuang Township, Jiangsu, in Siyang County, Jiangsu, China
- Sanzhuang, Shandong, town in Donggang District, Rizhao, Shandong, China
