= Dongjiao =

Dongjiao may refer to the following locations in China:

- Dongjiao Subdistrict, Tongling (东郊街道), in Shizishan District, Tongling, Anhui
- Dongjiao Subdistrict, Shijiazhuang (东焦街道), in Xinhua District, Shijiazhuang, Hebei
- Dongjiao Subdistrict, Guangzhou (东漖街道), in Liwan District, Guangzhou, Guangdong
- Dongjiao Subdistrict, Ningbo (东郊街道), in Jiangdong District, Ningbo, Zhejiang
- Dongjiao, Putian (东峤镇), in Xiuyu District, Putian, Fujian
- Dongjiao, Wenchang (东郊镇), town in Hainan
