= Beat Holdings =

Hong Kong company, former news agency

- Formerly: Xinhua Finance; Xinhua Holdings
- Type: Public
- Traded as: TYO: 9399
- ISIN: KYG9827X1025
- Industry: Finance
- Predecessor: Xinhua Financial Network
Founded
17 November 1999 in Hong Kong	(XFN)
5 January 2004 in Cayman Islands	(Xinhua Finance)
- Founder: Fredy Bush
- Headquarters: Hong Kong, China; Cayman Islands (registered office)
- Key people: GEN MATSUDA (Chairman & CEO)
- Net income: ▼ (US$4.165 million) (2015)
- Total assets: ▲US$19.603 million (2015)
- Total equity: ▲US$11.842 million (2015)
- Owner: Lian Yihhann (35.42%); Lai Mankon (14.80%); Lie Wanchie (10.10%)
- Number of employees: 79 (2015)
- Website: beatholdings.com
- Footnotes in a consolidated basis

Beat Holdings Limited (Chinese: 貝德控股有限公司, Japanese: ビート・ホールディングス・リミテッド), formerly known as Xinhua Holdings Limited (Chinese: 新华控股有限公司; Japanese: ファイナンス・リミテッド) and Xinhua Finance, is a company founded in 1999. It is headquartered in Hong Kong, listed on the Tokyo Standard Board (9399), and is engaged in the provision of financial information and services, primarily in the Chinese market. The company's subsidiary, Xinhua Finance Media Ltd, was listed on NASDAQ (Nasdaq: XFML), but was unlisted in 2011 after the exposure of a scandal.

Xinhua News Agency owned a stake in Xinhua Finance of 3.45% in February 2006. However, the state-owned news agency had sold all of its stake prior to 2007. The agency stated in a press release in 2007 that they have no relation to Xinhua Finance.

In 2013, former CEO Loretta Fredy Bush, as well as former board members Shelly S. Singhal and Dennis L. Pelino, were charged with and sentenced for conspiracy to impede the lawful functions of the Internal Revenue Service. This was in connection with them being charged with engaging in a conspiracy to defraud the SEC and Xinhua Finance.

== History ==
old logo

Xinhua Financial Network Limited (XFN) was incorporated in Hong Kong in November 1999, by a Samoa incorporated company "Xinhua Finance Holdings Limited". In late 2000, XFN established a joint venture with FTSE Group, forming the Xinhua-FTSE Index Series (for example FTSE China A50 Index). In 2004, a Cayman Islands incorporated holding company Xinhua Finance Limited was formed.

In 2003, it formed an international alliance with Agence France-Presse (AFP) Finance. Xinhua Financial Network Ltd. purchased the news agencies of AFP Asian Finance in Hong Kong, Japan, South Korea, and Singapore and eight other Asian countries and regions, which expanded the coverage of Xinhua News Agency's international network.

In July 2006, Mergent, a subsidiary of Xinhua Finance, purchased the business of Praedea Solutions, Inc., a developer of enterprise software for automated data extraction.

In June 2007, XFN announced it had agreed to sell seven of its Asia-Pacific news bureaus in Tokyo, Manila, Jakarta, Kuala Lumpur, Singapore, Sydney and Seoul to Thomson Financial, part of Canadian publisher Thomson Corp., to focus on the greater China region. XFN stated they would retain their operations in Beijing, Shanghai, Hong Kong and Taipei, while news operations of Xinhua Finance's other subsidiaries, including Market News International and Stone & McCarthy Research Associates would also not change. Financial terms were not disclosed.

In 2010 the Hong Kong incorporated Xinhua/FTSE Limited was sold to FTSE Group.

== Shareholders ==
The shareholders of Xinhua Holdings used private equity funds and offshore companies to hide the true ownership structure. Although Xinhua News Agency did declared subsidiaries owned equity stakes in Xinhua Finance before 2007, the agency did not disclosed the full detail either, but announcing they did not have any stake any more from 2007 and any new business relationship between Xinhua Finance and the agency must under the law.

In 2001 Samoa-incorporated company "Xinhua Finance Holdings Limited" owned a majority stake in Xinhua Financial Network, which all the shares of Xinhua Financial Network were exchanged with the shares of Xinhua Finance in 2004. According to Xinhua Finance, as at 30 September 2005, Patriarch Partners, a fund of Lynn Tilton, owned Xinhua Finance 9.92% as the largest shareholder; it was followed by co-founder Fredy Bush for 6.64% stake; and British Virgin Islands incorporated Xinhua Development Holdings Limited for 4.25% stake. According to 2006 filing, Xinhua Development Holdings hold the shares for and on behalf of China Media Development Shenzhen, which was a wholly owned subsidiary of Xinhua News Agency.
