= XSEL =

XSEL may refer to:

- Clipboard_(computing)#X Window_System
- XSEL (expert system)
- Xinhua Sports & Entertainment
