= Wuqi =

Wuqi can refer to:

== China ==
- Wuqi County, a county in Yan'an, Shaanxi, China
- Wuqi Subdistrict, a township-level division of Xinhua District, Shijiazhuang, Hebei, China

== Taiwan ==
- Wuqi District, an urban township in Taichung County, Taiwan
