= Sheila Robinson =

Sheila Robinson may refer to:

- Sheila Radley, a pseudonym of Sheila Robinson, British mystery novelist
- Sheila Robinson (artist), a British artist
- Sheila Robinson (publisher), a businesswoman and magazine founder
