= MNI =

The abbreviation MNI, mni or M.N.I. may stand for:

- Malaysian Newsprint Industries, a Malaysian pulp and paper company
- Market News International, international capital markets news website
- Member of the Nautical Institute of the United Kingdom
- Miami Network Interface, an API for Amiga computers
- Minimum number of individuals that a cluster of bones may belong to
- Ministry of National Integration, a department of the government of Brazil
- mni, ISO 639-2 and ISO 639-3 code for the Meitei language of Manipur
- John A. Osborne Airport, Montserrat, IATA code
- Montreal Neurological Institute and Hospital, Canada
  - MNI template, a brain template used for registration developed and named after the institute
- MuggleNet Interactive, a website for Harry Potter fans
- My Name Is, a 1999 single by Eminem
