= Diversity Woman =

- Editor: Jackie Krentzman
- Design Director: Cathy Krizik
- Categories: Business, Diversity
- Publisher: Sheila Robinson
- Total circulation (2013): 100,000
- Founded: 2007
- Country: United States
- Based in: Burlington, NC
- Language: English
- Website: diversitywoman.com

Diversity Woman magazine (commonly referred to as DW), founded in 2007, is an American business magazine that features original articles about entrepreneurship, career development, technology, finance, health, and diversity issues as they relate to women in the business world, spotlighting success stories of business women of all races. With a current circulation of approximately 100,000, the motto of DW is “Leadership empowerment for women who mean business.”

== Conferences ==
Diversity Woman magazine sponsors yearly conferences, with the 8th annual conference being held in Washington D.C. in October 2013, under the theme “Mentors, Sponsors and Breaking the Glass Ceiling Through Our Allies”. Each conference features an array of speakers, and culminates with the presentation of the Mosaic Woman Awards. Past honorees have included such respected figures as Maya Angelou, Soledad O’Brien, Darla K. Anderson, and Lynn Tilton.

== Publisher ==
The Publisher of DW, Sheila A. Robinson was named in 2009 as one of the Top 50 Women in Magazine Publishing by Publishing Executive (featured on the cover of the June issue). Robinson was also the keynote speaker at the 2008 wives luncheon at the NFL Pro Bowl, and was nominated for the 2011 North Carolina Small Business of The Year. Robinson’s first book, Lead By Example is due out April 1, 2014. Before launching Diversity Woman, Robinson was the publisher of the regional magazine North Carolina Career Network Magazine.

== Executive Editor ==
Executive Editor of DW, Jackie Krentzman teaches courses in journalism at Berkley and also produced several documentaries, the first of which, American Jerusalem, would air on PBS in summer 2014.

== Publisher Interview ==
- Media Sheppard - Feb. 21, 2014^{[usurped]}
