= Daguo =

Daguo 大郭镇
- Town
- Location in Hebei
- Coordinates: 38°04′25″N 114°24′11″E
- Country: People's Republic of China
- Province: Hebei
- Prefecture-level city: Shijiazhuang
- District: Xinhua
- Village-level divisions: 4 residential communities 3 villages
- Elevation: 89 m (292 ft)
- Time zone: UTC+8 (China Standard)
- Area code: 0311

Daguo (Chinese: 大郭; pinyin: Dàguō) is a town of Xinhua District in the western part of Shijiazhuang, Hebei, People's Republic of China. As of 2011, it has 4 residential communities and 3 villages under its administration.

== See also ==
- List of township-level divisions of Hebei
