= Xinhua Sports & Entertainment =

Chinese media company

- Formerly: Xinhua Finance Media Limited
- Company type: Public
- Traded as: Nasdaq: XSEL (ADS)
- Industry: Media
- Founded: 2005
- Defunct: 2011
- Fate: liquidated
- Headquarters: Beijing, China (de facto); Grand Cayman, Cayman Islands (registered office)
- Area served: China
- Key people: Zheng Jingsheng (Chairman); Fredy Bush (CEO)
- Revenue: ▼US$99.231 million (2009)
- Operating income: ▼ (US$222.028 million) (2009)
- Net income: ▼ (US$311.575 million) (2009)
- Total assets: ▼US$242.559 million (2009)
- Total equity: ▼ (US$26.170 million) (2009)
- Owner: Patriarch Partners (24.0%); Xinhua Finance (18.7%); Yucaipa (8.7%); Fredy Bush (6.0%)
- Website: XSEL.com
- Footnotes / references in a consolidated basis

Xinhua Sports & Entertainment Limited
- Simplified Chinese: 新华悦动传媒有限公司
Transcriptions

Xinhua Finance Media Limited
- Simplified Chinese: 新華財經传媒有限公司
Transcriptions

Xinhua Sports & Entertainment Limited (XSEL) was a Chinese media company which was delisted in 2011, as well as the arrest of top management of the firm. The company was known as Xinhua Finance Media Limited until 2009.

In 2007 the state-owned enterprise Xinhua News Agency even declared that they have no relation with XSEL's parent company Xinhua Finance.

In 2013 Fredy Bush, former CEO was jailed.

== History ==
Xinhua Finance Media Limited was incorporated in the Cayman Islands on 7 November 2005. The company was listed in NASDAQ in March 2007.

On March 2, 2009, Xinhua Finance Media has changed its name to "Xinhua Sports & Entertainment Limited" (XSEL).

In 2011, follow the exposure of the real financial condition of the company which ended as liquidation, Lynn Tilton sued former friend and CEO of XSEL, Fredy Bush, for fraud.
