= Xiyuan Subdistrict, Shijiazhuang =

Coordinates: 38.04625°N 114.443°E

Xiyuan Subdistrict 西苑街道
- Subdistrict

Chinese transcription(s)
- Interactive map of Xiyuan Subdistrict
- Country: China
- Province: Hebei
- Prefecture: Shijiazhuang
- District: Xinhua District
- Time zone: UTC+8 (China Standard Time)

Xiyuan Subdistrict (Chinese: 西苑街道) is a township-level division of Xinhua District, Shijiazhuang, Hebei, China.

== See also ==
- List of township-level divisions of Hebei
