= Zhaolingpuxi =

Coordinates: 38°05′33″N 114°28′22″E

Zhaolingpuxi 赵陵铺镇
- Town

Chinese transcription(s)
- Interactive map of Zhaolingpuxi
- Country: China
- Province: Hebei
- Prefecture: Shijiazhuang
- District: Xinhua District
- Time zone: UTC+8 (China Standard Time)

Zhaolingpuxi (Chinese: 赵陵铺镇) is a township-level division of Xinhua District, Shijiazhuang, Hebei, China.

== See also ==
- List of township-level divisions of Hebei
