= Stila =

American cosmetics company

Stila logo

Stila Cosmetics is an American cosmetics company founded in 1994. The cosmetics line was created by makeup artist Jeanine Lobell. The name Stila (pronounced STEE-la) was derived from the Swedish word "stil," which can mean "style". Stila's official website is quoted as saying that they chose that name because they believe "every woman’s makeup should be as individual as her own signature". Jeanine Lobell writes on her blog that, "We kind of just made up the name, ‘Stila.’ It sounds sort of like stil in Swedish, which means style." Lobell grew up in Sweden.

Estée Lauder Companies bought Stila in 1999 and sold it to Sun Capital Partners, Inc in the spring of 2006. In 2009, Stila became a Lynn Tilton company when it was sold to the private equity fund Patriarch Partners, LLC.
