= Ning'an Road Subdistrict =

Coordinates: 38.05314°N 114.47514°E

Ning'an Road Subdistrict 宁安路街道
- Subdistrict
- Interactive map of Ning'an Road Subdistrict
- Country: People's Republic of China
- Province: Hebei
- Prefecture: Shijiazhuang
- District: Xinhua District
- Time zone: UTC+8 (China Standard Time)

Ning'an Road Subdistrict (Chinese: 宁安路街道) is a subdistrict of Xinhua District, Shijiazhuang, Hebei, People's Republic of China.

== See also ==
- List of township-level divisions of Hebei
