= Hezuo Road Subdistrict =

Hezuo Road Sub District 合作路街道
- Subdistrict
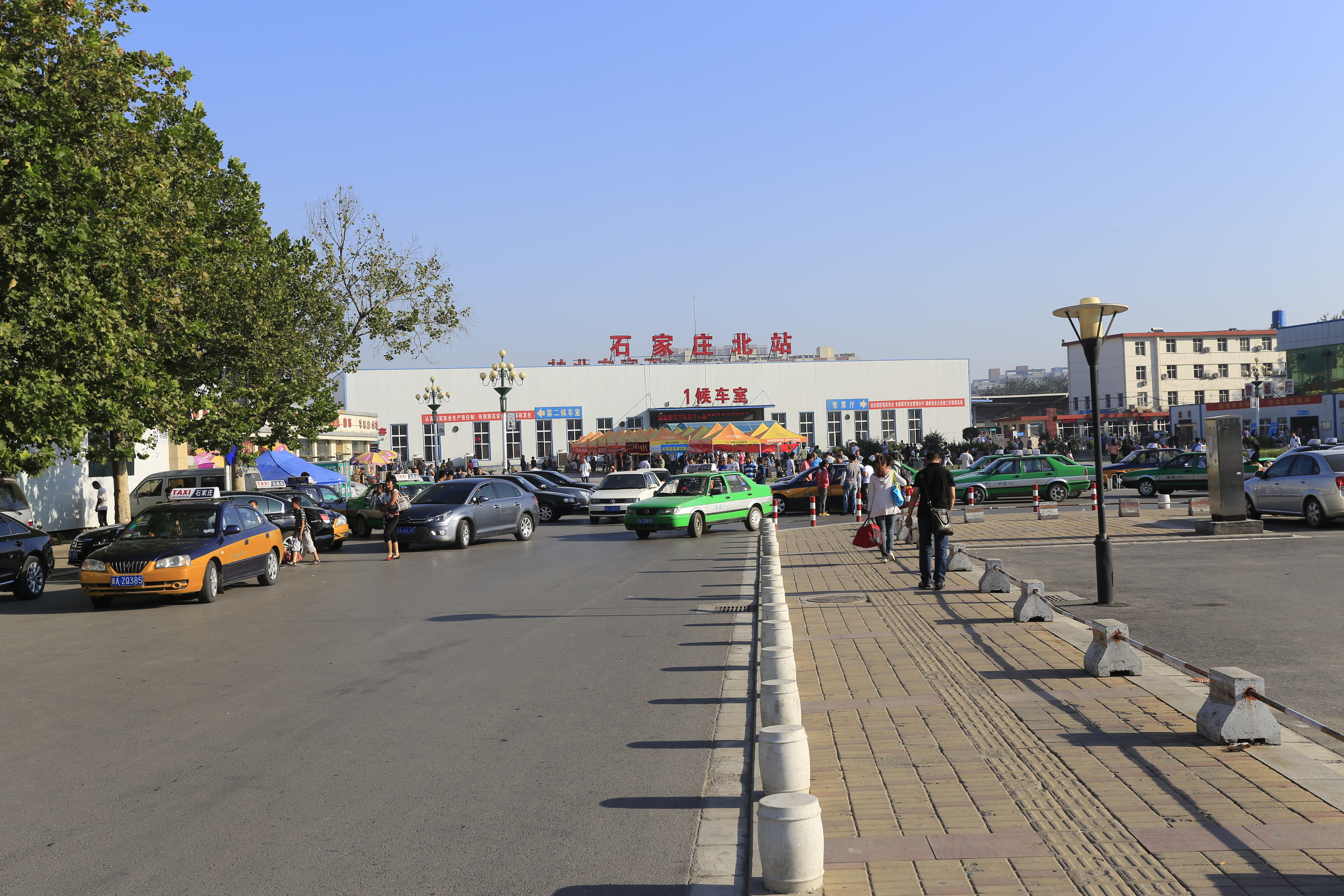

- Location in Hebei
- Coordinates: 38°04′07″N 114°27′11″E
- Country: People's Republic of China
- Province: Hebei
- Prefecture-level city: Shijiazhuang
- District: Xinhua
- Village-level divisions: 6 residential communities
- Elevation: 82 m (269 ft)
- Time zone: UTC+8 (China Standard)
- Postal code: 050081
- Area code: 0311

Hezuo Road Subdistrict (Chinese: 合作路街道; pinyin: Hézuò Lù Jiēdào) is a subdistrict of Xinhua District, in the northwest of Shijiazhuang, Hebei, People's Republic of China. As of 2011, it has 6 residential communities (居委会) under its administration.

== See also ==
- List of township-level divisions of Hebei
