= Tianyuan Subdistrict =

Coordinates: 38°04′43″N 114°27′16″E

Tianyuan Subdistrict 天苑街道
- Subdistrict

Chinese transcription(s)
- Interactive map of Tianyuan Subdistrict
- Country: China
- Province: Hebei
- Prefecture: Shijiazhuang
- District: Xinhua District
- Time zone: UTC+8 (China Standard Time)

Tianyuan Subdistrict (Chinese: 天苑街道) is a township-level division of Xinhua District, Shijiazhuang, Hebei, China.

== See also ==
- List of township-level divisions of Hebei
