= Lianmeng Road Subdistrict =

Lianmeng Road Subdistrict 联盟路街道
- Subdistrict
- Location in Hebei
- Coordinates: 38°04′39″N 114°29′12″E
- Country: People's Republic of China
- Province: Hebei
- Prefecture-level city: Shijiazhuang
- District: Xinhua
- Village-level divisions: 7 residential communities 1 village
- Elevation: 81 m (266 ft)
- Time zone: UTC+8 (China Standard)
- Postal code: 050061
- Area code: 0311

Lianmeng Road Subdistrict (simplified Chinese: 联盟路街道; traditional Chinese: 聯盟路街道; pinyin: Liánméng Lù Jiēdào; lit. 'union road') is a subdistrict of Xinhua District, Shijiazhuang, Hebei, People's Republic of China. As of 2011, it has seven residential communities (居委会) and one village under its administration.

== See also ==
- List of township-level divisions of Hebei
