= Xinhua Road Subdistrict, Shijiazhuang =

Coordinates: 38.04754°N 114.47518°E

Xinhua Road Subdistrict 新华路街道
- Subdistrict

Chinese transcription(s)
- Interactive map of Xinhua Road Subdistrict
- Country: China
- Province: Hebei
- Prefecture: Shijiazhuang
- District: Xinhua District
- Time zone: UTC+8 (China Standard Time)

Fortune House Restaurant, La Maison Française

Xinhua Road Subdistrict (Chinese: 新华路街道) is a township-level division of Xinhua District, Shijiazhuang, Hebei, China.

== See also ==
- List of township-level divisions of Hebei
