= Dubei Township =

Dubei Township 杜北乡
- Township
- Location in Hebei
- Coordinates: 38°07′59″N 114°26′06″E
- Country: People's Republic of China
- Province: Hebei
- Prefecture-level city: Shijiazhuang
- District: Xinhua
- Village-level divisions: 1 residential community 7 villages
- Elevation: 84 m (276 ft)
- Time zone: UTC+8 (China Standard)
- Area code: 0311

Dubei (Chinese: 杜北; pinyin: Dùběi) is a township of Xinhua District, in the northwestern suburbs of Shijiazhuang, Hebei, People's Republic of China, As of 2011, it has one residential community (居委会) seven villages under its administration.

== See also ==
- List of township-level divisions of Hebei
