= Xinhua, Shijiazhuang =

Xinhua 新华区
- District
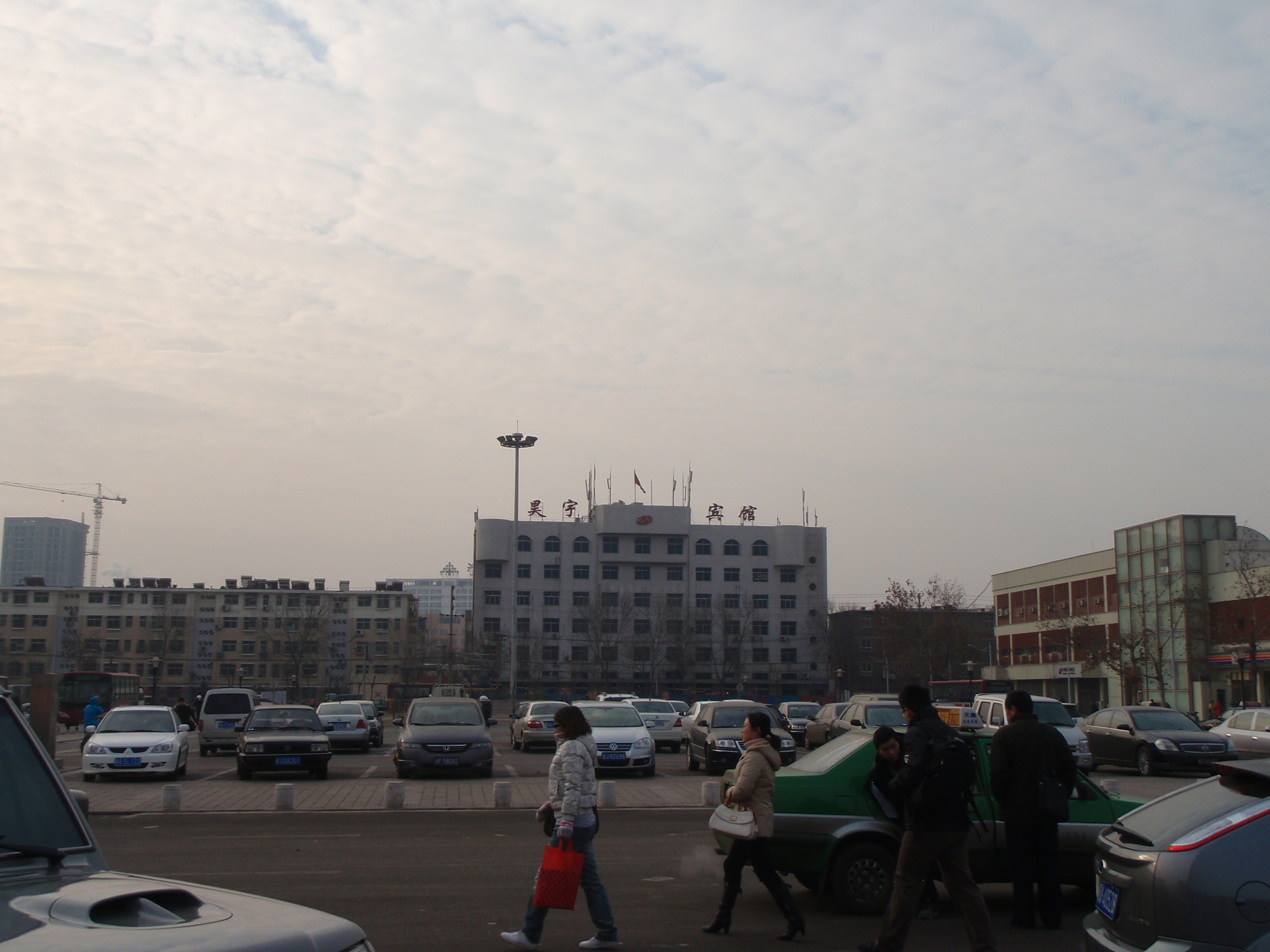
- View near Shijiazhuang North railway station

- Location in Hebei/Shijiazhuang Xinhua (Shijiazhuang)
- Coordinates: 38°03′04″N 114°27′47″E
- Country: People's Republic of China
- Province: Hebei
- Prefecture-level city: Shijiazhuang

Area
  - Total: 90.64 km^{2} (35.00 sq mi)

Population (2020 census)
  - Total: 802,057
  - Density: 8,849/km^{2} (22,920/sq mi)
- Time zone: UTC+8 (China Standard)

Xinhua District (simplified Chinese: 新华区; traditional Chinese: 新華區; pinyin: Xīnhuá Qū; lit. 'New China') is one of eight districts of the prefecture-level city of Shijiazhuang, the capital of Hebei Province, North China, located in the northwest of the urban core of Shijiazhuang.

Sanlu, when it existed, had its headquarters in Xinhua.

== Administrative divisions ==
There are 11 subdistricts, 2 towns, and 2 townships.

Subdistricts:

- Gexin Subdistrict (革新街道)
- Xinhua Road Subdistrict (新华路街道)
- Ning'an Subdistrict (宁安街道)
- Dongjiao Subdistrict (东焦街道)
- Xiyuan Subdistrict (西苑街道)
- Hezuo Road Subdistrict (合作路街道)
- Lianmeng Subdistrict (联盟街道)
- Shigang Subdistrict (石岗街道)
- Wuqi Subdistrict (五七街道)
- Tianyuan Subdistrict (天苑街道)
- Beiyuan Subdistrict (北苑街道)

Towns:

- Daguo (大郭镇)
- Zhaolingpuxi (赵陵铺西镇)

Townships:

- Sanzhuang Township (三庄乡)
- Dubei Township (杜北乡)
