= MNI – Market News =

British financial news organization

- Company type: Privately held company
- Industry: News
- Founded: 1983; 43 years ago
- Headquarters: London, United Kingdom
- Key people: Terry Alexander, CEO
- Services: Online newspaper
- Owner: Tenzing
- Number of employees: 125 (2015)
- Website: www.marketnews.com

MNI – Market News is a financial news organization focused on international capital markets. It is a provider of real-time news and analysis for the global foreign exchange market and fixed income markets. MNI has 12 bureaus across the United States, Asia, and Europe and is headquartered in London. Market News has press credentials recognized by the White House, United States Congress, the Federal Reserve, the Deutsche Bundesbank, the European Central Bank, as well as by the governments and central banks of all Group of Seven nations.

== History ==
MNI was founded in 1983 by economist Robert Jones to advise on any pending actions by the Federal Reserve. MMS was an early innovator in the field of real-time analytics for traders.

In December 2003, it was acquired by Xinhua Finance. In December 2008, Deutsche Börse paid $10 million to buy MNI from Xinhua. On 5 July 2016 Deutsche Börse agreed to sell MNI to Hale Global.

In 2004, MNI came in the spotlight as financial news service provider through its publication of articles on European and global markets incorporating market intelligence from sources of the European Central Bank. After 2007, MNI rose to prominence by way of publishing exclusive headlines and interviews on the Greek government-debt crisis, which were widely report by international news agencies as well as regional and local media outlets around the world.

MNI laid off at least 17 employees shortly after the sale to Hale Global, including long time Federal Reserve reporter Steven Beckner and executive editor Tony Mace. Since then there have been two more rounds of layoffs—one in September 2017, which included Treasury reporter and one-time DC Bureau chief Denny Gulino, and one in January 2018.

In the beginning of 2017, journalist Angelika Papamiltiadou was promoted by Hale Global as the agency's chief European correspondent and Brussels bureau chief, only to be laid off a few months later.

In December 2017, Terry Alexander joined as CEO and Ricard Hall joined as Non-Executive Chairman.

In August 2022 MNI was acquired by Tenzing.
