= Gexin Avenue Subdistrict =

Gexin Avenue Subdistrict 革新街街道
- Subdistrict
- Location in Hebei
- Coordinates: 38°02′56″N 114°27′52″E
- Country: People's Republic of China
- Province: Hebei
- Prefecture-level city: Shijiazhuang
- District: Xinhua
- Village-level divisions: 5 residential communities
- Elevation: 81 m (266 ft)
- Time zone: UTC+8 (China Standard)
- Postal code: 050051
- Area code: 0311

Gexin Avenue Subdistrict (Chinese: 革新街街道; pinyin: Géxīn jiē Jiēdào; lit. 'innovation') is a subdistrict and the seat of Xinhua District, in the heart of Shijiazhuang, Hebei, People's Republic of China. As of 2011, it has 5 residential communities (居委会) under its administration.

== See also ==
- List of township-level divisions of Hebei
