= History of the Kuomintang =

The Kuomintang (KMT) is a Chinese political party that ruled mainland China from 1927 to 1949 prior to its relocation to Taiwan as a result of the Chinese Civil War. The name of the party translates directly as "Chinese National Party" and was historically referred to as the Chinese Nationalists. The party was initially founded on 23 August 1912, by Sun Yat-sen but dissolved in November 1913. It reformed on October 10, 1919, again led by Sun Yat-sen, and became the ruling party in China. After Sun's death, the party was dominated from 1927 to 1975 by Chiang Kai-shek. After the KMT lost the civil war with the Chinese Communist Party in 1949, the party retreated to Taiwan and remains a major political party of the Republic of China based in Taiwan.

Founded in 1912 by Sun Yat-sen, the KMT helped topple the Qing dynasty and promoted modernization along Western lines. The party played a significant part in the first Chinese first National Assembly where it was the majority party. However the KMT failed to achieve complete control. The post of president was given to Yuan Shikai (1859–1916) as reward for his part in the revolution. Yuan Shikai abused his powers, overriding the constitution and creating strong tensions between himself and the other parties. In July 1913, the KMT staged a 'Second Revolution' to depose Yuan. This failed and the following crack down by Yuan led to the dissolution of the KMT and the exile of its leadership, mostly to Japan. Subsequently, Yuan Shikai had himself made Emperor of China.

In exile, Sun Yat-sen and other former KMT members founded several revolutionary parties under various names but with little success. These parties were united by Sun in 1919 under the title "Kuomintang of China". The new party returned to Guangzhou in China in 1920 where it set up a government but failed to achieve control of all of China. After the death of Yuan Shikai in 1916, China fractured into many regions controlled by warlords. To strengthen the party's position, it accepted aid and support from the Soviet Union and its Comintern. The fledgling Chinese Communist Party was encouraged to join the KMT and thus formed the First United Front. The KMT gradually increased its sphere of influence from its Guangzhou base. Sun Yat-sen died in 1925 and Chiang Kai-shek (1887–1975) became the KMT strong man. In 1926 Chiang led a military operation known as the Northern Expedition against the warlords that controlled much of the country. In 1927, Chiang instigated the April 12 Incident in Shanghai in which the Chinese Communist Party and Communist elements of the KMT were purged. The Northern Expedition proved successful and the KMT party came to power throughout China (except Manchuria) in 1927 under the leadership of Chiang. The capital of China was moved to Nanjing in order to be closer to the party's strong base in southern China.

The party was always concerned with strengthening Chinese identity at the same time it was discarding old traditions in the name of modernity. In 1929, the KMT government suppressed the textbook Modern Chinese History, widely used in secondary education. The Nationalists were concerned that, by not admitting the existence of the earliest emperors in ancient Chinese history, the book would weaken the foundation of the state. The case of the Modern Chinese History textbook reflects the symptoms of the period: banning the textbook strengthened the Nationalists' ideological control but also revealed their fear of the New Culture Movement and its more liberal ideological implications. The KMT tried to destroy the Communist party of Mao Zedong, but was unable to stop the invasion by Japan, which controlled most of the coastline and major cities, 1937–1945. Chiang Kai-shek secured massive military and economic aid from the United States, and in 1945 became one of the five permanent members of the UN Security Council, with a veto. The KMT governed most of China until it was defeated in the civil war by the Communists in 1949.

The leadership, the remaining army, and hundreds of thousands of businessmen and other supporters, two million in all, fled to Taiwan. They continued to operate there as the "Republic of China" and dreamed of invading and reconquering what they called "mainland China". The United States, however, set up a naval cordon after 1950 that has since prevented an invasion in either direction. The KMT kept the island under martial law for 38 years under rule by Chiang Kai-shek and his son Chiang Ching-kuo (1910–1988). As the original leadership died off, it made a peaceful transition to democracy, with full election of parliament in the early 1990s and first direct presidential election in 1996. After a defeat by the Democratic Progressive Party in 2000, the KMT returned to power in the elections of 2008 and 2012.

== Early years ==
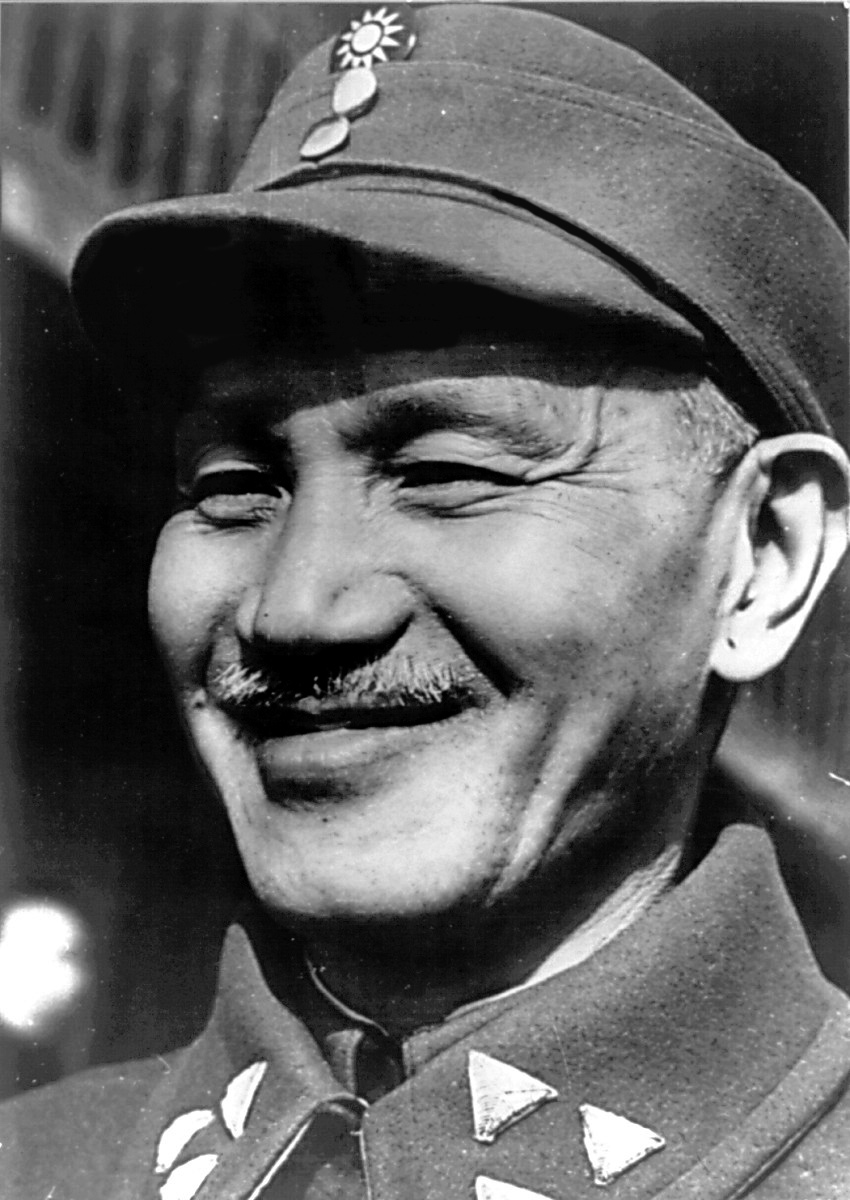
Generalissimo Chiang Kai-shek, who assumed the leadership of the Kuomintang (KMT) after the death of Sun Yat-sen in 1925

The Kuomintang traces its roots to the Revive China Society, which was founded in 1895 and merged with several other anti-monarchist societies as the Revolutionary Alliance in 1905. After the overthrow of the Qing dynasty in the 1911 Xinhai Revolution and the founding of the Republic of China, the Kuomintang was formally established on 25 August 1912 at the Huguang Guild Hall in Beijing where the Revolutionary Alliance and several smaller revolutionary groups joined to contest the first National Assembly elections. Sun Yat-sen, who had just stepped down as provisional president of the Republic of China, was chosen as its overall leader under the title of premier (Chinese: 總理; pinyin: zǒnglǐ), and Huang Xing was chosen as Sun's deputy. However, the most influential member of the party was the third ranking Song Jiaoren, who mobilized mass support from gentry and merchants for the KMT on a platform of promoting constitutional parliamentary democracy. Though the party had an overwhelming majority in the first National Assembly, President Yuan Shikai started ignoring the parliamentary body in making presidential decisions, counter to the Constitution, and assassinated its parliamentary leader Song Jiaoren in Shanghai in 1913. Members of the KMT led by Sun Yat-sen staged the Second Revolution in July 1913, a poorly planned and ill-supported armed rising to overthrow Yuan, and failed.

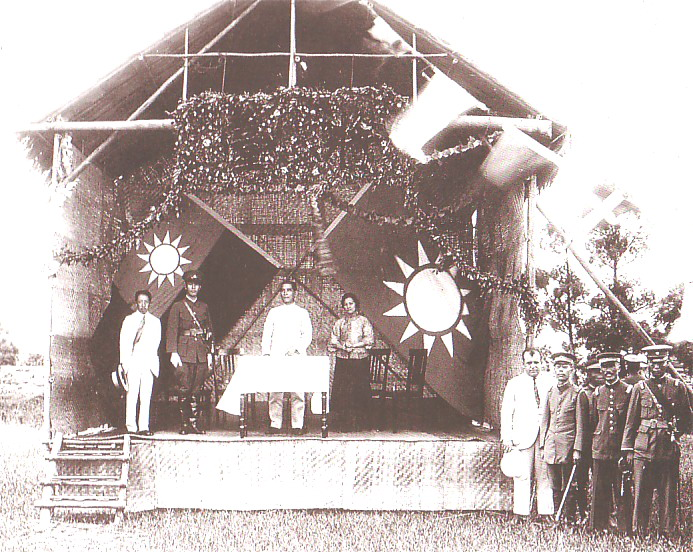
Sun Yat-sen [middle] and Chiang Kai-shek [on stage in uniform] at the founding of the Whampoa Military Academy in 1924

Yuan dissolved the KMT in November (whose members had largely fled into exile in Japan) and dismissed the parliament early in 1914. Yuan Shikai proclaimed himself emperor in December 1915. While exiled in Japan in 1914, Sun established the Chinese Revolutionary Party, but many of his old revolutionary comrades, including Huang Xing, Wang Jingwei, Hu Hanmin and Chen Jiongming, refused to join him or support his efforts in inciting armed uprising against Yuan Shikai. In order to join the Chinese Revolutionary Party, members must take an oath of personal loyalty to Sun, which many old revolutionaries regarded as undemocratic and contrary to the spirit of the revolution. Thus, many old revolutionaries did not join Sun's new organization, and he was largely sidelined within the Republican movement during this period. Sun returned to China in 1917 to establish a rival government in Guangzhou, but was soon forced out of office and exiled to Shanghai. There, with renewed support, he resurrected the KMT on 10 October 1919, but under the name of the Chinese Kuomintang, as the old party had simply been called the Kuomintang. In 1920, Sun and the KMT were restored in Guangdong. In 1923, the KMT and its government accepted aid from the Soviet Union after being denied recognition by the western powers. Soviet advisers – the most prominent of whom was Mikhail Borodin, an agent of the Comintern – began to arrive in China in 1923 to aid in the reorganization and consolidation of the KMT along the lines of the Communist Party of the Soviet Union, establishing a Leninist party structure that lasted into the 1990s. The Chinese Communist Party (CCP) was under Comintern instructions to cooperate with the KMT, and its members were encouraged to join while maintaining their separate party identities, forming the First United Front between the two parties.

Soviet advisers also helped the Nationalists set up a political institute to train propagandists in mass mobilization techniques, and in 1923 Chiang Kai-shek, one of Sun's lieutenants from the Tongmenghui days, was sent to Moscow for several months' military and political study. At the first party congress in 1924, which included non-KMT delegates such as members of the CCP, they adopted Sun's political theory, which included the Three Principles of the People – nationalism, democracy, and people's livelihood.

== War with communists ==
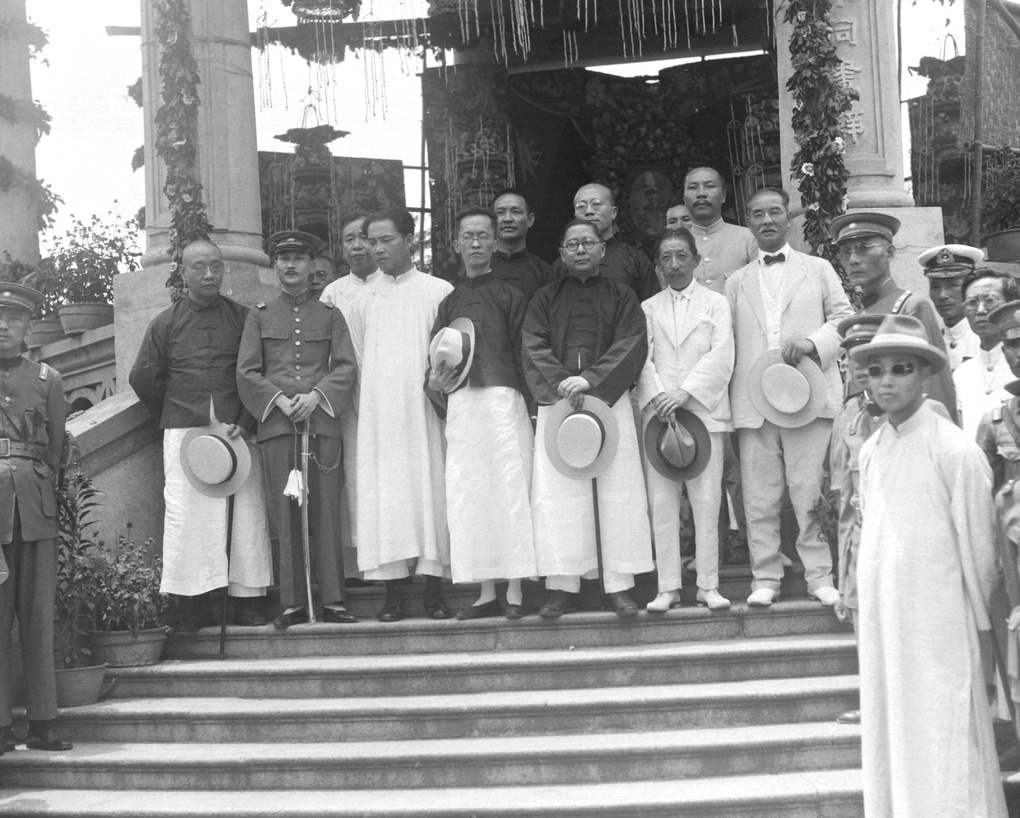
Some members of Nationalist government Standing Committee in 1925

Following the death of Sun Yat-sen, General Chiang Kai-shek emerged as the KMT leader and launched the Northern Expedition in 1926 to defeat the northern warlords and unite China under the party. He halted briefly in Shanghai in 1927 to purge the Communists who had been allied with the KMT, which sparked the Chinese Civil War. When Kuomintang forces took Beijing, as the city was the de jure internationally recognized capital, though previously controlled by the feuding warlords, this event allowed the Kuomintang to receive widespread diplomatic recognition in the same year. The capital was moved from Beijing to Nanjing, the original capital of the Ming dynasty, and thus a symbolic purge of the final Qing elements. This period of KMT rule in China between 1927 and 1937 became known as the Nanjing decade.

In sum, the KMT began as a heterogeneous group advocating American-inspired federalism and provincial independence. However, after its reorganization along Soviet lines, the party aimed to establish a centralized one-party state with one ideology – Three Principles of the People. This was even more evident following Sun's elevation into a cult figure after his death. The control by one single party began the period of "political tutelage", whereby the party was to control the government while instructing the people on how to participate in a democratic system. After several military campaigns and with the help of German military advisors (German planned fifth "extermination campaign"), the Communists were forced to withdraw from their bases in southern and central China into the mountains in a massive military retreat known famously as the Long March, an undertaking which would eventually increase their reputation among the peasants. Out of the 86,000 Communist soldiers that broke out of the pocket, only 20,000 would make the 10,000 km march to Shaanxi province. The Kuomintang continued to attack the Communists. This was in line with Chiang's policy of solving internal conflicts (warlords and communists) before fighting external invasions (Japan). However, Zhang Xueliang, who believed that the Japanese invasion constituted the greater prevailing threat, took Chiang hostage during the Xi'an Incident in 1937 and forced Chiang to agree to an alliance with the Communists in the total war against the Japanese. The Second Sino-Japanese War had officially started, and would last until the Japanese surrender in 1945. However, in many situations the alliance was in name only; after a brief period of cooperation, the armies began to fight the Japanese separately, rather than as coordinated allies. Conflicts between KMT and communists were still common during the war, and documented claims of Communist attacks upon the KMT forces, and vice versa, abound.

In these incidents, the KMT armies typically utilized more traditional tactics while the Communists chose guerilla tactics, leading to KMT claims that the Communists often refused to support the KMT troops this coincided with the invasion of Hunan in 1941 to safeguard the KMT's interests in the region, choosing to withdraw and let the KMT troops take the brunt of Japanese attacks. These same guerilla tactics, honed against the Japanese forces, were used to great success later during open civil war, as well as the Allied forces in the Korean War and the U.S. forces in the Vietnam War.

=== 1945–1949 ===
Full-scale civil war between the Communists and KMT resumed after the defeat of Japan. The Communist armies, previously a minor faction, grew rapidly in influence and power due to several errors on the KMT's part: first, the KMT reduced troop levels precipitously after the Japanese surrender, leaving large numbers of able-bodied, trained fighting men who became unemployed and disgruntled with the KMT as prime recruits for the Communists.

Second, the collapse of the KMT regime can in part be attributed to the government's economic policies, which triggered capital flight among the businessmen who had been the KMT's strongest supporters. The cotton textile industry was the leading sector of Chinese industry, but in 1948, shortages of raw cotton plunged the industry into dire straits. The KMT government responded with an aggressive control policy that directly procured cotton from producers to ensure a sufficient supply and established a price freeze on cotton thread and textiles. This policy failed because of resistance from cotton textile industrialists, who relocated textile facilities and capital to Hong Kong or Taiwan around the end of 1948 and early 1949 when prices soared and inflation spiraled out of control. Their withdrawal of support was a shattering blow to the morale of the KMT.

Among the most despised and ineffective efforts it undertook to contain inflation was the conversion to the gold standard for the national treasury and the Gold Standard Script (Chinese: 金圓券; pinyin: jīn yuán quàn) in August 1948, outlawing private ownership of gold, silver, and foreign exchange, collecting all such precious metals and foreign exchange from the people and issuing the Gold Standard Script in exchange. The new script became worthless in only ten months and greatly reinforced the nationwide perception of KMT as a corrupt or at best inept entity. Third, Chiang Kai-shek ordered his forces to defend the urbanized cities. This decision gave the Communists a chance to move freely through the countryside. At first, the KMT had the edge with the aid of weapons and ammunition from the United States. However, with hyperinflation and other economic ills, widespread corruption, the KMT continued to lose popular support. At the same time, the suspension of American aid and tens of thousands of deserted or decommissioned soldiers being recruited to the Communist cause tipped the balance of power quickly to the Communist side, and the overwhelming popular support for the Communists in most of the country made it all but impossible for the KMT forces to carry out successful assaults against the Communists. By the end of 1949, the Communists controlled almost all of mainland China, as the KMT retreated to Taiwan with a significant amount of China's national treasures and 2 million people, including military forces and refugees. Some party members stayed in the mainland and broke away from the main KMT to found the Revolutionary Committee of the Kuomintang, which still currently exists as one of the eight minor registered parties in the People's Republic of China.

=== After 1949 ===
In the early 1950s, defeated KMT forces entered Burma, retreating into the hills of the Wa region. Communist forces pursued them. With support from the United States, the Nationalist forces reorganized and from 1950 to 1952, launched unsuccessful attacks into Yunnan, China. In 1953, Burma's government raised this violation of its sovereignty by the Chinese Nationalists to the United Nations.

After the KMT guerillas treated into the Kokang region, the Burmese government obtained the assistance of Olive Yang and the Kokang Kakweye to force the guerillas out of Kokang. Yang and the Kokang Kakweye succeeded in 1953, but then collaborated with the Kuomintang in trafficking opium to Thailand throughout the 1950s; the KMT continued to use these opium routes for decades.

== Ideology in mainland China (1920s–1950s) ==
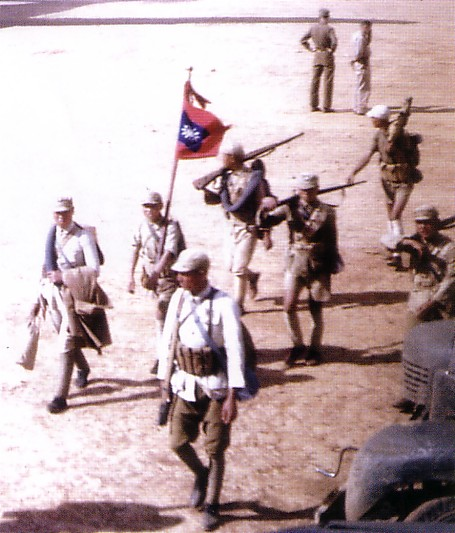
Nationalist soldiers during the Second Sino-Japanese War

=== Chinese nationalism ===
The Kuomintang was a nationalist revolutionary party, which had been supported by the Soviet Union. It was organized on Leninism.

The Kuomintang had several influences left upon its ideology by revolutionary thinking. The Kuomintang and Chiang Kai-shek used the words feudal and counterrevolutionary as synonyms for evil, and backwardness, and proudly proclaimed themselves to be revolutionary. Chiang called the warlords feudalists, and called for feudalism and counterrevolutionaries to be stamped out by the Kuomintang. Chiang showed extreme rage when he was called a warlord, because of its negative, feudal connotations. Ma Bufang was forced to defend himself against the accusations, and stated to the news media that his army was a part of "National army, people's power".

Chiang Kai-shek, the head of the Kuomintang, warned the Soviet Union and other foreign countries about interfering in Chinese affairs. He was personally angry at the way China was treated by foreigners, mainly by the Soviet Union, Britain, and the United States. He and his New Life Movement called for the crushing of Soviet, Western, American and other foreign influences in China. Chen Lifu, a CC Clique member in the KMT, said "Communism originated from Soviet imperialism, which has encroached on our country." It was also noted that "the white bear of the North Pole is known for its viciousness and cruelty".

Kuomintang leaders across China adopted nationalist rhetoric. The Chinese Muslim general Ma Bufang of Qinghai presented himself as a Chinese nationalist to the people of China, fighting against British imperialism, to deflect criticism by opponents that his government was feudal and oppressed minorities like Tibetans and Buddhist Mongols. He used his Chinese nationalist credentials to his advantage to keep himself in power.

=== Fascist influences ===
The Blue Shirts Society, a ultranationalist paramilitary organization within the Kuomintang modeled after Mussolini's blackshirts, was anti-foreign and anticommunist, and stated that its agenda was to expel foreign (Japanese and Western) imperialists from China, crush Communism, and eliminate feudalism. In addition to being anticommunist, some Kuomintang members, like Chiang Kaishek's right-hand man Dai Li were anti-American, and wanted to expel American influence. Close Sino-German ties also promoted cooperation between the Kuomintang and the Nazi Party (NSDAP). The Kuomintang sought to build a one-party ideological state in China, called Dang Guo, to solidify its rule and ideological supremacy.

The New Life Movement was a government-led civic movement in 1930s China initiated by Chiang Kai-shek to promote cultural reform and Neo-Confucian social morality and to ultimately unite China under a centralised ideology following the emergence of ideological challenges to the status quo. The Movement attempted to counter threats of Western and Japanese imperialism through a resurrection of traditional Chinese morality, which it held to be superior to modern Western values. As such the Movement was based upon Confucianism, mixed with Christianity, nationalism and authoritarianism that have some similarities to fascism. It rejected individualism and liberalism, while also opposing socialism and communism. Some historians regard this movement as imitating Nazism and being a neo-nationalistic movement used to elevate Chiang's control of everyday lives. Frederic Wakeman suggested that the New Life Movement was "Confucian fascism".

According to Stanley Payne, Chiang's KMT was "normally classified as a multi-class populist or 'nation-building' party but not a fitting candidate for fascism (except by old-line Communists)." He also stated that, "Lloyd Eastman has called the Blue Shirts, whose members admired European fascism and were influenced by it, a Chinese fascist organization. This is probably an exaggeration. The Blue Shirts certainly exhibited some of the characteristics of fascism, as did many nationalist organizations around the world, but it is not clear that the group possessed the full qualities of an intrinsic fascist movement....The Blue Shirts probably had some affinity with and for fascism, a common feature of nationalisms in crisis during the 1930s, but it is doubtful that they represented any clear-cut Asian variant of fascism." The Sino-German relationship also rapidly deteriorated as Germany failed to pursue a détente between China and Japan, which led to the outbreak of the Second Sino-Japanese War. China later declared war on fascist countries, including Germany, Italy, and Japan, as part of the Declarations of war during World War II and Chiang, the head of the KMT, became the most powerful "anti-fascist" leader in Asia.

=== Ideology of the New Guangxi clique ===
Dr. Sun Yat-sen, the founding father of the Republic of China and of the Kuomintang party praised the Boxers in the Boxer Rebellion for fighting against Western Imperialism. He said the Boxers were courageous and fearless, fighting to the death against the Western armies, Dr. Sun specifically cited the Battle of Yangcun.

During the Northern Expedition, the Kuomintang incited anti-foreign, anti-western sentiment. Portraits of Sun Yatsen replaced the crucifix in several churches, KMT posters proclaimed- "Jesus Christ is dead. Why not worship something alive such as Nationalism?". Foreign missionaries were attacked and anti foreign riots broke out.

The Kuomintang branch in Guangxi province, led by the New Guangxi clique implemented anti-imperialist, anti-religious, and anti-foreign policies.

During the Northern Expedition, in 1926 in Guangxi, Muslim General Bai Chongxi led his troops in destroying Buddhist temples and smashing idols, turning the temples into schools and Kuomintang party headquarters. It was reported that almost all of Buddhist monasteries in Guangxi were destroyed by Bai in this manner. The monks were removed. Bai led an anti-foreign wave in Guangxi, attacking American, European, and other foreigners and missionaries, and generally making the province unsafe for non-natives. Westerners fled from the province, and some Chinese Christians were also attacked as imperialist agents.

The three goals of his movement were anti-foreign, anti-imperialism, and anti-religion. Bai led the anti-religious movement, against superstition. Huang Shaoxiong, also a Kuomintang member of the New Guangxi clique, supported Bai's campaign, and Huang was not a Muslim, the anti religious campaign was agreed upon by all Guangxi Kuomintang members.

As a Kuomintang member, Bai and the other Guangxi clique members allowed the Communists to continue attacking foreigners and smash idols, since they shared the goal of expelling the foreign powers from China, but they stopped Communists from initiating social change.

General Bai also wanted to aggressively expel foreign powers from other areas of China. Bai gave a speech in which he said that the minorities of China were suffering under foreign oppression. He cited specific examples, such as the Tibetans under the British, the Manchus under the Japanese, the Mongols under the Outer Mongolian People's Republic, and the Uyghurs of Xinjiang under the Soviet Union. Bai called upon China to assist them in expelling the foreigners from those lands. He personally wanted to lead an expedition to seize back Xinjiang to bring it under Chinese control, in the style that Zuo Zongtang led during the Dungan revolt.

During the Kuomintang Pacification of Qinghai the Muslim General Ma Bufang destroyed Tibetan Buddhist monasteries with support from the Kuomintang government.

General Ma Bufang, a Sufi, who backed the Yihewani Muslims, and persecuted the Fundamentalist Salafi/Wahhabi Muslim sect. The Yihewani forced the Salafis into hiding. They were not allowed to move or worship openly. The Yihewani had become secular and Chinese nationalist, and they considered the Salafiyya to be "Heterodox" (xie jiao), and people who followed foreigner's teachings (waidao). Only after the Communists took over were the Salafis allowed to come out and worship openly.

=== Socialism and anti-capitalist agitation ===
The Kuomintang had a left wing and a right wing, the left being more radical in its pro Soviet policies, but both wings equally persecuted merchants, accusing them of being counterrevolutionaries and reactionaries. The right wing under Chiang Kaishek prevailed, and continued radical policies against private merchants and industrialists, even as they denounced communism.

One of the Three Principles of the People of the Kuomintang, Mínshēng, was defined as socialism by Dr. Sun Yat-sen. He defined this principle of saying in his last days "it's socialism and it's communism". The concept may be understood as social welfare as well. Sun understood it as an industrial economy and equality of land holdings for the Chinese peasant farmers. Here he was influenced by the American thinker Henry George (see Georgism) and German thinker Karl Marx; the land value tax in Taiwan is a legacy thereof. He divided livelihood into four areas: food, clothing, housing, and transportation; and planned out how an ideal (Chinese) government can take care of these for its people.

The Kuomintang was referred to having a socialist ideology. "Equalization of land rights" was a clause included by Dr. Sun in the original Tongmenghui. The Kuomintang's revolutionary ideology in the 1920s incorporated unique Chinese Socialism as part of its ideology.

The Soviet Union trained Kuomintang revolutionaries in the Moscow Sun Yat-sen University. In the West and in the Soviet Union, Chiang was known as the "Red General". Movie theaters in the Soviet Union showed newsreels and clips of Chiang, at Moscow Sun Yat-sen University Portraits of Chiang were hung on the walls, and in the Soviet May Day Parades that year, Chiang's portrait was to be carried along with the portraits of Karl Marx, Lenin, Stalin, and other socialist leaders.

The Kuomintang attempted to levy taxes upon merchants in Canton, and the merchants resisted by raising an army, the Merchant's volunteer corps. Dr. Sun initiated this anti merchant policy, and Chiang Kai-shek enforced it, Chiang led his army of Whampoa Military Academy graduates to defeat the merchant's army. Chiang was assisted by Soviet advisors, who supplied him with weapons, while the merchants were supplied with weapons from the Western countries.

The Kuomintang were accused of leading a "Red Revolution" in Canton. The merchants were conservative and reactionary, and their Volunteer Corp leader Chen Lianbao was a prominent comprador trader.

The merchants were supported by the foreign, western Imperialists such as the British, who led an international flotilla to support them against Dr. Sun. Chiang seized the western supplied weapons from the merchants, and battled against them. A Kuomintang General executed several merchants, and the Kuomintang formed a Soviet inspired Revolutionary Committee. The British Communist party congratulated Dr. Sun for his war against foreign imperialists and capitalists.

In 1948, the Kuomintang again attacked the merchants of Shanghai, Chiang Kaishek sent his son Chiang Ching-kuo to restore economic order. Ching-kuo copied Soviet methods, which he learned during his stay there, to start a social revolution by attacking middle class merchants. He also enforced low prices on all goods to raise support from the Proletariat.

As riots broke out and savings were ruined, bankrupting shopowners, Ching-kuo began to attack the wealthy, seizing assets and placing them under arrest. The son of the gangster Du Yuesheng was arrested by him. Ching-kuo ordered Kuomintang agents to raid the Yangtze Development Corporation's warehouses, which was privately owned by H.H. Kung and his family. H.H. Kung's wife was Soong Ai-ling, the sister of Soong Mei-ling who was Ching-kuo's stepmother. H.H. Kung's son David was arrested, the Kung's responded by blackmailing the Chiang's, threatening to release information about them, eventually he was freed after negotiations, and Ching-kuo resigned, ending the terror on the Shanghainese merchants.

The Kuomintang also promotes government-owned corporations. The Kuomintang founder Sun Yat-sen, was heavily influenced by the economic ideas of Henry George, who believed that the rents extracted from natural monopolies or the usage of land belonged to the public. Dr. Sun argued for Georgism and emphasized the importance of a mixed economy, which he termed "The Principle of Minsheng" in his Three Principles of the People.

"The railroads, public utilities, canals, and forests should be nationalized, and all income from the land and mines should be in the hands of the State. With this money in hand, the State can therefore finance the social welfare programs."

The Kuomintang Muslim Governor of Ningxia, Ma Hongkui promoted state owned monopoly companies. His government had a company, Fu Ning Company, which had a monopoly over commercial and industry in Ningxia.

The Kuomintang Muslim Governor of Qinghai, General Ma Bufang was described as a socialist. An American scholar and government advisor, A. Doak Barnett, praised Ma Bufang's government as "one of the most efficient in China, and one of the most energetic. While most of China is bogged down, almost inevitably, by Civil War, Chinghai is attempting to carry our small-scale, but nevertheless ambitious, development and reconstruction schemes on its own initiative"

General Ma started a state run and controlled industrialization project, directly creating educational, medical, agricultural, and sanitation projects, run or assisted by the state. The state provided money for food and uniforms in all schools, state run or private. Roads and a theater were constructed. The state controlled all the press, no freedom was allowed for independent journalists. His regime was dictatorial in its political system. Barnett admitted that the regime had "stern authoritarianism" and "little room for personal freedom".

Corporations such as CSBC Corporation, Taiwan, CPC Corporation, Taiwan and Aerospace Industrial Development Corporation are owned by the state in the Republic of China.

Marxists also existed in the Kuomintang party. They viewed revolution in different terms than the CCP, claiming that China already went past its feudal stage and in a stagnation period rather than in another mode of production. These Marxists in the Kuomintang opposed the Chinese communist party ideology.

=== Confucianism and religion in ideology ===
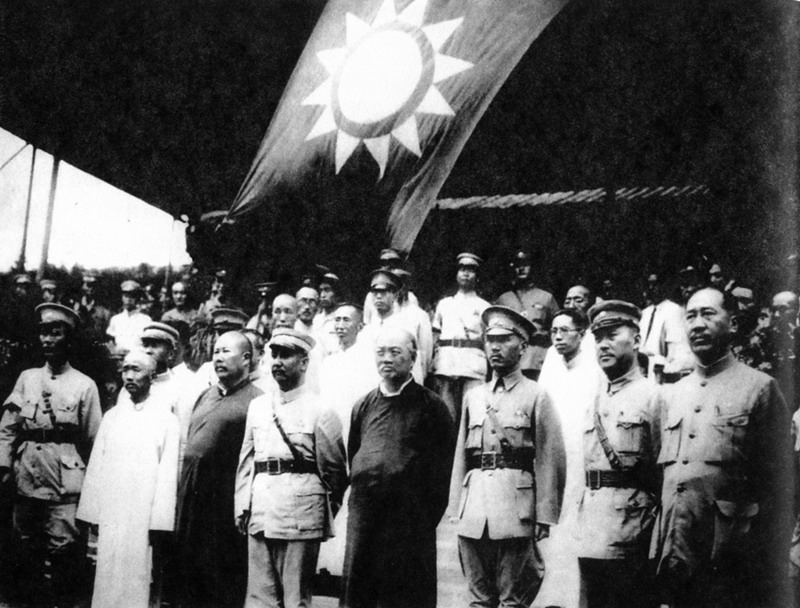
Kuomintang Members pay tribute to the Sun Yat-sen Mausoleum in Beijing in 1928 after the success of the Northern Expedition. From right to left, are Generals Cheng Jin, Zhang Zuobao, Chen Diaoyuan, Chiang Kai-shek, Woo Tsin-hang, Wen Xishan, General Ma Fuxiang, Ma Sida, and General Bai Chongxi.

The Kuomintang used traditional Chinese religious ceremonies. The souls of Party martyrs who died fighting for the Kuomintang and the revolution, and the party founder Dr. Sun Yat-sen, were sent to heaven, according to the Kuomintang party. Chiang Kai-shek believed that these martyrs witnessed events on earth from heaven.

When the Northern Expedition was complete, Kuomintang Generals led by Chiang Kai-shek paid tribute to Dr. Sun's soul in heaven with a sacrificial ceremony at the Xiangshan Temple in Beijing in July 1928, among the Kuomintang Generals present were the Muslim Generals Bai Chongxi and Ma Fuxiang.

The Kuomintang backed the New Life Movement, which promoted Confucianism, and it was also against westernization.

The Kuomintang leaders also opposed the May Fourth Movement. Chiang Kai-shek, as a nationalist, and Confucianist, was against the iconoclasm of the May Fourth Movement. He viewed some western ideas as foreign, as a Chinese nationalist, and that the introduction of western ideas and literature that the May Fourth Movement wanted was not welcome. He and Dr. Sun Yat-sen criticized these May Fourth intellectuals for corrupting morals of youth.

Imams sponsored by the Kuomintang called for Muslims to go on Jihad to become shaheed (Muslim term for martyr) in battle, where Muslims believed they would go automatically to heaven. Becoming a shaheed in the Jihad for the country was encouraged by the Kuomintang, which was called "glorious death for the state" and a hadith promoting nationalism was spread. A song written by Xue Wenbo at the Muslim Chengda school, which was controlled by the Kuomintang, called for martyrdom in battle for China against Japan.

The Kuomintang also incorporated Confucianism in its jurisprudence. It pardoned Shi Jianqiao for murdering Sun Chuanfang, because she did it in revenge since Sun executed her father Shi Congbin, which was an example of Filial piety to one's parents in Confucianism. The Kuomintang encouraged filial revenge killings and extended pardons to those who performed them.

In response to the Cultural Revolution, Chiang Kai-shek promoted a Chinese Cultural Renaissance movement which followed in the steps of the New Life Movement, promoting Confucian values.

==== Stances on women's issues ====
During the White Terror on the mainland that began with the 1927 Shanghai Massacre by the KMT against the Communists, the KMT specifically targeted women perceived as non-traditional. Kuomintang forces presumed that women who had short hair and whom had not been subjected to the practice of foot binding were radicals. Kuomintang forces cut their breasts off, shaved their heads, and displayed their mutilated corpses to intimidate the populace.

The New Life Movement opposed the liberalising stance on women's issues of the earlier May Fourth Movement. The Movement contended that to be virtuous, women should return to the home. Soong Mei-ling was among those who urged women to reform the family and to serve the broader needs of society in China. The movement's women's journal, Women's New Life Movement Monthly, ran from November 1936 to June 1937. It sought to tie the ideas of motherhood, particularly the image of a "super wise wife and good mother" to nationalism.

A group of women within the KMT advocated for women's liberation. This group published the journal Women's Resonance which took a feminist stance. It responded to the New Life Movement's ideal of "super wise wife and good mother" with the idea of "new-wise-wife-good motherism," contending that Confucianism required both women and men to develop the ethics necessary for successful families and a healthy society and that national salvation required women's emancipation. Notable women in the KMT's left wing during this period included Song Qingling and He Xiangning.

During the Second Sino-Japanese War, the KMT government promoted the idea that the role of women as "wise wives and good mothers" was an important contribution to the idea of "Resistance above all". In this view, men should fight on the front lines and women should devote themselves to the home front through participating in child care, production, propaganda, rescue work, and providing battlefield services. Critics of the KMT war-time policies on women contended that they reinforced traditional gender roles left out peasants and working women. In their view, the government encouraged women's participation in the war effort but feared the political influence of women increasing.

==== Modernization ====
Historians until the 1990s often portrayed the KMT simply as a band of corrupt leaders who colluded with rich financiers and industrialists and cared little for China's workers and peasants, contrasting it with the supposed broad base of popular support for the communists. However, as Bodenhorn (2002) shows, scholars are coming to an appreciation of its efforts to build a vibrant and dynamic state, before it lost on the battlefield to the Communists, but then had a second chance on Taiwan where they did succeed.

The KMT promoted science and industry, and tried to eradicate such traditional practices as footbinding, and extravagant marriage and funerary customs. The KMT had a complicated relationship to Christian missionary activity. Many high officials (including Chiang) were Christians and American public opinion that favored China was based on the missionaries. At the same time in the villages the KMT criticized missionary activity as an egregious example of imperialism. No significant action against the churches was taken but criticizing them was a much safer way to spread the anti-imperialist message of the KMT than taking on foreign firms or the U.S. The anti-Christian movements were important tactically for gaining the support of students and others in society who were angry at the influence of outsiders in China.

The Kuomintang purged China's education system of western ideas, introducing Confucianism into the curriculum. Education came under the total control of state, which meant, in effect, the Kuomintang party apparatus, via the Ministry of Education. Military and political classes on the Kuomintang's Three Principles of the People were added. Textbooks, exams, degrees and educational instructors were all controlled by the state, as were all universities.

=== Soviet style military ===
Chiang Ching-kuo, appointed as Kuomintang director of Secret Police in 1950, was educated in the Soviet Union, and initiated Soviet style military organization in the Republic of China Military, reorganizing and Sovietizing the political officer corps, surveillance, and Kuomintang party activities were propagated throughout the military. Opposed to this was Sun Li-jen, who was educated at the American Virginia Military Institute. Chiang Ching-kuo then arrested Sun Li-jen, charging him of conspiring with the American CIA of plotting to overthrow Chiang Kai-shek and the Kuomintang, Sun was placed under house arrest in 1955.

=== Policy on ethnic minorities ===
Former KMT leader Chiang Kai-shek considered all the minority peoples of China as descendants of the Yellow Emperor, the semi-mythical initiator of the Chinese civilization. Chiang considered all ethnic minorities in China to belong to the Zhonghua minzu (Chinese nation) and he introduced this into KMT ideology, which was propagated into the educational system of the Republic of China, and the Constitution of the ROC considered Chiang's ideology to be true. In Taiwan, the president performs a ritual honoring the Yellow Emperor, while facing west, in the direction of mainland China.

The KMT retained the Mongolian and Tibetan Affairs Commission for dealing with Mongolian and Tibetan affairs. A Muslim, Ma Fuxiang, was appointed as its chairman.

The KMT was known for sponsoring Muslim students to study abroad at Muslim universities like Al-Azhar University and it established schools especially for Muslims, Muslim KMT warlords like Ma Fuxiang promoted education for Muslims. KMT Muslim Warlord Ma Bufang built a girls' school for Muslim girls in Linxia City which taught modern secular education.

Tibetans and Mongols refused to allow other ethnic groups like Kazakhs to participate in the Kokonur ceremony in Qinghai, but KMT Muslim General Ma Bufang allowed them to participate.

Chinese Muslims were among the most hardline KMT members. Ma Chengxiang was a Muslim KMT member, and he refused to surrender to the Communists.

The KMT incited anti-Yan Xishan and Feng Yuxiang sentiments among Chinese Muslims and Mongols, encouraging for them to topple their rule during the Central Plains War.

Masud Sabri, a Uyghur was appointed as Governor of Xinjiang by the KMT, as was the Tatar Burhan Shahidi and the Uyghur Yulbars Khan.

The Muslim General Ma Bufang also put KMT symbols on his mansion, the Ma Bufang Mansion along with a portrait of party founder Dr. Sun Yatsen arranged with the KMT flag and the Republic of China flag.

General Ma Bufang and other high ranking Muslim Generals attended the Kokonuur Lake Ceremony where the God of the Lake was worshipped, and during the ritual, the Chinese national anthem was sung, all participants bowed to a Portrait of KMT founder Dr. Sun Yat-sen, and the God of the Lake was also bowed to, and offerings were given to him by the participants, which included the Muslims. This cult of personality around the KMT leader and the KMT was standard in all meetings. Sun Yat-sen's portrait was bowed to three times by KMT party members. Dr. Sun's portrait was arranged with two flags crossed under, the KMT flag and the flag of the Republic of China.

The KMT also hosted conferences of important Muslims like Bai Chongxi, Ma Fuxiang, and Ma Liang. Ma Bufang stressed "racial harmony" as a goal when he was Governor of Qinghai.

In 1939, Isa Yusuf Alptekin and Ma Fuliang were sent on a mission by the KMT to the Middle Eastern countries such as Egypt, Turkey and Syria to gain support for the Chinese War against Japan, they also visited Afghanistan in 1940 and contacted Muhammad Amin Bughra, they asked him to come to Chongqing, the capital of the Nationalist Government. Bughra was arrested by the British government in 1942 for spying, and the KMT arranged for Bughra's release. He and Isa Yusuf worked as editors of KMT Muslim publications. Ma Tianying (馬天英) (1900–1982) led the 1939 mission which had 5 other people including Isa and Fuliang.

=== Anti-separatism ===
The KMT is anti-separatist. During its rule on mainland China, it crushed Uyghur and Tibetan separatist uprisings. The KMT claims sovereignty over Outer Mongolia and Tuva as well as the territories of the modern People's Republic and Republic of China.

KMT Muslim General Ma Bufang waged war on the invading Tibetans during the Sino-Tibetan War with his Muslim army, and he repeatedly crushed Tibetan revolts during bloody battles in Qinghai provinces. Ma Bufang was fully supported by President Chiang Kai-shek, who ordered him to prepare his Muslim army to invade Tibet several times and threatened aerial bombardment on the Tibetans. With support from the KMT, Ma Bufang repeatedly attacked the Tibetan area of Golog seven times during the KMT Pacification of Qinghai, eliminating thousands of Tibetans.

General Ma Fuxiang, the chairman of the Mongolian and Tibetan Affairs Commission stated that Mongolia and Tibet were an integral part of the Republic of China, arguing:

Our Party [the Guomindang] takes the development of the weak and small and resistance to the strong and violent as our sole and most urgent task. This is even more true for those groups which are not of our kind [Ch. fei wo zulei zhe]. Now the people of Mongolia and Tibet are closely related to us, and we have great affection for one another: our common existence and common honor already have a history of over a thousand years. ... Mongolia and Tibet's life and death are China's life and death. China absolutely cannot cause Mongolia and Tibet to break away from China's territory, and Mongolia and Tibet cannot reject China to become independent. At this time, there is not a single nation on earth except China that will sincerely develop Mongolia and Tibet.

Under orders from Nationalist Government of Chiang Kai-shek, the Hui General Ma Bufang, Governor of Qinghai (1937–1949), repaired Yushu airport to prevent Tibetan separatists from seeking independence. Ma Bufang also crushed Mongol separatist movements, abducting the Genghis Khan Shrine and attacking Tibetan Buddhist Temples like Labrang, and keeping a tight control over them through the Kokonur God ceremony.

During the Kumul Rebellion, the KMT 36th Division (National Revolutionary Army) crushed a separatist Uyghur First East Turkestan Republic, delivering it a fatal blow at the Battle of Kashgar (1934). The Muslim General Ma Hushan pledged allegiance to the KMT and crushed another Uyghur revolt at Charkhlik Revolt.

During the Ili Rebellion, the KMT fought against Uyghur separatists and the Soviet Union, and against Mongolia.

== KMT in Taiwan ==
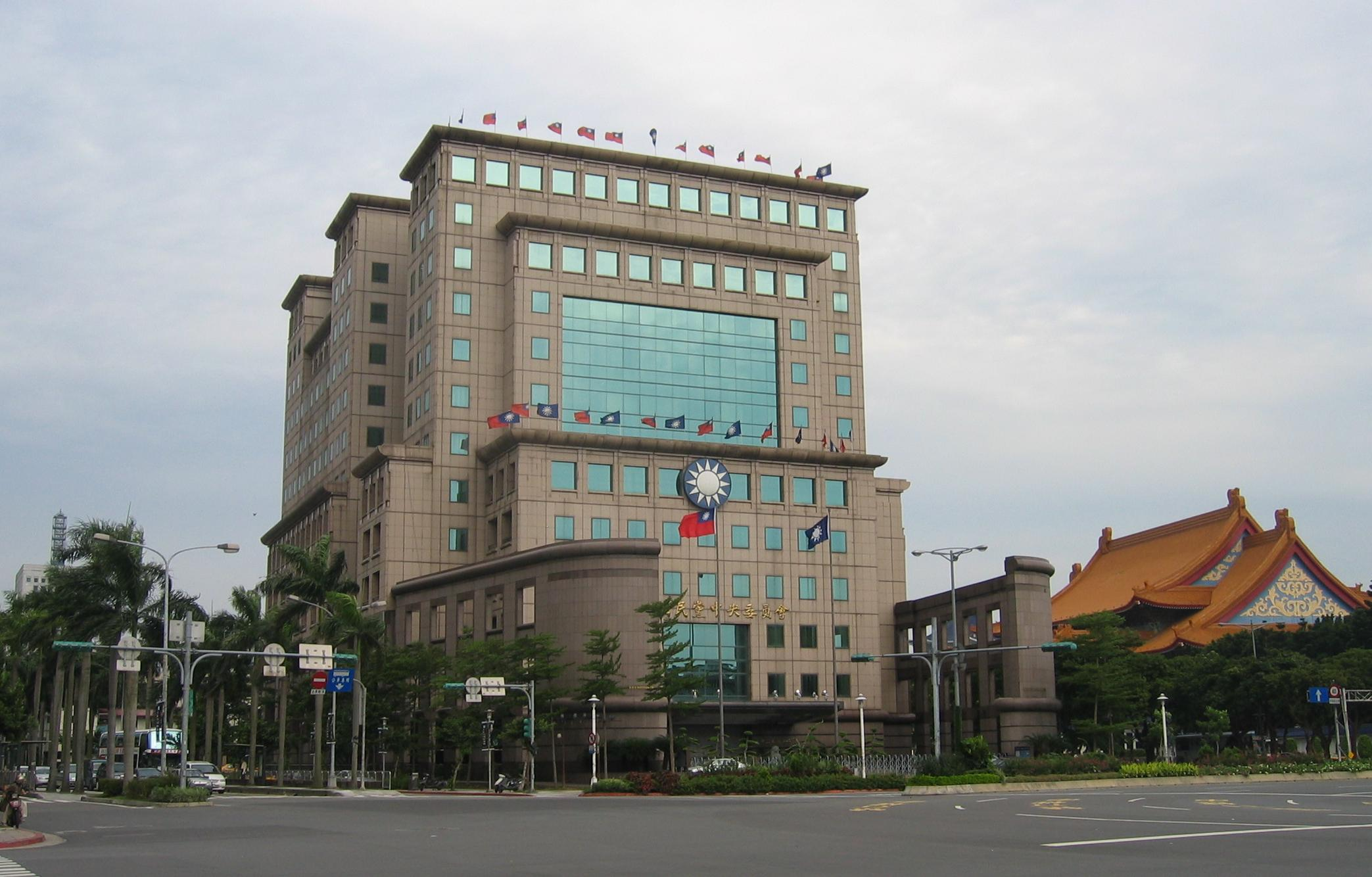
The former KMT headquarters in Taipei City; the imposing structure directly faced the Presidential Building, was seen as a symbol of the party's wealth and dominance.

In 1895, Taiwan, including the Pescadores, became a Japanese colony, a concession by the Qing Empire after it lost the First Sino-Japanese War. After Japan's defeat at the end of World War II in 1945, General Order No. 1 instructed Japan, who surrendered to the US, to surrender its troops in Taiwan to the forces of the Republic of China Kuomintang.

Taiwan was placed under the administrative control of the Republic of China by the United Nations Relief and Rehabilitation Administration (UNRRA), and the ROC put Taiwan under military occupation. Tensions between the local Taiwanese and mainlanders from mainland China increased in the intervening years culminating in a flashpoint on 27 February 1947 in Taipei when a dispute between a female cigarette vendor and an anti-smuggling officer triggered civil disorder and protests that would last for days. The uprising turned bloody and was shortly put down by the ROC Army in the February 28 Incident.

Following the establishment of the People's Republic of China (PRC) on 1 October 1949, the commanders of the PRC People's Liberation Army believed that Kinmen and Matsu had to be taken before a final assault on Taiwan. KMT fought the Battle of Kuningtou and stopped the invasion. In 1950 Chiang took office in Taipei under the Temporary Provisions Effective During the Period of Communist Rebellion. The provision declared martial law in Taiwan and halted some democratic processes, including presidential and parliamentary elections, until the mainland could be recovered from the Communists. KMT estimated it would take 3 years to defeat the Communists. The slogan was "prepare in the first year, start fighting in the second, and conquer in the third year". However, various factors, including international pressure, are believed to have prevented the KMT from militarily engaging the Communists full-scale. A cold war with a couple of minor military conflicts was resulted in the early years. The various government bodies previously in Nanjing were re-established in Taipei as the KMT-controlled government actively claimed sovereignty over all China. The Republic of China in Taiwan retained China's seat in the United Nations until 1971.

Until the 1970s, the KMT successfully pushed ahead with land reforms, developed the economy, implemented a democratic system in a lower level of the government, improved cross-Taiwan Strait relations, and created the Taiwan economic miracle. However KMT controlled the government under a one-party authoritarian state until reforms in the late 1970s through the 1990s. As a result of the February 28 Incident in 1947, Taiwanese people had to endure what is called the "White Terror", a KMT-led political repression. The ROC in Taiwan was once referred to synonymously with the KMT and known simply as "Nationalist China" after its ruling party. In the 1970s, the KMT began to allow for "supplemental elections" in Taiwan to fill the seats of the aging representatives in parliament. Although opposition parties were not permitted, Tangwai (or, "outside the party") representatives were tolerated. In the 1980s, the KMT focused on transforming the government from a one-party system to a multi-party democracy one and embracing "Taiwanizing". With the founding of the Democratic Progressive Party (DPP) in 1986, the KMT started competing against the DPP in parliamentary elections. In 1991, martial law ceased when President Lee Teng-Hui terminated the Temporary Provisions Effective During the Period of Communist Rebellion. All parties started to be allowed to compete at all levels of elections, including the presidential election. Lee Teng-hui, the ROC's first democratically elected president and the leader of the KMT during the 1990s, announced his advocacy of "special state-to-state relations" with the PRC. The PRC associated it with Taiwan independence.

The KMT faced a split in 1994 that led to the formation of the Chinese New Party, alleged to be a result of Lee's "corruptive ruling style". The New Party has, since the purging of Lee, largely reintegrated into KMT. A much more serious split in the party occurred as a result of the 2000 presidential election. Upset at the choice of Lien Chan as the party's presidential nominee, former party Secretary-General James Soong launched an independent bid, which resulted in the expulsion of Soong and his supporters and the formation of the People's First Party (PFP). The KMT candidate placed third behind Soong in the elections. After the election, Lee's strong relationship with the opponent became apparent. In order to prevent defections to the PFP, Lien moved the party away from Lee's pro-independence policies and became more favorable toward Chinese unification. This shift led to Lee's expulsion from the party and the formation of the Taiwan Solidarity Union.

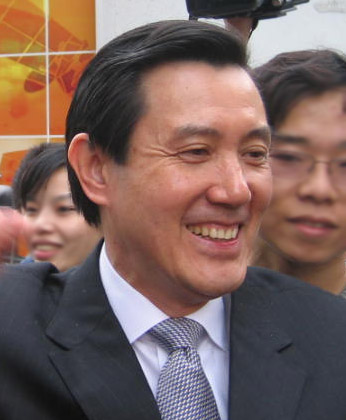
Ma Ying-jeou, the former ROC President and was the former chairman of the Kuomintang from 2005 to 2007

The pan-Blue coalition visited the mainland in 2005. As the ruling party on Taiwan, the KMT amassed a vast business empire of banks, investment companies, petrochemical firms, and television and radio stations, thought to have made it the world's richest political party, with assets once estimated to be around US$2–10 billion. Although this war chest appeared to help the KMT until the mid-1990s, it later led to accusations of corruption (see Black gold (politics)). After 2000, the KMT's financial holdings appeared to be more of a liability than a benefit, and the KMT started to divest its assets. However, the transactions were not disclosed and the whereabouts of the money earned from selling assets (if it has gone anywhere) is unknown. There were accusations in the 2004 presidential election that the KMT retained assets that were illegally acquired. Currently, there is a law proposed by the DPP in the Legislative Yuan to recover illegally acquired party assets and return them to the government; however, since the pan-Blue alliance, the KMT and its smaller partner PFP, control the legislature, it is very unlikely to be passed. The KMT also acknowledged that part of its assets were acquired through extra-legal means and thus promised to "retro-endow" them to the government. However, the quantity of the assets which should be classified as illegal are still under heated debate; DPP, in its capacity as ruling party from 2000 to 2008, claimed that there is much more that the KMT has yet to acknowledge. Also, the KMT actively sold assets under its title in order to quench its recent financial difficulties, which the DPP argues is illegal. Former KMT Chairman Ma Ying-Jeou's position is that the KMT will sell some of its properties at below market rates rather than return them to the government and that the details of these transactions will not be publicly disclosed.

In December 2003, then-KMT chairman (present chairman emeritus) and presidential candidate Lien Chan initiated what appeared to some to be a major shift in the party's position on the linked questions of Chinese unification and Taiwan independence. Speaking to foreign journalists, Lien said that while the KMT was opposed to "immediate independence", it did not wish to be classed as "pro-reunificationist" either.

At the same time, Wang Jin-pyng, speaker of the Legislative Yuan and the pan-Blue Coalition's campaign manager in the 2004 presidential election, said that the party no longer opposed Taiwan's "eventual independence". This statement was later clarified as meaning that the KMT opposes any immediate decision on unification and independence and would like to have this issue resolved by future generations. The KMT's position on the cross-strait relationship was redefined as hoping to remain in the current neither-independent-nor-united situation.

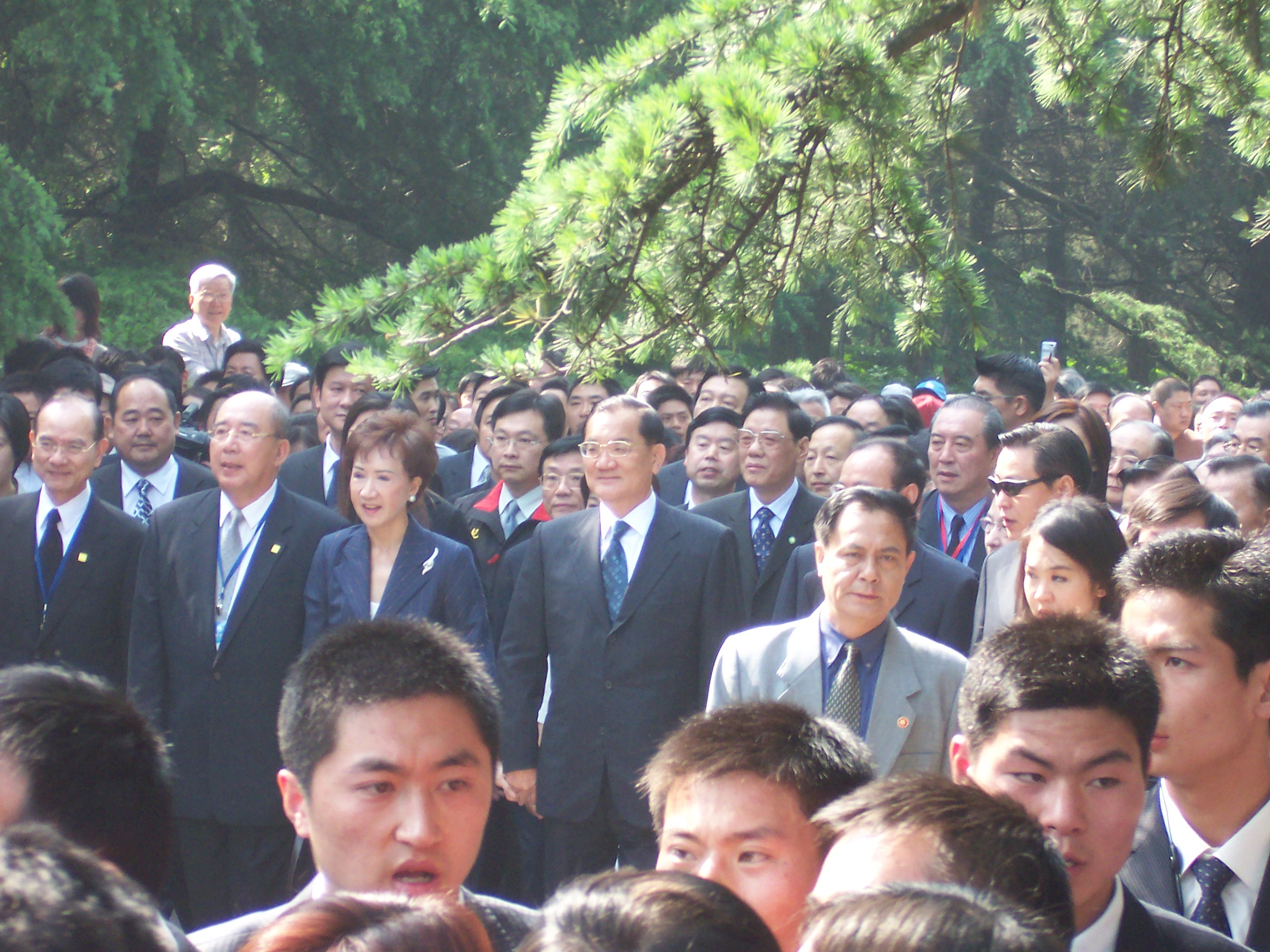
Lien Chan [middle] and Wu Po-hsiung [second left] and the Kuomintang touring the Sun Yat-sen Mausoleum in Nanjing, the People's Republic of China

In 2005, then-party chairman Lien Chan announced that he was to leave his office. The two leading contenders for the position include Ma Ying-jeou and Wang Jin-pyng. On 5 April 2005, Taipei Mayor Ma Ying-jeou said he wished to lead the opposition Kuomintang with Wang Jin-pyng. On 16 July 2005, Ma was elected as KMT chairman in the first contested leadership in Kuomintang's 93-year history. Some 54 percent of the party's 1.04 million members cast their ballots. Ma Ying-jeou garnered 72.4 percent of vote share, or 375,056 votes, against Wang Jin-pyng's 27.6 percent, or 143,268 votes. After failing to convince Wang to stay on as a vice chairman, Ma named holdovers Wu Po-hsiung (吳伯雄), Chiang Pin-kung (江丙坤), and Lin Cheng-chi (林澄枝), as well as long-time party administrator and strategist John Kuan (關中), as vice-chairmen; all appointments were approved by a hand count of party delegates.

There has been a recent warming of relations between the pan-blue coalition and the PRC, with prominent members of both the KMT and PFP in active discussions with officials on the mainland. In February 2004, it appeared that KMT had opened a campaign office for the Lien-Soong ticket in Shanghai targeting Taiwanese businessmen. However, after an adverse reaction in Taiwan, the KMT quickly declared that the office was opened without official knowledge or authorization. In addition, the PRC issued a statement forbidding open campaigning in the mainland and formally stated that it had no preference as to which candidate won and cared only about the positions of the winning candidate.

On 28 March 2005, thirty members of the Kuomintang (KMT), led by KMT vice chairman Chiang Pin-kung, arrived in mainland China. This marked the first official visit by the KMT to the mainland since it was defeated by communist forces in 1949 (although KMT members including Chiang had made individual visits in the past). The delegates began their itinerary by paying homage to the revolutionary martyrs of the Tenth Uprising at Huanghuagang. They subsequently flew to the former ROC capital of Nanjing to commemorate Sun Yat-sen. During the trip KMT signed a 10-points agreement with the CPC. The opponents regarded this visit as the prelude of the third KMT-CPC cooperation. Weeks afterwards, in May, Chairman Lien Chan visited the mainland and met with Hu Jintao. No agreements were signed because Chen Shui-bian's government threatened to prosecute the KMT delegation for treason and violation of R.O.C. laws prohibiting citizens from collaborating with Communists.

On 13 February 2007, Ma was indicted by the Taiwan High Prosecutors Office on charges of allegedly embezzling approximately NT$11 million (US$339,000), regarding the issue of "special expenses" while he was mayor of Taipei. Shortly after the indictment, he submitted his resignation as chairman of the Kuomintang at the same press conference at which he formally announced his candidacy for president. Ma argued that it was customary for officials to use the special expense fund for personal expenses undertaken in the course of their official duties. In December 2007, Ma was acquitted of all charges and immediately filed suit against the prosecutors who are also appealing the acquittal.

In 2020 the 48 year old Johnny Chiang was elected chair of the Kuomintang. He replaced Wu Den-yih who resigned due to the party's defeat in the January elections. Chiang faced challenges both with managing the KMT's history and from a variety of structural problems within the party. In September 2021, Kuomintang elected veteran politician Eric Chu as its new leader to replace Johnny Chiang.

== Chronology of Kuomintang governments ==
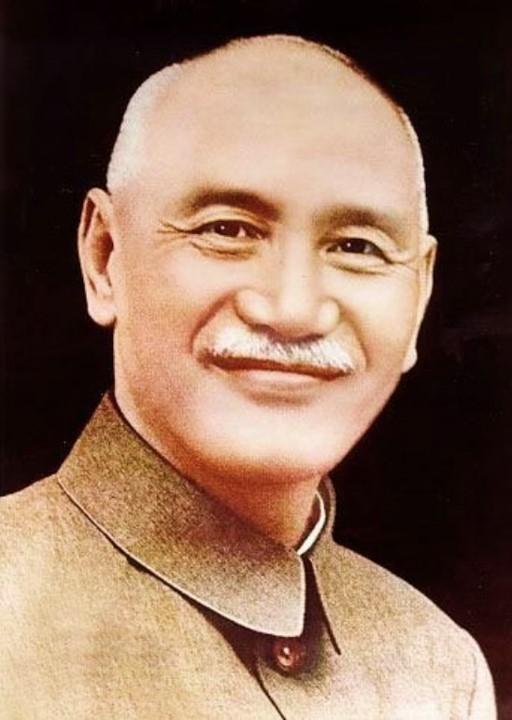
President Chiang Kai-shek

=== Chiang Kai-shek (1945–1975) ===
==== Cross-Strait policy ====
Chiang Kai-shek's retreat to Taiwan following the Chinese Civil War, and the subsequent establishment of the ROC in December 1949, marked the beginning of the One-China party line. In Taiwan, the KMT immediately insisted on its right to maintain the position of the legal representative of all of China. The "government in exile", a term the ROC under Chiang Kai-shek elected to call itself, remained a status recognized by the international community until October 1971, when Taiwan's seat in the UN Security Council was replaced by that of the PRC, and February 1972, which marked Nixon's historical visit to Peking which ended in the Shanghai Communiqué.

Initially, the KMT sought to bide time and strength under US assistance and protection in order to retake the mainland. The outbreak of the Korean War prompted President Truman to order the Seventh Fleet to defend Taiwan against the possibility of invasion on June 27, 1950. Although the US overall goal was not to aid Chiang's return to the mainland, but to build Taiwan into a fortress against communism, it allowed Chiang to pursue his military vision of unification.

As a staunch anti-communist, Chiang pushed his doctrine of pro-unification under the ideology of liberating the mainland from the Communists using force. Hence, the army of civilians, legal specialists, troops, and other skilled workers that came with him viewed Taiwan as a temporary base for building industrial and military strength towards the level necessary to retake the mainland. In August 1955, and later in 1958, Chiang demonstrated his commitment for settling KMT-Chinese Communist Party (CCP) representative rivalry with military force by instigating conflict along the Tachen, Kinmen and Matsu islands in the First Taiwan Strait Crisis. The PROC began shelling the islands in response to Chiang's deployment of approximately 60,000 armed troops into the area, which prompted the Second Taiwan Strait Crisis. In the 1960s smaller skirmishes were accompanied by unconventional strategies aimed at the liberation of China. Chiang Kai-shek deployed planes which dropped leaflets and sent the air force on reconnaissance and espionage missions i.e. blowing up bridges and infrastructure in the mainland. Nevertheless, the 1970s was marked by United Nations General Assembly Resolution 2758, signaling Taiwan's decline in the international community, and with it, the desire to recapture the mainland was replaced by the necessity to survive under the new unstable status quo.

==== Domestic policy ====
The KMT's One-China policy also influenced its governing policy in Taiwan. Dealing with the island's weakening economy after a long period of prosperity under the Japanese, as well as the residents' dissatisfaction of KMT's administration, Chiang Kai-shek decided on consolidating his dominance through an authoritarian political system to stabilize Taiwan's internal affairs, opening path for unification with the mainland.

Structure-wise, the government of Chiang imposed on Taiwan was of little difference than the previous form used to administer mainland China. Almost all of the governmental positions, with the addition of the highest military positions, police, and the educational system, were occupied by mainlanders. Ethnic division in the establishment of the administration system was visible: Hokkien people, the major ethnicity in Taiwan, took control over local governments. Meanwhile, the minority Hakka occupied top positions in bodies such as police and railroads, due to their favorability towards mainlanders. The KMT created a separate government for Taiwan, consisting of five municipalities and sixteen counties, where local residents could exercise voting rights.

A number of progressive social policies were implemented. The government opened more schools and universities, along with organizing a public healthcare plan. The official educational curriculum demanded students learn and speak Mandarin Chinese, while forbidding the use of local languages. However, in exchange for social welfare, benefits were freedom and democratic rights: continuing the Martial Law, which granted extensive power to police and military in case of a "Communist rebellion" Chiang's government throughout the 1950s banned all political activities of the Taiwanese, such as forming parties, publishing newspapers and students' democracy movements. There was little transparency inside the government, as the Legislative Yuan was limited from discussing bureaucratic issues, including but not limited to planning and funding.

The KMT also attempted at maneuvering elections on the local scale: financial assistance and organizational funds were provided for candidates to better run their campaigns. The party pushed forward at least two candidates from different factions in one area, then allowed those factions to take turn holding position in the local bureaucracies. Additional economic advantages were also given to those candidates who agreed to comply with KMT.

==== Economic policy ====
A representative economic policy during the rule of Chiang Kai-shek was the Land Reforms introduced between 1949 and 1953, which had profound effects not only to the agricultural sector, but to the whole economy. Their goal was to change the Japanese colonial laid rental system which promoted unfair distribution of land and contributed to the gap between rich and poor. The reforms aimed at making all farmers the owners of their own fields. The reforms consisted of three stages. First, compulsory reduction of land rent, which limited farm rents to a maximum of 37.5 percent of the annual yield of the main crops. The second stage – sale of public land, that was previously owned and confiscated from Japanese colonists, to actual tenants at a price significantly below market value. The final third stage – the "Land-to-the-Tiller Act", under which land owned by landlords in excess of 2.9 hectares was compulsorily sold to the government, which in turn resold it to tenants. These reforms touched a vast majority of the Taiwanese agricultural population, with 70% of tenant households having their rents reduced in the first stage. The second and third stages also contributed to reducing the land farmed by tenants from 44% in 1949 to 17% in 1953.

Economically, the reforms were important as with the change of ownership, the incentive framework of the cultivator was transformed – promoting an increase of work efforts, production, investment and adoption of new technologies. This rising productivity was necessary for the subsequent transfer of resources – labor and capital, to other sectors of the economy. The reforms also brought an impact to the income distribution, improving the incomes of tenants and new owners. It is argued that such policy of distribution first, and growth later also contributed to the egalitarian growth pattern of the country.

=== Chiang Ching-kuo (1975–1988) ===
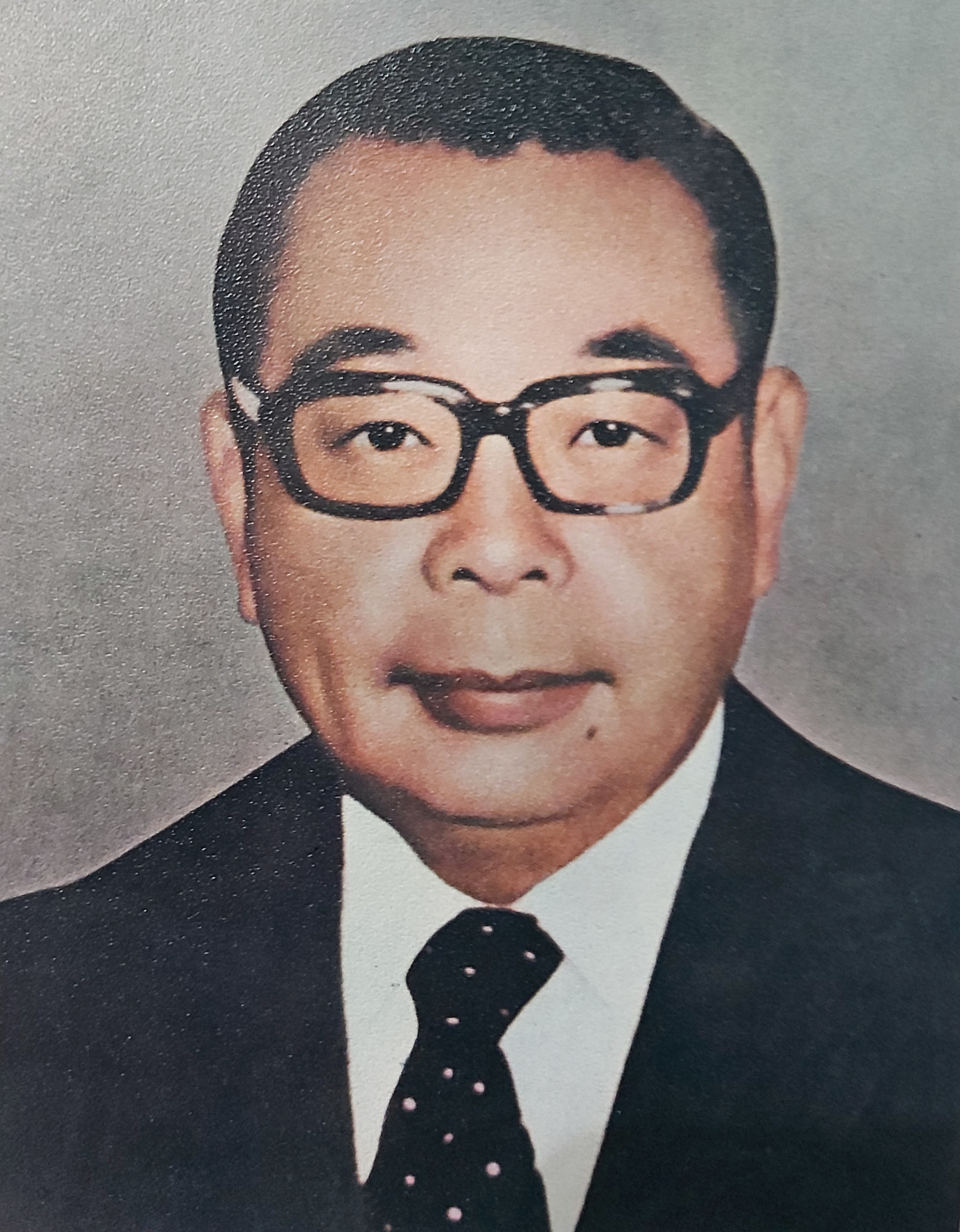
President Chiang Ching-kuo

==== Cross-Strait policy ====
Taiwan under KMT president Chiang Ching-kuo embodied a move towards more flexible Cross-Strait relationship in an era of official diplomatic isolation, launched by the US recognition of the PRC on January 1, 1979. While Chiang Kai-shek's original One-China philosophy maintained Taiwan as its sole legitimate representative, a stance at the time recognized by the international community, his son, confronted by Taiwan's declining international status and the rise of China's power and relevance, could no longer maintain the same hard stance and openly hostile policy. Thus, the KMT under Kuo shifted its interpretation of One-China to the notion of representative rivalry within its current Cross-Strait relations, which expresses Taiwan's necessity to negotiate for its relevance and its concessions made in other foreign arenas in light of the CPP's competing claim of representation.

Under the One-China line, Chiang Ching-kuo negotiated for its own security in order to compete with the PRC's growing power. As such, he filled the void of formal diplomatic ties to other countries with unofficial ties, sharing the modern paradigm of Taiwan's foreign relations. Chiang Ching-kuo's responded bitterly to the severing of official relations in 1979 and the termination of the Mutual Defense Treaty, causing him to reiterate his five principles with regard to ROC-US relations under the banner of "reality, continuity, security, legality, and governmentality". As a result, the United States Congress pushed the Taiwan Relations Act on Oct. 10 the same year. The act was an unofficial brokerage which allowed the US to deal with external threats to Taiwan and to sell arms for the purpose of defense building.

In 1979, the "Three Noes": no contact, no compromise, no negotiation, with the PROC was adopted in response to the ROC's "Three Links" and maintained by President Kuo. However, the hijacking of a Chinese Airline Cargo Plane on May 3, 1986, combined with domestic pressure by citizens demanding to reach the mainland, undid the policy. In 1987, an Open Door policy allowed the ROC Red Cross to issue permits for people from Taiwan to travel to their relatives in the mainland, prompting the start of ongoing civilian exchanges between the ROC and the PRC.

The compromise of "Chinese Taipei" at the 1984 Summer Olympics is a significant example of concessions made during Chiang Ching-kuo's administration. Due to China's complaints regarding the term Chinese Taiwan, and the registering of athletes as Chinese athletes, Taiwan adopted "Chinese Taipei" – a term that silently endorsed the One-China principle, and resembled a compromise of representation to which both parties were satisfied. This was a pragmatic move toward regaining international space for the ROC, one which embodied a move toward unification.

==== Domestic policy ====
In light of growing domestic pro-democracy sentiment, abandonment by the international community – starting from the United States' decision to not recognize the ROC diplomatically, and China's rising power and international status, Chiang Ching-kuo initiated various strategic, limited democratic concessions in order to consolidate KMT authority against internal and external pressures. Doing so would allow the KMT to strategically continue as a strong state under the semblance of democracy, while also enabling the ROC securely allocate attention abroad in negotiating its One-China policy. Ultimately, human rights issues still remained a major controversy in this era, given that Chiang Ching-kuo kept the main policies of his father's reign alive. However, the Martial Law, the product of his father's security concerns of a communist rebellion was eventually lifted in 1987.

Chiang Ching-kuo's gradual switch from ethnic Chinese conservatism to Taiwanese conservatism began with reshuffling the cabinet to include more ethnically Taiwanese members, albeit on a small scale. The next step in this change was to open the political scene for opposite parties, namely Tangwai which had its root in the Taiwanese people. While Chiang Ching-kuo began slowly relaxing restraints on political opposition, "Tang-wai" was already earning large support from local elections in the end of the 1970s; much to the extent that after Kaohsiung Incident in 1979, the KMT initiated stricter surveillance, and capture, of opposition members. As political activism in the 1980s attracted more and more Taiwanese, the KMT government started carrying out open policies to encourage participation of the remaining population, such as including new talents and religious people. A prominent example would be Chiang's decision to pick Lee Teng-hui, an original Taiwanese, to be the country's vice-president in 1982. In, 1986, Chiang Ching-kuo did the unthinkable: he flouted the KMT by allowing the illegal formation of the Democratic Progressive Party (DPP). These policies demonstrate that Chiang Ching-kuo sought to gain international support in order to strengthen his regime, by taking the moral high ground of democratic legitimacy against the rising threat of China. In doing so, he also sought to appease the United States for finance and security reasons.

Another element of Chiang Ching-kuo's era represented the continued exclusion of aboriginal people of Taiwan for fear of polluting Sinocentric national identity. Although the DPP was formed, it was never based on the intention of restoring rights of Aboriginals, but rather as a front to dissipate anger and satisfaction. Furthermore, there were no policies set in motion to return land stolen under Chiang Kai-shek, lift the ban addressing Aboriginal languages, or provide education in schools to continue Aboriginal culture. Only after democratic consolidation occurred after Chiang Ching-kuo, were aboriginal rights restored. In tandem with maintaining a strict Sino-centric identity, as Chiang Ching-kuo and his men were attempting to introduce a new brand of conservatism to the party structure, on the nationwide scale the government was still labeled authoritarian conservative.

==== Economic policy ====
The 1970s was period of rapid economic development for the Taiwanese economy. The government realized that the existing infrastructure was reaching its maximum capacity and was no longer able to accommodate the economy's needs. Chiang Ching-kuo became the driving force behind the proposal of the first post war large-scale infrastructure construction, namely the Ten Major Construction Projects. They included six projects covering highway, rail, sea and air transportation infrastructure, and others – shipbuilding, oil refining, steel manufacturing and nuclear power generation. The work on the projects started in the early 1970s while Chiang was still a Premier and most of the projects were completed by the end of the decade. The construction significantly contributed to mitigating the effects of the 1973 oil crisis, such as spiking unemployment resulting from factory closures. The projects created employment opportunities for 140 000 people and prompted the rapid revival of the economy. They also established a foundation for the Taiwanese increasing export-oriented economy.

Under Chiang's presidency, the Ten Major Construction Projects were followed by the Twelve Major Construction Projects, which included infrastructure projects and expansion of a steel mill. Next, the Fourteen Major Construction Projects were completed, providing essential materials and infrastructure for the expansion of many small and medium enterprises in the countryside, and therefore promoting growth with equity.

=== Lee Teng-hui (1988–2000) ===
==== Cross-Strait policy ====
In handling Cross-Strait affairs, President Lee diverges from the traditional KMT line. Thus, his contributions to Conservatism must be carefully limited to the economy sphere. Indeed, throughout his presidency, Lee rejected the "1992 Consensus" under the claim that China's characterization of Taiwan as a "renegade province" embodied a straw man argument. Instead, he considered Taiwan as having always remained historically independent, under the observation of the San-Francisco Treaty. Such a radical stance worried China to the extent in which military sanctions were used, prompting the outbreak of the Third Taiwan Strait Crisis.

==== Domestic policy ====
Due to being regarded as the pioneer of the liberalization of Taiwanese politics, many internal policies under Lee's presidency did not follow the conservative political line traditional to KMT. During his rule, he actively promoted democracy by removing permanent members of the Legislative Yuan – namely the mainlanders in power since 1949, as well as holding free elections afterwards to include more Taiwanese members. He emphasized his ethnically Taiwanese identity in his rule, crafting a stronger sense of Taiwanese nationalism following his predecessor Chiang Ching-kuo's steps.

==== Economic policy ====
During the 1990s the Taiwanese government actively pursued monitoring and control over the cross-strait investments. Various regulations were implemented, such as requiring all firms that were investing in the mainland to report the amount and the nature of their investments. If they failed to do so, variety of punishments were awaiting – including denying permissions to travel, cutting off credits and exchange operations, denying future investment applications. Regulations also prescribed that new investments over US$1 million would require advance approval, further strengthening the government's ability to oversee the mainland related economic activities.

This period was also marked by a major shift in the Taiwanese investments – from-small scale manufacturing and mostly labor-intensive industries, such as apparel, footwear, food processing, to higher technology production and infrastructure projects. As a result, the value of investments increased greatly, bringing up the government's fears of Taiwan's growing reliance on the mainland. In response, President Lee Teng-hui asserted that the country's excessive dependence upon overseas investment, particularly in the PRC, was diverting capital and attention from revitalizing the domestic economy, and the government might have to put a lid on it. One of the new strategies to diversify Taiwanese investments in other less hostile markets, was the "Go South" policy that encouraged outsourcing production in Southeast Asia. This policy however did not produce the needed results and reduce the investments to the mainland.

Seeing the weaknesses of the "Go South" strategy, the government took another approach introducing the "No Haste, Be Patient" policy. It required case-by-case approvals of Taiwanese investments in high-technology and infrastructure in the mainland. Also, it imposed limits on investments in the PRC – with a maximum investment level of 20 to 40 percent of a firm's total net worth and a ceiling of US$50 million on individual investments. A following regulation also banned Taiwanese investment in most large-scale infrastructure and energy projects. It was argued that the policy's objective was not to stop entirely the movement towards the mainland, but to slow and manage the outflow of high-tech firms and give them the opportunity to develop at home. Lee also claimed that as long as Beijing was being hostile towards Taiwan, such unrestrained investments and excessive reliance on the mainland would undermine the national security.

Lee's policies were met with strong opposition – both from the business levels and the general electorate, which supported closer economic ties with the mainland, in spite of concerns over security threats and pressure from Beijing.

=== Ma Ying-jeou (2008–2016) ===
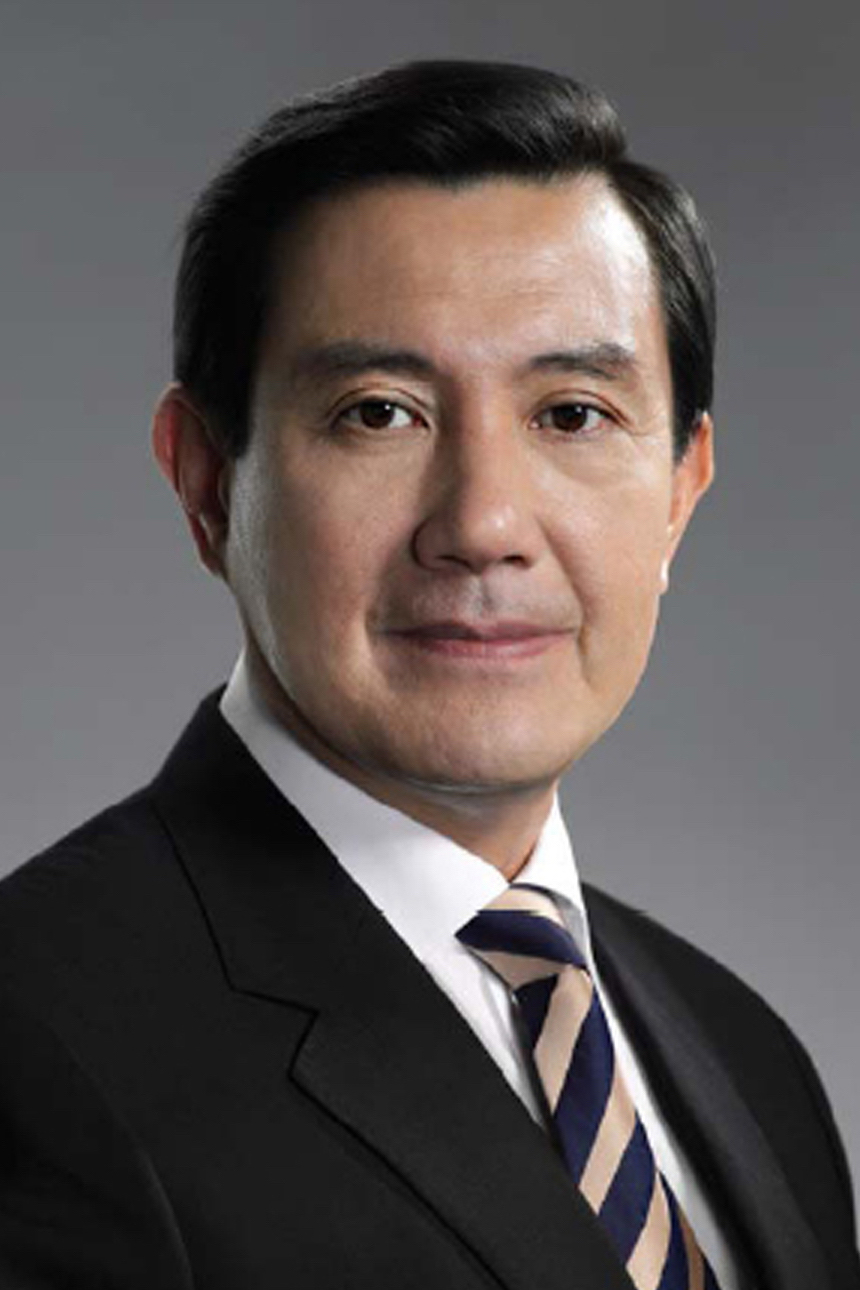
President Ma Ying-jeou

==== Cross-Strait policy ====
Under the presidency of Ma Ying-jeou, the 1992 consensus carried on, allowing Taiwan to silently maintain its representation of One-China. In the context of this stalemate, Ma then turned towards bolstering Taiwan's security and international position by implementing flexible diplomacy. As such, Ma's main vision was to slowly restore the modus vivendi in regard to the growing power and influence of the ROC by scaling down the hostile relationship which had greatly escalated during Lee Teng-hui's and Chen Shui-bian's presidencies. According to the Ministry of Foreign Affairs during Ma's presidency, the consensus represented the ROC's principles of "dignity, autonomy, pragmatism, and flexibility" in foreign affairs. By downplaying hostility towards the PROC in conformity with the stance of the international community, Taiwan was able to secure material goods and security via bilateral relationships, as well as international room.

Most notably, on May 18, 2009, the ROC took part in the 62nd World Health Assembly, a move which marked Taiwan's return to participating in UN institutions since 1971. In accordance with reintegrating Taiwan into the international community, Ma's administration also placed the ROC's inclusion in the United Nations Framework Convention on Climate Change (UNFCCC) and the International Civil Aviation Organization (ICAO) as top priorities. Moreover, since 2009, relations with countries in the Asia Pacific region have also recovered, as evidenced by the Memorandum of Understanding on Aviation Safety Cooperation with Korea and the resumption of deputy minister level economic and trade consultations with Malaysia and the Philippines. The United States, Taiwan's long-standing ally, continued to maintain bilateral relations in the form of assisting in the ROC's national defense: in October 2008, the Bush administration agreed to 6.2 billion dollar arms sales, which was repeated during Obama's presidency.

In June 2013, however, the PRC and the ROC signed the extremely controversial Cross-Strait Services Trade Agreement (CSSTA). Ma administration's efforts of flexible diplomacy, which had not only principally maintained the 1992 consensus, but also brought the PROC and the ROC closer to ever before, induced political backlash as students occupied the National Parliament, demanding a clause by clause review of the agreement. General discontent over Ma's Cross-Strait policy culminated in the election of 2016, which brought the DPP back in power.

==== Domestic policy ====
The winner of 2008 presidential election, Ma Ying-jeou's policies embodied a large state which aggressively shaped domestic politics. These policies however large in scale, were largely challenged by Taiwanese citizens in terms of not only their interventionism, but also their poor efficacy. In addition, several key points of Ma's campaign were promises of anti-corruption and moreover, harmony among ethnicities. However, neither was kept; in particular, one of the first actions he decided on was the re-opening of Chiang Kai-shek Mausoleum, showing an example of how much the previous president still influenced the newly elected president to support cultivating an exclusive national identity on a Sino-centric basis.

Taiwan's economic growth during his first term gained him a large amount of support from big names in business for reelection, thanks to his efforts on economic integration with the mainland; but at the same time a growing number of citizens were enthusiastically participating in social movements to oppose various policy changes that Ma's government put forward. Some of those controversial moves from the authorities were poor management on dealing with aftermath of 2008 tsunami, the Statute for Farm Village Rejuvenation, media control of public television broadcasting, sexual harassment towards children, and the approvement of establishing a naphtha cracker plant near the coast. Furthermore, the government permanently stopped operation of the previous DPP-supported civic and environmental structures, causing the loss of communication channels between the government and the public. All those policies reflected a relatively conservative perspective due to the presence of a large, albeit unpopular state, financed by big business, which in particular during Ma's era, undermined human rights and environmental issues.

==== Economic policy ====
Unlike the previous KMT government under the presidency of Lee Teng-hui, which attempted to reduce the mainland related economic activities, Ma Ying-jeou focused on development in cooperation with China to reap trade benefits. Following the growing desires and the increasing pressure from the business community, a few weeks after Ma's inauguration he initiated talks between Taiwan and the mainland regarding the issue of the Three Direct Links. These are the three main paths of communication between Taiwan and PRC – via mail, transportation and commerce, which were banned between the two sides for almost six decades. The absence of the three links has been a huge barrier for Taiwanese businesses, increasing shipment costs and obstructing access to a potentially large market, low labor costs and talent pool in the mainland. It also prevented investment and development of multinational companies back in Taiwan.

Finally, on November 4, 2008, the two sides signed series of agreements regarding each link and Three Direct Links were established. The successful talks mark a historic moment signifying that cross-Strait relations have moved past hostility towards negotiation and cooperation. The opposition has been sceptical, repeatedly claiming that while such move might be economically beneficial for Taiwan, it is compromising the national security with Taiwanese airports being open to PRC aircraft. In reality however, because of this development, cross-strait relations have increasingly become oriented towards rapprochement rather than confrontation.

Another economic policy of Ma's government is the Economic Cooperation Framework Agreement. Signed in 2010, the Agreement aims to reduce tariffs and commercial barriers between the two-sides, with the hope for much-needed boost to Taiwan's economy. Yet, it was not received well by the public, giving start of protests and a fierce public debate over the effects of the agreement. Opponents have expressed concerns for the future of the local economy, as Taiwanese workers and small businesses would have to compete with increasing imports of cheaper Chinese goods. At the heart of the protests however, has been the fear that the ECFA might be led to unification with Beijing, which sees the island as a Chinese province. The President has asserted that the deal is about economics, not politics, and has affirmed his confidence over Taiwanese democracy and its ability to fend off undue pressure from the PRC.

=== Post-Ma ===
In 2022, the KMT had substantial success in the mayoral races.

== Leadership gallery ==
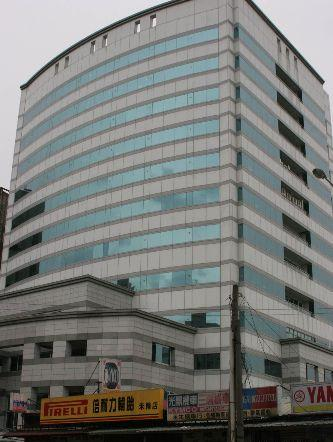
The Kuomintang headquarters in Taipei City.

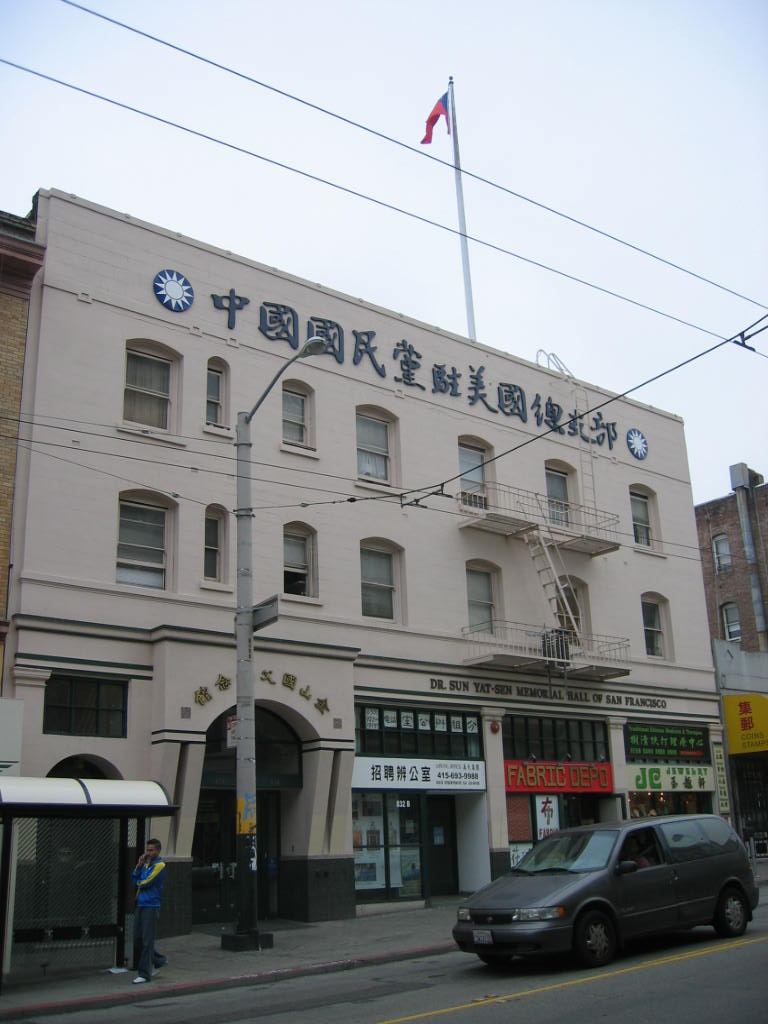
The KMT maintains offices in all the major Chinatowns of the world. Its United States party headquarters are located in San Francisco Chinatown, directly across from the Chinese Six Companies.

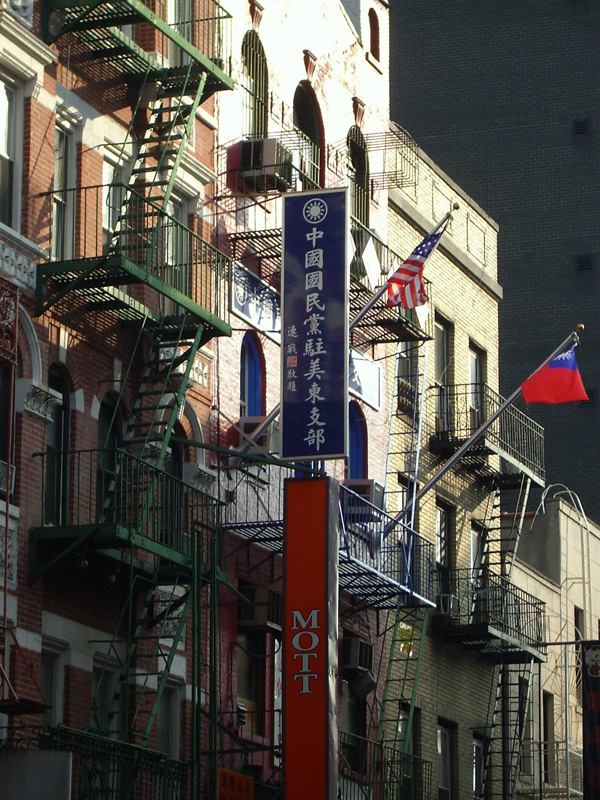
The Kuomintang Eastern U.S. headquarters is in New York Chinatown.

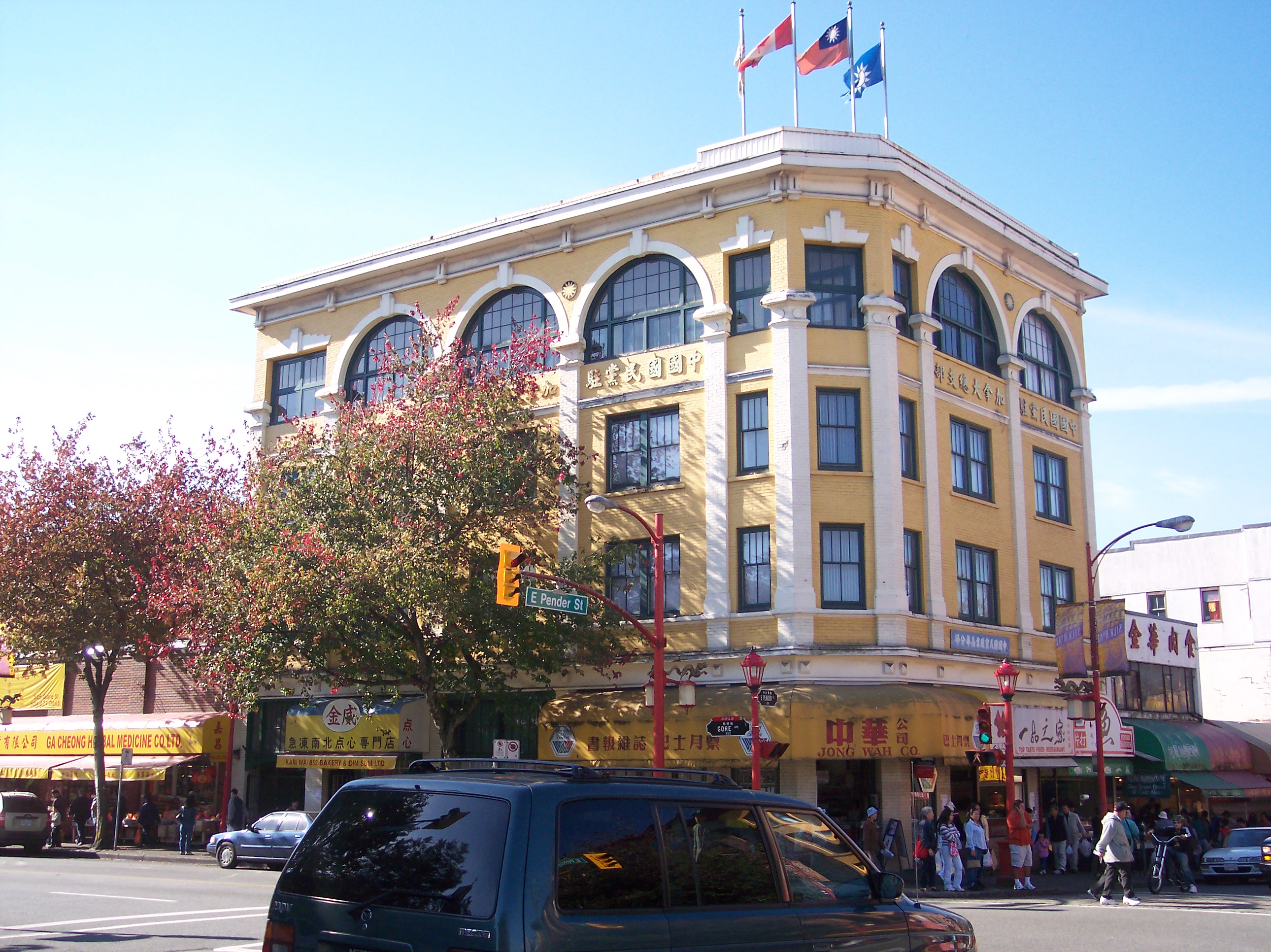
KMT Building in Vancouver's Chinatown, BC, Canada

== See also ==
- Gexin movement
- History of the Republic of China
- Politics of Taiwan
- List of political parties in Taiwan
- Kuomintang-Nanjing

== Sources ==
- Strand, David (2002). "Chapter 2:Citizens in the Audience and at the Podium". In Goldman, Merle; Perry, Elizabeth (eds.). Changing Meanings of Citizenship in Modern China. Cambridge, Massachusetts, United States: Harvard University Press. pp. 59–60. ISBN 978-0-674-00766-6.
