= Ko-hsin movement =

1944–1947 Political faction within KMT

The Gexin movement or Ko-hsin movement (simplified Chinese: 党政革新运动; traditional Chinese: 黨政革新運動; pinyin: Dǎng Zhèng Géxīn Yùndòng; lit. 'Party and Government Innovation Movement') was a political faction formed in 1944 within China's Kuomintang party. Composed largely of members of the CC Clique and Whampoa group, the movement's members opposed what they viewed as bureaucratic tendences and corruption within the KMT and sought to purge the party. By August 1947, the Gexin movement ceased to be an effective political force.

== Composition ==
The Gexin movement was a political faction formed in 1944 within China's Kuomintang party. It formed in response to the weakening of the Nationalist government, which was experiencing war weariness and a deteriorating economy. It was largely composed of younger Kuomintang members, particularly those associated with the Whampoa group or the CC Clique.

Initially, the group did little other than discuss their mutual dissatisfaction with the direction of the Nationalist government. Its initial members were part of the CC Clique, and the group began expanding outside of the CC Clique in advance of the Twelfth Plenum of the Kuomintang's Executive Committee, including with members of the Whampoa and Youth Corps factions. A number of these subsequent members had been leaders in the Blue Shirts Society during the 1930s.

== Political stances ==
The members of the Gexin movement were forceful of their criticisms of the government during the plenary session of the Kuomintang's Central Executive Committee on May 21, 1944. Chiang Kai-shek thereafter invited members of the group to meet with him regarding their views of political reform, which members of the group initially viewed as a political victory. However, Chiang did not act on any of the recommendations, later indicating that the Japanese Operation Ichigo offensive had taken political reform off the table until the KMT's Sixth Party Congress where it would be considered again.

Through the remainder of 1944 and into 1945, the Gexin movement continued to agitate for reform and develop its contacts with influential figures in the KMT.

At both the Sixth Party Congress in May 1945 and in the Second Plenum in 1946, the Gexin movement called for purging the KMT of bureaucratism, factionalism, and bureaucratic capitalism via a general review of party membership.

The Gexin movement strongly opposed H.H. Kung in the period leading to Kung's resignation. It viewed Kung as incompetent, indecisive, and lacking a progressive spirit.

The Gexin movement opposed the Sino-Soviet treaty negotiated in the final days of the Second Sino-Japanese War. It opposed the proposal for a post-war coalition government between the Nationalists and the Communists which George C. Marshall unsuccessfully sought to broker during the Marshall Mission.

The Gexin movement was a major political force within the KMT in early 1947. It was among the most aggressive critics of T.V. Soong following the Nationalist government's financial crisis in early 1947. The group emphasized his bureaucratic capitalism, a phrase likely adopted from the communists' criticisms of Soong. The Gexin movement influenced many newspapers' criticisms of Soong. The group's criticisms of Soong were also echoed in the Legislative Yuan.

== End of movement ==
After March 1947, the political power of the Gexin movement decreased. In August 1947, the movement stopped publishing its official journal and the group ceased to be an effective political force. Some of its members, however, continued to coordinate legislative activities.

Historian Lloyd Eastman attributes the Gexin movement's disintegration to a lack of success in effectuating reform or purging the KMT as well as increasing rivalry between members of the Youth Corps faction and the CC Clique members. Eastman writes that although the Gexin movement criticized factionalism within the KMT, the movement itself "had been simply another faction within the disorderly constellation of factions known as the Nationalist regime."
