= Sheila Robinson (publisher) =

American businesswoman

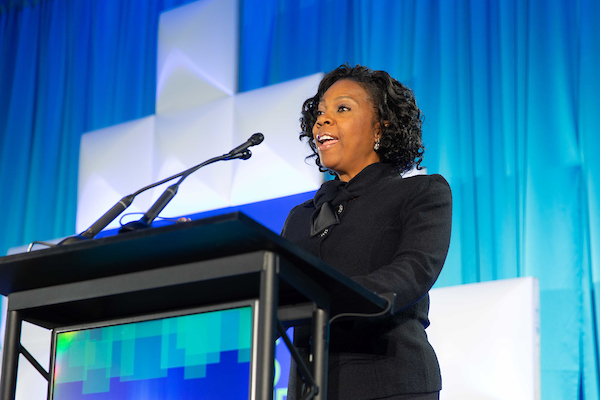
- Born: North Carolina, United States
- Education: University of Pennsylvania
- Occupations: Founder, publisher, and CEO
- Known for: Founder of Diversity Woman Magazine

Sheila Robinson is an American businesswoman, author, and founder and CEO of Diversity Woman Media, based in Burlington, North Carolina. Robinson has been featured on the cover of Publishing Executive Magazine and named one of 50 Top Women in Magazine Publishing for the significant contribution she has made in her industry. She was also filmed for induction into “The History Makers,” the nations largest African American video oral history collection. Robinson is the author of two books: Lead by Example: An Insider's Look at How to Successfully Lead in Corporate America and Entrepreneurship (2014), and Your Tool Kit for Success: The Professional Woman's Guide for Advancing to the C-Suite (2017).

== Early life and education ==
Robinson was born in Winston-Salem, North Carolina, and cites Johnnetta Cole, President Emerita of Spelman College and Bennett College for Women as an important personal role model. Robinson holds a bachelor's degree in Pre-Law from North Carolina Central University, a master's degree in Entrepreneurship from Western Carolina University and a Masters and Doctorate of Education from the University of Pennsylvania in Talent Management and Women's Leadership. Her dissertation, “Leadership Perspectives on Advancing Women to the C-Suite,” point to a dynamic set of factors that play a primary role in propelling aspiring women into the C-Suite.

Additionally, she holds certificates from Stanford University's Professional Publishing Program (2007), Wharton's School of Business Chief Learning Officer Program (2013) and Cornell University's Diversity and Inclusion Program (2019). In 2017 she became a Certified Executive Coach and member of the International Coach Federation, the world's largest community of professionally trained coaches and is an advisor to CEO's and CHRO's. She is a member of the Delta Sigma Theta service sorority.

== Career ==
After a corporate career with R.J. Reynolds and DuPont (including serving as marketing director with DuPont's textile division), Robinson decided to launch a professional magazine for women seeking career advancement opportunities. Her first venture into publishing was in 2005 with the regional magazine North Carolina Career Network. In 2008, she created Diversity Woman Media, publishing the magazine, Diversity Woman. Diversity Woman Media also hosts a variety of conferences, including Business and Leadership, Health and Wellness, and Diversity Equity. Robinson's media appearances include radio, television and print with outlets such as: Fox News, E! Entertainment, Yahoo! Finance, The Business Journal, California News, Women's Wear Daily, and The WS Chronicle.

== Awards and recognition ==
In 2009, she was honored with a Mid-Eastern Athletic Conference Image Award for her career achievements and for being a positive role model for young women. Also in 2009, she was named one of the Top 50 Women in Magazine Publishing by Publishing Executive. Robinson was honored as the Greensboro Chamber of Commerce Minority Business Person of the Year in 2011. Her Diversity Woman magazine was nominated for The 2011 North Carolina Small Business of The Year. In 2013, she was among the honorees at a high-profile Washington, D.C. gala, “Emancipation of Capital.” The event was held to coincide with the 50th Anniversary of The March on Washington.

== Works ==
  Books

- Your Tool Kit for Success: The Professional Woman's Guide for Advancing to the C-Suite
- Lead by Example: An Insider's Look at How to Successfully Lead in Corporate America and Entrepreneurship
- Redefining Your Life D.I.E.T.: Transform How You Look, Feel, and Perform

  Articles

- HuffPost: "What We Can Learn From Women Who Have Held a Seat in the C-Suite"
- Huffpost: "How Research Behind Women's Leadership Shows That Clinton Could Be a Great President"
- LinkedIn: "Equity Is Key for the Future of the Workplace"
- LinkedIn: "Your Own Path to the C-Suite"
- Diversity Woman: "Phenomenal Woman, Phenomenal Journey: An Interview with Maya Angelou"
