= Sanzhuang Township, Hebei =

Coordinates: 38°04′45″N 114°26′44″E

Sanzhuang Township 西三庄乡
- Township

Chinese transcription(s)
- Interactive map of Sanzhuang Township
- Country: China
- Province: Hebei
- Prefecture: Shijiazhuang
- District: Xinhua District
- Time zone: UTC+8 (China Standard Time)

Sanzhuang Township (Chinese: 西三庄乡) is a township-level division of Xinhua District, Shijiazhuang, Hebei, China.

== See also ==
- List of township-level divisions of Hebei
