= Dongjiao Subdistrict, Shijiazhuang =

Dongjiao Subdistrict 东焦街道
- Subdistrict
- Location in Hebei
- Coordinates: 38°03′11″N 114°28′04″E
- Country: People's Republic of China
- Province: Hebei
- Prefecture-level city: Shijiazhuang
- District: Xinhua
- Village-level divisions: 6 residential communities 1 village
- Elevation: 81 m (266 ft)
- Time zone: UTC+8 (China Standard)
- Postal code: 050081
- Area code: 0311

Dongjiao Subdistrict (simplified Chinese: 东焦街道; traditional Chinese: 東焦街道; pinyin: Dōngjiāo Jiēdào) is a subdistrict of Xinhua District, in the heart of Shijiazhuang, Hebei, People's Republic of China. As of 2011, it has 6 residential communities (社区) and 1 village under its administration.

== See also ==
- List of township-level divisions of Hebei
