= Beiyuan station =

Beiyuan station may refer to:

== Beijing Subway ==
- Bei Yuan station, on Line 13
- Beiyuanlubei station, on Line 5
- Tongzhou Beiyuan station, on Batong line (through operation to Line 1)

== Others ==
- Beiyuan station (Xi'an Metro), a station on Line 2 of Xi'an Metro
- Beiyuan station (Jinan Metro), a station on Line 2 of Jinan Metro
