= Beiyuan Subdistrict, Shijiazhuang =

Beiyuan Subdistrict 北苑街道
- Subdistrict
- Location in Hebei
- Coordinates: 38°03′51″N 114°26′22″E
- Country: People's Republic of China
- Province: Hebei
- Prefecture-level city: Shijiazhuang
- District: Xinhua
- Village-level divisions: 4 residential communities
- Elevation: 83 m (272 ft)
- Time zone: UTC+8 (China Standard)
- Postal code: 050081
- Area code: 0311

Beiyuan Subdistrict (Chinese: 北苑街道; pinyin: Běiyuàn Jiēdào) is a subdistrict of Xinhua District, Shijiazhuang, Hebei, People's Republic of China, located in the western part of the city. As of 2011, it had 4 residential communities (社区) under its administration.

== Translation ==
The English literal translation of 北苑 (Běi yuàn) is "North" (北, Běi) "Court" (苑, Yuàn). Though 苑 could also mean "Garden" or "Park".

== See also ==
- List of township-level divisions of Hebei
