= Lynn Tilton =

American entrepreneur (born 1959)

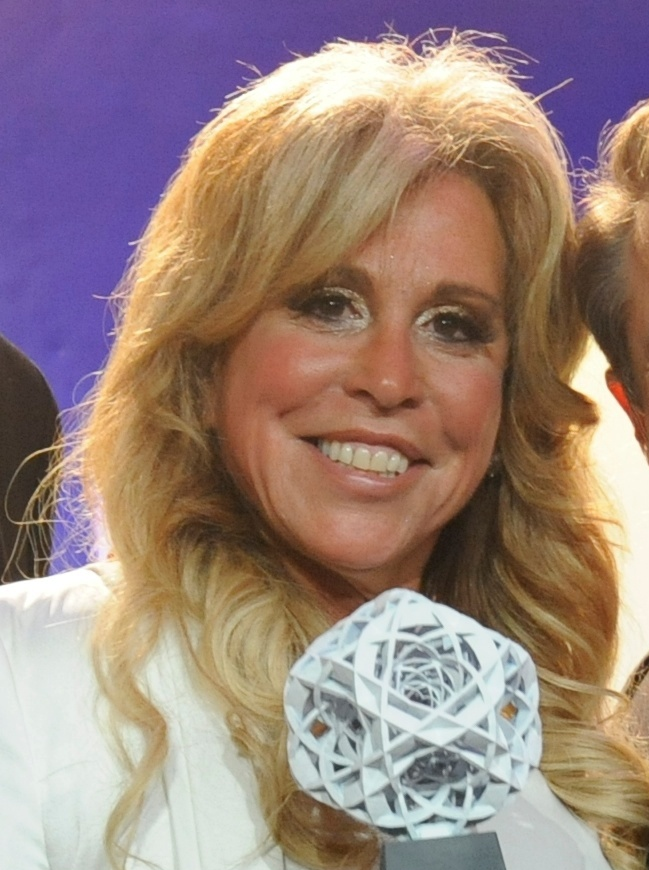
- Tilton in 2013
- Born: Lynn Garfinkle; April 22, 1959 (age 67); The Bronx, New York
- Education: Teaneck High School
- Alma mater: Yale University (B.A., American Studies, 1981); Columbia Business School
- Occupations: Collateralized loan obligation manager, business owner
- Known for: CEO of Patriarch Partners
- Spouse: Kevin Wayne Tilton (divorced in 1995 in Florida)

Lynn G. Tilton (born April 22, 1959) is an American businesswoman and collateralized loan obligation (CLO) creator, owner and manager. She is the chief executive officer and sole principal of Patriarch Partners, LLC and its affiliated entities, a holding company managing 75 companies. She worked for Goldman Sachs and Merrill Lynch as an investment banker.

== Early life and education ==
Tilton was born in The Bronx and raised in Teaneck, New Jersey, where she attended Teaneck High School and played on the tennis team before graduating in 1977. Her father, Jerry Garfinkle, was a New York City schoolteacher and a strong influence on her. He died of a brain tumor during her junior year in college. She states that she comes from a long line of Kabbalah scholars. She obtained a BA degree in American studies from Yale University in 1981 and an MBA degree in Finance from Columbia University.

== Career ==
Tilton began her career at Morgan Stanley in 1981. After completing her MBA she moved first to Goldman, Sachs followed by Kidder Peabody and finally ended up at Merrill Lynch as an investment banker until 1989. Tilton was an executive at Long Drive Management Trust, a special situations investment fund, and executive managing director of Papillon Partners, Inc., a firm which she founded to offer customized research, valuation, and execution services to sellers of bank loans and high yield bonds.

By 1998, she had decided to retire from her job as a partner at Amroc Investments. She returned to New York from Costa Rica in 2000 and formed a partnership with Dennis Dolan from Nomura. They had purchased a portfolio of distressed commercial loans and packaged them into a CLO at a time when they were new. As the economy improved, the securities issued by Patriarch grew in value. Since 2000, through Patriarch Partners' affiliated funds, Tilton has had ownership in and restructured more than 240 companies with combined revenues of $100 billion. She is the former chairman and CEO of MD Helicopters, Inc., a manufacturer of commercial and military helicopters, and the acting CEO of Dura Automotive Systems, a Tier 1 supplier to automotive and transportation industry OEMs, and CEO of Stila, a cosmetics company.

In October 2011, Tilton was interviewed by Barbara Walters for a 20/20 special. She appears periodically on CNBC and is an occasional contributor to The Huffington Post.

== Awards and accolades ==
On January 21, 2011, Tilton was honored as "Aviation Entrepreneur of the Year" at the 8th Annual Living Legends of Aviation Awards ceremony at the Beverly Hilton in Beverly Hills, CA. She was recognized for her leadership in the successful turnaround of Patriarch portfolio company MD Helicopters (MDHI)

On December 18, 2012, Diversity Woman Magazine awarded Tilton the Mosaic Women Legend Award for her efforts in saving American jobs. The award was presented at the National Diversity Woman Business Leadership Conference.

On September 5, 2014, Tilton was awarded the Intercollegiate Tennis Association (ITA) Achievement Award at the ITHF Board of Directors Meeting at the Grand Hyatt Hotel in New York. The ITA Achievement Award pays tribute each year to past participants in the world of varsity tennis who have achieved excellence in their chosen careers. The spirit of the award honors both professional success and contributions to society, made either as a direct result of a career or through humanitarian efforts.

== Controversy ==
In March 2015, the U.S. Securities and Exchange Commission (SEC) charged Tilton with defrauding her collateralized loan obligation (CLO) investors. She filed a lawsuit against the SEC on April 1, 2015, to stop the SEC from pursuing the charges against her. On September 27, 2017, an SEC judge dismissed the charges.

In June 2016, an article in The New York Times attributed the collapse of TransCare, a provider of ambulance services, directly to Patriarch and Tilton.

== Personal life ==
According to Patriarch Partners' website, Tilton married Kevin Wayne Tilton during her junior year at Yale and divorced in 1995 in Florida. They had one daughter. Tilton lives in Middletown, New Jersey, and Highland Beach, Florida.
