= Taiping =

Taiping, Tai-p’ing, or Tai Ping most often refers to:

== Chinese history ==
=== Historical eras ===
- Taiping (256–258), era name used by Sun Liang, emperor of Eastern Wu
- Taiping (409–430), era name used by Feng Ba, emperor of Northern Yan
- Taiping (485–491), era name used by Yujiulü Doulun, khan of Rouranro
- Taiping (556–557), era name used by Emperor Jing of Liang
- Taiping (617–622), era name used by Lin Shihong
- Taiping (1021–1031), era name used by Emperor Shengzong of Liao
- Taiping (1356–1358), era name used by Xu Shouhui

=== Other uses in Chinese history ===
- Princess Taiping (died 713), Tang dynasty princess
- Taiping Rebellion (1850–1864), civil war in southern China
  - Taiping Heavenly Kingdom (1851–1864), the rebel government during the Taiping Rebellion
- Taiping Prefecture, a prefecture during the Ming and Qing dynasties
- SS Taiping (1926), a steam ship used by the Royal Navy
- Taiping (steamer), a Chinese steamer that sank in 1949

== Places ==
=== Subdistricts in China ===
- Taiping Subdistrict, Dalian, in Pulandian District, Dalian, Liaoning
- Taiping Subdistrict, Suzhou, in Xiangcheng District, Suzhou, Jiangsu
- Taiping Subdistrict, Wenling, in Wenling, Zhejiang
- Taiping Subdistrict, Linyi, in Hedong District, Linyi, Shandong
- Taiping Subdistrict, Chaozhou, in Xiangqiao District, Chaozhou, Guangdong
- Taiping Subdistrict, Zhaotong, in Zhaoyang District, Zhaotong, Yunnan
- Taiping New City Subdistrict, in Anning, Yunnan

=== Towns in China ===
- Taiping, Tongliang District, Chongqing, in Tongliang District, Chongqing
- Taiping, Dianjiang County, in Dianjiang County, Chongqing
- Taiping, Zhao'an County, in Zhao'an County, Fujian
- Taiping, Nanping, in Nanping, Fujian
- Taiping, Zhenyuan County, Gansu, in Zhenyuan County, Gansu
- Taiping, Guangzhou, in Guangzhou, Guangdong
- Taiping, Shixing County, in Shixing County, Guangdong
- Taiping, Zhanjiang, in Zhanjiang, Guangdong
- Taiping, Yangshan County, in Yangshan County, Guangdong
- Taiping, Qingyuan, in Qingyuan, Guangdong
- Taiping, Luoding, in Luoding, Guangdong
- Taiping, Xinxing County, in Xinxing County, Guangdong
- Taiping, Teng County, in Teng County, Guangxi
- Taiping, Nanning, in Nanning, Guangxi
- Taiping, Chongzuo, in Chongzuo, Guangxi
- Taiping, Liucheng County, in Liucheng County, Guangxi
- Taiping, Lingshan County, in Lingshan County, Guangxi
- Taiping, Pingguo County, in Pingguo County, Guangxi
- Taiping, Harbin, in Harbin, Heilongjiang
- Taiping, Jixian County, in Jixian County, Shuangyashan, Heilongjiang
- Taiping, Xixia County, in Xixia County, Henan
- Taiping, Guangshui, in Guangshui, Suizhou, Hubei
- Taiping, Zaoyang, in Zaoyang, Hubei
- Taiping, Ningyuan County, in Ningyuan County, Hunan
- Taiping, Shimen County, in Shimen County, Hunan
- Taiping, Jiangsu, in Sihong County, Jiangsu
- Taiping, Jiangxi, in Nanchang, Jiangxi
- Taiping, Changchun, in Changchun, Jilin
- Taiping, Lishu County, in Lishu County, Jilin
- Taiping, Panshan County, in Panshan County, Liaoning
- Taiping, Jingyang County, in Jingyang County, Shaanxi
- Taiping, Juye County, in Juye County, Shandong
- Taiping, Zoucheng, in Zoucheng, Shandong
- Taiping, Jiyang County, in Jiyang County, Shandong
- Taiping, Chengdu, in Chengdu, Sichuan
- Taiping, Wanyuan, in Wanyuan, Sichuan
- Taiping, Lushan County, Sichuan, in Lushan County, Sichuan
- Taiping, Gulin County, in Gulin County, Sichuan
- Taiping, Xingwen County, in Xingwen County, Sichuan
- Taiping, Xichong County, in Xichong County, Sichuan
- Taiping, Jiangyou, in Jiangyou, Sichuan
- Taiping, Zizhong County, in Zizhong County, Sichuan
- Taiping, Huili County, in Huili County, Sichuan
- Taiping, Leshan, in Leshan, Sichuan
- Taiping, Tianjin, in Tianjin
- Taiping, Yao'an County, in Yao'an County, Yunnan
- Taiping, Yingjiang County, in Yingjiang County, Yunnan
- Taiping, Shidian County, in Shidian County, Yunnan

=== Townships in China ===
- Taiping Township, Gansu, in Jingchuan County, Gansu
- Taiping Township, Mishan, in Mishan, Heilongjiang
- Taiping Township, Wudalianchi, in Wudalianchi, Heilongjiang
- Taiping Township, Zhaodong, in Zhaodong, Heilongjiang
- Taiping Township, Henan, in Xiayi County, Henan
- Taiping Township, Guangshui, a former township in Guangshui, Suizhou, Hubei
- Taiping Township, Hefeng County, in Hefeng County, Enshi, Hubei
- Taiping Township, Chenzhou, in Chenzhou, Hunan
- Taiping Township, Hongjiang, in Hongjiang, Hunan
- Taiping Township, Ji'an, Jilin, in Ji'an, Jilin
- Taiping Township, Yongji County, Jilin, in Yongji County, Jilin
- Taiping Township, Changtu County, in Changtu County, Liaoning
- Taiping Township, Fuxin County, in Fuxin Mongol Autonomous County, Liaoning
- Taiping Township, Shandong, in Dongying, Shandong
- Taiping Township, Anyue County, in Anyue County, Sichuan
- Taiping Township, Mao County, in Mao County, Sichuan
- Taiping Township, Mianyang, in Mianyang, Sichuan
- Taiping Township, Panzhihua, in Panzhihua, Sichuan
- Taiping Township, Pingshan County, Sichuan, in Pingshan County, Sichuan
- Taiping Township, Zhongjiang County, in Zhongjiang County, Sichuan
- Taiping Township, Yunnan, in Yangbi Yi Autonomous County, Yunnan
- Taiping Township, Zhejiang, in Lishui, Zhejiang
- Taiping, Hongjiang (太平乡), a township of Hongjiang City, Hunan

=== Other places ===
- Taiping, Perak, a municipality in Perak, Malaysia
- Taiping Island, the largest of the Spratly Islands controlled by Republic of China on Taiwan
- Taiping Mountain, a mountain in Datong Township, Yilan County, Republic of China on Taiwan
- Taiping Lake (Anhui), a lake in Anhui, People's Republic of China on Mainland
- Taiping River, a river in Hebei, People's Republic of China on Mainland
- Taiping District, Taichung, a district in Taichung, Republic of China on Taiwan
- Taiping District, Fuxin, a district in Fuxin, Liaoning, People's Republic of China on Mainland

== Other uses ==
- Taipingjing, Taoist "Scriptures of the Great Peace"
- China Taiping Insurance Holdings, a Chinese insurance conglomerate
- Harbin Taiping International Airport, an airport in Harbin, Heilongjiang, China
- Tai Ping Estate, a public housing estate in Sheung Shui, Hong Kong
- ROCS Tai-ping (太平), name of the USS Decker destroyer escort ship after being transferred to the Republic of China

== See also ==
- Tai Ping Shan (disambiguation)
- Taiping Lake (disambiguation)
- Typing
