= Harbin Flood Control Victory Memorial Tower =

Monument in Harbin, China

The Harbin People's Flood Control Victory Memorial Tower, also known as the Flood Control Victory Memorial Tower or the Flood Control Memorial Tower, is one of the municipal cultural relics protection units of Harbin. It is located in Daoli District, Harbin, Heilongjiang Province. In 1957, Harbin faced the threat of a major flood. Local residents worked to build embankments and successfully held back the flood. Government authorities decided to build a memorial tower on the Songhua River embankment to commemorate the event. The top and body of the tower contain human figures and reliefs, respectively, depicting scenes of resistance against the flood. The design plan underwent several revisions during construction. The memorial tower was completed in 1958 and became one of Harbin's landmark buildings. It narrowly escaped destruction during the Cultural Revolution. Later, the Flood Control Memorial Tower underwent several rounds of repairs. In 1995, it became a municipal cultural relics protection unit of Harbin, and in 1997 it was visited by Russian President Boris Yeltsin.

== History ==
=== Construction process ===
In 1957, a major flood occurred on the Songhua River, threatening the safety of Harbin. Residents of Harbin worked to build embankments and successfully held back the flood. To commemorate this event, the Harbin Municipal Committee of the Chinese Communist Party and the Harbin Municipal People's Government decided to build a memorial tower on the Songhua River embankment.The memorial tower cost 127,000 yuan and was built by the Harbin Second Construction Engineering Company.Harbin Second Construction Engineering CompanyConstruction of the memorial tower began in 1958.Construction of the memorial tower began in 1958.

The municipal government widely solicited opinions on the location of the memorial tower, resulting in three proposals: the intersection of Central Street and the axis of the road on top of the embankment; the top of the slope of the Songhua River embankment; and a plan in which the lower colonnade of the tower would be aligned with the edge of the embankment-top road, with the tower body placed close to Central Street. After repeated discussions, Harbin mayor Lü Qi'en decided to adopt the third proposal.After the site was selected, the issue of the tower's orientation arose. Since construction of the surrounding colonnade was about to begin, the responsible personnel built one fewer column on each side so that the orientation could later be adjusted without affecting the construction schedule. Later, Lü Qi'en personally inspected the site and decided that the front of the memorial tower should face Central Street.

During the construction of the memorial tower, designers needed to make plaster molds for the sculptures on the tower body. This required clay with good viscosity that would not deform or crack after drying, and fire clay fully met these requirements. To ensure that the demand could be met, the responsible unit bought up all the fire clay available for purchase in Harbin, buying more than 7,000 kilograms of it, which temporarily caused a shortage.After the sculptures were completed, the remaining fire clay was transferred to the infrastructure department for the production of refractory bricks, easing the shortage of clay.In addition, the exposed-aggregate finish on the columns of the memorial tower's circular corridor required white cement. At the time, neither the Harbin Cement Plant nor the Mudanjiang Cement Plant produced white cement, and neither was willing to produce a small quantity separately. The responsible unit therefore sent personnel to Suzhou Cement Plant to purchase five tons of white cement, which was transported by air to Harbin._

=== After completion ===
The Harbin People's Flood Control Victory Memorial Tower was completed in 1958, although the exact completion date is disputed. One account gives October 1, while another says it was completed on the eve of National Day. Its inauguration ceremony was held on September 6, 1960.on September 6, 1960.

During the subsequent Cultural Revolution, Lü Qi'en was subjected to criticism and struggle, and the memorial tower nearly suffered destruction.In 1966, a "rebel group" from a school in Harbin broke into the Harbin Urban and Rural Construction Committee three times and questioned whether the memorial tower contained an image of Lü Qi'en.Wang Lisheng, chief engineer of the committee, worried that the memorial tower might be destroyed, and firmly denied this. He pointed out that even if the figure on the memorial tower looked similar to Lü Qi'en, it was merely coincidental, and that Lü Qi'en, as mayor, could not possibly have had time to serve as a model.The "rebel group" was satisfied with his answer, and the memorial tower remained unharmed.

Since then, the Flood Control Memorial Tower has undergone several repairs. For example, in August 1995, the Harbin municipal government invested 200,000 yuan to repair the memorial tower, restore its original appearance, and add lighting decorations.In 1995, the Harbin Municipal People's Government designated the Flood Control Memorial Tower as a municipal cultural relics protection unit of Harbin.In 1997, Boris Nikolayevich Yeltsin, then president of Russia, visited Harbin. Because more than ten thousand White Russians in Harbin had once participated in flood control work, Yeltsin specially visited the Flood Control Memorial Tower and bowed to it.

In 1998, Harbin was again struck by a major flood, with water levels even higher than those of 1957. A total of 400,000 soldiers and civilians participated in flood control work and successfully responded to the flood.To commemorate this event, some Harbin residents proposed building a new monument, while others suggested engraving the names of flood control participants and the numbers of the participating military and police units on the memorial tower. In the end, the municipal government decided to add the 1998 flood water level to the memorial tower.

In 2008, the Daoli District government and other departments jointly held a symposium to commemorate the 50th anniversary of the completion of the Harbin People's Flood Control Victory Memorial Tower.The following year, the Flood Control Memorial Tower received the New China Urban Sculpture Construction Achievement Award.In 2012, the Flood Control Memorial Tower was repaired again.

== Structure and design ==
=== Current appearance of the memorial tower ===
The Harbin People's Flood Control Victory Memorial Tower is located in the center of Stalin Park. It is 22.5 meters high and consists of the tower top, tower body, and tower base.

At the top of the memorial tower are four 3.5-meter-high human figures, representing a worker, a farmer, a People's Liberation Army soldier, and a female intellectual, holding up a red flag. This symbolizes the people of Harbin jointly building embankments and fighting the flood under the leadership of the Chinese Communist Party.In the middle of the tower body is a 2.2-meter-high relief of human figures, depicting a total of 24 people. The scenes include taking an oath before going to the embankment, preventing and controlling the flood, and celebrating victory.The tower also has a golden round tube marking the water level of the 1998 flood, which was 120.89 meters.The base of the memorial tower is square, narrower at the top and wider at the bottom, and is built of stone, symbolizing the firmness of the embankment. On the front of the base are gilded characters reading "Harbin People's Flood Control Victory Memorial Tower".

In front of the tower base is a fountain, symbolizing the people of Harbin successfully turning floodwater into a water source that benefits the people. Below it are two levels of pools. The upper level marks the highest water level of the 1957 flood, 120.30 meters, while the lower level marks the highest water level when Harbin was flooded in 1932, 119.72 meters. In 1990, a sound-controlled colored fountain was installed in the pool.

Around the outside of the memorial tower stand 20 Corinthian columns connected by broad bands, forming a Roman-style semicircular colonnade 35 meters long. This symbolizes the indestructible strength of the people of Harbin in the 20th century.At both ends of the colonnade are stone walls 3.5 meters high and 2.5 meters wide. The stone wall on the east side depicts scenes of Harbin residents successfully fighting the flood, while the stone wall on the west side shows people of various ethnic groups marching forward with slogans raised. On the backs of the stone walls are inscriptions recounting the history of flood control in Harbin.

=== Development of the design plan ===
In the earliest design plan, the memorial tower was only 21.9 meters high. However, after construction had already begun, some experts suggested that the tower was too low in relation to its surrounding environment, and therefore recommended increasing its height to 30 meters.At that time, construction of the tower's base had already begun. Increasing the tower's height would have required narrowing the tower body, which would have made it difficult to arrange the human sculptures at the top. After repeated consideration, the responsible personnel decided to increase the height of the memorial tower to 22.5 meters.

The human sculptures at the top of the tower initially followed the convention of using a woman to represent the peasantry. However, this farmer sculpture was criticized as lacking strength, so the designers changed the farmer to a male figure and made the female figure represent an intellectual.The female intellectual was initially designed as a barefoot woman with rolled-up trouser legs and a towel wrapped around her head, but this plan did not receive support. Lü Qi'en proposed revising her image. When the designers reviewed the draft, they found that the redesigned female intellectual was too short and appeared physically weak, so they instead used a female student athlete as the model.When the sculptures were nearly complete, some people argued that the posture of the worker figure at the top of the tower could cause political misunderstanding. However, by then the figure already had a steel reinforcement frame and had been cast in concrete, making major changes difficult. After consultation among experts, it was decided to separate the five fingers of the figure, which had originally been close together, changing them into a naturally bent form, while also modifying the outline of the arm.

The reliefs on the tower body were created by teachers and students of an art academy, with sculptor Wang Ximin serving as the chief creative director.At the time, the Harbin Municipal Committee of the Chinese Communist Party required that the main sculpture display the images of workers, peasants, soldiers, students, and merchants, known as "workers, peasants, soldiers, students, and merchants", and that it must show the leadership of the working class.The students therefore conceived a composition in which a worker holding a flag stood in front, followed by the other four types of people. However, this composition looked crowded, and the image of the merchant was difficult to portray. As a result, Ren Zhongyi, first secretary of the Harbin Municipal Committee of the Chinese Communist Party, decided to retain only "workers, peasants, and soldiers" in the relief.The relief ultimately contained 24 figures.Among these figures was a cadre. Some sculptors believed that the image of the cadre should be based on Lü Qi'en. Although the person in charge agreed with this suggestion, he worried that Lü Qi'en would object. Therefore, he did not inform Lü Qi'en of the decision, and the sculptors modeled the figure based on a photograph of Lü Qi'en.

== Cultural influence ==
The Flood Control Memorial Tower is regarded as one of Harbin's landmark buildings. In 1964, Heilongjiang painter Sun Yuntai created an oil painting depicting the appearance of the memorial tower. The painting later participated in the National Art Exhibition and became the only work from Heilongjiang in that exhibition.In 2012, the memorial tower was selected as an image for the inside pages of the passport of the People's Republic of China.
