= Shangzhi (disambiguation) =

Shangzhi is a city in Harbin, Heilongjiang, China.

Shangzhi may also refer to:

- Shangzhi (1094–1096), reign period of Gao Shengtai who ruled present-day Yunnan as an emperor
- Shangzhi Town, Shangzhi City
- Shangzhi Township, Chaoyang County, Liaoning, China
- Shangzhi Subdistrict, Daoli District, Harbin, Heilongjiang, China

== See also ==
- Zhao Shangzhi (1908–1942), Chinese general after whom the places are named
