= Xianjie Subdistrict =

- Subdistrict

Chinese transcription(s)
  - Simplified: 县街街道
  - Traditional: 縣街街道
  - Pinyin: Xiànjiē Jiēdào
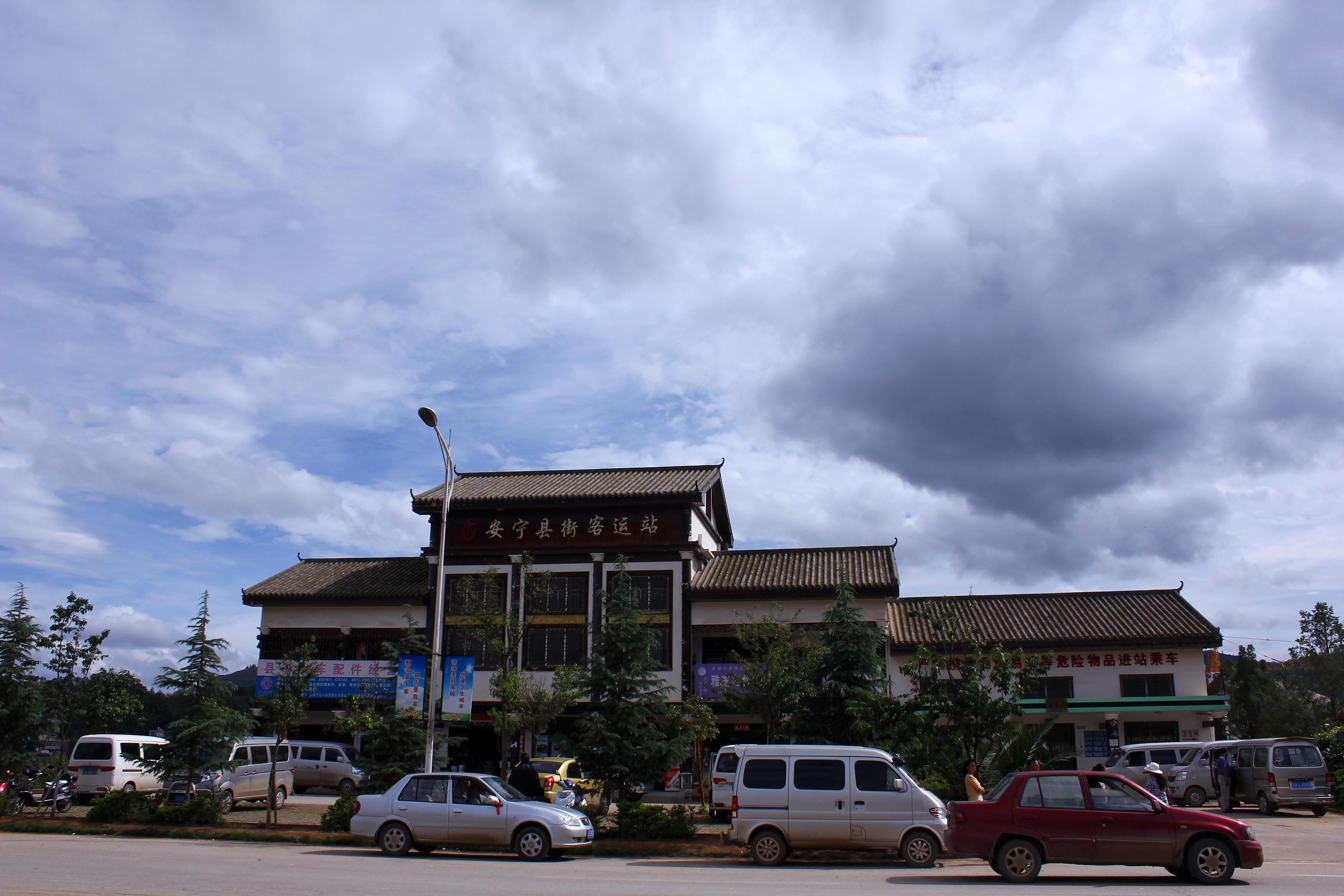

- Location within Yunnan
- Coordinates: 24°51′28″N 102°25′10″E
- Country: China
- Province: Yunnan
- Prefecture-level city: Kunming
- County-level city: Anning City

Area
  - Total: 266 km^{2} (103 sq mi)

Population
  - Total: 28,300
  - Density: 106/km^{2} (276/sq mi)
- Time zone: UTC+8 (China Standard)
- Postal code: 650304
- Area code: 0871

Xianjie Subdistrict (Chinese: 县街街道; pinyin: Xiànjiē Jiēdào) is a subdistrict situated in southern Anning City, Yunnan province, southwestern China. It lies about 8 km west of Anning City, situated on the west bank of the Mingyi River. Formerly a town, its status changed to a subdistrict of Anning in 2011.
