= Qionglong Subdistrict, Anning, Yunnan =

Qinglong Subdistrict
- Subdistrict

Chinese transcription(s)
  - Simplified: 青龙街道
  - Traditional: 青龍街道
  - Pinyin: Qīnglóng
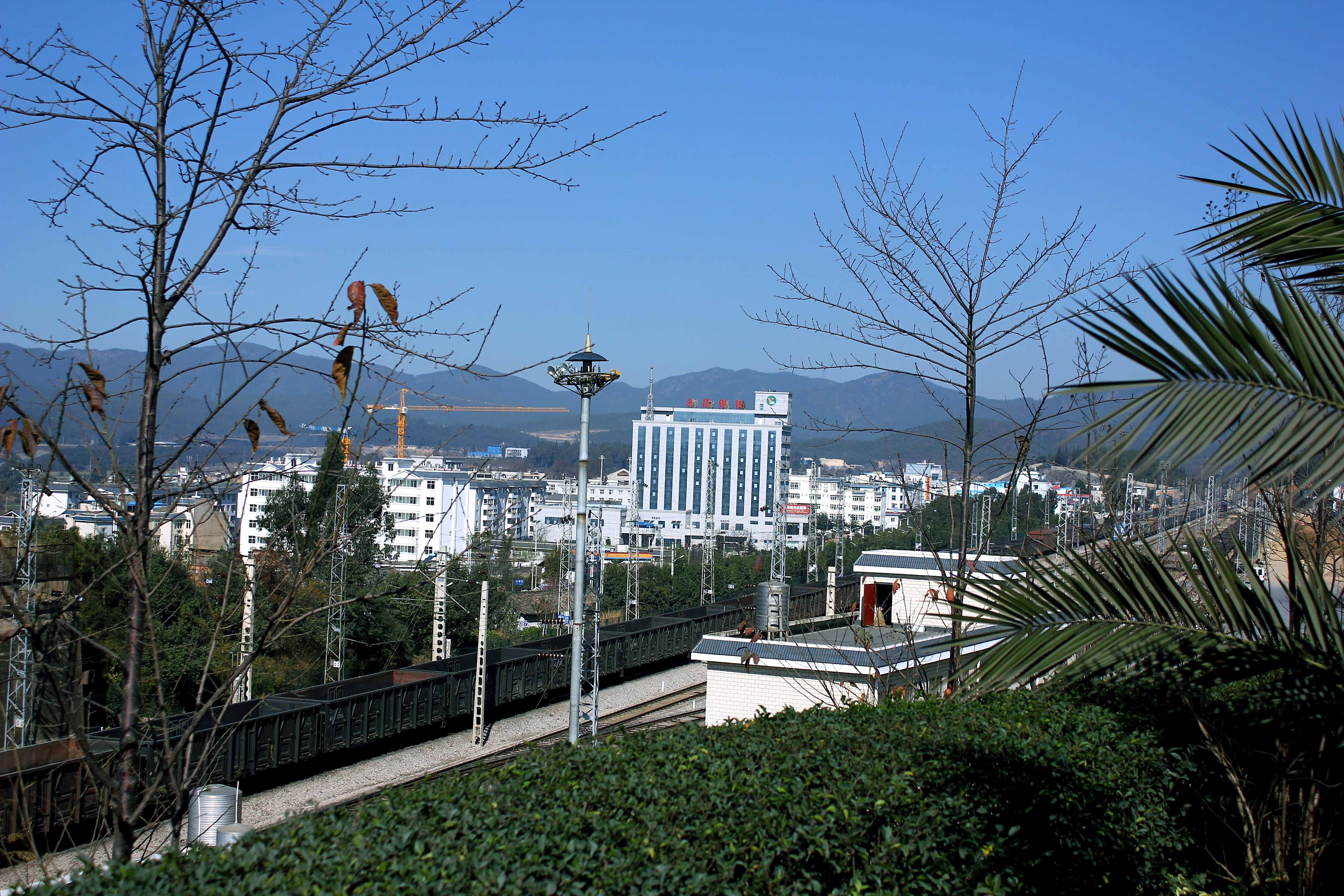

- Location within Yunnan
- Coordinates: 25°01′07″N 102°19′41″E
- Country: China
- Province: Yunnan
- Prefecture-level city: Kunming
- County-level city: Anning City

Area
  - Total: 138 km^{2} (53 sq mi)

Population
  - Total: 12,000
  - Density: 87/km^{2} (230/sq mi)
- Time zone: UTC+8 (China Standard)
- Postal code: 650308
- Area code: 0871

Qinglong Subdistrict (Chinese: 青龙街道; pinyin: Qīnglóng Jiēdào) is a subdistrict situated in northern Anning City, Yunnan province, southwestern China. It lies about 60 km west of Kunming, situated on the east bank of the Tanglang River. Formerly a town, its status changed to a subdistrict of Anning in 2011.
