= Wenquan Subdistrict, Anning, Yunnan =

Wenquan Subdistrict
- Subdistrict

Chinese transcription(s)
  - Simplified: 温泉街道
  - Traditional: 溫泉街道
  - Pinyin: Wēnquán Jiēdào
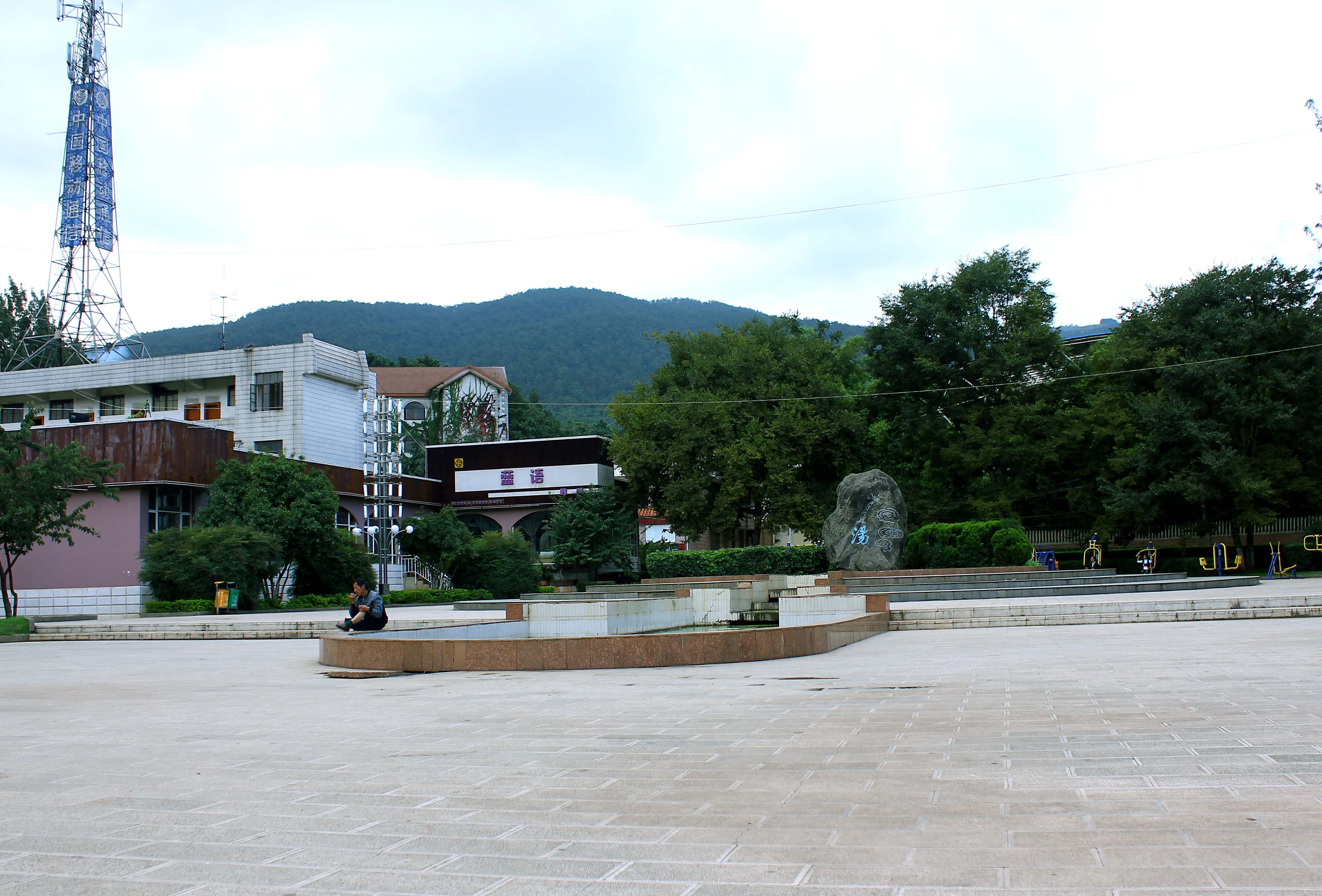

- Location within Yunnan
- Coordinates: 24°57′43″N 102°27′01″E
- Country: China
- Province: Yunnan
- Prefecture-level city: Kunming
- County-level city: Anning City

Area
  - Total: 109 km^{2} (42 sq mi)

Population
  - Total: 12,100
  - Density: 111/km^{2} (288/sq mi)
- Time zone: UTC+8 (China Standard)
- Postal code: 650307
- Area code: 0871

Wenquan Subdistrict (Chinese: 温泉街道; pinyin: Wēnquán Jiēdào) is a subdistrict situated in northern Anning City, Yunnan province, southwestern China. It lies about 8 km north of Anning City, situated on the bank of the Tanglang River. Formerly a town, its status changed to a subdistrict of Anning in 2011. The town is named for its hot spring.
