= Jinfang Subdistrict =

- Subdistrict

Chinese transcription(s)
  - Simplified: 金方街道
  - Traditional: 金方街道
  - Pinyin: Jīnfāng Jiēdào
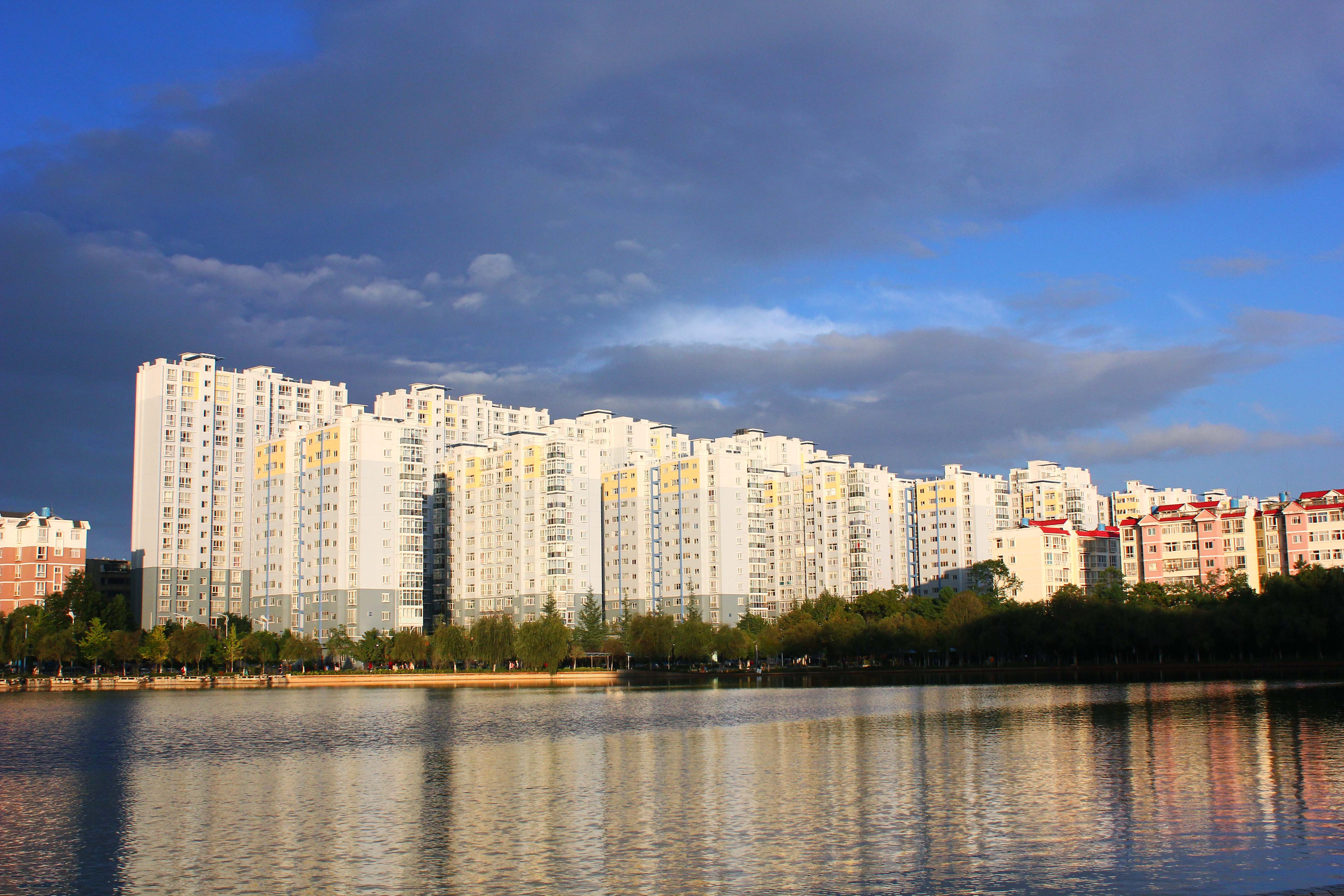

- Location within Yunnan
- Coordinates: 24°54′12″N 102°29′49″E
- Country: China
- Province: Yunnan
- Prefecture-level city: Kunming
- County-level city: Anning City

Area
  - Total: 76.92 km^{2} (29.70 sq mi)

Population (2008)
  - Total: 91,859
  - Density: 1,194/km^{2} (3,093/sq mi)
- Time zone: UTC+8 (China Standard)
- Postal code: 650302
- Area code: 0871

Jinfang Subdistrict (Chinese: 金方街道; pinyin: Jīnfāng Jiēdào) is a subdistrict situated in Anning City, Yunnan province, southwestern China. It is a southeastern district of the city of Anning. Formerly it was a part of Lianran Town, Anning City. The Lianran Town is divided into two subdistricts: Lianran and Jinfang in 2008. Lianran Subdistrict is situated 3 km northwest of Jinfang.
