= Mingyi River =

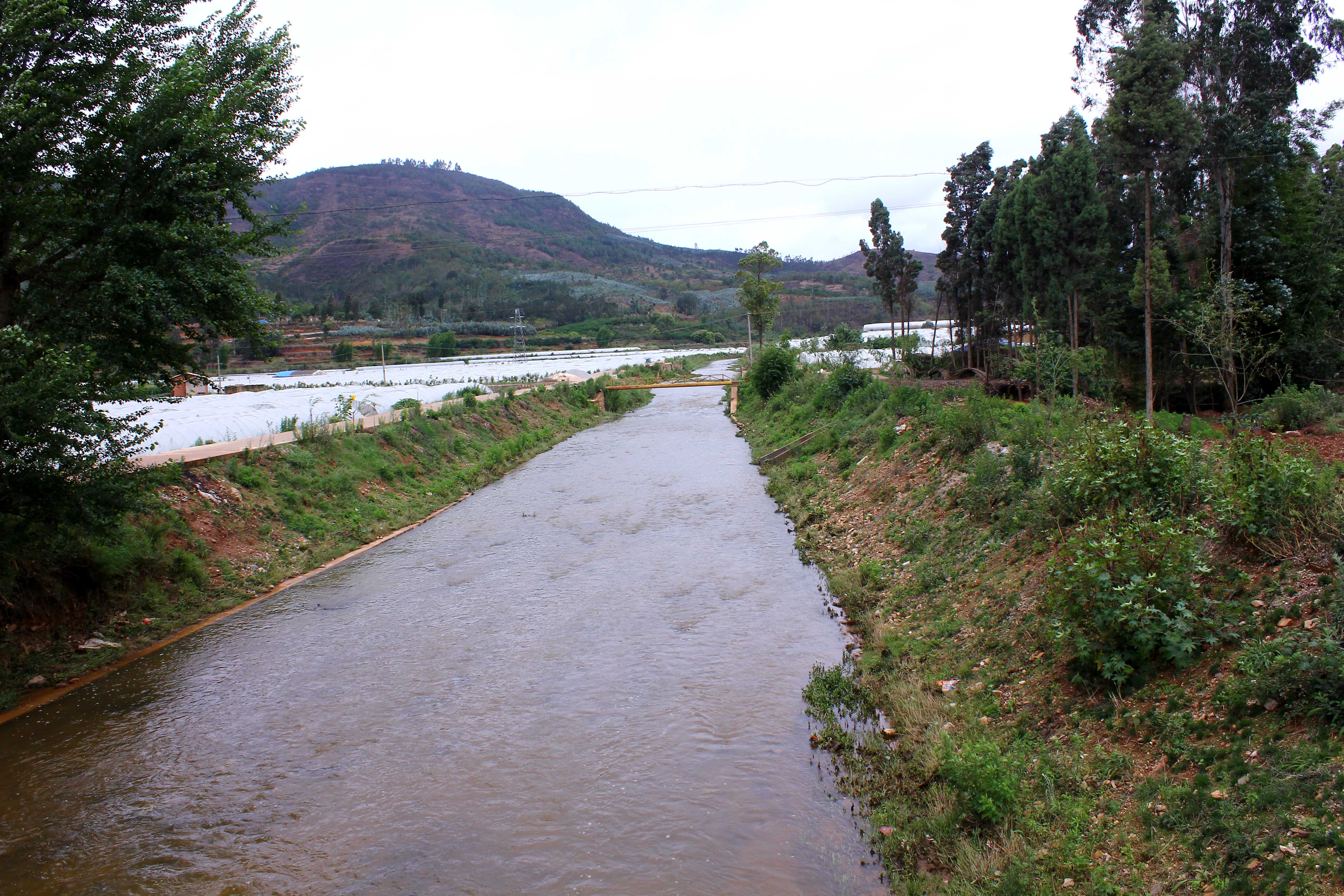
- Mingyi River near Diandong Village, Anning City

Location
- Country: People's Republic of China

Physical characteristics
- Source
  - location: Southwestern Jinning County, Yunnan Province
- Mouth
  - location: Tanglang River, Anning City, Yunnan Province
- Length: 77 km (48 mi)
- Basin size: 908 km^{2} (351 sq mi)

The Mingyi River (Chinese: 鸣矣河; pinyin: Míngyǐ Hé) is a tributary of the Tanglang River in Yunnan province, southwestern China. The river rises in southwestern Jinning County and the upper stream is called the Chemu River (Chinese: 车木河; pinyin: Chēmù Hé) . Another stream rises in the far south of Anning City. These two streams flow together near Bajie, and from there the Mingyi flows north through southern Anning City into Tanglang River. The total length of the Mingyi is 77 km.
