= Chaoyang County =

Coordinates: 41°26′N 120°10′E

Chaoyang 朝阳县
- County
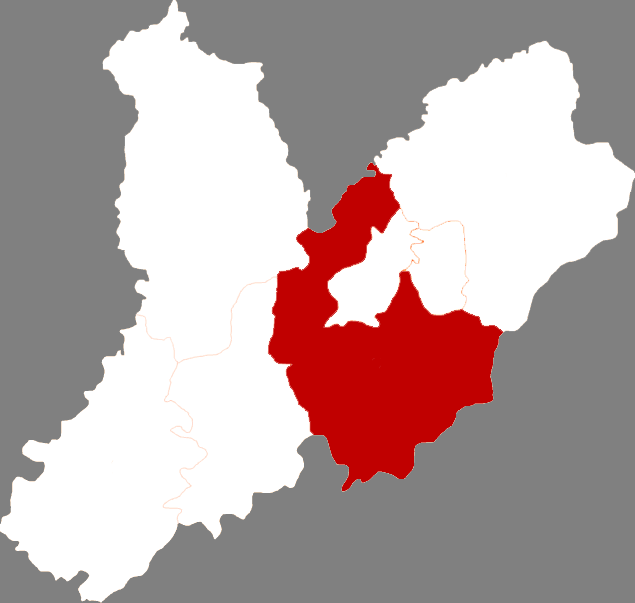
- Location in Chaoyang City

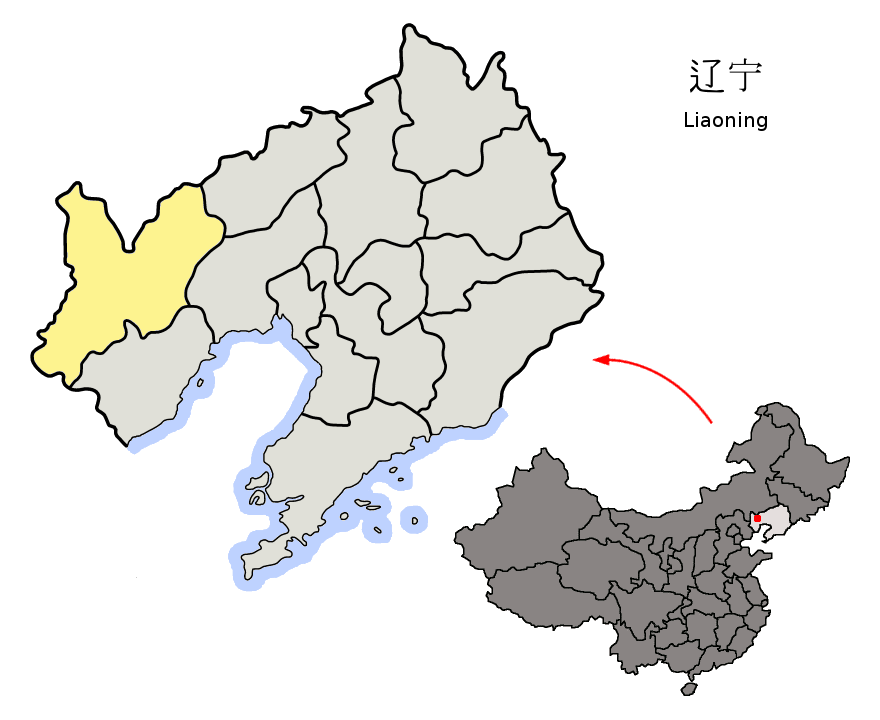
- Chaoyang City in Liaoning
- Country: People's Republic of China
- Province: Liaoning
- Prefecture-level city: Chaoyang

Area
  - Total: 3,751 km^{2} (1,448 sq mi)

Population (2020 census)
  - Total: 404,460
  - Density: 107.8/km^{2} (279.3/sq mi)
- Time zone: UTC+8 (China Standard)

Chaoyang County (simplified Chinese: 朝阳县; traditional Chinese: 朝陽縣; pinyin: Cháoyáng Xiàn; lit. 'Facing the Sun') is a county of northwestern Liaoning province, China. It is under the administration of Chaoyang city.

== Administrative divisions ==
There is 1 Subdistrict, 14 towns and 12 townships in the county.

Subdistrict:

- Liucheng (柳城街道)

Towns:

- Damiao (大庙镇), Wafangzi (瓦房子镇), Liujiazi (六家子镇), Dapingfang (大平房镇), Boluochi (波罗赤镇), Mutouchengzi (木头城子镇), Ershijiazi (二十家子镇), Yangshan (羊山镇), Gushanzi (古山子镇), Nanshuangmiao (南双庙镇), Taizi (台子镇), Qingfengling (清风岭镇), Shengli (胜利镇), Qidaoling (七道岭镇)

Townships:

- Lianhe Township (联合乡), Dongdatun Township (东大屯乡), Beigoumen Township (北沟门乡), Beisijiazi Township (北四家子乡), Wulanhe Township (乌兰河硕乡), Dongdadao Township (东大道乡), Heiniuyingzi Township (黑牛营子乡), Gende Township (根德乡), Wangyingzi Township (王营子乡), Shangzhi Township (尚志乡), Songlingmen Township (松岭门乡)

Jiajiadian Farm (贾家店农场)

== Climate ==
Climate data for Yangshan Town, elevation 184 m (604 ft), Chaoyang County (1991–2020 normals, extremes 1991–present)
Month	Jan	Feb	Mar	Apr	May	Jun	Jul	Aug	Sep	Oct	Nov	Dec	Year
Record high °C (°F)	15.1 (59.2)	20.3 (68.5)	29.5 (85.1)	35.6 (96.1)	40.9 (105.6)	40.4 (104.7)	42.4 (108.3)	40.1 (104.2)	36.2 (97.2)	32.0 (89.6)	23.0 (73.4)	13.4 (56.1)	42.4 (108.3)
Mean daily maximum °C (°F)	−0.7 (30.7)	3.6 (38.5)	10.9 (51.6)	19.5 (67.1)	26.0 (78.8)	28.9 (84.0)	30.4 (86.7)	29.7 (85.5)	25.9 (78.6)	18.5 (65.3)	8.2 (46.8)	0.8 (33.4)	16.8 (62.2)
Daily mean °C (°F)	−9.8 (14.4)	−5.0 (23.0)	2.9 (37.2)	11.9 (53.4)	18.8 (65.8)	22.4 (72.3)	24.6 (76.3)	23.3 (73.9)	17.7 (63.9)	10.0 (50.0)	0.5 (32.9)	−7.4 (18.7)	9.2 (48.5)
Mean daily minimum °C (°F)	−17.0 (1.4)	−12.3 (9.9)	−4.4 (24.1)	4.3 (39.7)	11.2 (52.2)	16.2 (61.2)	19.7 (67.5)	18.1 (64.6)	10.7 (51.3)	2.7 (36.9)	−6.0 (21.2)	−13.9 (7.0)	2.4 (36.4)
Record low °C (°F)	−34.2 (−29.6)	−28.0 (−18.4)	−20.5 (−4.9)	−9.0 (15.8)	−0.1 (31.8)	5.7 (42.3)	10.9 (51.6)	5.4 (41.7)	−2.5 (27.5)	−10.3 (13.5)	−24.4 (−11.9)	−28.9 (−20.0)	−34.2 (−29.6)
Average precipitation mm (inches)	1.9 (0.07)	2.4 (0.09)	5.5 (0.22)	23.1 (0.91)	47.1 (1.85)	96.9 (3.81)	145.5 (5.73)	115.5 (4.55)	38.4 (1.51)	21.5 (0.85)	10.6 (0.42)	1.8 (0.07)	510.2 (20.08)
Average precipitation days (≥ 0.1 mm)	1.3	1.3	2.1	4.4	6.8	10.9	10.6	8.6	5.7	4.2	2.6	1.3	59.8
Average snowy days	1.8	1.9	1.8	0.9	0	0	0	0	0	0.5	2.3	2.1	11.3
Average relative humidity (%)	51	45	41	41	48	66	78	79	71	60	55	53	57
Mean monthly sunshine hours	195.1	200.8	234.4	238.2	258.5	222.2	200.3	222.0	227.8	218.7	183.9	179.4	2,581.3
Percentage possible sunshine	66	66	63	59	58	49	44	53	62	64	63	63	59
Source: China Meteorological AdministrationOct all-time record low
