= Daoli, Harbin =

Daoli 道里区
- District
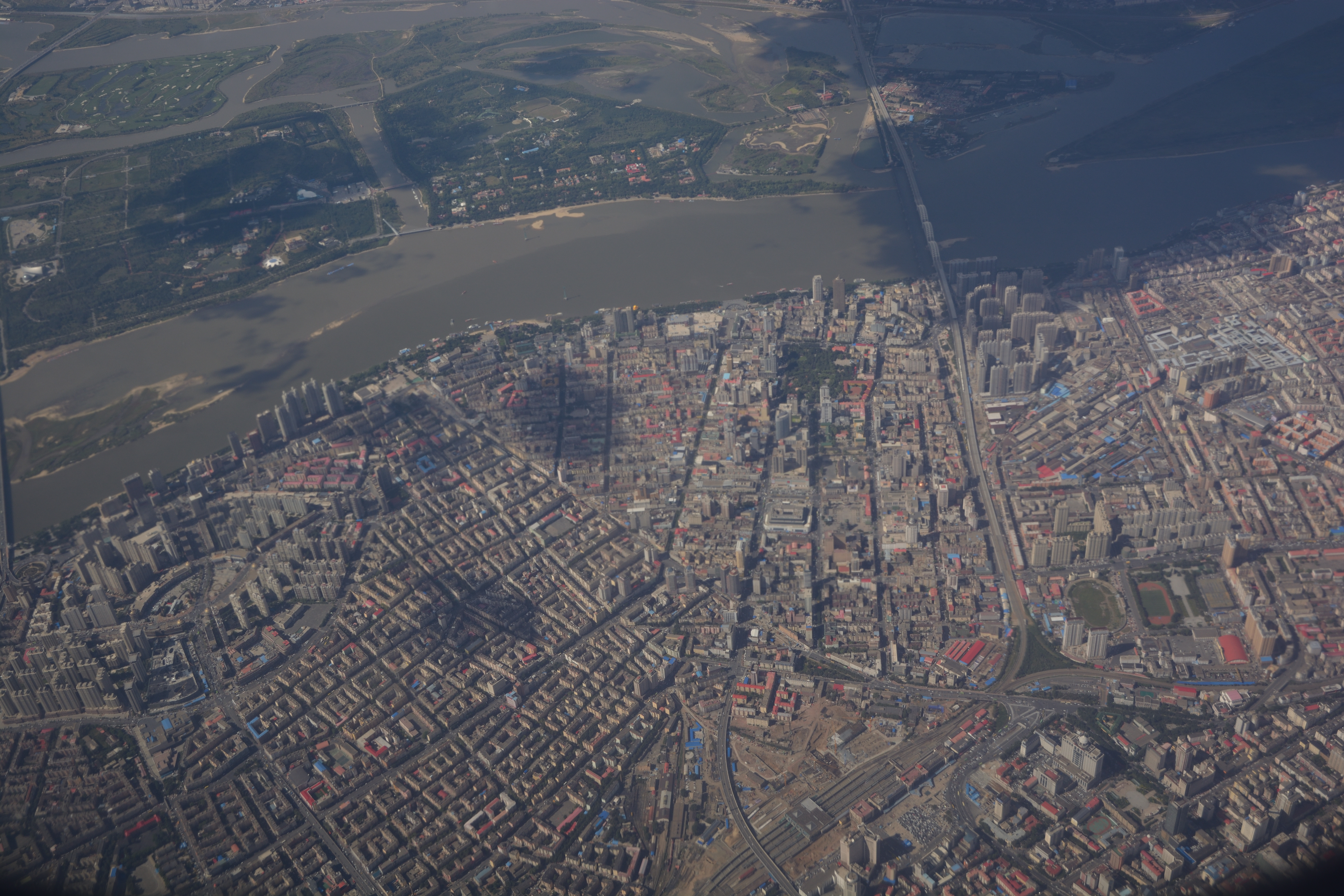

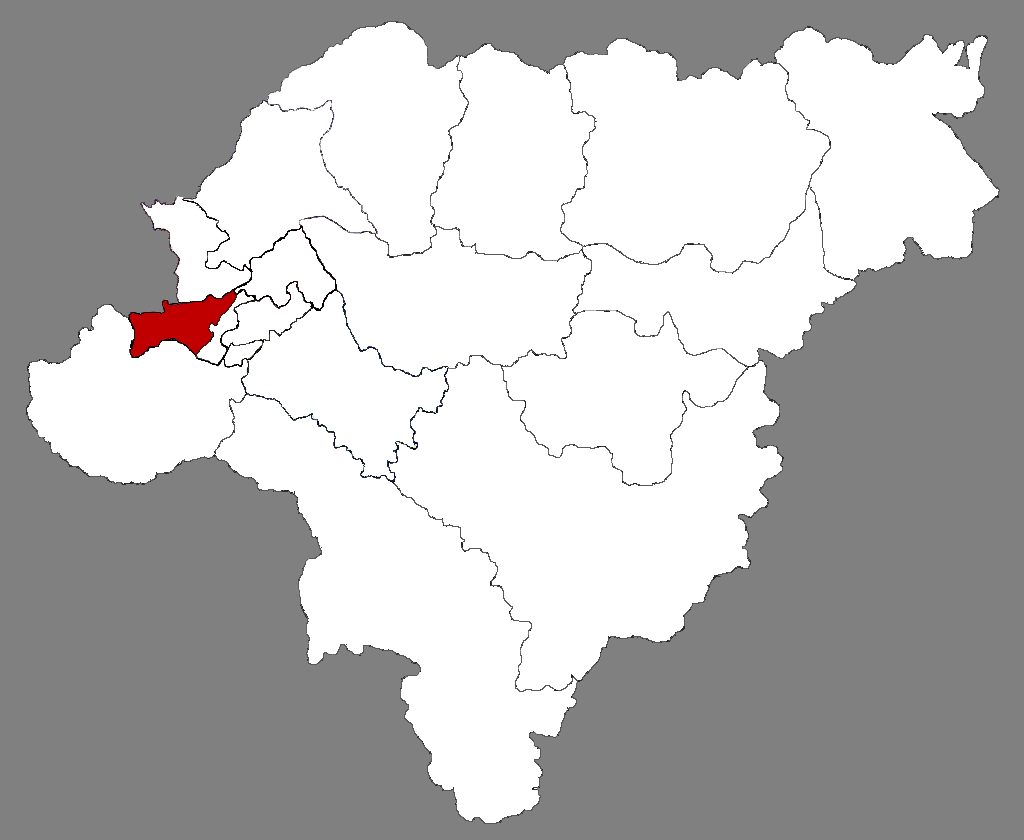
- Location of Daoli in Harbin

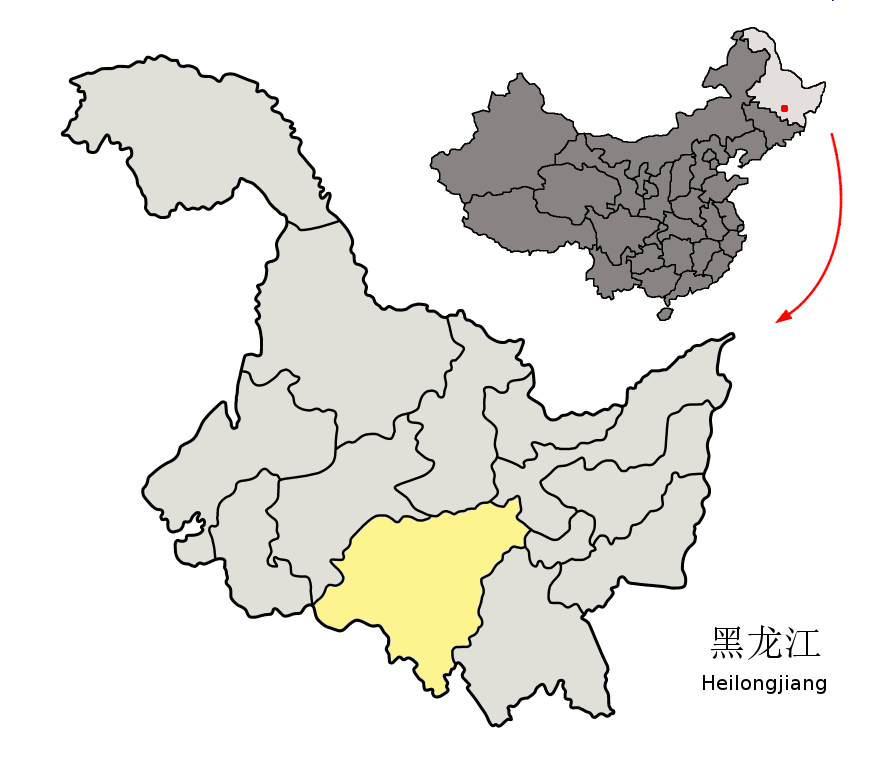
- Harbin in Heilongjiang
- Coordinates: 45°45′20″N 126°37′00″E
- Country: China
- Province: Heilongjiang
- Sub-provincial city: Harbin
- District seat: Fushun Subdistrict

Area
  - Total: 479.2 km^{2} (185.0 sq mi)
- Elevation: 130 m (430 ft)

Population (2020 census)
  - Total: 1,097,430
  - Density: 2,290/km^{2} (5,931/sq mi)
- Time zone: UTC+8 (China Standard)
- Area code: 0451
- Website: www.hrbdl.gov.cn

Daoli District (simplified Chinese: 道里区; traditional Chinese: 道裏區; pinyin: Dàolǐ Qū) is one of nine districts of the prefecture-level city of Harbin, the capital of Heilongjiang Province, Northeast China, forming part of the city's urban core. It is located on the Songhua River. It borders the districts of Songbei to the north, Daowai to the northeast, Nangang to the east, and Shuangcheng to the south, as well as the prefecture-level city of Suihua to the northwest.

Nowadays, Daoli District is also famous because of Central Street, which is one of the main business streets in Harbin.

== Administrative divisions ==
There are 19 subdistricts and four towns in the district:

19 subdistricts

- Zhaolin Subdistrict (兆麟街道)
- Xinyang Road Subdistrict (新阳路街道)
- Fushun Subdistrict (抚顺街道)
- Gongle Subdistrict (共乐街道)
- Xinhua Subdistrict (新华街道)
- Chengxiang Road Subdistrict (城乡路街道)
- Gongnong Subdistrict (工农街道)
- Shangzhi Subdistrict (尚志街道)
- Stalin Subdistrict (斯大林街道)
- Tongjiang Subdistrict (通江街道)
- Jingwei Subdistrict (经纬街道)
- Gongcheng Subdistrict (工程街道)
- Anjing Subdistrict (安静街道)
- Anhe Subdistrict (安和街道)
- Zhengyanghe Subdistrict (正阳河街道)
- Jianguo Subdistrict (建国街道)
- Kang'an Subdistrict (康安街道)
- Aijian Subdistrict (爱建街道)
- Qunli Subdistrict (群力街道)

4 towns

- Taiping Town (太平镇)
- Xinfa Town (新发镇)
- Xinnong Town (新农镇)
- Yushu Town (榆树镇)

== History ==
In 1898 (the 24th year of Guangxu), the Qing Dynasty government sent Li Hongzhang to Tsarist Russia, and signed the "Sino-Russian Secret Treaty", in which the secret agreement agreed on the construction of the Middle East Railway (now the Binzhou Railway). After the completion of the railway, The west of the railway was called "Daoli District" (lit. "inside the railway"), and the east of the railway was called "Daowai District" (lit. "outside the railway").

In 1907 (the 33rd year of Guangxu), the China Eastern Railway Administration promulgated the "Constitution of the Harbin Autonomous Council", which classified Xinshi Street (now Nan'gang District) and Butou District as urban areas and handed over to the "Harbin Autonomous Council" under the jurisdiction of the Russians. In 1912, the People's Republic of China was founded, and on March 30, 1926, the government of the Eastern Provincial Special Region issued a proclamation to dissolve the Russian "Harbin Autonomous Council" and established the "Harbin Autonomous Provisional Committee", which was under the jurisdiction of Daoli District.

After the 918 Incident, the Manchukuo government placed Daoli District under the jurisdiction of the newly established Harbin Special City and changed its name back to "Butou District". After the Second Sino-Japanese War, the government changed the port area back to Daoli District.

In December 1947, Xinyang District was divided into Daoli District, and in June 1948, it was divided into Daoli and Xinyang Districts. In November 1953, the Government of the People's Republic of China abolished Xinyang District and merged it into Daoli District.

In November 1958, the Harbin government abolished Binjiang District and merged it into Daoli District, and in January 1960, Zhaodong County was abolished and included in Daoli District. In August 1972, Binjiang District was abolished and merged into Daoli District.

In 1992, the Harbin Municipal Government designated Daoli District as one of the urban districts of Harbin City, located in the western part of the city.
