= Lianran Subdistrict =

- Subdistrict

Chinese transcription(s)
  - Simplified: 连然街道
  - Traditional: 連然街道
  - Pinyin: Liánrán Jiēdào
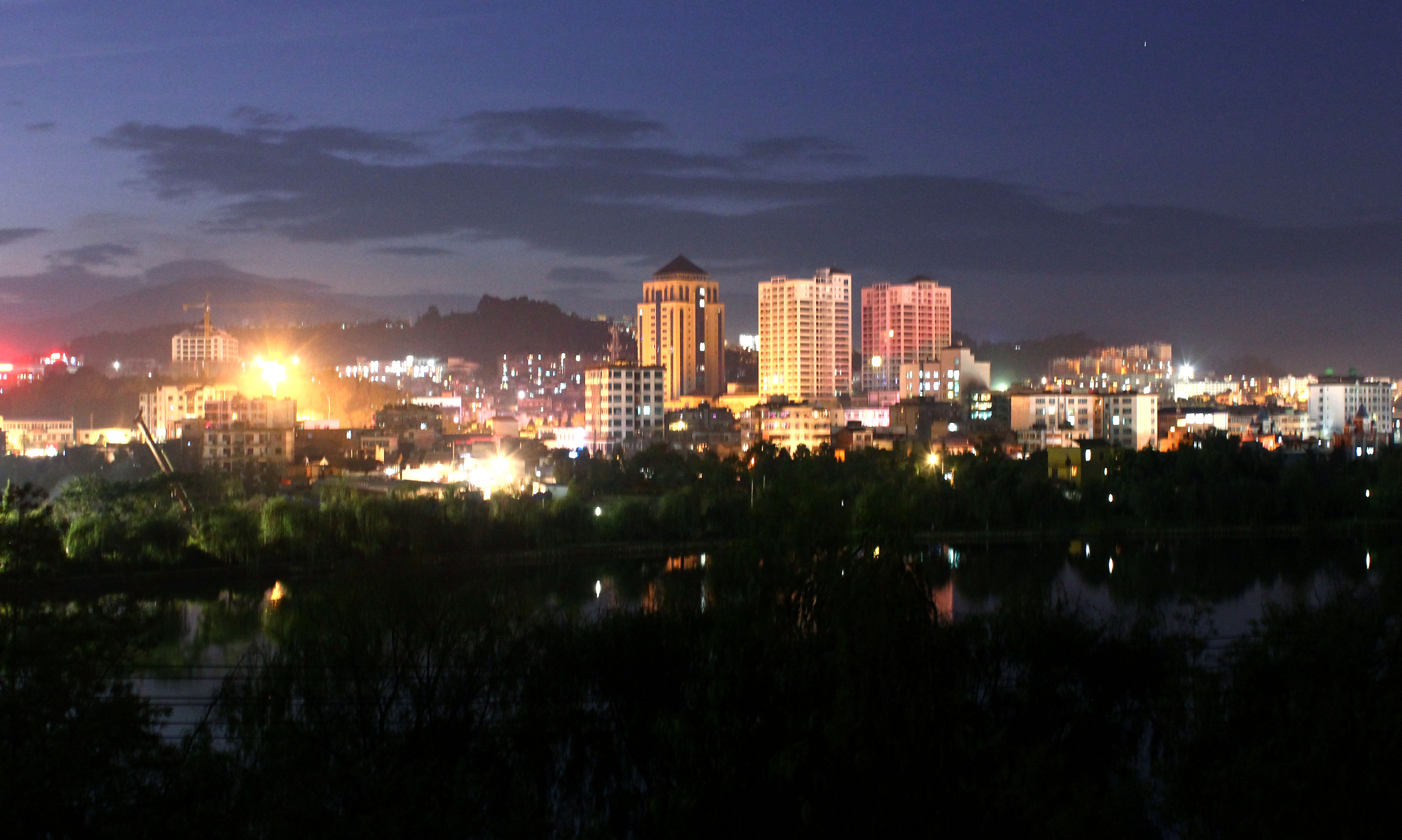

- Location within Yunnan
- Coordinates: 24°54′50″N 102°29′10″E
- Country: China
- Province: Yunnan
- Prefecture-level city: Kunming
- County-level city: Anning City

Area
  - Total: 69.84 km^{2} (26.97 sq mi)

Population
  - Total: 85,096
  - Density: 1,218/km^{2} (3,156/sq mi)
- Time zone: UTC+8 (China Standard)
- Postal code: 650300
- Area code: 0871

Lianran Subdistrict (Chinese: 连然街道; pinyin: Liánrán Jiēdào) is a subdistrict and the county seat of Anning City, Yunnan, China. It lies in west of Kunming, located on the bank of Tanglang River.
