= Lubiao Subdistrict =

Lianran Subdistrict
- Subdistrict

Chinese transcription(s)
  - Simplified: 禄脿街道
  - Traditional: 祿脿街道
  - Pinyin: Lùbiăo Jiēdào
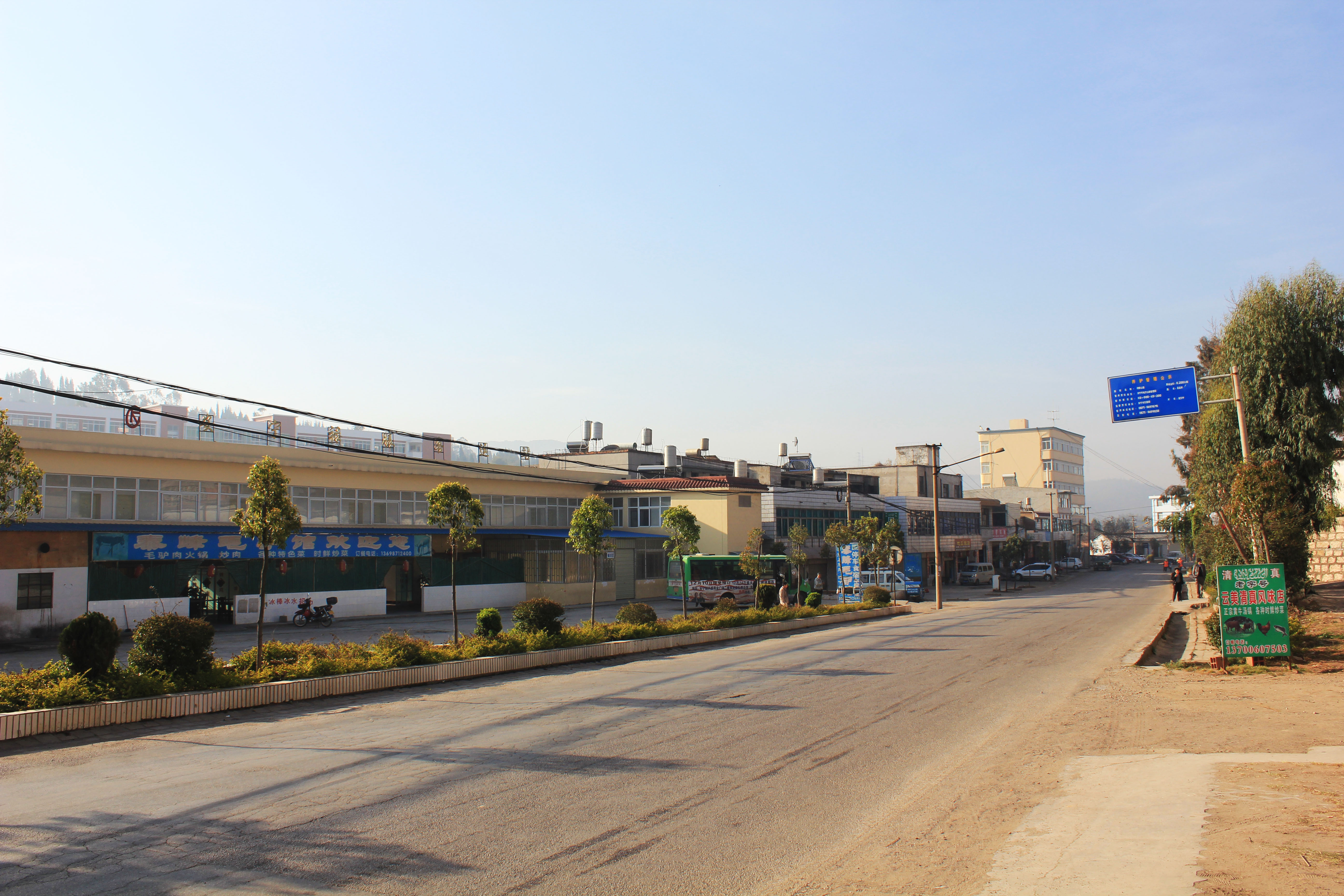

- Location within Yunnan
- Coordinates: 24°57′16″N 102°15′53″E
- Country: China
- Province: Yunnan
- Prefecture-level city: Kunming
- County-level city: Anning City

Area
  - Total: 113 km^{2} (44 sq mi)

Population
  - Total: 11,800
  - Density: 104/km^{2} (270/sq mi)
- Time zone: UTC+8 (China Standard)
- Postal code: 650311
- Area code: 0871

Lubiao Subdistrict (Chinese: 禄脿街道; pinyin: Lùbiăo Jiēdào) formerly a town situated in western Anning City, Yunnan province, southwestern China. Its status changed to a subdistrict of Anning in 2011. The name Lubiao means "a place with many white stones" in Yi language.
