= Jingwei Subdistrict, Harbin =

Jingwei Subdistrict 经纬街道
- Subdistrict
- Location in Heilongjiang Jingwei Subdistrict (China)
- Coordinates: 45°45′48″N 126°36′48″E
- Country: People's Republic of China
- Province: Heilongjiang
- Prefecture-level city: Harbin
- District: Daoli District
- Time zone: UTC+8 (China Standard)

Jingwei Subdistrict (simplified Chinese: 经纬街道; traditional Chinese: 經緯街道; pinyin: Jīngwěi Jiēdào) is a subdistrict in Daoli District, Harbin, Heilongjiang, China. As of 2023, it administers five residential communities: Da'an Community (大安社区), Jingweiqi Community (经纬七社区), Bei'an Community (北安社区), Dongduan Community (东段社区), and Jihongqiao Community (霁虹桥社区).

== See also ==
- List of township-level divisions of Heilongjiang
