= Gongnong Subdistrict, Harbin =

Gongnong Subdistrict 工农街道
- Subdistrict
- Location in Heilongjiang Gongnong Subdistrict (China)
- Coordinates: 45.7195°N 126.5585°E
- Country: People's Republic of China
- Province: Heilongjiang
- Prefecture-level city: Harbin
- District: Daoli District
- Time zone: UTC+8 (China Standard)

Gongnong Subdistrict (Chinese: 工农街道; pinyin: Gōngnóng Jiēdào) is a subdistrict in Daoli District, Harbin, Heilongjiang province, China. As of 2018, it has 14 residential communities under its administration.

== See also ==
- List of township-level divisions of Heilongjiang
