= Taiping Lake Bridge =

Taiping Lake Bridge 太平湖大桥
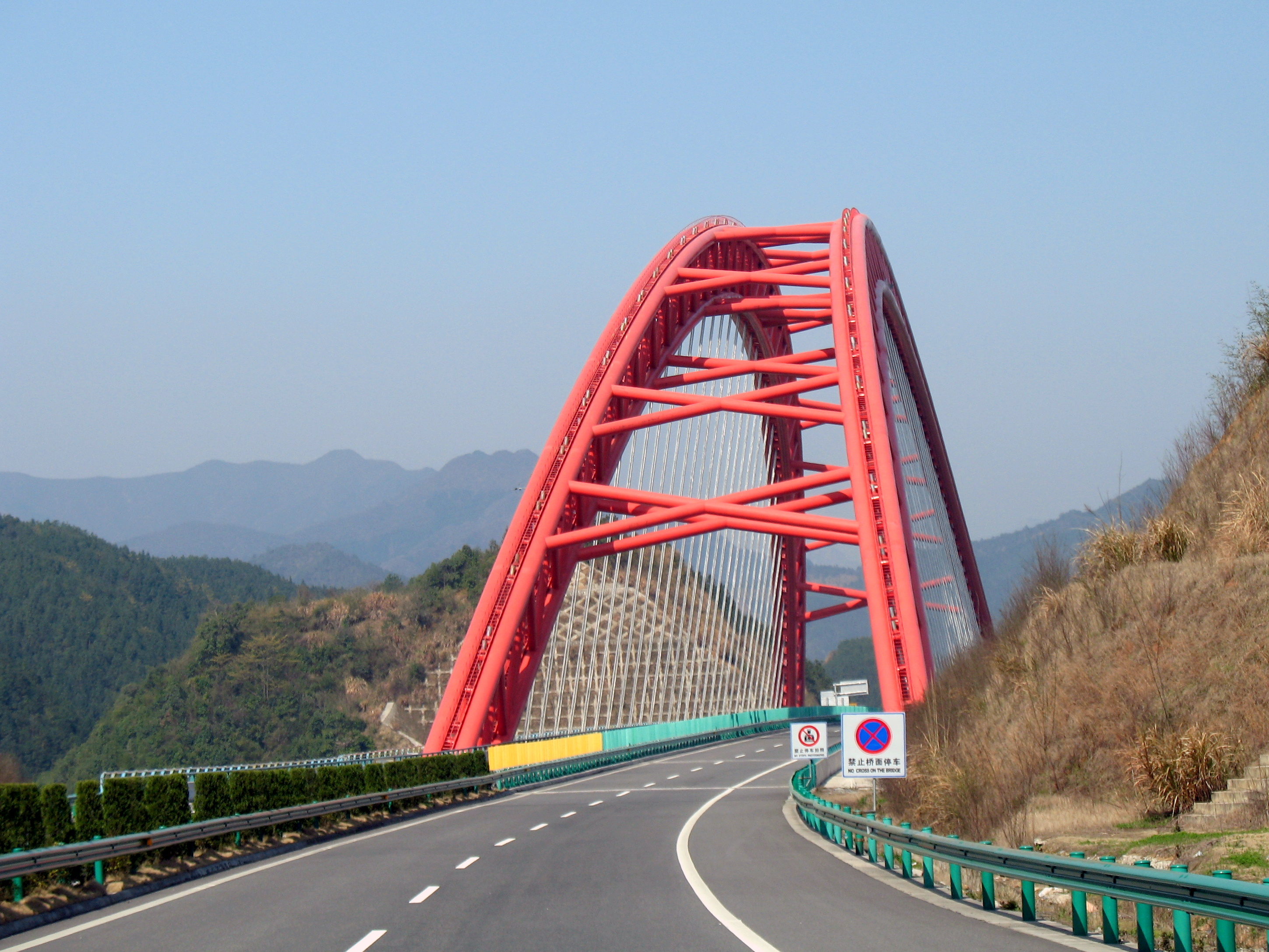
- Coordinates: 30°19′46.8″N 117°57′03.9″E
- Carries: 4 lanes of G3 Jingtai Expressway
- Crosses: Taiping Lake
- Locale: Huangshan City, Anhui, China
- Other name: Taipinghu Bridge

Characteristics
- Design: Arch Bridge
- Longest span: 336 metres (1,102 ft)

History
- Construction end: 2007

Location
- Interactive map of Taiping Lake Bridge

Taiping Lake Bridge is an arch bridge in the Huangshan District of Huangshan City, Anhui, China. The bridge spans 336 metres (1,102 ft) over the south western arm of Taiping Lake. The bridge carries four lanes of the G3 Beijing–Taipei Expressway.

== See also ==
- List of longest arch bridge spans
