= Bajie Subdistrict =

- Subdistrict

Chinese transcription(s)
  - Simplified: 八街街道
  - Traditional: 八街街道
  - Pinyin: Bājiē Jiēdào
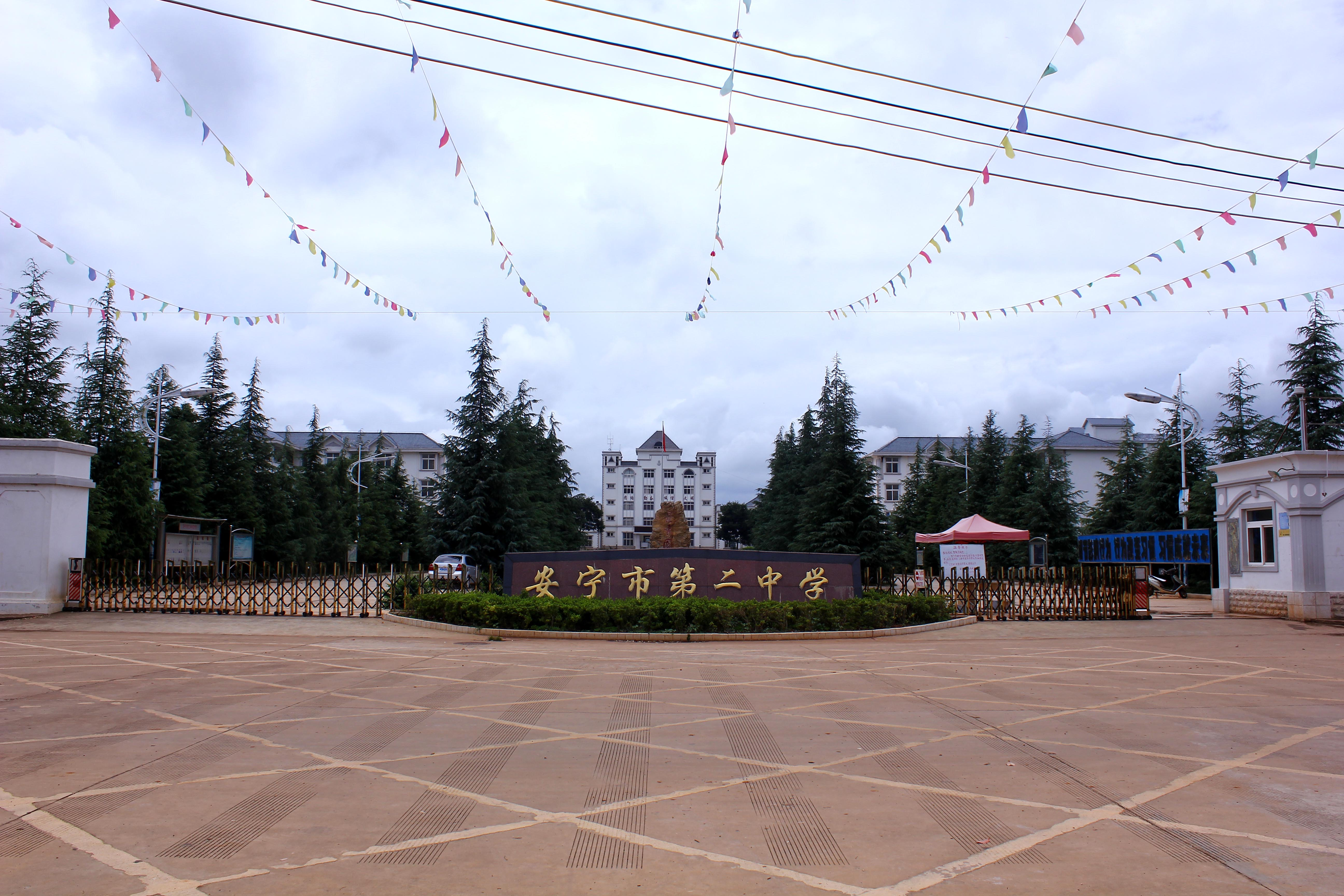

- Location within Yunnan
- Coordinates: 24°39′58″N 102°21′33″E
- Country: China
- Province: Yunnan
- Prefecture-level city: Kunming
- County-level city: Anning City

Area
  - Total: 344.18 km^{2} (132.89 sq mi)

Population (2010)
  - Total: 38,442
  - Density: 111.69/km^{2} (289.28/sq mi)
- Time zone: UTC+8 (China Standard)
- Postal code: 650305
- Area code: 0871

Bajie Subdistrict (Chinese: 八街街道; pinyin: Bājiē Jiēdào) is a subdistrict situated in southern Anning City, Yunnan province, southwestern China. It lies about 38 km west of Anning City, situated on the west bank of the Mingyi River. Formerly a town, its status changed to a subdistrict of Anning in 2011.
