= Caopu Subdistrict =

- Subdistrict

Chinese transcription(s)
  - Simplified: 草铺街道
  - Traditional: 草鋪街道
  - Pinyin: Cǎopù Jiēdào
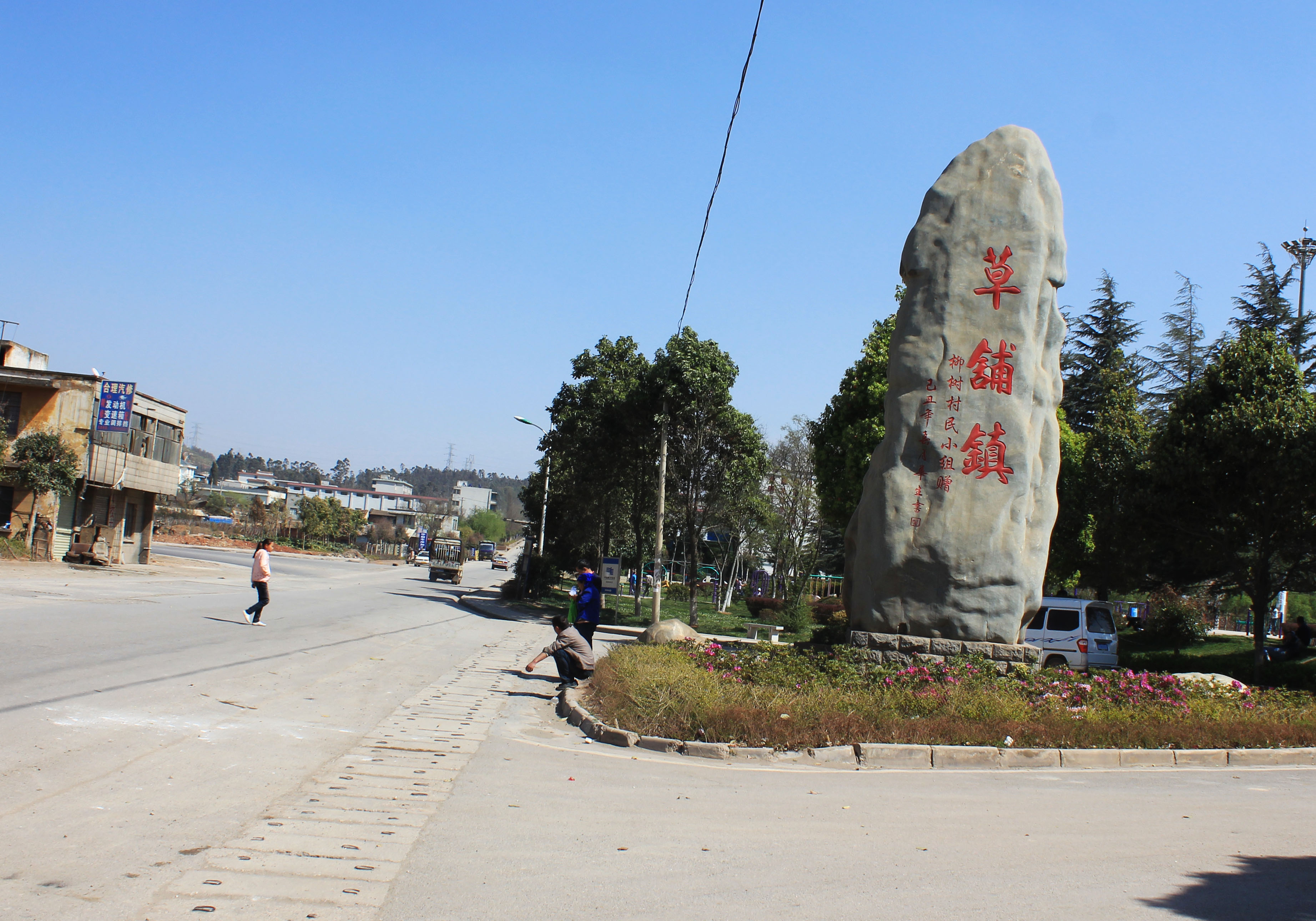

- Location within Yunnan
- Coordinates: 24°55′54″N 102°23′59″E
- Country: China
- Province: Yunnan
- Prefecture-level city: Kunming
- County-level city: Anning City

Area
  - Total: 171 km^{2} (66 sq mi)

Population
  - Total: 16,400
  - Density: 95.9/km^{2} (248/sq mi)
- Time zone: UTC+8 (China Standard)
- Postal code: 650309
- Area code: 0871

Caopu Subdistrict (Chinese: 草铺街道; pinyin: Cǎopù Jiēdào) is a subdistrict situated in western Anning City, Yunnan province, southwestern China. Formerly a town, its status changed to a subdistrict of Anning in 2011. The subdistrict has many industrial enterprises.
