= Zhangjiu River =

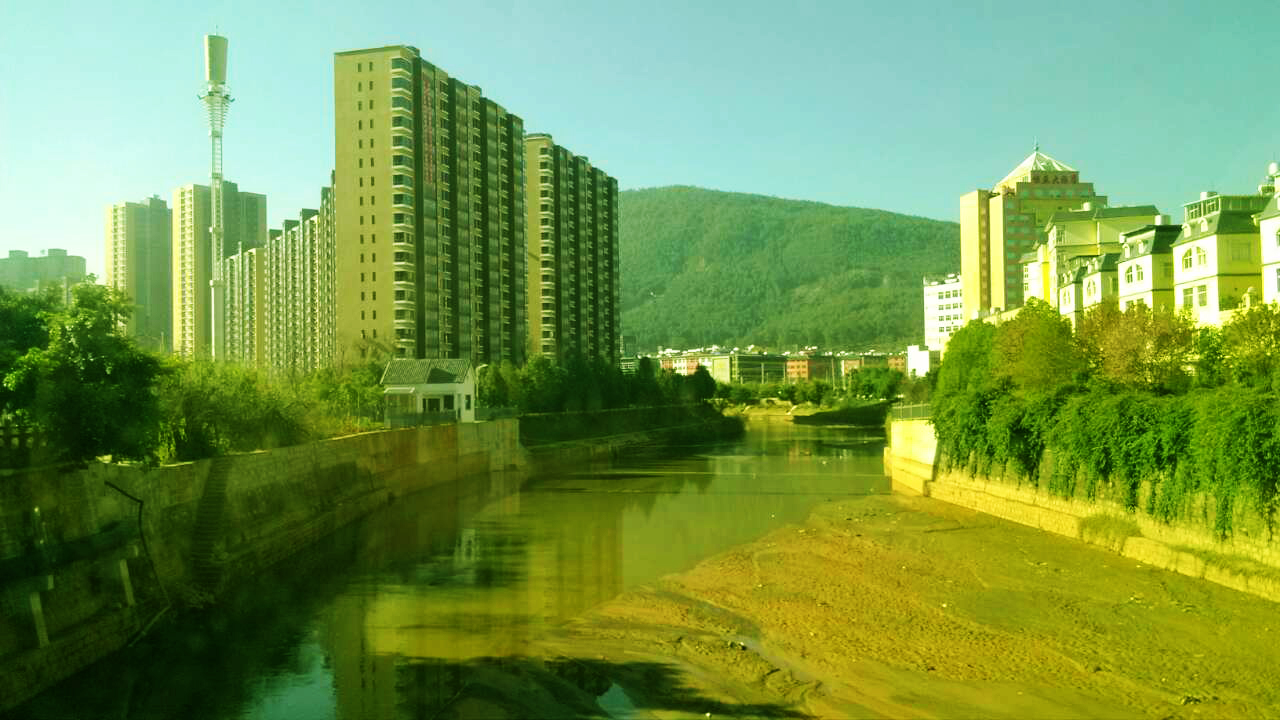
- Zhangjiu river in Luquan County

- Location of mouth in Yunnan Province

Location
- Country: China
- Province: Yunnan Province

Physical characteristics
- Mouth
  - coordinates: 25°29′51″N 102°34′38″E

The Zhangjiu River (Chinese: 掌鸠河; pinyin: Zhǎngjiū Hé) is a 120-km-long tributary of the Pudu River in Luquan Yi and Miao Autonomous County in the China province of Yunnan. It flows south across western Luquan County and joins Pudu River at Chahe village.
