= Taiping Lake =

Taiping Lake or Taipinghu may refer to:

- Taiping Lake (Anhui), a lake in Anhui, China
- Taiping Lake Gardens, public garden in Taiping, Perak, Malaysia
- Taiping Lake (Shanghai), a lake in Taipingqiao Park, Shanghai, China
