= Tai Ping Shan =

Tai Ping Shan, Taipingshan, Taiping Mountain, or Mount Taiping may refer to:

- Victoria Peak, a mountain in the western half of Hong Kong Island
- Tai Ping Shan Street, a street marking the early colonial history in Hong Kong
- Taiping Mountain, in Ilan on Taiwan

== See also ==
- Taiping (disambiguation)
