= Shangzhi Township =

Shangzhi Township 尚志乡
- Township
- Location in Liaoning
- Coordinates: 41°6′5″N 120°20′39″E
- Country: People's Republic of China
- Province: Liaoning
- Prefecture-level city: Chaoyang
- County: Chaoyang County
- Time zone: UTC+8 (China Standard)

Shangzhi Township (simplified Chinese: 尚志乡; traditional Chinese: 尚志鄉; pinyin: Shàngzhì Xiāng) is a township in Chaoyang County, Liaoning, China. As of 2020, it has seven villages under its administration:

- Shangzhi Village
- Fanjiagou Village (范家沟村)
- Dachehu Village (大车户村)
- Mijiagou Village (米家沟村)
- Zhengzhangzi Village (郑杖子村)
- Erchehu Village (二车户村)
- Fengzhangzi Village (冯杖子村)
