= Shangzhi Subdistrict =

Shangzhi Subdistrict 尚志街道
- Subdistrict
- Location in Heilongjiang Shangzhi Subdistrict (China)
- Coordinates: 45.76819°N 126.62144°E
- Country: China
- Province: Heilongjiang
- Prefecture-level city: Harbin
- District: Daoli District
- Time zone: UTC+8 (China Standard Time)

Shangzhi Subdistrict (Chinese: 尚志街道; pinyin: Shàngzhì Jiēdào) is a subdistrict under the jurisdiction of Daoli District, Harbin City, Heilongjiang Province, People's Republic of China. As of 2020, it administers the following three residential neighborhoods:

- Xishiwudao Street Community (西十五道街社区)
- Zhongyang Avenue Community (中央大街社区)
- Xiejiao Street Community (斜角街社区)

== See also ==
- List of township-level divisions of Heilongjiang
