= Taiping New City Subdistrict =

- Subdistrict

Chinese transcription(s)
  - Simplified: 太平新城街道
  - Traditional: 太平新城街道
  - Pinyin: Tàipíng Xīnchéng Jiēdào
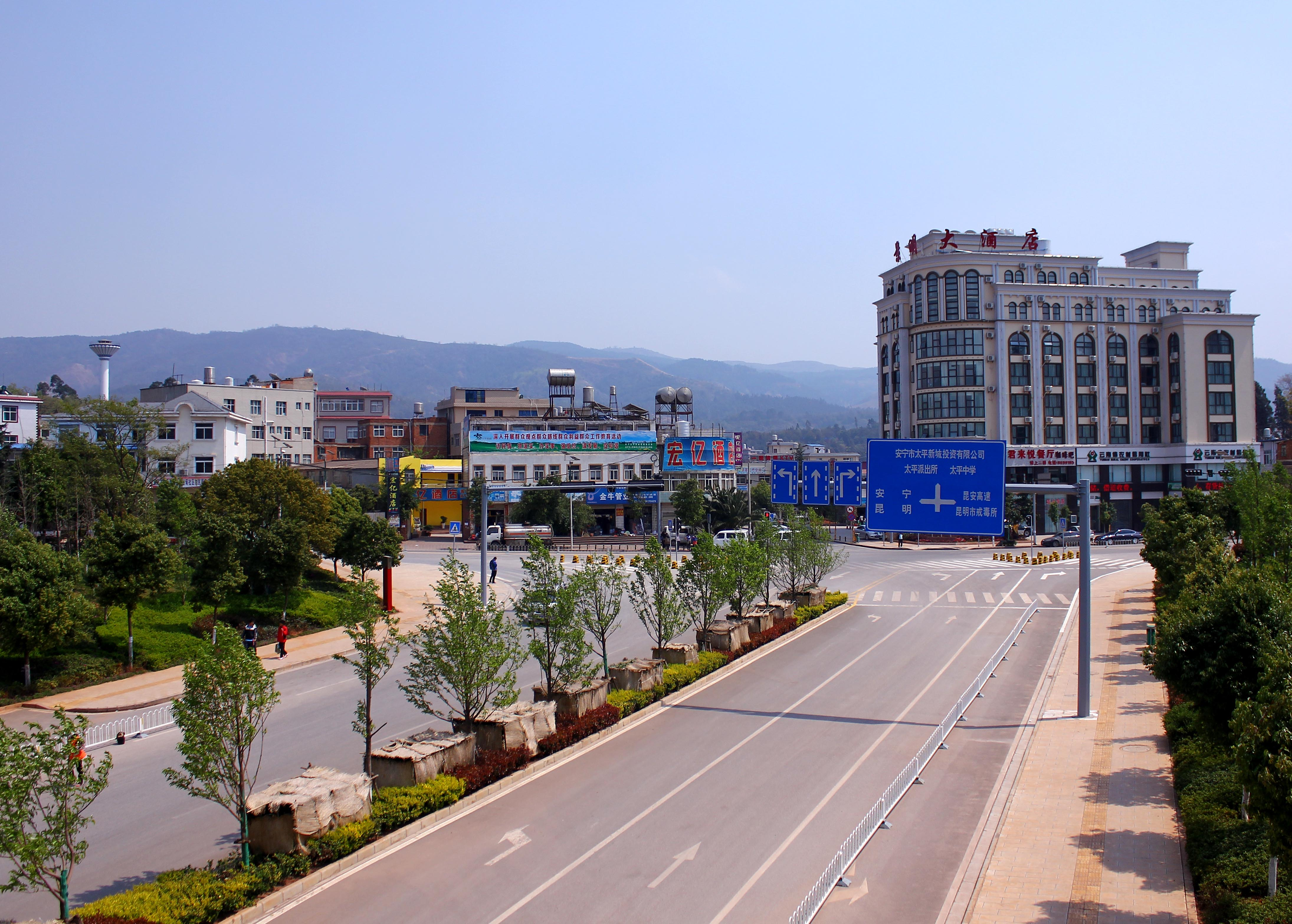

- Location within Yunnan
- Coordinates: 24°57′01″N 102°35′05″E
- Country: China
- Province: Yunnan
- Prefecture-level city: Kunming
- County-level city: Anning City

Area
  - Total: 85 km^{2} (33 sq mi)

Population (2010)
  - Total: 17,200
  - Density: 200/km^{2} (520/sq mi)
- Time zone: UTC+8 (China Standard)
- Postal code: 650301
- Area code: 0871
- Website: http://www.tpost.org/

Taiping New City Subdistrict (Chinese: 太平新城街道; pinyin: Tàipíng Xīnchéng Jiēdào) is a subdistrict situated in eastern Anning City, Yunnan province, southwestern China. It lies about 12 km east of Anning City, situated at the western foot of the West Hill. Formerly a town (太平镇), its status changed to a subdistrict of Anning in 2011.
