= Taiping, Harbin =

Taiping 太平镇
- Town
- Location in Heilongjiang Taiping (China)
- Coordinates: 45°37′51″N 126°11′15″E
- Country: People's Republic of China
- Province: Heilongjiang
- Prefecture-level city: Harbin
- District: Daoli District
- Time zone: UTC+8 (China Standard)

Taiping (Chinese: 太平; pinyin: Tàipíng) is a town in Daoli District, Harbin, Heilongjiang province, China. Harbin Taiping International Airport is located in and named after Taiping.

As of 2020, it administers Taiping Residential Community and the following nine villages:

- Taiping Village (太平村)
- Yonghe Village (永和村)
- Xianfa Village (先发村)
- Tai'an Village (太安村)
- Ligong Village (立功村)
- Liquan Village (立权村)
- Qianjin Village (前进村)
- Xianfu Village (先富村)
- Liye Village (立业村)
