= Central Street (Harbin) =

Street in Harbin, China

Central Street, Zhongyang street
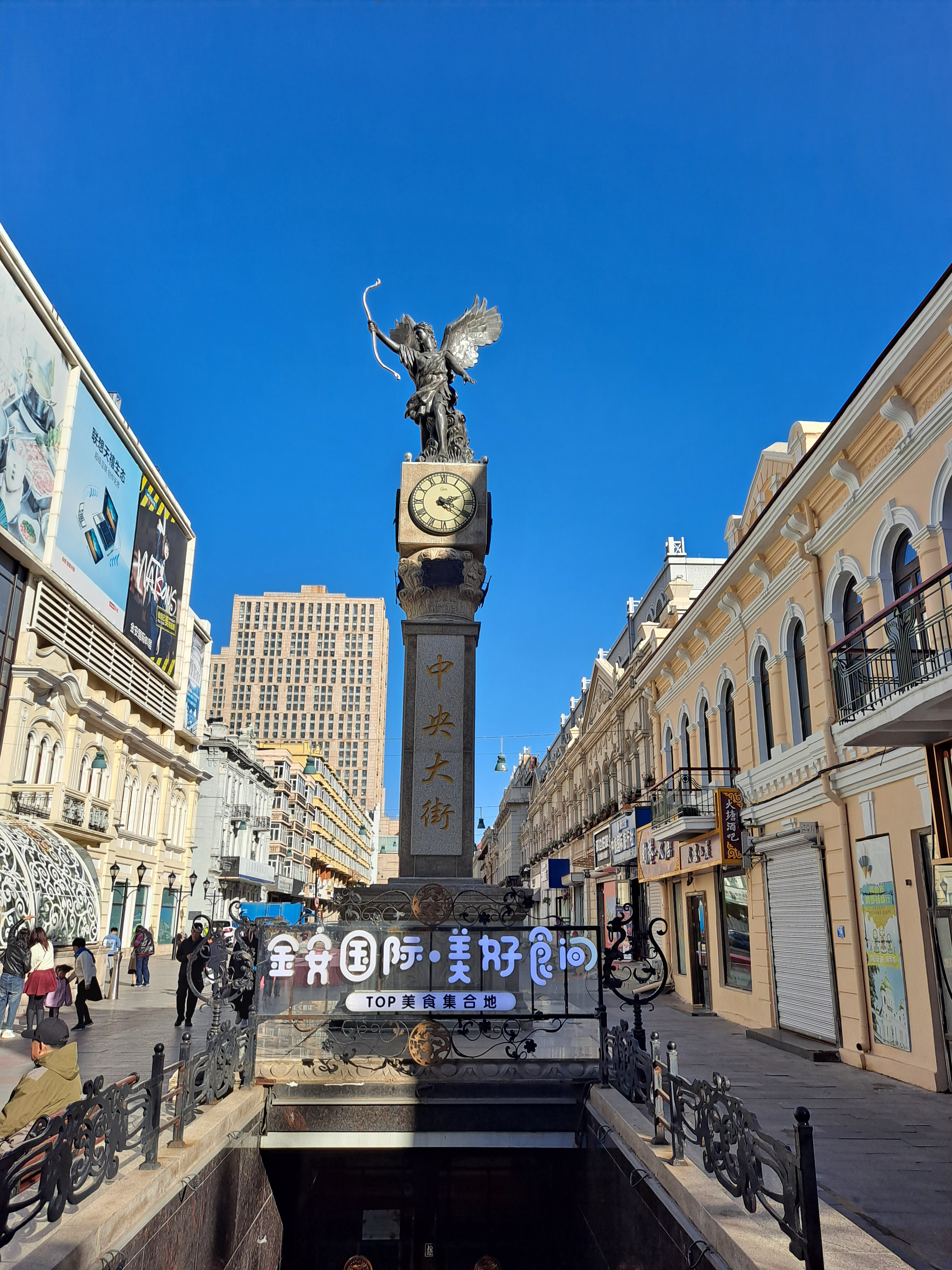
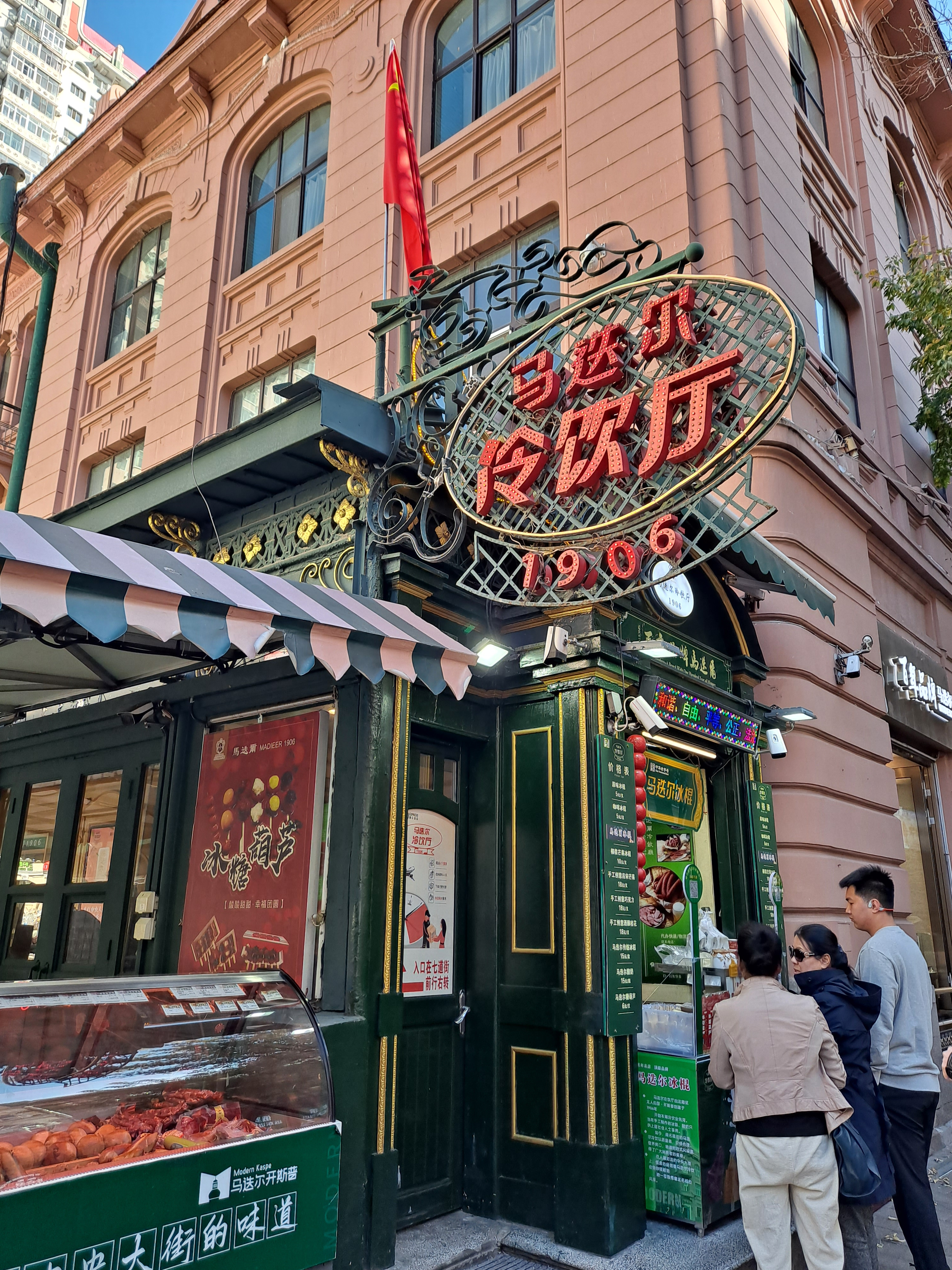
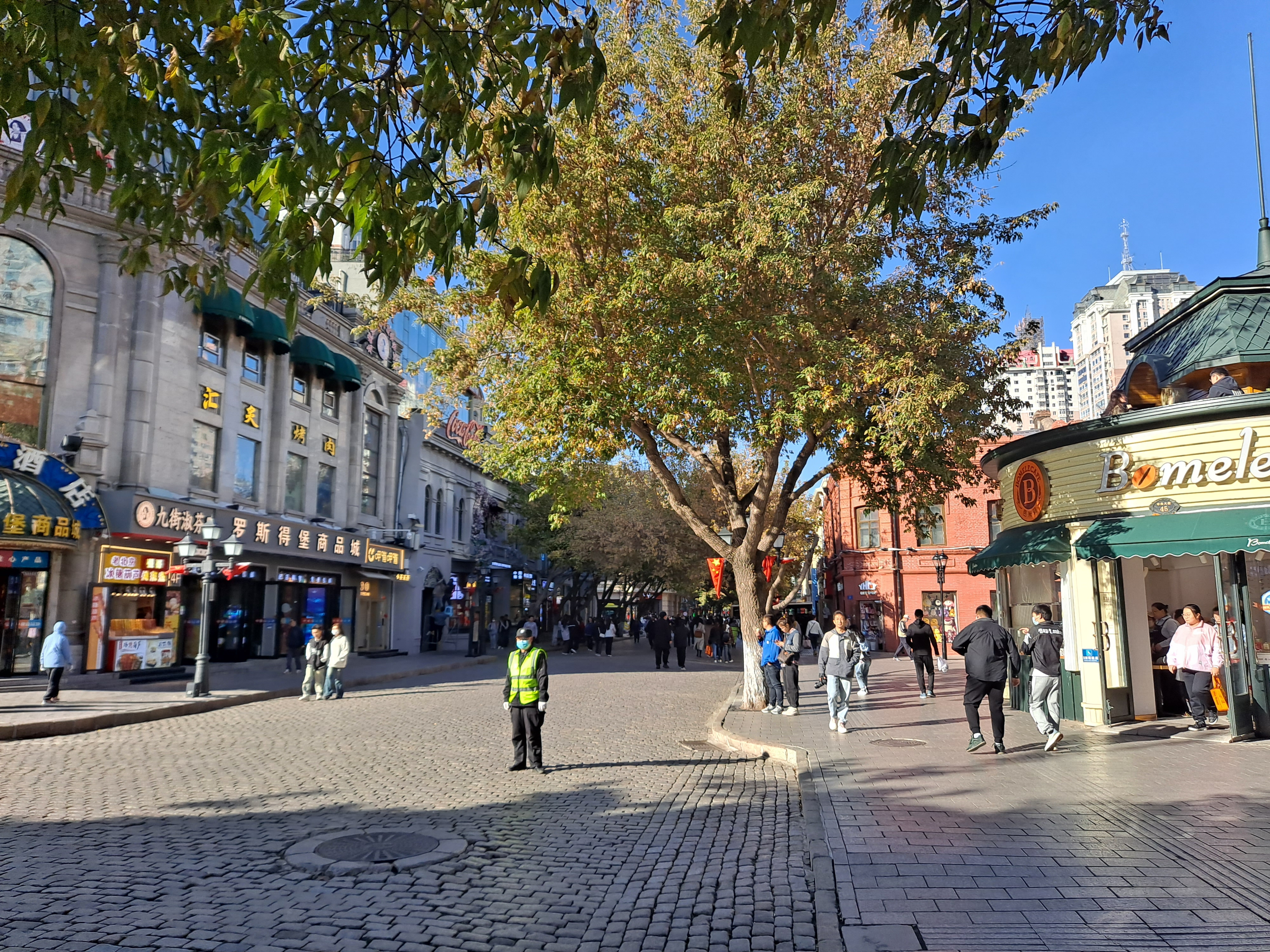
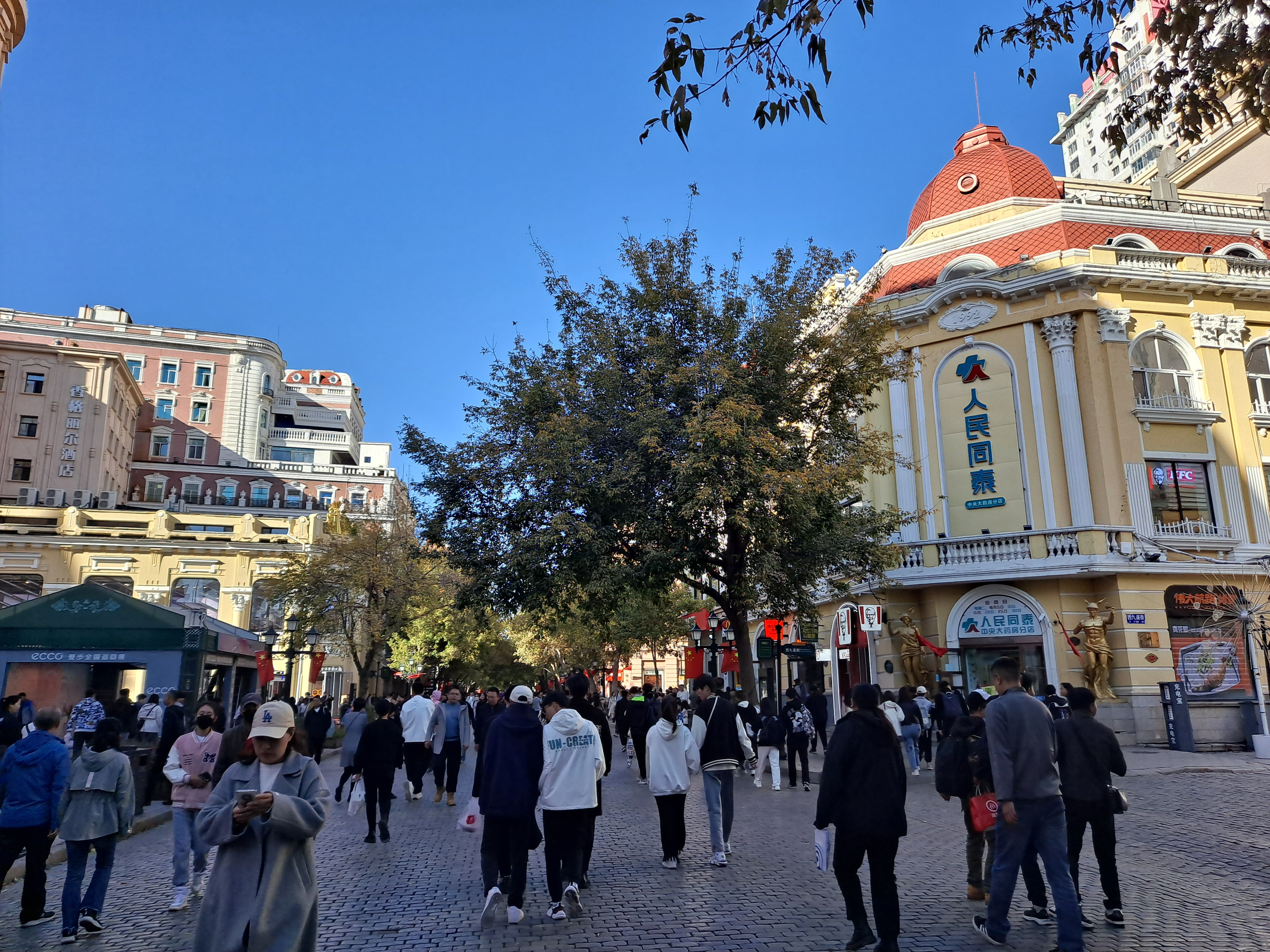
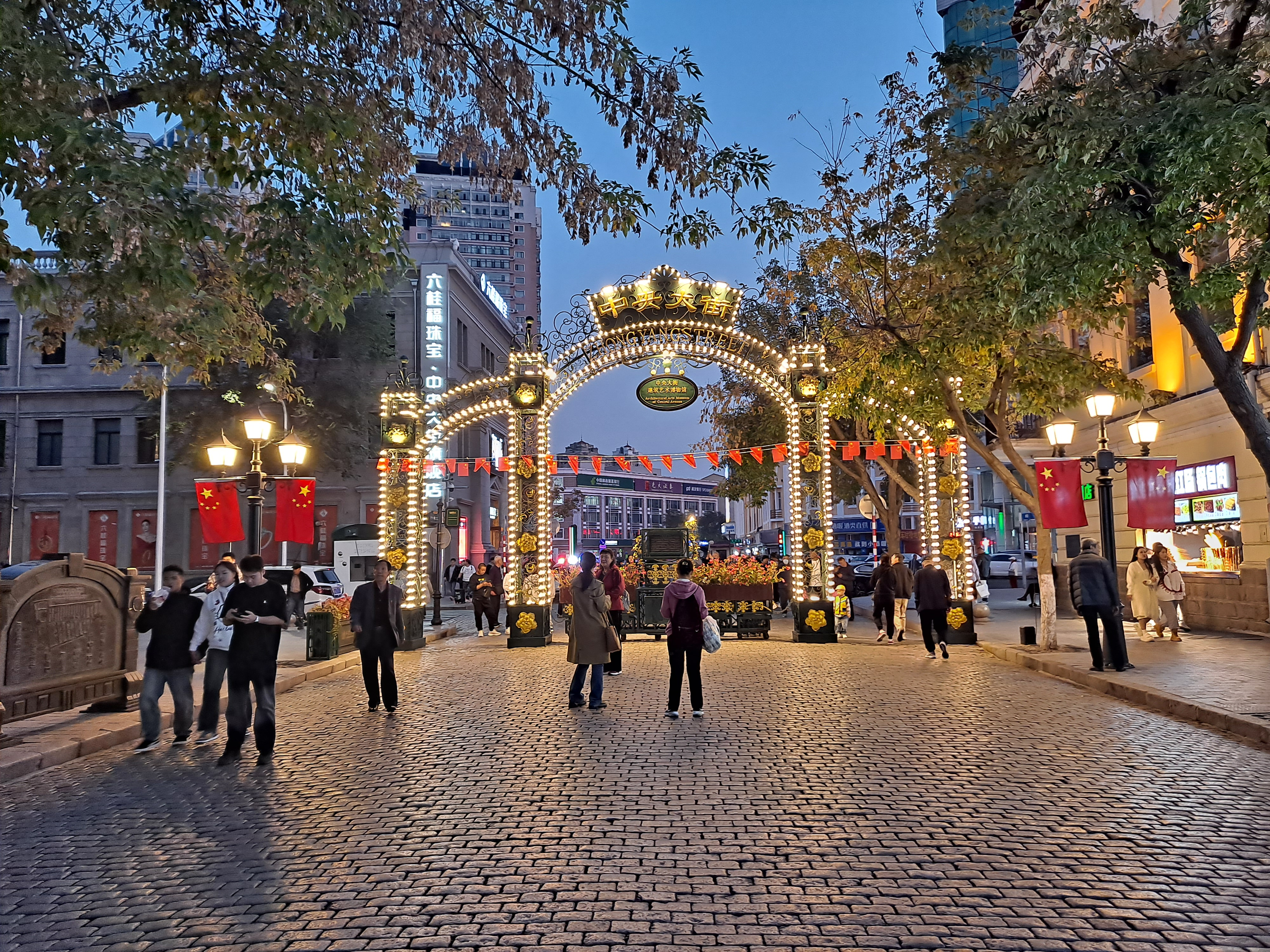
- Interactive map of Central Street, Zhongyang street
- Native name: 中央大街 (Chinese)
- Former names: Chinese Street (Chinese: 中國大街) (Russian: Китайская Улица)
- Length: 1450m
- Width: 21m
- Location: Harbin, Heilongjiang, China

Construction
- Construction start: 1898
- Completion: 1920

Central Street or Zhongyang Street (Chinese: 中央大街) is a pedestrian street located in central Harbin, China. Measuring 1450 meters long, it is currently the longest pedestrian street in Asia and the only cobbled street in Harbin. It was built in 1898 by Russian constructors when the city was at its semi-colonial period. Architectures along the street are in various styles including eclectic, Baroque, Renaissance and modern.

== History ==
The street was built in 1898 when China Eastern Railway, a railway crossing Manchuria, was under construction, making Harbin a major railway hub and prospering the city. In 1925, cobblestone was paved on the street with great costs in order to prevent erosion from the nearby Songhua River. By 1920s, the street has become an international street with more than one hundred shops. Its main inhabitants then were Russians, Jews, Chinese, Japanese and various other ethnic groups. In 1986, Central Street was listed preserved by Harbin municipal government.
