= Anning, Yunnan =

Anning 安宁市
- County-level City
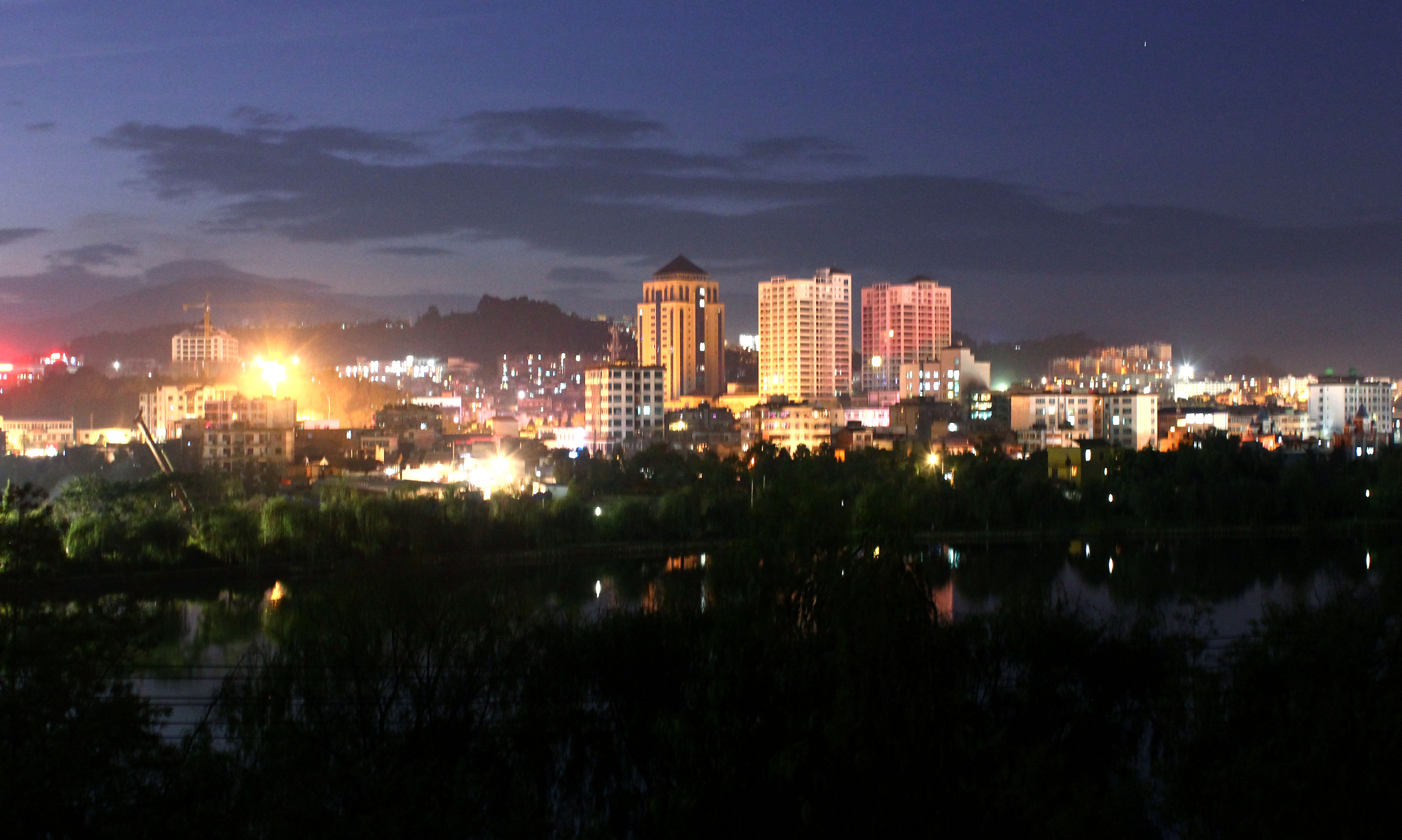

- Location of Anning City (red) in Kunming City (pink) and Yunnan province

- Location in Yunnan
- Coordinates: 24°55′08″N 102°28′41″E
- Country: People's Republic of China
- Province: Yunnan
- Prefecture-level city: Kunming

Area
  - Total: 1,301 km^{2} (502 sq mi)

Population (2020)
  - Total: 483,753
  - Density: 371.8/km^{2} (963.0/sq mi)
- Time zone: UTC+8 (CST)
- Postal code: 650300
- Area code: 0871
- Website: www.ynan.gov.cn

Anning (simplified Chinese: 安宁市; traditional Chinese: 安寧市; pinyin: Ānníng) is a county-level city under the jurisdiction of Kunming, the capital of Yunnan province, China. It is located approximately 28 kilometers southwest of Kunming city proper. In 1995, Anning was upgraded to a county-level city from a county.

Anning borders Xishan District to the east and northeast, Lufeng, Yunnan to the west and northwest, Jinning District to the south and southeast, and Yimen County to the southwest. It is located in western Kunming.

== Administrative divisions ==
Lianran Subdistrict, Jinfang Subdistrict, Taiping New City Subdistrict, Bajie Subdistrict, Xianjie Subdistrict, Wenquan Subdistrict, Qionglong Subdistrict, Caopu Subdistrict and Lubiao Subdistrict.

== Economy ==
Anning is the largest metallurgical, salt, and phosphorus chemical base in Yunnan Province, home to the largest steel company in Kunming, Yunnan, and the main production base of Yuntianhua Group, the largest chemical company in Yunnan. With PetroChina Yunnan Petrochemical's 10 million ton oil refining project settled in Caopu area of Anning Industrial Park, Anning will become the center of Yunnan Petrochemical Industry. However, due to concerns that the project contains PX projects, in 2013 Kunming City broke out against PX projects.

== Tourism ==
The Anning Hot Spring is a popular holiday resort and tourist destination in Kunming. It lies at 1,795 meters above sea level and is at the foot of the Yuquan Mountain, also known as the Jade Spring Hill, in an area with trees and a natural park. Aside from the Yuquanshan, it is also near Congshan Hill in the west and Bijiashan Hill in the northeast.

== History ==
In the reign of Emperor Wu of the Han dynasty, it was sealed in Lianran County for two years (109 BC). Then, in the reign of Emperor Gaozu of Tang, it was renamed Anning County for four years (621 AD). In the Yuan dynasty (1275 AD), the county was promoted to a state. In the 2nd year of the Republic of China (1913 AD), the county was restored. On April 20, 1950, Anning County People's Government was established. In October 1956, Anning County was changed to Anning District of Kunming City. In September 1959, it was renamed Anning County. On October 13, 1995, the county was withdrawn from the city and established under the jurisdiction of Kunming City.

== Climate ==
Climate data for Anning, elevation 1,893 m (6,211 ft), (1991–2020 normals, extremes 1991–present)
Month	Jan	Feb	Mar	Apr	May	Jun	Jul	Aug	Sep	Oct	Nov	Dec	Year
Record high °C (°F)	24.3 (75.7)	27.3 (81.1)	29.2 (84.6)	32.2 (90.0)	33.5 (92.3)	33.9 (93.0)	31.0 (87.8)	31.7 (89.1)	30.6 (87.1)	28.6 (83.5)	27.2 (81.0)	25.6 (78.1)	33.9 (93.0)
Mean daily maximum °C (°F)	16.8 (62.2)	19.2 (66.6)	22.6 (72.7)	25.3 (77.5)	26.3 (79.3)	26.3 (79.3)	25.5 (77.9)	25.6 (78.1)	24.0 (75.2)	21.8 (71.2)	19.3 (66.7)	16.6 (61.9)	22.4 (72.4)
Daily mean °C (°F)	8.7 (47.7)	11.1 (52.0)	14.6 (58.3)	17.7 (63.9)	19.8 (67.6)	21.0 (69.8)	20.5 (68.9)	20.2 (68.4)	18.6 (65.5)	16.0 (60.8)	12.0 (53.6)	8.9 (48.0)	15.8 (60.4)
Mean daily minimum °C (°F)	2.4 (36.3)	4.3 (39.7)	7.8 (46.0)	11.1 (52.0)	14.4 (57.9)	17.1 (62.8)	17.3 (63.1)	16.7 (62.1)	15.2 (59.4)	12.3 (54.1)	7.0 (44.6)	3.3 (37.9)	10.7 (51.3)
Record low °C (°F)	−4.5 (23.9)	−1.8 (28.8)	−0.6 (30.9)	3.2 (37.8)	5.0 (41.0)	9.0 (48.2)	12.7 (54.9)	10.0 (50.0)	5.8 (42.4)	4.5 (40.1)	−3.4 (25.9)	−5.4 (22.3)	−5.4 (22.3)
Average precipitation mm (inches)	22.5 (0.89)	11.4 (0.45)	17.3 (0.68)	26.8 (1.06)	68.9 (2.71)	159.6 (6.28)	196.0 (7.72)	170.6 (6.72)	104.0 (4.09)	68.1 (2.68)	27.7 (1.09)	11.5 (0.45)	884.4 (34.82)
Average precipitation days (≥ 0.1 mm)	4.3	3.3	5.0	7.3	11.0	17.0	20.0	19.6	14.6	11.6	5.6	3.9	123.2
Average snowy days	0.8	0.3	0.2	0	0	0	0	0	0	0	0.1	0.3	1.7
Average relative humidity (%)	67	58	53	54	62	73	80	80	79	79	75	73	69
Mean monthly sunshine hours	214.6	221.6	248.5	248.3	207.7	139.2	113.5	127.8	113.6	131.8	176.9	183.0	2,126.5
Percentage possible sunshine	64	69	66	65	50	34	27	32	31	37	54	56	49
Source: China Meteorological Administrationall-time November record high
