= Taiping Lake (Anhui) =

Lake in Anhui, China

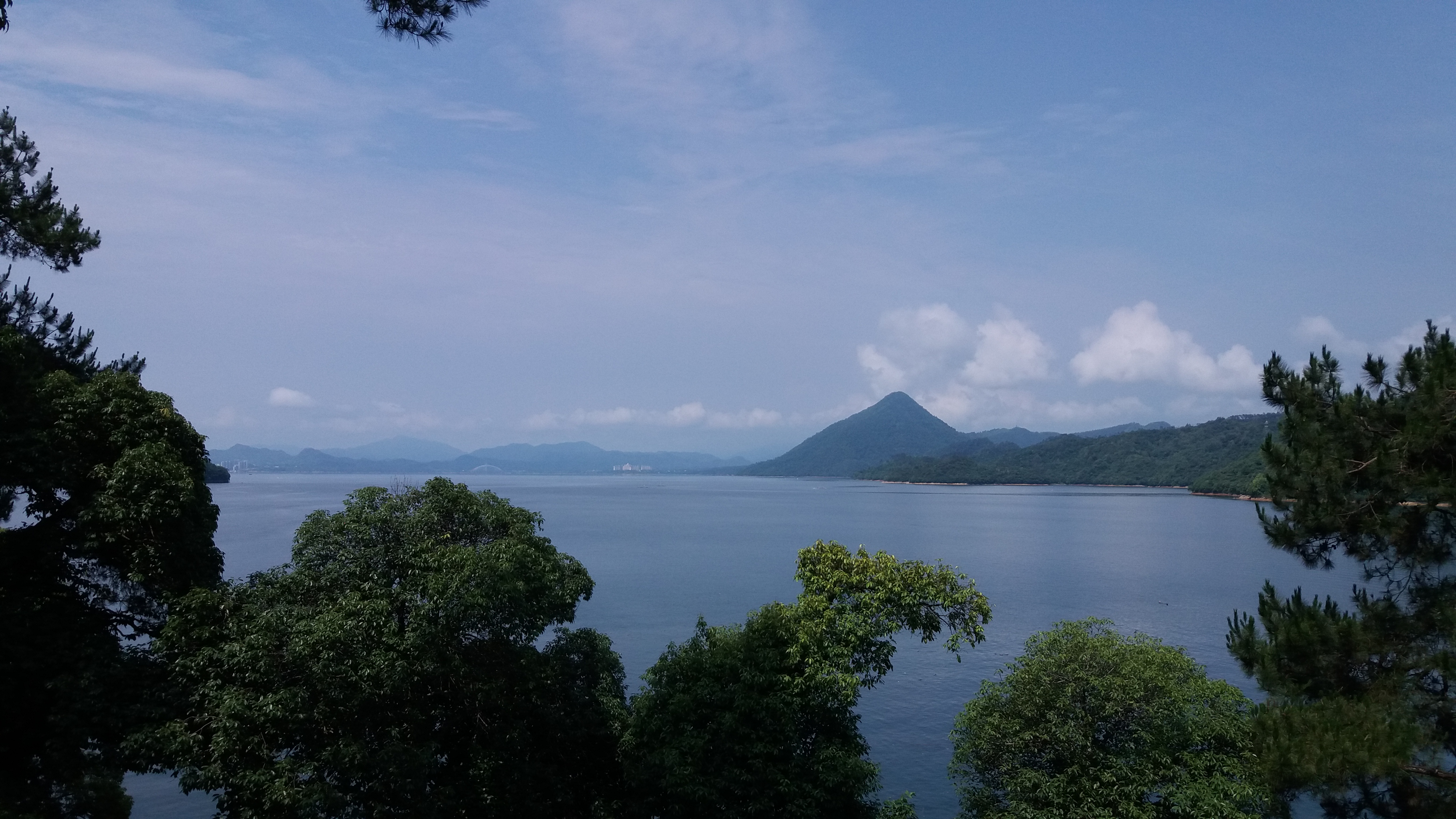

- Location within China
- Location: Anhui, China
- Coordinates: 30.36°N 118.00°E
- Basin countries: China
- Max. length: 60 km (37 mi)
- Surface area: 88.6 km^{2} (34.2 sq mi)
- Water volume: 2.4 billion cubic metres (1.9×10^{6} acre⋅ft)

Taiping Lake (Chinese: 太平湖; pinyin: Tàipíng Hú) is a lake in Anhui, China. It is crossed by the Taiping Lake Bridge.
