= Pudu River =

Pudu River Tanglang River
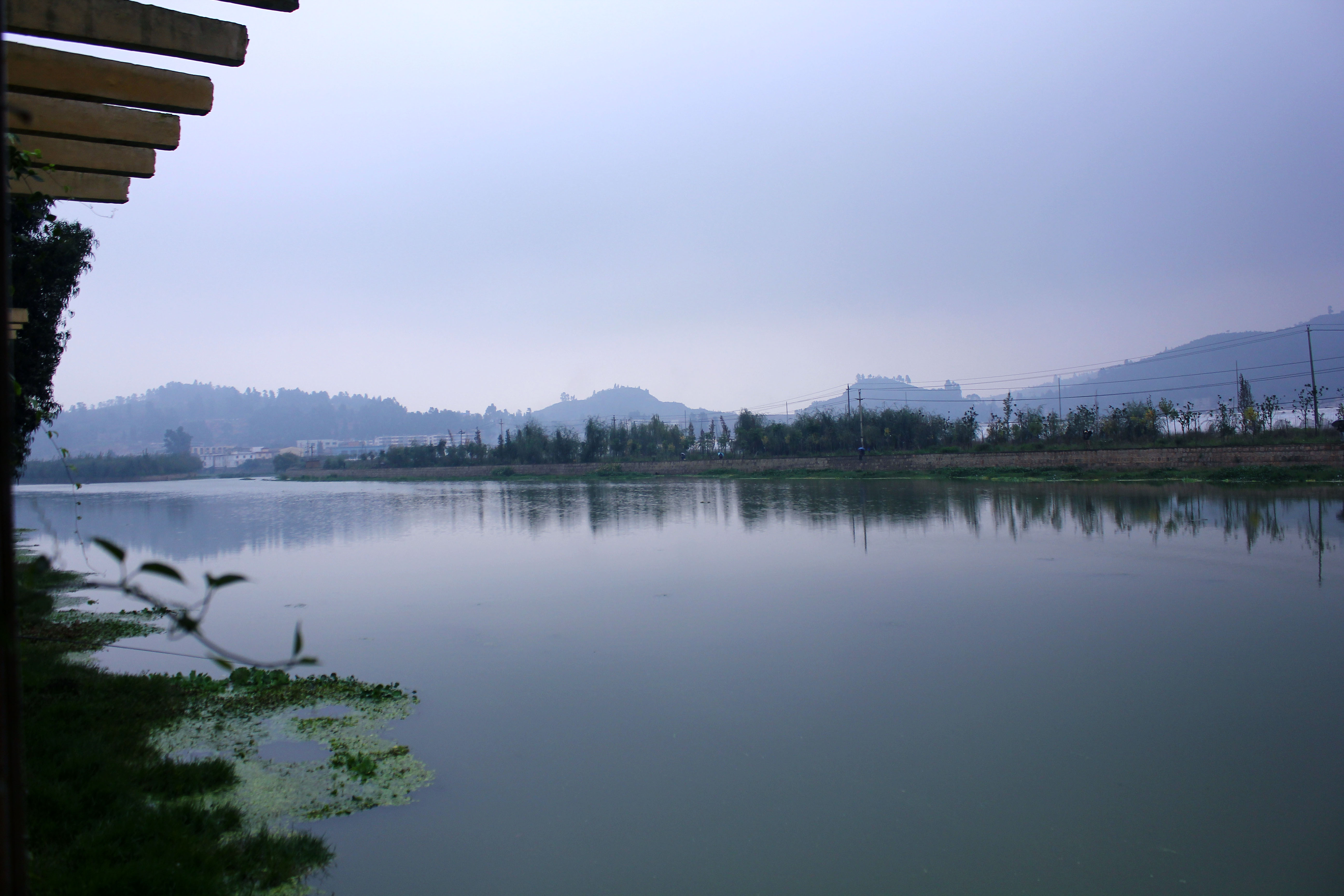
- Tanglang River near Haikou, Kunming
- Native name: 普渡河 (Chinese)

Location
- Country: China
- State: Yunnan
- Cities: Kunming City, Anning City, Fumin County

Physical characteristics
- Source: Dian Lake
  - location: Haikou Subdistrict, Xishan District, Kunming
  - coordinates: 24°46′31″N 102°36′42″E
- Mouth: Jinsha River
  - location: Zehei Township, Luquan Yi and Miao Autonomous County
  - coordinates: 26°18′09″N 102°48′12″E
- Length: 363.6 km (225.9 mi)(approx.)
- Basin size: 11,657 km^{2} (4,501 sq mi)(approx.)
- Discharge
  - average: 91.2 m^{3}/s (3,220 cu ft/s)

Basin features
- River system: Yangtze River
- Tributaries
  - left: Mingyi River, Zhangjiu River
  - right: Xima River
- Encyclopedia of rivers and lakes in China Section of Changjiang basin. Beijing: China WaterPower Press. 2010. ISBN 978-7-5084-6512-8.

The Pudu River (Chinese: 普渡河; pinyin: Pǔdù Hé), also known as the Tanglang River (Chinese: 螳螂江; pinyin: Tángláng Jiāng), is a major river in Yunnan Province in southwest China.

== Geography ==
The river leaves Dian Lake near Haikou Subdistrict (海口街道) in Xishan District, Kunming, in the southwestern part of the lake. The outlet of the lake is called the Tanglang River (Chinese: 螳螂江; pinyin: Tángláng Jiāng). The river runs northward through Anning City and Fumin County; from there on, it is called the Pudu River. It joins the Jinsha River, one of the main tributaries of the Yangtze, in the northeastern part of Luquan Yi and Miao Autonomous County. The river is about 363.6 kilometres long.

== Name ==
The name Pudu (普渡) is a slogan from Buddhism Classics, literally meaning "helping people get out of sorrows and troubles". Some people also believe that "Pudu" actually refers to "a ferry ran by Pu's family".
