= 2024 Zhenxiong County landslide =

Natural disaster in Yunnan, China

- Date: 22 January 2024
- Time: 05:51 (UTC+8)
- Location: Liangshui Village, Tangfang Town, Zhenxiong County, Zhaotong, Yunnan, China
- Deaths: 44
- Injuries: 2

The 2024 Zhenxiong County landslide, also known as the "1·22 Zhenxiong Landslide", was a major landslide disaster that occurred at 5:51 a.m. (CST) on 22 January 2024 in the Hexin and Heping Villager Groups of Liangshui Village, Tangfang Town, Zhenxiong County, Zhaotong, Yunnan, China.The disaster killed 44 people and injured two others.

== Cause ==
Following an on-site investigation, an expert panel preliminarily concluded that the landslide was caused by a combination of factors:

1. The area's steep topography created favorable conditions for slope failure.
2. The layered, fractured rock mass was the principal geological factor contributing to the collapse.
3. Continuous infiltration of precipitation prior to the disaster softened weak structural planes within the rock mass. Rain and snowfall immediately before the collapse further increased groundwater accumulation until a critical threshold was reached, ultimately triggering the landslide.

== Incident ==
On 21 January, Liangshui Village in Tangfang Town experienced sleet, although snowfall was relatively light. However, according to China Central Television (CCTV), the landslide site received heavier snowfall during the night of 21 January.

At approximately 5:51 a.m. on 22 January, a landslide suddenly occurred. According to estimates by the natural resources department of the on-site command headquarters, approximately 300,000 cubic metres of earth and rock collapsed.

== Rescue ==
Following the disaster, the Yunnan Provincial Disaster Reduction Committee activated a Level III emergency disaster relief response, deploying 10 loaders, 33 fire engines, and more than 200 rescue personnel to carry out search and rescue operations. Rescue efforts were subsequently expanded to more than 300 personnel with over 50 pieces of rescue equipment and vehicles.

Wang Ning, Secretary of the Yunnan Provincial Committee of the Chinese Communist Party, made arrangements for the emergency response, while Governor Wang Yubo led a provincial task force to the disaster site to direct rescue operations.

By 23 January, the number of rescue personnel had increased to more than 1,000, supported by 45 search-and-rescue dogs and 120 pieces of rescue equipment, including excavators, loaders, and transport vehicles.

At a press conference held by the Command Headquarters for the 1·22 Zhenxiong Landslide Disaster Response at 10:00 p.m. on 25 January, officials announced that the final missing person had been recovered at 8:04 p.m. that day. All 44 missing persons had been located and confirmed dead, marking the completion of the primary search and rescue operation.

The rescue operation lasted approximately 85 hours, involving 28 rescue teams, 1,557 personnel, more than 270 rescue vehicles and pieces of equipment, and 80 search-and-rescue dogs.

== Aftermath ==
Following the disaster, authorities evacuated and temporarily relocated 918 residents from 223 households. Zhenxiong County implemented temporary resettlement measures and began formulating a post-disaster reconstruction plan.Families of those killed were temporarily relocated to government-designated residential communities in the county seat. Other affected households were given the option of staying in centralized resettlement sites or arranging temporary accommodation outside the affected area by staying with relatives or friends or renting housing, with the government providing rental subsidies. Living allowances were also provided to displaced residents.Households accommodated in government resettlement communities were supplied with basic household necessities. Authorities also provided assistance with daily living, material supplies, psychological counselling, medical care, heating, and education to ensure that the basic needs of displaced residents were met.On 26 January, families of those killed in the 1·22 Zhenxiong Landslide began moving into temporary resettlement communities in the county seat. The local government also introduced a living subsidy programme, providing CN¥200 per person per day for the first ten days following the disaster and CN¥35 per person per day for the subsequent six months.
