= Shouwang Hui Ethnic Township =

Shouwang Township Shouwangcacaac Hui Ethnic Township
- Ethnic Township

Chinese transcription(s)
  - Simplified: 守望回族乡
  - Traditional: 守望回族鄉
  - Pinyin: Shǒuwàng Huízú Xiāng
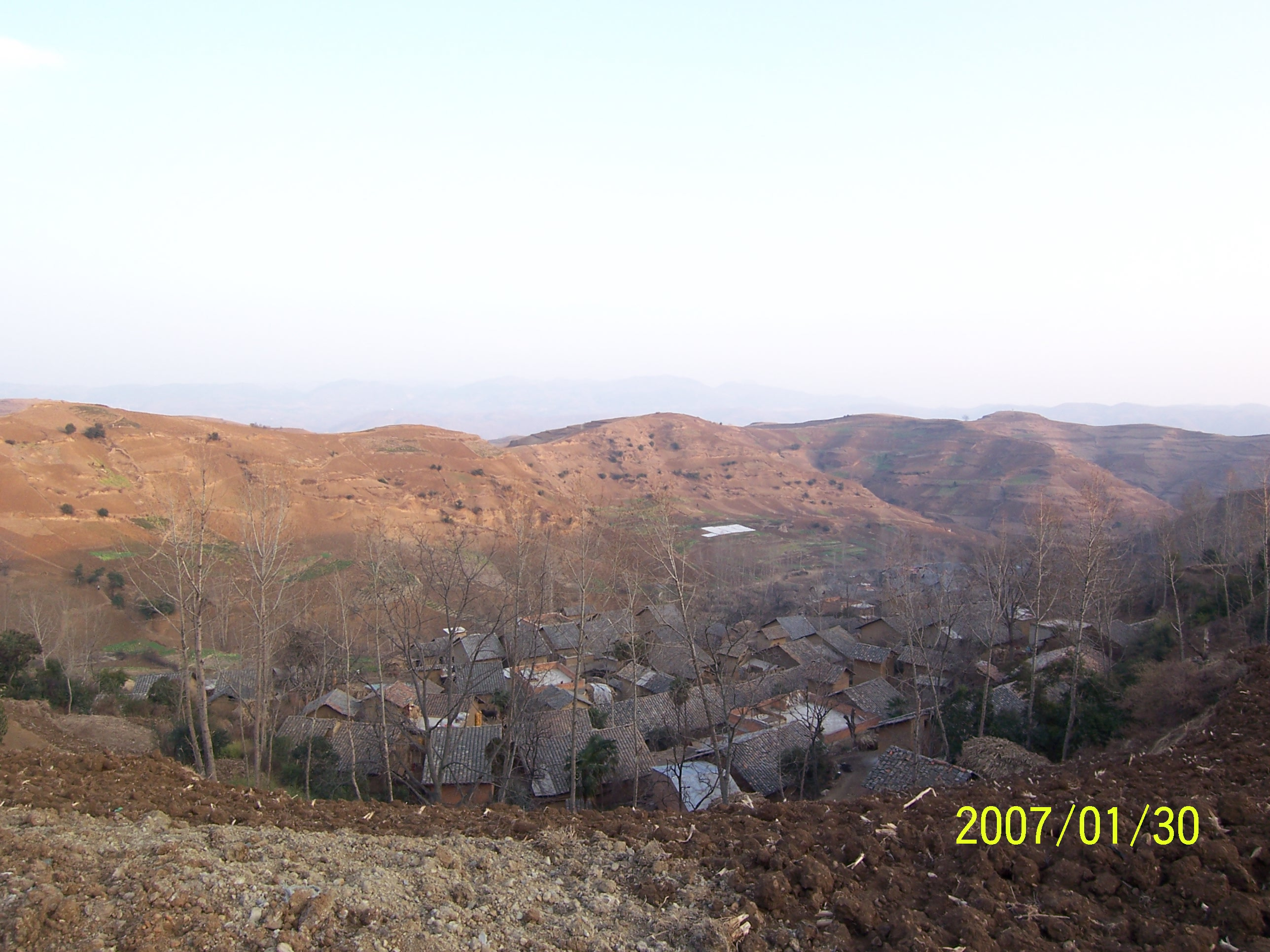
- Rural scenery of Kazi Village in Shouwang Township.

- Location in Yunnan
- Coordinates: 27°15′57″N 103°44′45″E
- Country: China
- Province: Yunnan
- Prefecture: Zhaotong
- District: Zhaoyang District
- Elevation: 1,930 m (6,330 ft)

Population (2015)
  - Total: 40,000
- Time zone: UTC+8 (China Standard)
- Postal code: 657001
- Area code: 0870

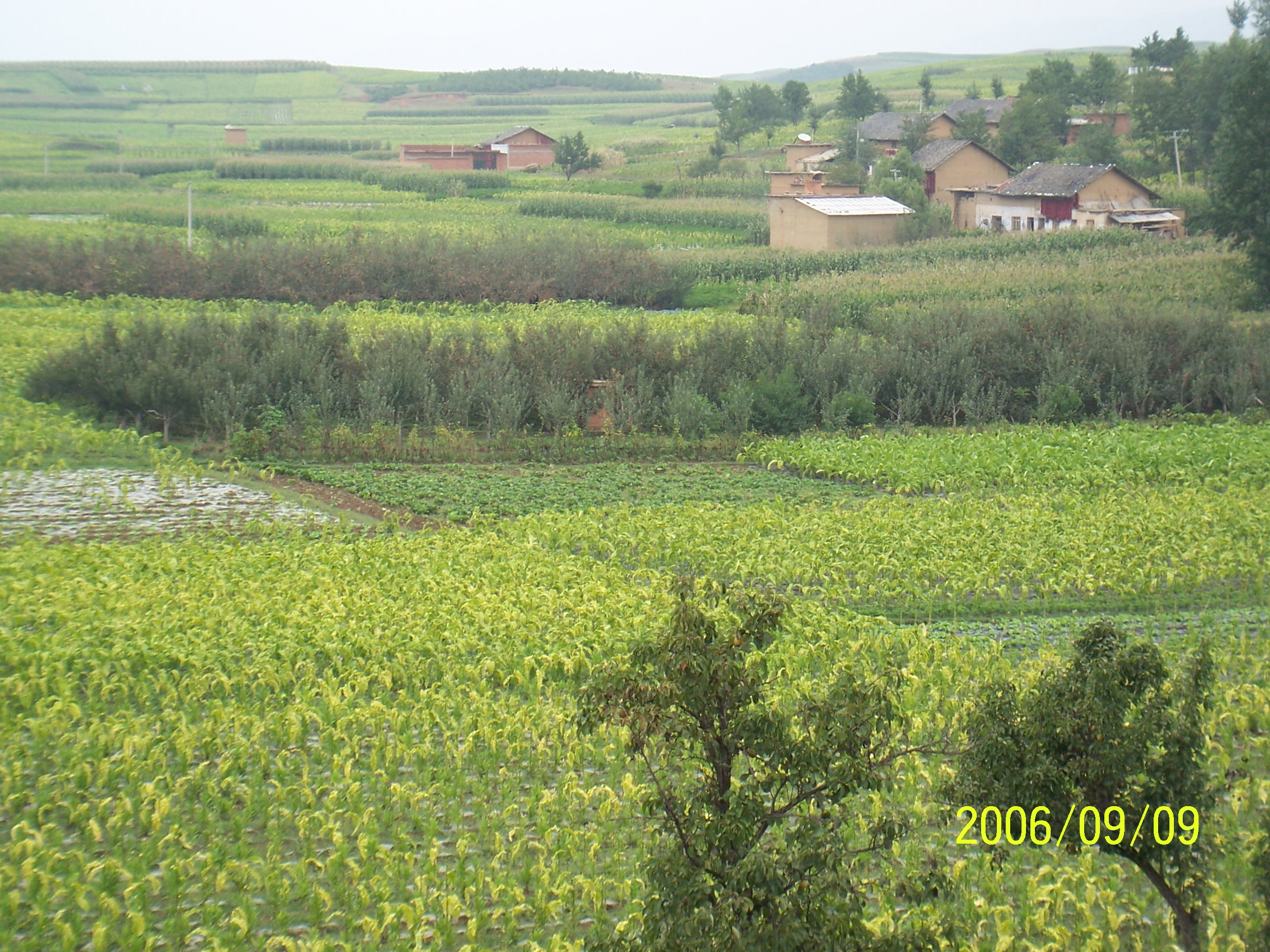
Rural scenery of Baxian Village in Shouwang Township.

Shouwang Township or Shouwang Hui Ethnic Township (simplified Chinese: 守望回族乡; traditional Chinese: 守望回族鄉; pinyin: Shǒuwàng Huízú Xiāng) is a rural ethnic township in Zhaoyang District of Zhaotong, Yunnan, China. As of the 2015 census, it had a population of 40,000. It is surrounded by Fenghuang Subdistrict on the north, Buga Hui Ethnic Township and Yongfeng Town on the west, Xiaolongdong Hui and Yi Ethnic Township on the east, and Zhongshui Town of Weining County on the south.

== Administrative divisions ==
The township is divided into seven villages:

- Shuijingwan Village (水井湾村)
- Kaizi Village (卡子村)
- Baxian Village (八仙村)
- Huluping Village (葫芦坪村)
- Ganhe Village (甘河村)
- Liujiahaizi Village (刘家海子村)
- Maguizha Village (马贵闸村)

== Geography ==
Jingfeng Reservoir (景风水库) is a reservoir and the largest body of water in the township.

=== Climate ===
The township enjoys a plateau monsoon climate, with an average annual temperature of 11 °C (52 °F), total annual rainfall of 750-millimetre (30 in), a frost-free period of 220 days.

== Economy ==
The main industries in and around the township are forestry and farming.

== Religion ==
The locals believe in Islam and the township has two mosques: Baxian Mosque (八仙清真寺) and Songjiashan Mosque (宋家山清真寺), both were originally built in the Qing dynasty (1644–1911).

== Transportation ==
Zhaoyang–Weining Road (昭威公路) passes across the town.

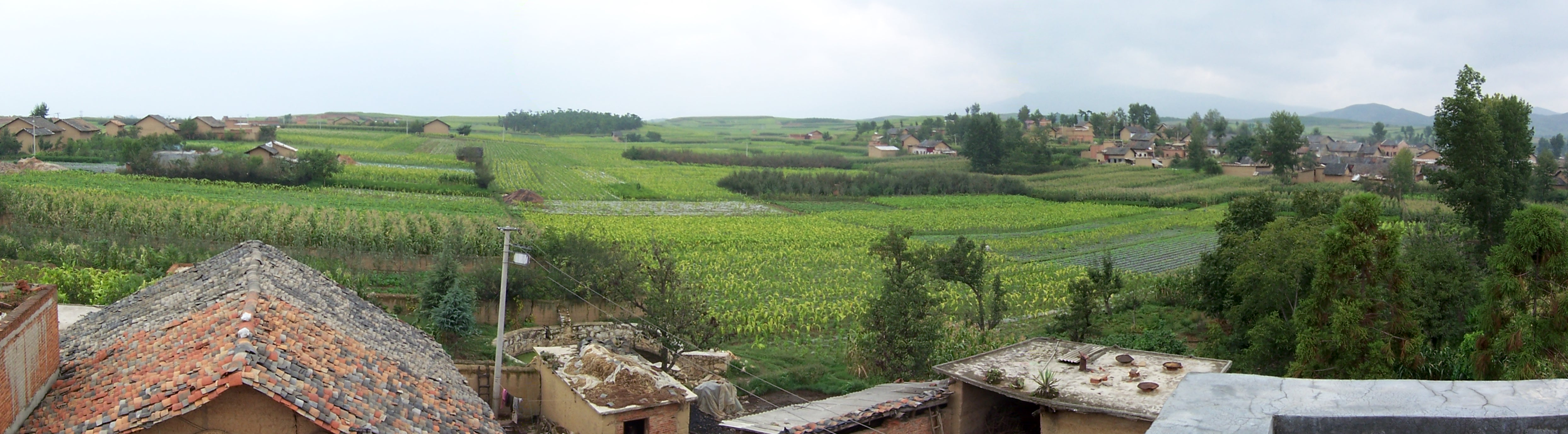
Panorama of Baxian Village in Shouwang Township.
