= Yiliang County =

Yiliang County may refer to:

- Yiliang County, Kunming (宜良), Yunnan
- Yiliang County, Zhaotong (彝良), Yunnan
