= Yiliang County, Zhaotong =

Yiliang County 彝良县
- County
- Location of Yiliang County (red) and Zhaotong City (pink) within Yunnan
- Coordinates: 27°37′37″N 104°02′32″E
- Country: People's Republic of China
- Province: Yunnan
- Prefecture-level city: Zhaotong

Area
  - County: 2,795.76 km^{2} (1,079.45 sq mi)
- Highest elevation: 2,780 m (9,120 ft)
- Lowest elevation: 520 m (1,710 ft)

Population (2020 census)
  - County: 631,538
  - Density: 225.891/km^{2} (585.056/sq mi)
  - Urban: 144,248
  - Rural: 487,290
  - Ethnic minorities: 90,093
- Time zone: UTC+8 (CST)
- Postal code: 657600
- Area code: 0870
- Vehicle registration: 云C
- Website: www.cnyl.gov.cn

Yiliang County (Chinese: 彝良县; pinyin: Yíliáng Xiàn) is a county in the northeast of Yunnan Province, China, bordering the provinces of Sichuan to the northeast and Guizhou to the south. It is under the administration of the prefecture-level city of Zhaotong. In 2020 the population was 631,538 including 14.27% ethnic minorities, most of them Miao (59,920) and Yi (28,406).

It is the home county of general Luo Binghui (罗炳辉) and also known for the plant gastrodia elata.

== Geography ==
Yiliang County borders Zhenxiong County and Weixin County to the east, Weining County and Hezhang County, Guizhou to the south, Zhaoyang District and Daguan County to the west, Yanjin County to the north and Junlian County, Sichuan to the northeast.

== Tourism ==
Yiliang's main attractions are:

- Niujie Ancient Town
- Long and Ding manors
- Shoushi Mountain
- Traditional Miao villages

== Administrative divisions ==
The county seat is Juekui, it will be split into Juekui subdistrict and Fajie subdistrict (发界街道), pending approval from higher government organs.

Towns

- Juekui (角奎镇)
- Luozehe (洛泽河镇)
- Niujie (牛街镇)
- Haizi (海子镇)
- Qiaoshan (荞山镇)
- Long'an (龙安镇)
- Lianghe (两河镇)
- Zhongming (钟鸣镇)
- Xiaocaoba (小草坝镇)
- Longhai (龙海镇)

Townships

- Liuxi Miao ethnic township (柳溪苗族乡)
- Luowang Miao ethnic township (洛旺苗族乡)
- Longjie Miao and Yi ethnic township (龙街苗族彝族乡)
- Kuixiang Miao and Yi ethnic township (奎香苗族彝族乡)
- Shulin Yi and Miao ethnic township (树林彝族苗族乡)

== Climate ==
Climate data for Yiliang, elevation 880 m (2,890 ft), (1991–2020 normals, extremes 1981–2010)
Month	Jan	Feb	Mar	Apr	May	Jun	Jul	Aug	Sep	Oct	Nov	Dec	Year
Record high °C (°F)	27.5 (81.5)	33.6 (92.5)	40.4 (104.7)	40.7 (105.3)	40.9 (105.6)	41.1 (106.0)	40.6 (105.1)	41.4 (106.5)	41.8 (107.2)	36.3 (97.3)	33.3 (91.9)	25.8 (78.4)	41.8 (107.2)
Mean daily maximum °C (°F)	11.3 (52.3)	14.7 (58.5)	19.7 (67.5)	25.1 (77.2)	27.9 (82.2)	29.2 (84.6)	31.8 (89.2)	31.3 (88.3)	27.8 (82.0)	22.1 (71.8)	18.6 (65.5)	13.0 (55.4)	22.7 (72.9)
Daily mean °C (°F)	7.4 (45.3)	9.8 (49.6)	13.8 (56.8)	18.7 (65.7)	21.7 (71.1)	23.6 (74.5)	25.4 (77.7)	24.8 (76.6)	22.0 (71.6)	17.7 (63.9)	14.0 (57.2)	9.1 (48.4)	17.3 (63.2)
Mean daily minimum °C (°F)	4.9 (40.8)	6.8 (44.2)	10.1 (50.2)	14.4 (57.9)	17.5 (63.5)	19.9 (67.8)	21.3 (70.3)	20.8 (69.4)	18.4 (65.1)	15.0 (59.0)	11.2 (52.2)	6.6 (43.9)	13.9 (57.0)
Record low °C (°F)	−3.1 (26.4)	−1.5 (29.3)	−0.2 (31.6)	4.2 (39.6)	8.5 (47.3)	12.1 (53.8)	14.0 (57.2)	13.7 (56.7)	9.9 (49.8)	4.9 (40.8)	−0.2 (31.6)	−2.5 (27.5)	−3.1 (26.4)
Average precipitation mm (inches)	4.3 (0.17)	5.3 (0.21)	14.8 (0.58)	31.9 (1.26)	60.7 (2.39)	130.5 (5.14)	182.9 (7.20)	166.1 (6.54)	96.0 (3.78)	47.7 (1.88)	10.3 (0.41)	2.9 (0.11)	753.4 (29.67)
Average precipitation days (≥ 0.1 mm)	2.7	4.0	5.6	8.4	12.3	17.2	18.0	17.2	14.6	12.3	4.2	2.2	118.7
Average snowy days	0.8	0.5	0	0	0	0	0	0	0	0	0	0.3	1.6
Average relative humidity (%)	66	65	63	62	65	73	76	76	76	76	70	68	70
Mean monthly sunshine hours	56.5	74.9	111.5	128.4	122.2	97.6	138.3	141.4	103.2	64.2	75.7	60.3	1,174.2
Percentage possible sunshine	17	24	30	33	29	24	33	35	28	18	24	19	26
Source: China Meteorological Administration
