= Luokan, Yunnan =

Luokan 罗坎镇
- Town
- Location in Yunnan
- Coordinates: 27°43′51″N 104°40′29″E
- Country: People's Republic of China
- Province: Yunnan
- Prefecture-level city: Zhaotong
- County: Zhenxiong
- Village-level divisions: 17 villages
- Elevation: 1,023 m (3,356 ft)
- Time zone: UTC+8 (China Standard)
- Postal code: 0870

Luokan (simplified Chinese: 罗坎; traditional Chinese: 羅坎; pinyin: Luókǎn) is a town of Zhenxiong County in northeastern Yunnan province, China, located 38 kilometres (24 mi) northwest of the county seat and 104 km (65 mi) northeast of Zhaotong as the crow flies. As of 2011, it had 17 villages under its administration.
