= Zhenxiong County =

Zhenxiong County 镇雄县
- County
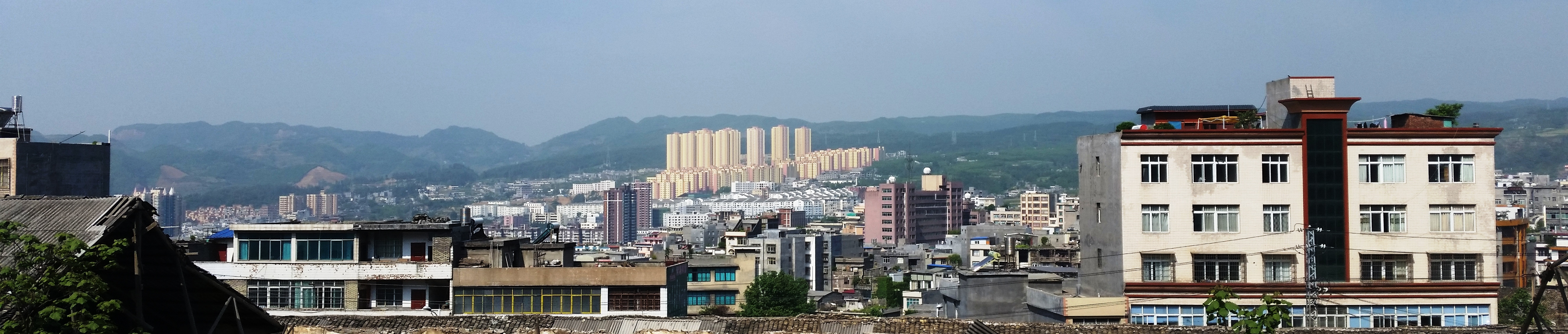
- Zhenxiong County, in Zhaotong City, Yunnan Province, China

- Location of Zhenxiong County (red) in Zhaotong City (pink) and Yunnan Province

- Location of the county seat in Yunnan
- Coordinates: 27°27′N 104°52′E
- Country: People's Republic of China
- Province: Yunnan
- Prefecture-level city: Zhaotong
- Township-level divisions: 16 towns 10 townships 2 ethnic townships
- County seat: Wufeng Town (乌峰镇)

Area
  - Total: 3,785 km^{2} (1,461 sq mi)
  - Land: 3,785 km^{2} (1,461 sq mi)
- Elevation: 1,684 m (5,525 ft)

Population (2020)
  - Total: 1,349,795
  - Density: 356.6/km^{2} (923.6/sq mi)
- Time zone: UTC+8 (China Standard Time)
- Postal code: 657200
- Area code: 0870
- Website: http://www.zx.gov.cn/

Zhenxiong County (simplified Chinese: 镇雄县; traditional Chinese: 鎮雄縣; pinyin: Zhènxióng Xiàn) is a county in the northeast of Yunnan province, China, under the administration of Zhaotong prefecture and bordering Guizhou and Sichuan.

== Geography ==
Zhengxiong County is located in the northeastern part of Yunnan province. It has an area of 3,785 square kilometres (1,461 sq mi), a latitude ranging from 27° 17' to 27° 50' N and a longitude ranging from 104° 18' to 105° 19' E. The county has a maximum north–south extent of 54 km (34 mi) and a maximum east–west width of 99 km (62 mi). It borders Xuyong County (Sichuan) to the east across the Chishui River, Hezhang County (Guizhou) to the south, Yiliang County to the west, and Weixin County to the north. The village of Delong (德隆村) in Potou Township (坡头乡) is located near the triple intersection point of the three provinces, and is so nicknamed the "fowl cry of the three provinces" (鸡鸣三省). By road, the prefectural seat of Zhaotong is 265 km (165 mi) to the west, provincial capital Kunming is 598 km (372 mi) to the southwest, Guiyang is 326 km (203 mi) to the southeast, Chongqing is 505 km (314 mi) to the northeast, and Chengdu 618 km (384 mi) to the north-northwest.

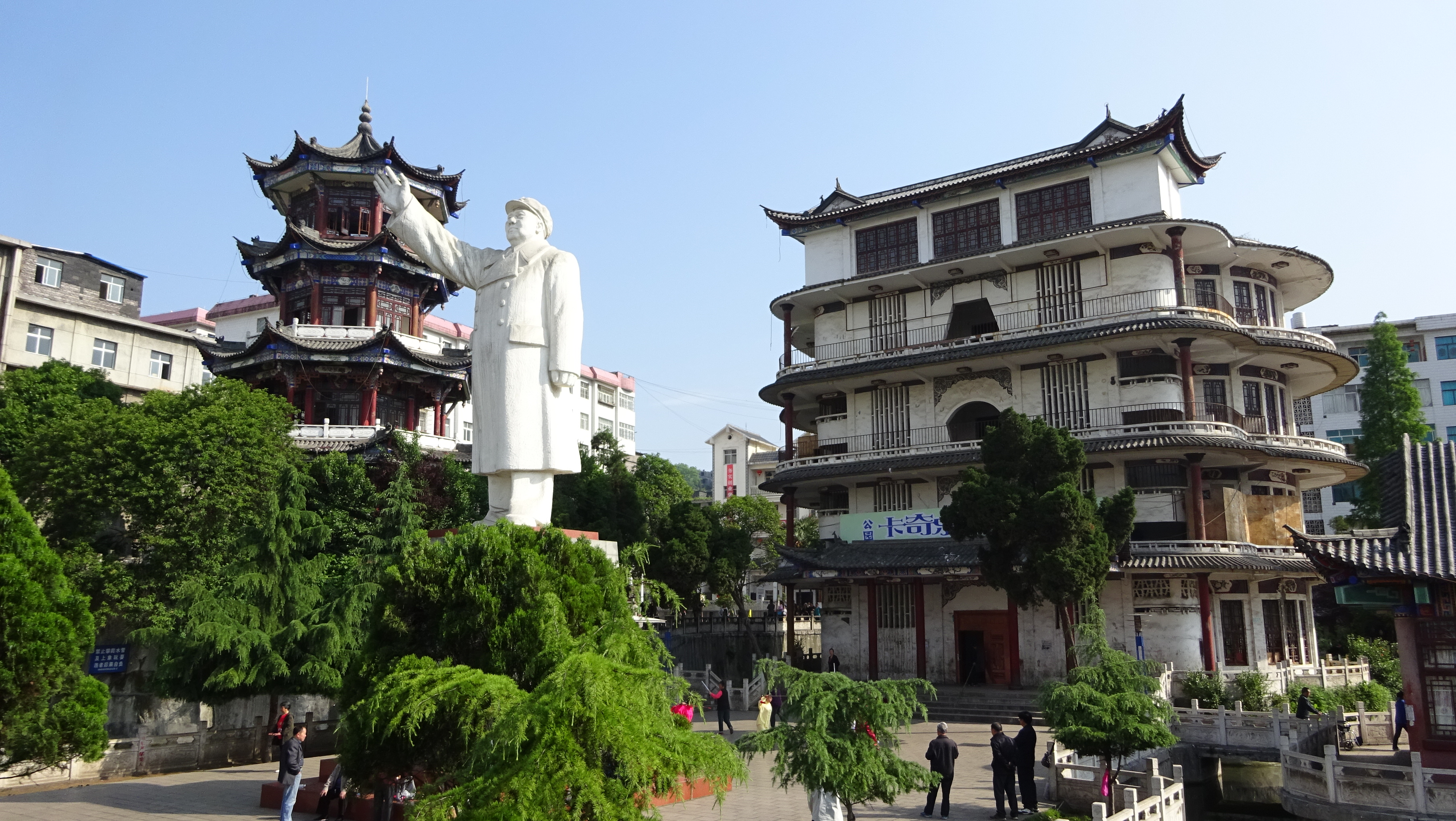
Zhenxiong People's Park

Zhenxiong is located amongst the northern slopes of the Yunnan–Guizhou Plateau, with elevations increasing from northeast to southwest, although the central and southern areas are more level. Elevations range from 2,416 m (7,927 ft) at Mount Jiayao (戛么山), in the village of Maiche (麦车村), An'er Township (安尔乡), down to 630 m (2,070 ft) in the village of Tongping (桐坪村), Luokan Town (罗坎镇). Most of the county has a subtropical highland climate; the annual mean is 11.3 °C (52.3 °F), sunshine totals 1,341 hours annually, the frost-free period is 218.6 days, and annual precipitation averages 914.6 millimetres (36.01 in).

=== Climate ===
Climate data for Zhenxiong, elevation 1,645 m (5,397 ft), (1991–2020 normals, extremes 1981–2010)
Month	Jan	Feb	Mar	Apr	May	Jun	Jul	Aug	Sep	Oct	Nov	Dec	Year
Record high °C (°F)	28.5 (83.3)	28.5 (83.3)	32.6 (90.7)	32.0 (89.6)	34.8 (94.6)	32.0 (89.6)	32.7 (90.9)	33.5 (92.3)	33.7 (92.7)	29.2 (84.6)	26.6 (79.9)	23.6 (74.5)	34.8 (94.6)
Mean daily maximum °C (°F)	6.0 (42.8)	9.5 (49.1)	14.0 (57.2)	18.9 (66.0)	21.7 (71.1)	23.4 (74.1)	26.1 (79.0)	25.8 (78.4)	22.4 (72.3)	16.8 (62.2)	13.4 (56.1)	7.6 (45.7)	17.1 (62.8)
Daily mean °C (°F)	1.8 (35.2)	4.3 (39.7)	8.3 (46.9)	13.0 (55.4)	16.1 (61.0)	18.4 (65.1)	20.7 (69.3)	20.2 (68.4)	17.2 (63.0)	12.5 (54.5)	8.4 (47.1)	3.4 (38.1)	12.0 (53.6)
Mean daily minimum °C (°F)	−0.3 (31.5)	1.6 (34.9)	4.9 (40.8)	9.2 (48.6)	12.3 (54.1)	15.2 (59.4)	17.0 (62.6)	16.4 (61.5)	13.9 (57.0)	10.1 (50.2)	5.7 (42.3)	1.1 (34.0)	8.9 (48.1)
Record low °C (°F)	−8.9 (16.0)	−7.5 (18.5)	−6.3 (20.7)	−0.8 (30.6)	1.4 (34.5)	7.9 (46.2)	7.2 (45.0)	8.5 (47.3)	4.5 (40.1)	−1.4 (29.5)	−4.2 (24.4)	−11.2 (11.8)	−11.2 (11.8)
Average precipitation mm (inches)	16.8 (0.66)	15.9 (0.63)	26.4 (1.04)	53.0 (2.09)	81.4 (3.20)	145.8 (5.74)	175.0 (6.89)	158.5 (6.24)	92.5 (3.64)	63.2 (2.49)	21.3 (0.84)	14.9 (0.59)	864.7 (34.05)
Average precipitation days (≥ 0.1 mm)	19.1	16.2	16.6	16.2	17.7	19.6	17.8	16.7	16.3	19.1	14.4	18.5	208.2
Average snowy days	10.0	6.2	2.4	0.1	0	0	0	0	0.1	0.2	1.0	5.8	25.8
Average relative humidity (%)	87	84	81	78	79	83	81	81	83	87	85	87	83
Mean monthly sunshine hours	53.2	75.3	106.6	128.0	124.1	100.5	156.0	152.9	110.8	70.0	83.0	60.0	1,220.4
Percentage possible sunshine	16	24	29	33	30	24	37	38	30	20	26	19	27
Source: China Meteorological Administration

== Administrative divisions ==
Zhenxiong County consists of 3 districts, 20 towns, 5 townships, 2 ethnic townships:

Level	No.	Pinyin name	Simplified Chinese name
District	1	Wufeng District	乌峰街道
	2	Nantai District	南台街道
	3	Jiufu District	旧府街道
Town	1	Poji Town	泼机镇
	2	Heishu Town	黑树镇
	3	Muxiang Town	母享镇
	4	Dawan Town	大湾镇
	5	Yile Town	以勒镇
	6	Chishuiyuan Town	赤水源镇
	7	Mangbu Town	芒部镇
	8	Yuhe Town	雨河镇
	9	Rokan Town	牛场镇
	10	Niuchang Town	牛场镇
	11	Wude Town	五德镇
	12	Potou Town	坡头镇
	13	Yigu Town	以古镇
	14	Changba Town	场坝镇
	15	Tangfang Town	塘房镇
	16	Zhongtun Town	中屯镇
	17	Muzhuo Town	木卓镇
	18	Yanyuan Town	盐源镇
	19	Wanchang Town	碗厂镇
	20	Pingshang Town	坪上镇
Township	1	Yudong Township	鱼洞乡
	2	Hualang Township	花朗乡
	3	Jianshan Township	尖山乡
	4	Shanshu Township	杉树乡
	5	Huashan Township	花山乡
Ethnic Township	1	Guozhu Yi Ethnic Township	果珠彝族乡
	2	Linkou Yi and Miao Ethnic Township	林口彝族苗族乡

== Demographics ==
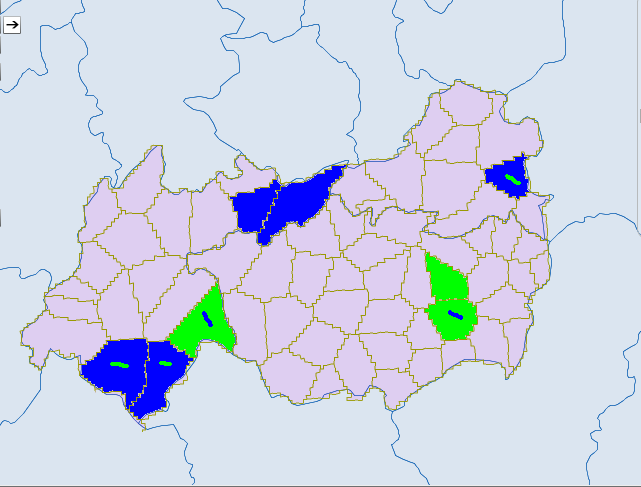
Ethnic townships in Zhenxiong County. Light green - Yi. Blue - Miao.

Most people in Zhenxiong County speak Standard Chinese (commonly called "Mandarin"), which is used in the media, by the government, and as the language of instruction in education. A notable exception is the Yi people, who commonly speak the Yi language. The other significant minority group living in Zhenxiong County is the Miao people, who live at higher elevations in the county.

== Economy ==
Zhenxiong possesses rich mineral resources (in total 30 types), including coal, pyrite, marble, and cryolite. Among them, coal and pyrite have a very wide distribution with richer reserves. The prospective reserves and industrial reserves of coal are 7.4 million tons and 4.517 million tons, respectively. The former accounts for 28.01% of provincial output, and the latter is about 17.1%.

== Transport ==
=== Highways ===
The main road passing through Zhenxiong County is China Provincial Road (302 Shengdao), which is a shengdao or shoudou, or provincial road. Other important provincial roads include (212 Shengdao) and (324 Shengdao). China County Road (252 Xiandao) and (253 Xiandao) are important xiandao, or county-level roads that also pass through Zhenxiong County.

From Zhenxiong County, it is roughly 320 km to Guiyang, 500 km to Chongqing, 535 km to Chengdu, 570 km to Kunming, 900 km to Nanning, 1200 km to Xi'an, 1220 km to Guangzhou, 1330 km to Shenzhen, 1570 km to Lanzhou, 1790 km to Xiamen, and 2250 km to Beijing.

=== Airports ===
- Bijie Feixiong Airport (IATA: BFJ, ICAO: ZUBJ), with flights to Beijing-Nanyuan, Chengdu, Chongqing, Guangzhou, Guiyang, Hangzhou, Kunming, Lanzhou, Nanning, Sanya, Shanghai-Hongqiao, Shenzhen, Xi'an, and Xiamen, is approximately 100 km by ground transport from Zhenxiong County.
- Zhaotong Airport (IATA: ZAT, ICAO: ZPZT), with flights to Beijing-Nanyuan, Chengdu, Chongqing, Guiyang, and Kunming, is approximately 260 km by ground transport from Zhenxiong County.
