= Zhaoyang, Zhaotong =

Zhaoyang 昭阳区
- District
- Location of Zhaoyang District (red) and Zhaotong City (pink) within Yunnan

- Location within China Zhaoyang (China)
- Coordinates: 27°19′N 103°42′E
- Country: China
- Province: Yunnan
- Prefecture-level city: Zhaotong
- District seat: Fenghuang Subdistrict

Area
  - Total: 2,240 km^{2} (860 sq mi)

Population (2020 census)
  - Total: 911,766
  - Density: 407/km^{2} (1,050/sq mi)
- Postal code: 657000
- Area code: 0870
- Website: www.zyq.gov.cn

Zhaoyang District (Chinese: 昭阳区; pinyin: Zhāoyáng Qū) is the only district and the seat of the city of Zhaotong, in the northeast of Yunnan Province, China. It borders the provinces of Guizhou to the east and Sichuan to the west.

== Geography ==
Zhaoyang District borders Weining County, Guizhou to the east, Ludian County and Qiaojia County to the south, Jinyang County, Sichuan across the Jinsha River to the west, and Yiliang County, Daguan County and Yongshan County to the north.

== Administrative divisions ==
Zhaoyang County has 3 subdistricts, 10 towns, 3 townships and 4 ethnic townships.

3 subdistricts

- Fenghuang (凤凰街道)
- Longquan (龙泉街道)
- Miaoba (太平街道)

10 towns

- Jiupu (旧圃镇)
- Yongfeng (永丰镇)
- Beizha (北闸镇)
- Panhe (盘河镇)
- Jing'an (靖安镇)
- Sayu (洒渔镇)
- Leju (乐居镇)
- Sujiayuan (苏家院镇)
- Dashanbao (大山包镇)
- Yanshan (炎山镇)

3 townships

- Sujia (苏甲乡)
- Dazhaizi (大寨子乡)
- Tianba (田坝乡)

4 ethnic townships

- Buga Hui Ethnic Township (布嘎回族乡)
- Shouwang Hui Ethnic Township (守望回族乡)
- Xiaolongdong Hui and Yi Ethnic Township (小龙洞回族彝族乡)
- Qinggangling Hui and Yi Ethnic Township (青岗岭回族彝族乡)

== Climate ==
Climate data for Zhaoyang District, Zhaotong, elevation 1,950 m (6,400 ft), (1991–2020 normals, extremes 1981–2010)
Month	Jan	Feb	Mar	Apr	May	Jun	Jul	Aug	Sep	Oct	Nov	Dec	Year
Record high °C (°F)	24.7 (76.5)	25.9 (78.6)	30.3 (86.5)	31.2 (88.2)	33.6 (92.5)	32.5 (90.5)	32.7 (90.9)	31.5 (88.7)	33.3 (91.9)	28.5 (83.3)	25.1 (77.2)	23.2 (73.8)	33.6 (92.5)
Mean daily maximum °C (°F)	10.1 (50.2)	13.1 (55.6)	17.5 (63.5)	21.1 (70.0)	23.1 (73.6)	24.0 (75.2)	25.5 (77.9)	25.3 (77.5)	22.4 (72.3)	17.7 (63.9)	15.3 (59.5)	10.5 (50.9)	18.8 (65.8)
Daily mean °C (°F)	2.6 (36.7)	5.3 (41.5)	9.1 (48.4)	13.4 (56.1)	16.3 (61.3)	18.3 (64.9)	20.0 (68.0)	19.5 (67.1)	16.8 (62.2)	12.3 (54.1)	8.5 (47.3)	3.7 (38.7)	12.1 (53.9)
Mean daily minimum °C (°F)	−1.4 (29.5)	0.8 (33.4)	4.2 (39.6)	8.7 (47.7)	12.0 (53.6)	14.8 (58.6)	16.3 (61.3)	15.8 (60.4)	13.3 (55.9)	9.4 (48.9)	4.6 (40.3)	0.1 (32.2)	8.2 (46.8)
Record low °C (°F)	−8.4 (16.9)	−8.7 (16.3)	−6.9 (19.6)	−2.7 (27.1)	−0.1 (31.8)	7.4 (45.3)	7.5 (45.5)	7.0 (44.6)	3.6 (38.5)	−0.8 (30.6)	−5.5 (22.1)	−10.4 (13.3)	−10.4 (13.3)
Average precipitation mm (inches)	8.5 (0.33)	9.6 (0.38)	16.6 (0.65)	29.3 (1.15)	57.2 (2.25)	128.3 (5.05)	153.3 (6.04)	125.2 (4.93)	77.2 (3.04)	55.1 (2.17)	12.4 (0.49)	5.3 (0.21)	678 (26.69)
Average precipitation days (≥ 0.1 mm)	5.4	5.9	7.0	9.3	12.7	17.7	17.1	16.7	15.2	14.1	5.9	4.8	131.8
Average snowy days	9.1	6.5	2.6	0.2	0	0	0	0	0	0	1.4	5.3	25.1
Average relative humidity (%)	73	68	67	66	70	77	77	77	79	81	77	76	74
Mean monthly sunshine hours	140.6	154.3	193.3	196.4	178.2	123.2	151.5	159.2	129.0	103.2	143.4	125.0	1,797.3
Percentage possible sunshine	43	49	52	51	43	30	36	40	35	29	45	39	41
Source 1: China Meteorological Administration
Source 2: Weather China

Climate data for Dashanbao Town, Zhaoyang District (1991–2018 normals)
Month	Jan	Feb	Mar	Apr	May	Jun	Jul	Aug	Sep	Oct	Nov	Dec	Year
Mean daily maximum °C (°F)	5.6 (42.1)	8.1 (46.6)	11.9 (53.4)	14.9 (58.8)	16.5 (61.7)	16.8 (62.2)	17.8 (64.0)	17.5 (63.5)	15.5 (59.9)	11.8 (53.2)	9.4 (48.9)	6.5 (43.7)	12.7 (54.8)
Daily mean °C (°F)	−0.5 (31.1)	1.6 (34.9)	4.9 (40.8)	8.3 (46.9)	10.8 (51.4)	12.5 (54.5)	13.8 (56.8)	13.4 (56.1)	11.3 (52.3)	7.7 (45.9)	3.9 (39.0)	0.7 (33.3)	7.4 (45.3)
Mean daily minimum °C (°F)	−6.6 (20.1)	−5.0 (23.0)	−2.0 (28.4)	1.6 (34.9)	5.1 (41.2)	8.2 (46.8)	9.9 (49.8)	9.2 (48.6)	7.1 (44.8)	3.6 (38.5)	−1.6 (29.1)	−5.1 (22.8)	2.0 (35.7)
Average precipitation mm (inches)	6.0 (0.24)	7.4 (0.29)	19.4 (0.76)	48.8 (1.92)	88.0 (3.46)	186.5 (7.34)	172.9 (6.81)	147.8 (5.82)	135.6 (5.34)	73.6 (2.90)	13.7 (0.54)	4.8 (0.19)	904.5 (35.61)
Source: Baidu
