= Buga Hui Ethnic Township =

Ethnic township in Yunnan, China

Buga Township Buga Hui Ethnic Township
- Ethnic Township

Chinese transcription(s)
  - Simplified: 布嘎回族乡
  - Traditional: 布嘎回族鄉
  - Pinyin: Bùgǎ Huízú Xiāng
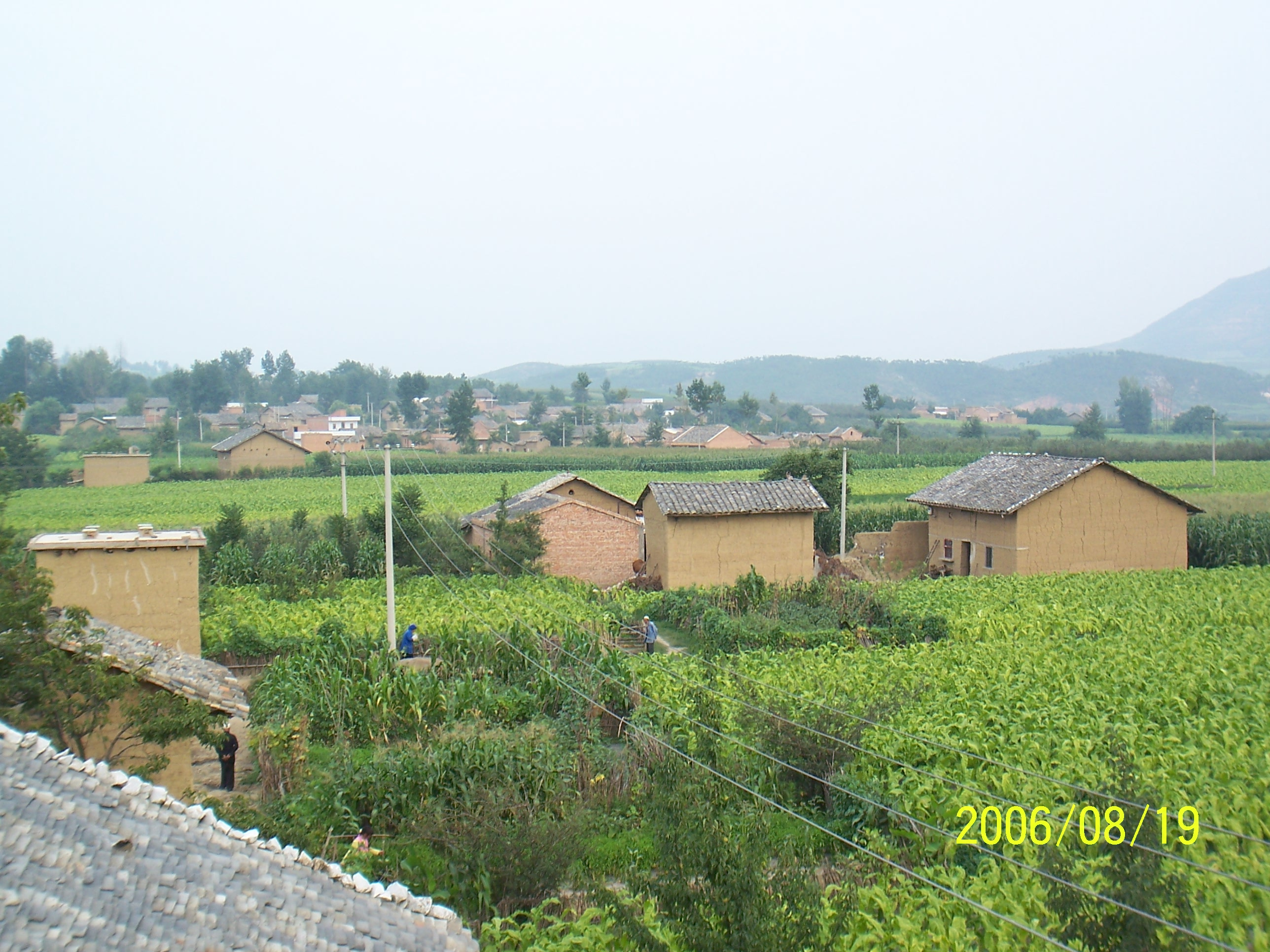
- Rural scenery of Hualuping Village in Buga Township.

- Location in Yunnan
- Coordinates: 27°11′54″N 103°42′20″E
- Country: China
- Province: Yunnan
- Prefecture: Zhaotong
- District: Zhaoyang District

Area
  - Total: 97.4 km^{2} (37.6 sq mi)
- Elevation: 1,970 m (6,460 ft)

Population (2015)
  - Total: 27,000
  - Density: 280/km^{2} (720/sq mi)
- Time zone: UTC+8 (China Standard)
- Postal code: 657013
- Area code: 0870

Buga Township or Buga Hui Ethnic Township (simplified Chinese: 布嘎回族乡; traditional Chinese: 布嘎回族鄉; pinyin: Bùgǎ Huízú Xiāng) is a rural ethnic township in Zhaoyang District of Zhaotong, Yunnan, China. As of the 2015 census it had a population of 27,000 and an area of 97.4-square-kilometre (37.6 sq mi). It borders Shouwang Township and Zhongshui Township of Weining County in the east, Taoyuan Township of Ludian County in the southwest, and Yongfeng Town in the northwest.

== Administrative division ==
The township is divided into 5 villages:

- Buga Village (布嘎村)
- Baishi Village (白石村)
- Xinjie Village (新街村)
- Hualuping Village (花鹿坪村)
- Yingshui Village (迎水村)

== Geography ==
The township has three reservoirs: Baoshanxu Reservoir (保山圩水库), Sujiaba Reservoir (苏家坝水库) and Shishuijing Reservoir (石水井水库).

Di River (低河) flows through the township.

=== Climate ===
The township enjoys a plateau monsoon climate, with an average annual temperature of 11 °C (52 °F), total annual rainfall of 750-millimetre (30 in), a frost-free period of 220 days.

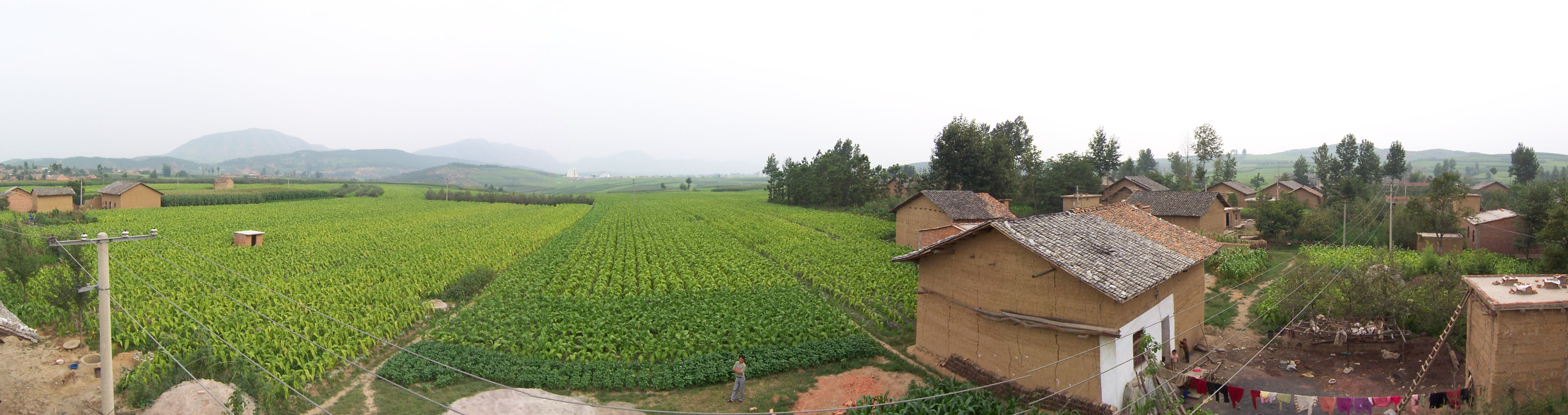
Panorama of Hualuping Village in Buga Township.

== Economy ==
The economy is supported primarily by farming, ranching, and mineral resources.

== Education ==
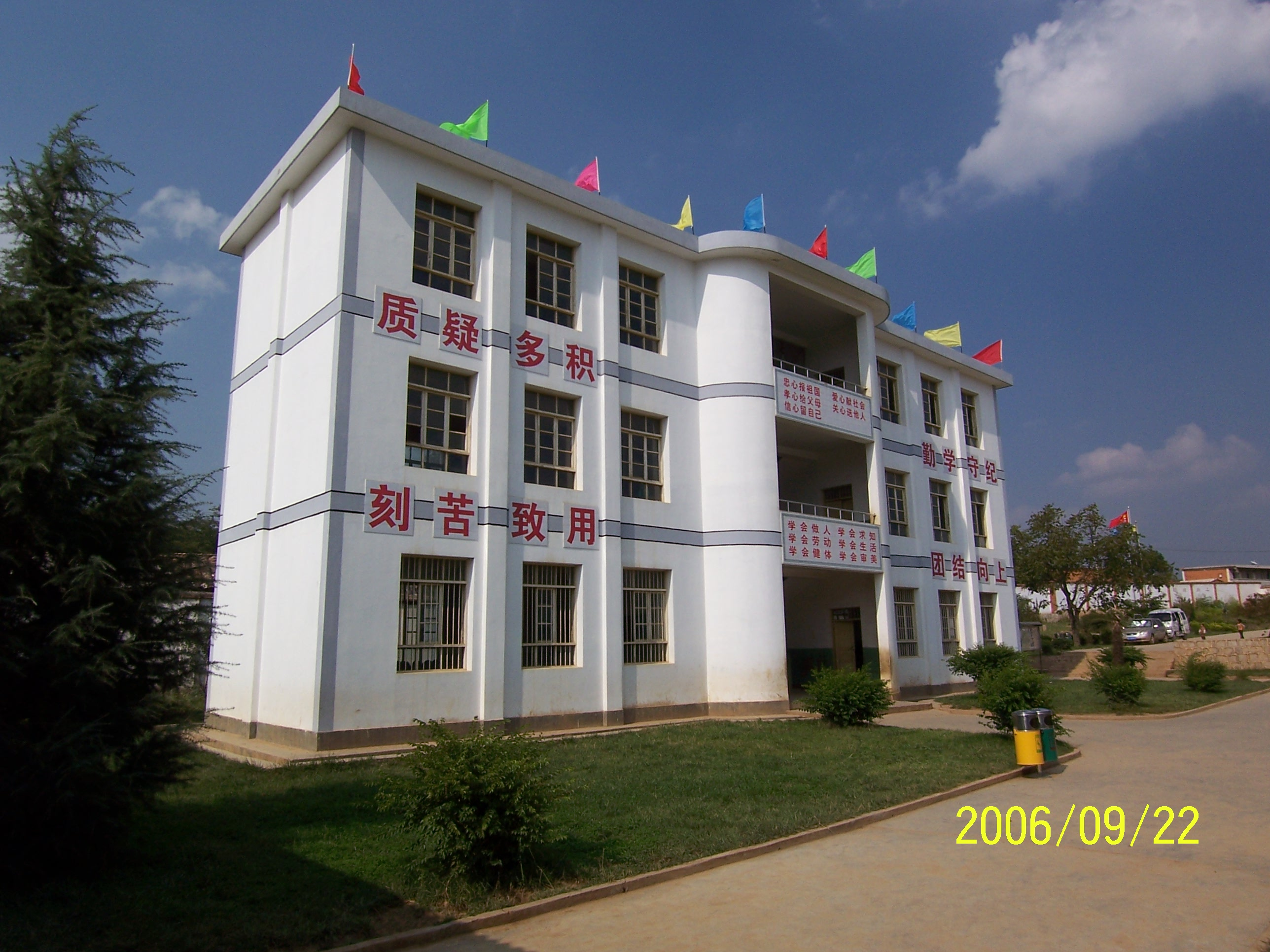
Teaching building in Hualuping School.

There are 9 primary schools in the township.

== Religion ==
The locals believe in Islam and the township has 32 mosques.
