= Yanjin County, Yunnan =

Yanjin County 盐津县
- County
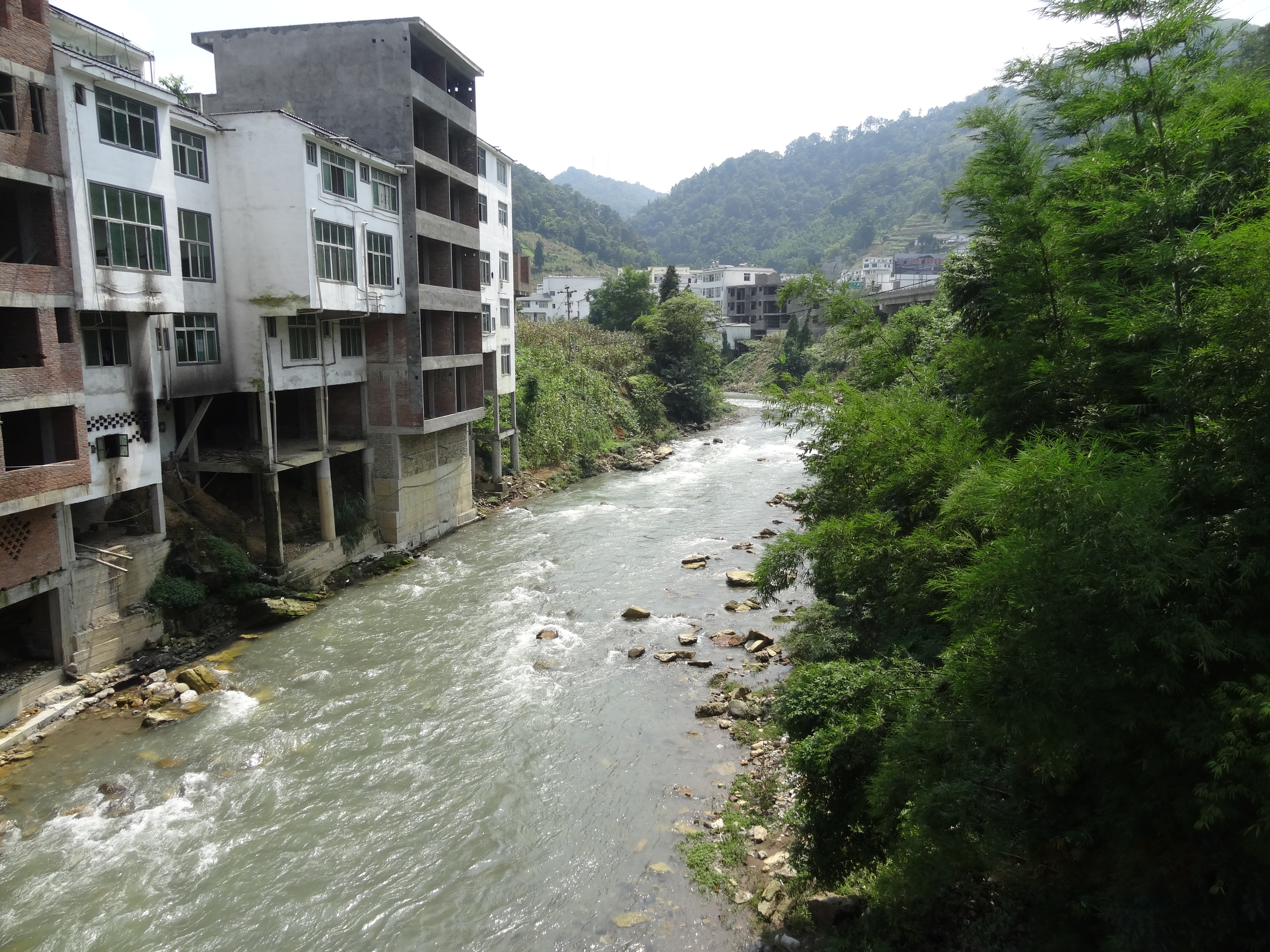
- Zhonghe town in Yanjin County

- Location of Yanjin County (red) and Zhaotong City (pink) within Yunnan
- Coordinates: 28°06′32″N 104°14′02″E
- Country: People's Republic of China
- Province: Yunnan
- Prefecture-level city: Zhaotong

Area
  - Total: 1,416 km^{2} (547 sq mi)

Population
  - Total: 453,096
  - Density: 320.0/km^{2} (828.8/sq mi)
- Time zone: UTC+8 (CST)
- Postal code: 657500
- Area code: 0870
- Website: www.ynyj.gov.cn

Yanjin County (simplified Chinese: 盐津县; traditional Chinese: 鹽津縣; pinyin: Yánjīn Xiàn) is located in the northeast of Yunnan Province, China, bordering Sichuan Province to the north and east. It is under the administration of the prefecture-level city of Zhaotong.

Situated on the banks of the narrow Heng River (Note: Often miscited as the Nanxi river, which is in fact a different river in southern Yunnan.) valley, a tributary of the Yangtze, the town of Yanjing, Yanjin's county seat, has been referred to as the "World's Narrowest City." The buildings of the city are situated on tall pillars, which is a preemptive measure toward water-level rise during periods of heavy flooding. Videos of the city routinely go viral because of its uniqueness and the surrounding natural environment, attracting much attention to the city.

The city is within the valley, along with a highway and a railway but does not have a high-speed train.

Daily slow train service 5635/5636 between Neijiang 内江 and Zhaotong 昭通 passes through Yanjin 盐津 and Yanjinbei 盐津北 (Yanjin North) stations. Yanjinbei Station is closer to the city center.

== History ==
Since at least the Qin Dynasty (221–206 BCE), the area of Yanjin was home to the Bo people.

During a Duanwu Festival celebration in the late 1800s or early 1900s at Yanjin, a bridge that spanned the Heng River collapsed and four hundred people were drowned. This led to the bridge being rebuilt with walls and a roof. The county was named after the city of Yanjin when it was formed in 1917.

In July 2006, a 5.1 magnitude earthquake left 22 dead, 106 injured and more than 6,000 homes demolished.

In 2021, management practices to institute an urban rain flood ecosystem were underway in Yanjin through use of the sponge city approach to prepare for high flooding.

== Climate ==
Climate data for Yanjin, elevation 449 m (1,473 ft), (1991–2020 normals, extremes 1981–present)
Month	Jan	Feb	Mar	Apr	May	Jun	Jul	Aug	Sep	Oct	Nov	Dec	Year
Record high °C (°F)	22.2 (72.0)	36.8 (98.2)	38.6 (101.5)	37.0 (98.6)	40.1 (104.2)	40.0 (104.0)	40.8 (105.4)	41.4 (106.5)	42.0 (107.6)	32.8 (91.0)	28.0 (82.4)	23.0 (73.4)	42.0 (107.6)
Mean daily maximum °C (°F)	11.4 (52.5)	14.3 (57.7)	19.4 (66.9)	25.0 (77.0)	28.2 (82.8)	29.8 (85.6)	32.5 (90.5)	32.4 (90.3)	27.8 (82.0)	22.0 (71.6)	18.4 (65.1)	12.9 (55.2)	22.8 (73.1)
Daily mean °C (°F)	8.2 (46.8)	10.3 (50.5)	14.3 (57.7)	19.0 (66.2)	22.1 (71.8)	24.2 (75.6)	26.4 (79.5)	26.1 (79.0)	22.8 (73.0)	18.3 (64.9)	14.4 (57.9)	9.7 (49.5)	18.0 (64.4)
Mean daily minimum °C (°F)	6.3 (43.3)	7.9 (46.2)	11.1 (52.0)	15.2 (59.4)	18.3 (64.9)	21.0 (69.8)	22.8 (73.0)	22.6 (72.7)	20.1 (68.2)	16.3 (61.3)	12.2 (54.0)	7.8 (46.0)	15.1 (59.2)
Record low °C (°F)	−0.5 (31.1)	−0.2 (31.6)	1.8 (35.2)	6.2 (43.2)	10.8 (51.4)	15.8 (60.4)	16.8 (62.2)	16.9 (62.4)	13.1 (55.6)	6.0 (42.8)	3.2 (37.8)	−1.3 (29.7)	−1.3 (29.7)
Average precipitation mm (inches)	18.5 (0.73)	21.2 (0.83)	37.1 (1.46)	61.0 (2.40)	88.5 (3.48)	153.0 (6.02)	230.9 (9.09)	254.6 (10.02)	124.0 (4.88)	68.3 (2.69)	26.3 (1.04)	18 (0.7)	1,101.4 (43.34)
Average precipitation days (≥ 0.1 mm)	16.2	14.6	16.2	15.7	16.9	19.3	18.8	17.5	17.8	21.1	15.2	15.6	204.9
Average snowy days	0.2	0.2	0	0	0	0	0	0	0	0	0	0.2	0.6
Average relative humidity (%)	82	81	78	76	76	82	82	82	84	87	83	83	81
Mean monthly sunshine hours	32.2	37.0	64.8	91.9	94.1	78.6	127.5	130.4	65.3	35.6	43.4	34.2	835
Percentage possible sunshine	10	12	17	24	22	19	30	32	18	10	14	11	18
Source: China Meteorological Administration

== Cuisine ==
=== Yanjin Douhua ===
Yanjin Douhua is a famous local dish and a common home-style dish. Its flavor is related to the soybeans grown under the special geographical conditions of the area.

=== Piglet Cake ===
A dish of steamed cakes filled with sugar, pork fat, candied tangerine peel, osmanthus or rose sugar and sesame seeds. So named due to their white and glossy appearance, resembling piglets.

=== Smoked Pork Noodles ===
The soul of this noodle dish lies in its topping—deep-fried and then braised pork cubes (smoked pork).

== Administrative divisions ==
Yanjin County has 6 towns and 4 townships.

6 towns

- Yanjing (盐井镇)
- Pu'er (普洱镇)
- Dousha (豆沙镇)
- Zhonghe (中和镇)
- Miaoba (庙坝镇)
- Shizi (柿子镇)

4 townships

- Xinglong (兴隆乡)
- Luoyan (落雁乡)
- Tantou (滩头乡)
- Niuzhai (牛寨乡)
