= Weixin County =

Coordinates: 27.85°N 105.033°E

Weixin County 威信县
- County
- Location of Weixin County (red) and Zhaotong City (pink) within Yunnan
- Country: People's Republic of China
- Province: Yunnan
- Prefecture-level city: Zhaotong

Area
  - Total: 1,416 km^{2} (547 sq mi)

Population (2020)
  - Total: 352,318
  - Density: 248.8/km^{2} (644.4/sq mi)
- Time zone: UTC+8 (CST)
- Postal code: 657900
- Area code: 0870
- Website: www.weixin.gov.cn

Weixin County (Chinese: 威信县; pinyin: Wēixìn Xiàn) is a county in the northeast of Yunnan Province, China, bordering Sichuan Province to the north. It is under the administration the prefecture-level city of Zhaotong.

== Administrative divisions ==
Weixin County has 7 towns, 2 townships and 1 ethnic township.

7 towns

- Zhaxi (扎西镇)
- Jiucheng (旧城镇)
- Luobu (罗布镇)
- Linfeng (麟凤镇)
- Chang'an (长安镇)
- Miaogou (庙沟镇)
- Shuitian (水田镇)

2 townships

- Gaotian (高田乡)
- Santao (三桃乡)

1 ethnic township

- Shuanghe Miao and Yi (双河苗族彝族乡)

== Gallery ==
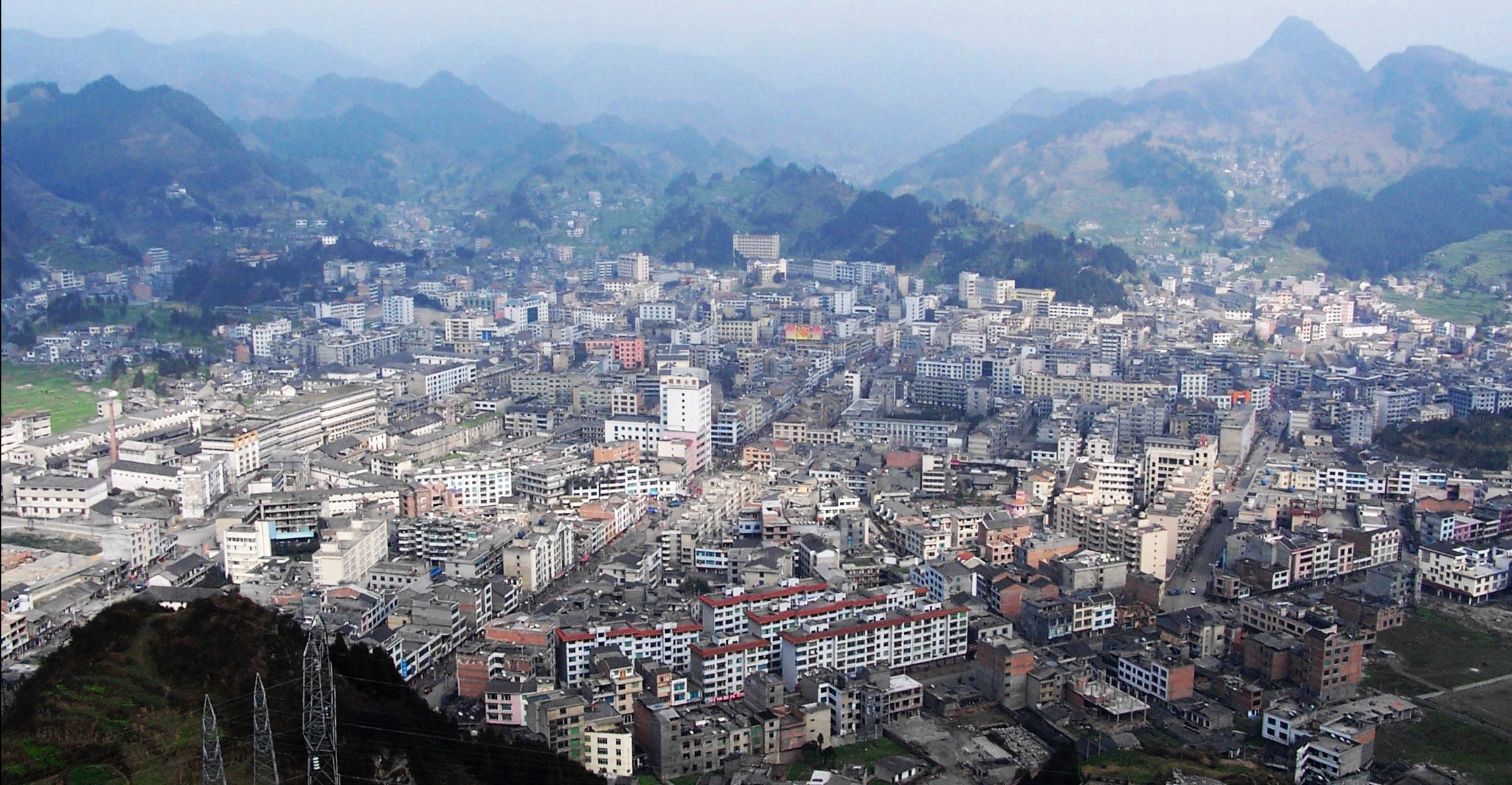
The town of Zhaxi (扎西镇), late 2007

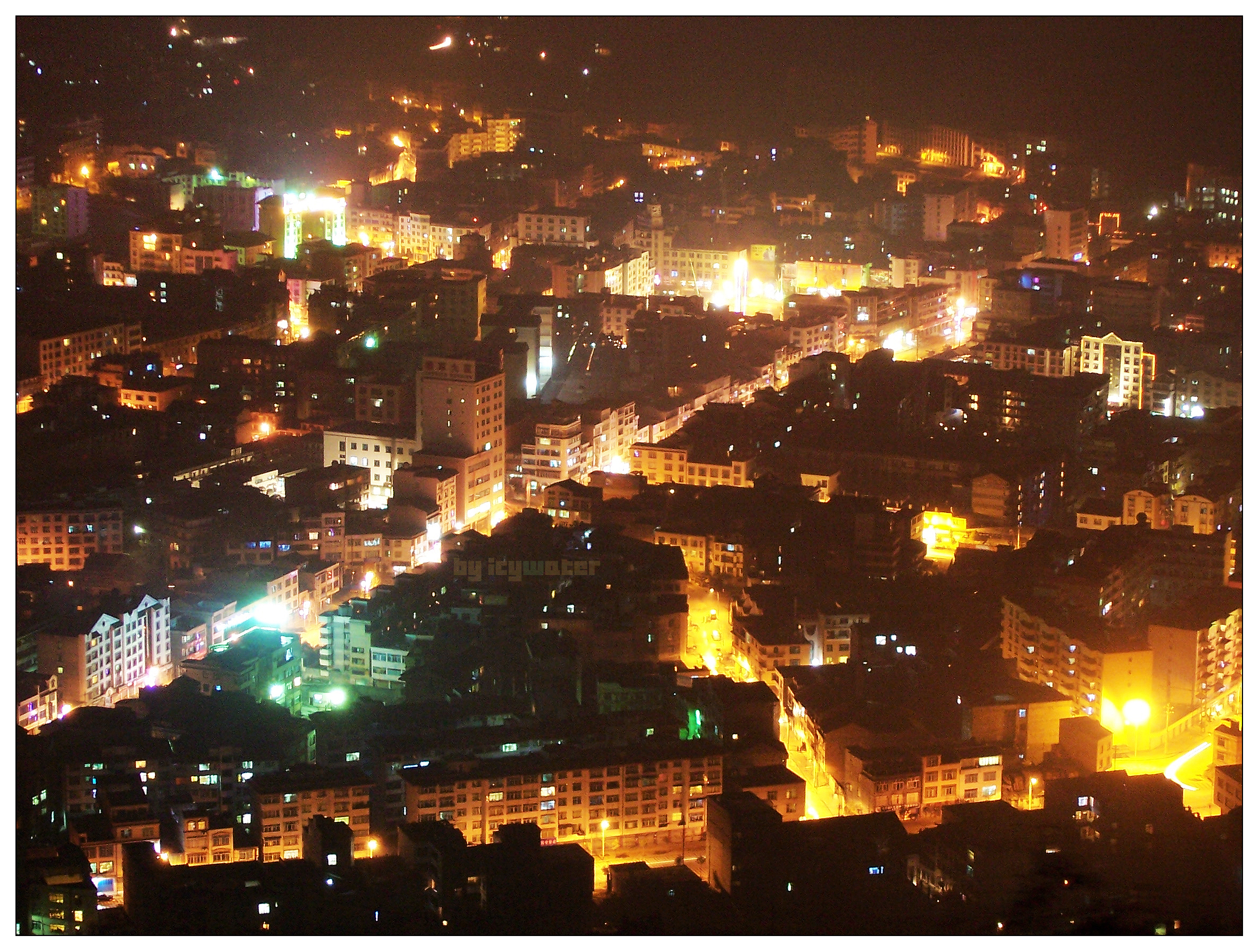
View of Zhaxi at night

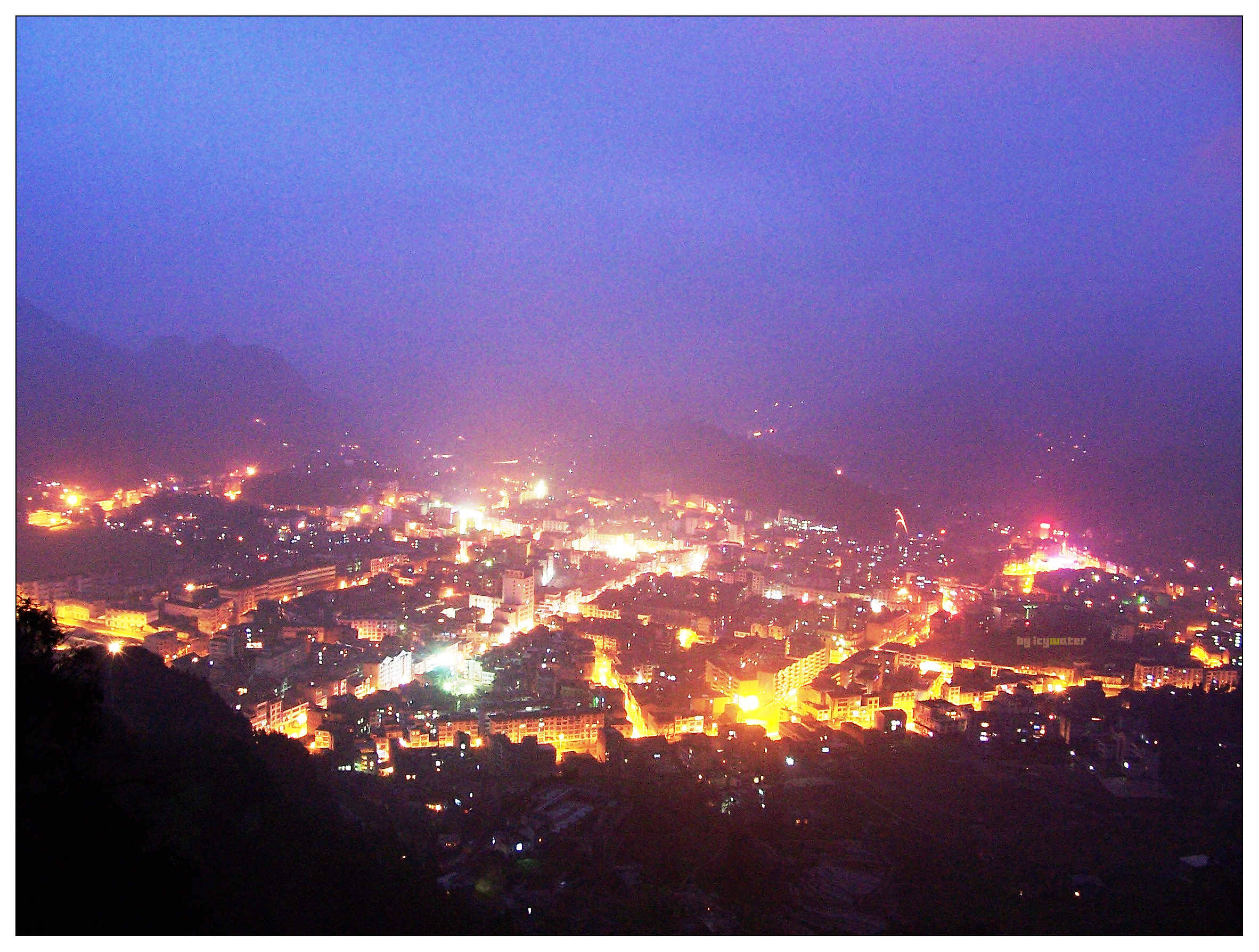
Another view of Zhaxi at night

== Climate ==
Climate data for Weixin, elevation 1,218 m (3,996 ft), (1991–2020 normals, extremes 1981–2010)
Month	Jan	Feb	Mar	Apr	May	Jun	Jul	Aug	Sep	Oct	Nov	Dec	Year
Record high °C (°F)	20.3 (68.5)	31.9 (89.4)	33.4 (92.1)	33.0 (91.4)	34.5 (94.1)	35.2 (95.4)	35.8 (96.4)	35.8 (96.4)	37.2 (99.0)	32.4 (90.3)	28.9 (84.0)	23.5 (74.3)	37.2 (99.0)
Mean daily maximum °C (°F)	6.6 (43.9)	9.5 (49.1)	14.3 (57.7)	19.7 (67.5)	23.0 (73.4)	25.0 (77.0)	28.3 (82.9)	28.1 (82.6)	23.9 (75.0)	17.8 (64.0)	13.9 (57.0)	8.2 (46.8)	18.2 (64.7)
Daily mean °C (°F)	3.7 (38.7)	6.0 (42.8)	9.9 (49.8)	14.7 (58.5)	17.9 (64.2)	20.4 (68.7)	23.0 (73.4)	22.6 (72.7)	19.2 (66.6)	14.4 (57.9)	10.2 (50.4)	5.2 (41.4)	13.9 (57.1)
Mean daily minimum °C (°F)	2.0 (35.6)	3.8 (38.8)	7.1 (44.8)	11.3 (52.3)	14.4 (57.9)	17.4 (63.3)	19.5 (67.1)	19.0 (66.2)	16.2 (61.2)	12.4 (54.3)	8.0 (46.4)	3.4 (38.1)	11.2 (52.2)
Record low °C (°F)	−5.3 (22.5)	−4.1 (24.6)	−3.5 (25.7)	2.3 (36.1)	6.1 (43.0)	10.5 (50.9)	11.5 (52.7)	11.4 (52.5)	7.3 (45.1)	0.8 (33.4)	−2.0 (28.4)	−9.8 (14.4)	−9.8 (14.4)
Average precipitation mm (inches)	25.5 (1.00)	26.2 (1.03)	47.3 (1.86)	74.9 (2.95)	105.8 (4.17)	156.8 (6.17)	185.2 (7.29)	163.0 (6.42)	107.1 (4.22)	74.8 (2.94)	33.5 (1.32)	27.1 (1.07)	1,027.2 (40.44)
Average precipitation days (≥ 0.1 mm)	20.8	18.0	18.8	17.7	17.8	19.4	18.3	16.5	15.6	19.6	15.8	19.5	217.8
Average snowy days	7.7	4.4	0.9	0	0	0	0	0	0	0	0.6	3.3	16.9
Average relative humidity (%)	86	84	82	80	80	83	81	81	83	87	86	86	83
Mean monthly sunshine hours	32.6	43.1	71.7	103.9	109.1	91.6	151.9	157.0	98.7	48.3	55.1	36.9	999.9
Percentage possible sunshine	10	14	19	27	26	22	36	39	27	14	17	12	22
Source: China Meteorological Administration
