= Zhaotong =

Zhaotong 昭通市 Chaotung
- Prefecture-level city
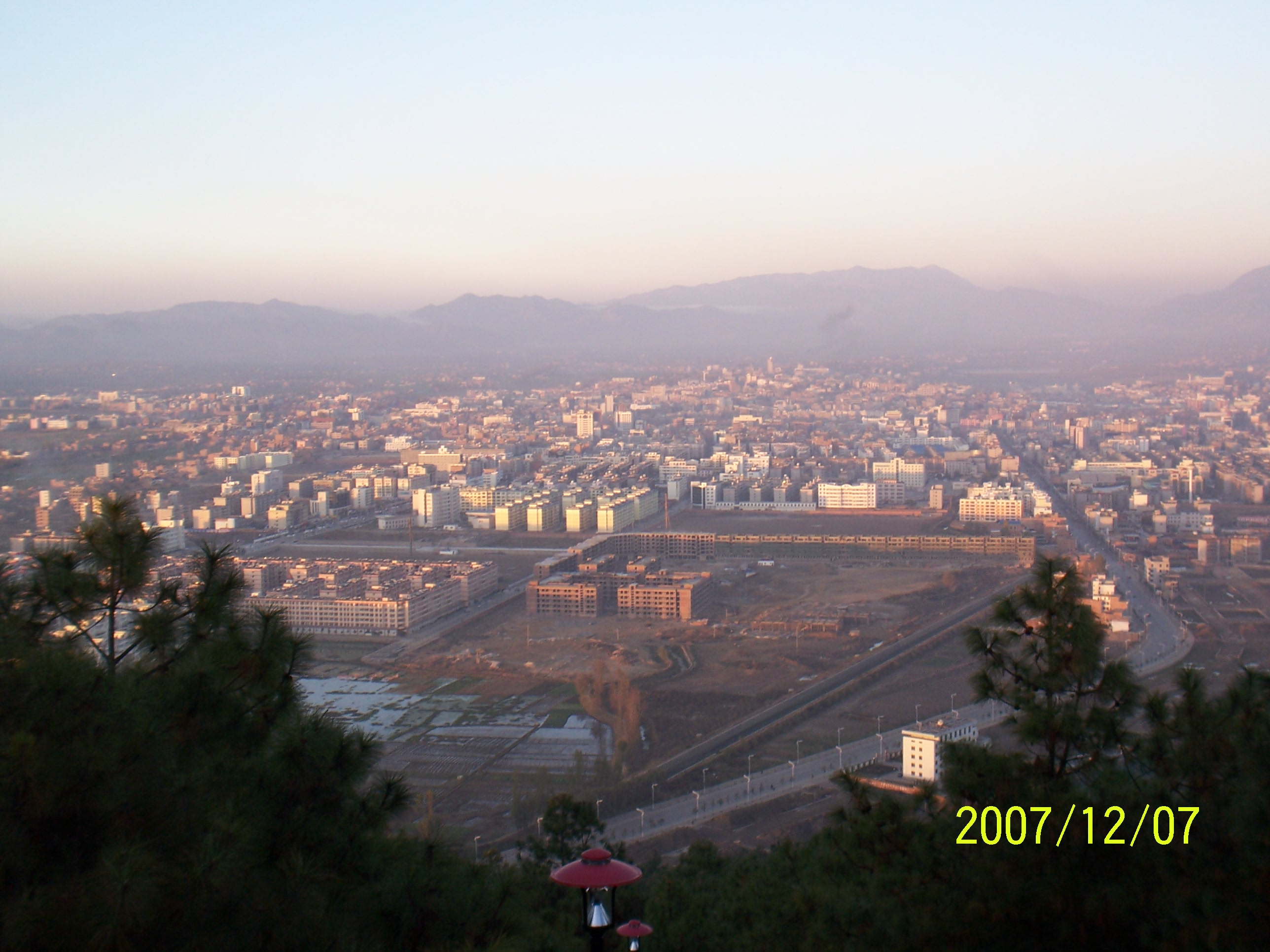

- Location of Zhaotong in Yunnan
- Coordinates (Zhaotong municipal government): 27°20′17″N 103°43′01″E
- Country: People's Republic of China
- Province: Yunnan
- GB/T 2260: 530600
- Prefecture seat: Zhaoyang District

Area
  - Prefecture-level city: 23,192 km^{2} (8,954 sq mi)
- Elevation: 1,926 m (6,319 ft)

Population (2010 census)
  - Prefecture-level city: 5,213,533
  - Density: 224.80/km^{2} (582.23/sq mi)
  - Urban: 352,831

GDP
  - Prefecture-level city: CN¥ 154.1 billion US$ 22.7 billion
  - Per capita: CN¥ 30,935; US$ 4,563
- Time zone: UTC+8 (China Standard)
- Postal code: 657000
- Area code: 0870
- ISO 3166 code: CN-YN-06
- License plate prefixes: 云C

Zhaotong
- Chinese: 昭通
- Postal: Chaotung
Transcriptions
Standard Mandarin
- Hanyu Pinyin: Zhāotōng
- Gwoyeu Romatzyh: Jautong
- Wade–Giles: Chao^{1}-t‘ung^{1}

Zhaotong (Chinese: 昭通) is a prefecture-level city located in the northeast corner of Yunnan province, China, bordering the provinces of Guizhou to the south and southeast and Sichuan to the northeast, north, and west. By the end of 2024, the resident population of the city was 4.804 million.

== History ==
Zhaotong has historic and cultural links to the Shu (Sichuan Basin) region. Yi people consider Zhaotong to be their homeland (called Zizipuwu). Zhaotong was part of Zhuti County (朱提縣) from the Han to Tang dynasties. Zhaotong belonged to the Nanzhao then Dali Kingdom until the Mongols destroyed the latter in the 13th century. During the Yuan Dynasty, it became the Wumeng Commandery (乌蒙路), during which time many Hui Muslims settled in the area. During the Qing dynasty, local tusi chieftains were removed, and the region was renamed Zhaotong Prefecture.

== Climate ==
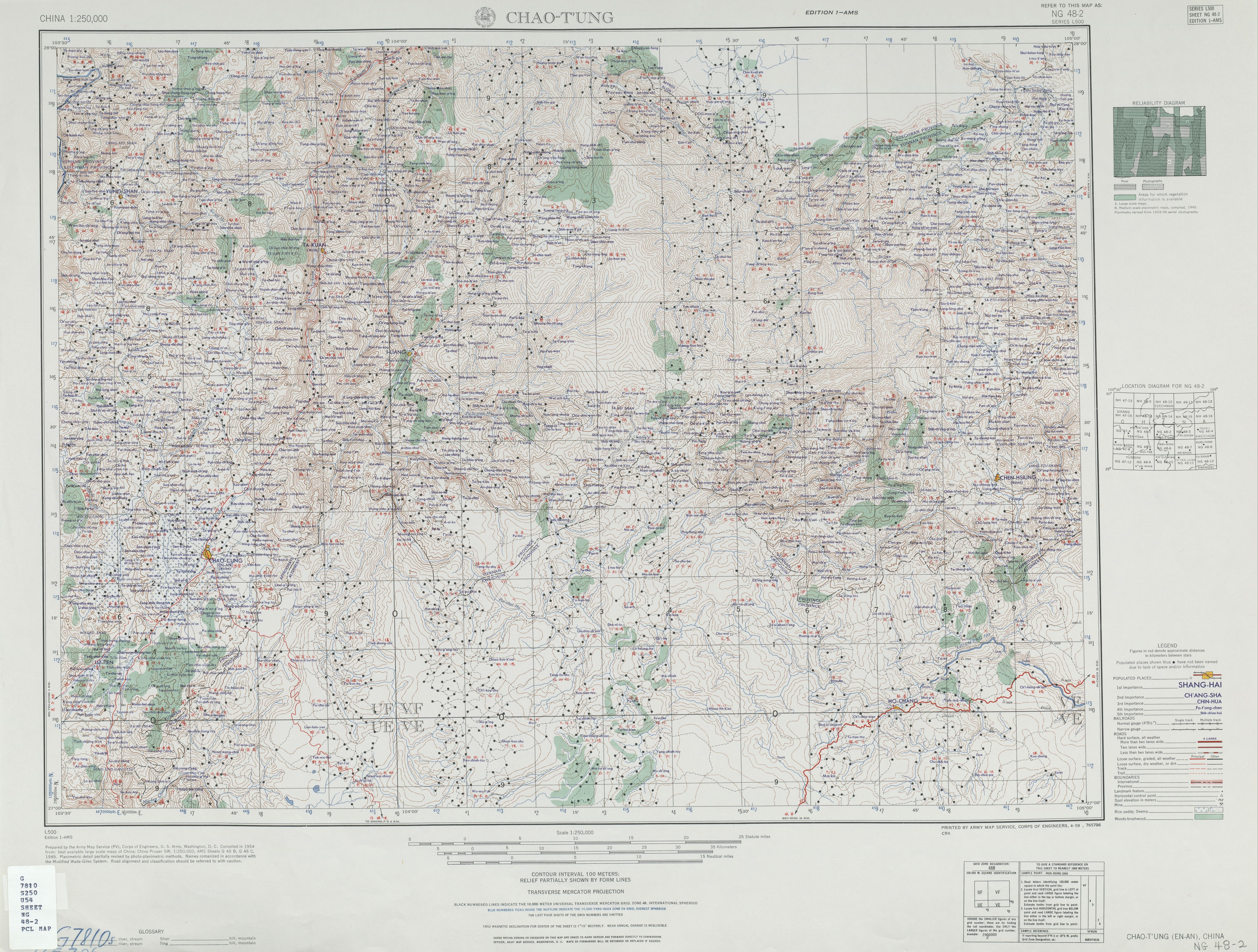
Zhaotong (labeled as CHAO-T'UNG (EN-AN) 昭通 (恩安)) (1954)

Influenced by the low latitude and moderate elevation, Zhaotong has a temperate subtropical highland climate (Köppen Cwb), with cool, dry winters, and warm, humid summers. Temperatures frequently drop below freezing at night in winter, though the days warm up to around 10 °C (50 °F). Conversely, in summer, average highs rise to 25 °C (77 °F). A great majority of the year's rainfall occurs from May to September.

Climate data for Zhaotong, elevation 1,950 m (6,400 ft), (1991–2020 normals, extremes 1981–2020)
Month	Jan	Feb	Mar	Apr	May	Jun	Jul	Aug	Sep	Oct	Nov	Dec	Year
Record high °C (°F)	24.7 (76.5)	27.0 (80.6)	30.3 (86.5)	31.6 (88.9)	33.6 (92.5)	33.5 (92.3)	32.7 (90.9)	32.0 (89.6)	33.3 (91.9)	28.5 (83.3)	25.4 (77.7)	23.2 (73.8)	33.6 (92.5)
Mean daily maximum °C (°F)	10.1 (50.2)	13.1 (55.6)	17.5 (63.5)	21.1 (70.0)	23.1 (73.6)	24.0 (75.2)	25.5 (77.9)	25.3 (77.5)	22.4 (72.3)	17.7 (63.9)	15.3 (59.5)	10.5 (50.9)	18.8 (65.8)
Daily mean °C (°F)	2.6 (36.7)	5.3 (41.5)	9.1 (48.4)	13.4 (56.1)	16.3 (61.3)	18.3 (64.9)	20.0 (68.0)	19.5 (67.1)	16.8 (62.2)	12.3 (54.1)	8.5 (47.3)	3.7 (38.7)	12.1 (53.9)
Mean daily minimum °C (°F)	−1.4 (29.5)	0.8 (33.4)	4.2 (39.6)	8.7 (47.7)	12.0 (53.6)	14.8 (58.6)	16.3 (61.3)	15.8 (60.4)	13.3 (55.9)	9.4 (48.9)	4.6 (40.3)	0.1 (32.2)	8.2 (46.8)
Record low °C (°F)	−9.1 (15.6)	−8.7 (16.3)	−6.9 (19.6)	−2.7 (27.1)	−0.1 (31.8)	5.8 (42.4)	7.5 (45.5)	7.0 (44.6)	3.6 (38.5)	−0.8 (30.6)	−5.5 (22.1)	−10.4 (13.3)	−10.4 (13.3)
Average precipitation mm (inches)	8.5 (0.33)	9.6 (0.38)	16.6 (0.65)	29.3 (1.15)	57.2 (2.25)	128.3 (5.05)	153.3 (6.04)	125.2 (4.93)	77.2 (3.04)	55.1 (2.17)	12.4 (0.49)	5.3 (0.21)	678 (26.69)
Average precipitation days (≥ 0.1 mm)	5.4	5.9	7.0	9.3	12.7	17.7	17.1	16.7	15.2	14.1	5.9	4.8	131.8
Average snowy days	9.1	6.5	2.6	0.2	0	0	0	0	0	0	1.4	5.3	25.1
Average relative humidity (%)	73	68	67	66	70	77	77	77	79	81	77	76	74
Mean monthly sunshine hours	140.6	154.3	193.3	196.4	178.2	123.2	151.5	159.2	129.0	103.2	143.4	125.0	1,797.3
Percentage possible sunshine	43	49	52	51	43	30	36	40	35	29	45	39	41
Source 1: China Meteorological Administration
Source 2: Weather China

== Population ==
=== Demography ===
The prefecture, almost exclusively agricultural, is one of the poorest in China, which led the authorities to encourage young people to migrate to eastern and southern parts of China to find work. For the year 2003, the number of emigrants was 650,000.

The government wanted the number to increase by 50,000 in 2004.

=== Religion ===
It is the seat of the Latin Catholic Apostolic Prefecture of Zhaotong.

=== Language ===
The local Zhaotong dialect is a variety of Southwestern Mandarin that has been influenced to some extent by the local Yi and Miao languages. It has its own unique features while also showing characteristics of northern Chinese dialects. The dialect has four tone categories: Tone 1, Tone 2, Tone 3, and Tone 4.

=== Food ===
Potato rice (洋芋饭): Potatoes (potatoes) and rice are cooked together. It is soft, sticky and fragrant. It is a common home-cooked staple food for locals.

Chicken stewed with Gastrodia elata (天麻炖鸡): A specialty of Zhaotong, chicken stewed with Gastrodia elata has a clear and delicious soup with nourishing effects.

Zhaotong Liangfen (昭通凉粉): Dried peas are skinned, soaked in water, ground into a paste, filtered, boiled into a thick paste, and then cooled and solidified.

Fried Potato Cake with Bean Powder (油糕稀豆粉): This dish is made by combining two core elements: golden and crispy fried potato cake and fragrant and delicate pea powder.

Zhaotong Mini Meat Skewers (昭通小肉串): Zhaotong mini meat skewers are a highly representative specialty barbecue dish from Zhaotong City, Yunnan Province, and are hailed as "a unique Yunnan barbecue delicacy."

== Economy ==
The main industries in the prefecture are mining, tobacco and cement manufacturing

Zhaotong has some of the largest lignite sources in China. The 18,000-capacity Yuanbaoshan Stadium is also located in the city. It hosts many events, for example athletic events such as soccer matches.

=== Transport ===
- Zhaotong Airport (ZAT), flight destination to Kunming, Chengdu, Chongqing, Beijing, Guiyang
- Train service to Kunming, Chengdu, Guangzhou
- Zhaotong is connected to the Chongqing-Kunming National Highway network.
- China National Highway 213
- G85 Yinchuan–Kunming Expressway

Zhaotong has several bridges over the Jinsha River, an upstream section of the Yangtze.

== Administrative divisions ==
Map
Name	Chinese	Hanyu Pinyin	Population (2010)	Area (km^{2})	Density (/km^{2})
Zhaoyang District	昭阳区	Zhāoyáng Qū	787,845	2,240	352
Shuifu city	水富市	Shuǐfù Shì	102,143	319	320
Ludian County	鲁甸县	Lǔdiàn Xiàn	390,654	1,519	257
Qiaojia County	巧家县	Qiǎojiā Xiàn	516,349	3,245	159
Yanjin County	盐津县	Yánjīn Xiàn	369,881	2,096	176
Daguan County	大关县	Dàguān Xiàn	263,225	1,802	146
Yongshan County	永善县	Yǒngshàn Xiàn	394,267	2,833	139
Suijiang County	绥江县	Suíjiāng Xiàn	153,091	882	174
Zhenxiong County	镇雄县	Zhènxióng Xiàn	1,328,375	3,785	351
Yiliang County	彝良县	Yíliáng Xiàn	521,838	2,884	181
Weixin County	威信县	Wēixìn Xiàn	385,865	1,416	273

=== Ethnicity ===
Among the resident population, the Han population is 4,683,478, accounting for 89.83% of the total population; the ethnic minorities population is 530,055, accounting for 10.17% of the total population.

Zhaotong Ethnic Composition (November 2010)
	Han	Hui	Miao	Yi	Bai	Zhuang	Buyi	Sui	Hani	Dai	Others
Population	4683470	180962	172620	161527	6467	2943	2354	461	447	412	1858
Proportion of total population (%)	89.83	3.47	3.31	3.10	0.12	0.06	0.05	0.01	0.01	0.01	
Proportion of minority population (%)	---	34.14	32.57	30.47	1.22	0.56	0.44	0.09	0.08	0.08	0.35

== See also ==
- Xiangjiaba Dam
- Xiluodu Dam
