= Cao Xian (Cao Wei) =

Chinese noble consort of the Eastern Han dynasty

Cao Xian 曹憲
- Guiren (貴人)
- House: House of Cao
- Dynasty: Han Dynasty
- Father: Cao Cao

Cao Xian (曹憲) was a Chinese noble woman member of the aristocrat Cao family during the Three Kingdoms period at the end of the Han dynasty. She was the daughter of the warlord Cao Cao, the King of Cao Wei, and she was a noble consort of Emperor Xian. Initially, her title was Furen (夫人); in 214, her title upgraded to Guiren (貴人).

== Life ==
Cao Xian was elected to serve Emperor Xian of Han in 213 along with her two younger sisters, Cao Jie and Cao Hua. The three sisters entered the imperial court as consorts of Emperor Xian, in an attempt by Cao Cao to control the emperor. In 215, after Empress Fu Shou was assassinated for plotting against Cao Cao, he forced Emperor Xian to make Cao Jie an empress.

There are no records of Cao Xian's life as Emperor Xian's consort, but her sister Cao Jie who was made empress resisted the coup d'état orchestrated by her half-brother, Cao Pi. The coup d'état resulted in the downfall of Emperor Xian and the eventual fall of the Han dynasty in favor of stabilizing the State of Cao Wei. After the fall of the Han Dynasty, Emperor Xian was demoted to a duke and Cao Jie to a duchess.

Cao Xian's fate after the fall of the Han Dynasty is uncertain; it is likely that she returned to her family of origin after her half-brother Cao Pi established Cao Wei. She was buried in southern Bozhou.

== Family ==
=== Parents ===
- Cao Cao (曹操), courtesy name Mengde (孟德), was a renowned military tactician, politician, and poet of the late Eastern Han Dynasty. He played a pivotal role in establishing and leading to the formation Cao Wei Kingdom during the Three Kingdoms era.

=== Brothers ===
- Cao Pi (曹丕), courtesy name Zihuan (子桓), was the first Emperor of the Cao Wei dynasty during the Three Kingdoms period.
- Cao Zhang (曹彰), courtesy name Ziwu (子文), was the second son of Cao Cao and Lady Bian and the brother of Emperor Cao Pi. He was married to the daughter of Sun Ben.
- Cao Zhi (曹植), courtesy name Zijian (子建), was known as Chen Wang (陳王) and was a prominent figure in later generations' literature.
- Cao Xiong (曹熊), courtesy name Zilie (子烈), was the fourth son of Cao Cao and Lady Bian and the younger brother of Emperor Cao Pi, Cao Zhang, and Cao Zhi.
- Cao Ang (曹昂), courtesy name Zixiu (子脩), was the eldest son of Cao Cao and was raised by Lady Ding after the early death of his birth mother.
- Cao Shuo (曹鑠)
- Cao Chong (曹沖), courtesy name Cangshu (倉舒), was born to Cao Cao and Lady Huan.
- Cao Ju (曹峻)
- Cao Yu (曹宇), courtesy name Pengzu (彭祖), was the father of Wei Emperor Cao Huang.
- Cao Lin (曹林), whose courtesy name is unspecified, was born to Cao Cao and Lady Du and was given the title Prince of Pei.
- Cao Gun (曹衮), whose courtesy name is unspecified, was born to Cao Cao and Lady Du and was titled the Prince of Zhongshan.
- Cao Xuan (曹玹)
- Cao Jun (曹峻), courtesy name Zian (子安).
- Cao Ju (曹矩)
- Cao Gan (曹干)
- Cao Shang (曹上)
- Cao Biao (曹彪), courtesy name Zhuhu (朱虎).
- Cao Qin (曹勤)
- Cao Cheng (曹乘)
- Cao Zheng (曹整)
- Cao Jing (曹京)
- Cao Jun (曹均)
- Cao Ji (曹棘)
- Cao Hui (曹徽)
- Cao Mao (曹茂)

=== Sisters ===
- Princess Qinghe (清河公主), whose name is unspecified, the eldest child of Cao Cao, was the wife of Xiahou Mao.
- Cao Hua (曹憲), who became an Imperial consort during Emperor Xian's reign.
- Cao Jie (曹節), the second empress of Emperor Xian of Han.
- Princess Jinxiang (金鄉公主), whose name is unspecified, was the wife of He Yan.
- Princess Anyang (安陽公主), whose name is unspecified, was married to Xun Yun.
- Princess Linfen (臨汾公主)

== Sources ==
- Chen, Shou (3rd century). Records of the Three Kingdoms (Sanguozhi).
- Fan, Ye (5th century). Book of the Later Han (Houhanshu).
