= Cao Hua =

Chinese noble consort of the Eastern Han dynasty

Cao Hua 曹華
- Guiren (貴人)
- Born: c.late 200s
- Died: ?
- House: House of Cao
- Dynasty: Han Dynasty
- Father: Cao Cao
- Mother: unknown

Cao Hua (曹華; born c.late 200s) was a Chinese noble woman member of the aristocrat Cao family during the Three Kingdoms period at the end of the Han dynasty. She was a daughter of the warlord Cao Cao, the King of Cao Wei (then a vassal state under the Eastern Han). She was a noble consort of Emperor Xian. Initially, her title was Furen (夫人); in 214, her title upgraded to Guiren (貴人).

== Life ==
Cao Hua was elected to serve Emperor Xian of Han in 213 along with her two elder sisters, Cao Jie and Cao Xian. The three sisters entered the imperial court as consorts of Emperor Xian, in an attempt by Cao Cao to control the emperor. Cao Hua was young at the time, so she entered the imperial court later than the other two sisters. In 215, after Empress Fu Shou was assassinated for plotting against Cao Cao, he forced Emperor Xian to make Cao Jie an empress.

There are no records of Cao Hua's life as Emperor Xian's consort, but her sister Cao Jie, who became empress, resisted the coup d'état orchestrated by her half-brother, Cao Pi. The coup d'état resulted in the downfall of Emperor Xian and the eventual fall of the Han dynasty in favor of stabilization of the Cao Wei state. After the fall of the Han dynasty, Emperor Xian was demoted to a duke and Cao Jie to a duchess.

Cao Hua's fate after the fall of the Han Dynasty is unknown.

== Family ==
=== Parents ===
- Cao Cao (曹操), courtesy name Mengde (孟德), was a renowned military tactician, politician, and poet of the late Eastern Han Dynasty. He played a pivotal role in establishing and leading to the formation of the kingdom of Cao Wei during the Three Kingdoms era.
- Lady Bian (卞氏), was the wife of Cao Cao, after her son, Cao Pi, became emperor, she was given the title of Empress Dowager.

=== Brothers ===
- Cao Pi (曹丕), courtesy name Zihuan (子桓), was the first Emperor of the Cao Wei dynasty during the Three Kingdoms period.
- Cao Zhang (曹彰), courtesy name Ziwu (子文), was the second son of Cao Cao and Lady Bian and the brother of Emperor Cao Pi. He was married to the daughter of Sun Ben.
- Cao Zhi (曹植), courtesy name Zijian (子建), was known as Chen Wang (陳王) and was a prominent figure in later generations' literature.
- Cao Xiong (曹熊), courtesy name Zilie (子烈), was the fourth son of Cao Cao and Lady Bian and the younger brother of Emperor Cao Pi, Cao Zhang, and Cao Zhi.
- Cao Ang (曹昂), courtesy name Zixiu (子脩), was the eldest son of Cao Cao and was raised by Lady Ding after the early death of his birth mother.
- Cao Shuo (曹鑠)
- Cao Chong (曹沖), courtesy name Cangshu (倉舒), was born to Cao Cao and Lady Huan.
- Cao Ju (曹峻)
- Cao Yu (曹宇), courtesy name Pengzu (彭祖), was the father of Wei Emperor Cao Huang.
- Cao Lin (曹林), whose courtesy name is unspecified, was born to Cao Cao and Lady Du and was given the title Prince of Pei.
- Cao Gun (曹衮), whose courtesy name is unspecified, was born to Cao Cao and Lady Du and was titled the Prince of Zhongshan.
- Cao Xuan (曹玹)
- Cao Jun (曹峻), courtesy name Zian (子安).
- Cao Ju (曹矩)
- Cao Gan (曹干)
- Cao Shang (曹上)
- Cao Biao (曹彪), courtesy name Zhuhu (朱虎).
- Cao Qin (曹勤)
- Cao Cheng (曹乘)
- Cao Zheng (曹整)
- Cao Jing (曹京)
- Cao Jun (曹均)
- Cao Ji (曹棘)
- Cao Hui (曹徽)
- Cao Mao (曹茂)

=== Sisters ===
- Princess Qinghe (清河公主), whose name is unspecified, the eldest child of Cao Cao, was the wife of Xiahou Mao.
- Cao Xian (曹憲), who became an Imperial consort during Emperor Xian's reign.
- Cao Jie (曹節), the second empress of Emperor Xian of Han.
- Princess Jinxiang (金鄉公主), whose name is unspecified, was the wife of He Yan.
- Princess Anyang (安陽公主), whose name is unspecified, was married to Xun Yun.
- Princess Linfen (臨汾公主)

== Sources ==
- Chen, Shou (3rd century). Records of the Three Kingdoms (Sanguozhi). Book of Wei, Biography of Emperor Wu"
- Fan, Ye (5th century). Book of the Later Han (Houhanshu).
- "Book of the Later Han: Record of Empresses, Volume II"
