= Cao Wei family trees =

This article contains the family trees of members of the Cao clan, who ruled the state of Cao Wei (220– February 266) in the Three Kingdoms period (220–280) in China. Only Cao Cao's lineage is shown in this article. The lineages of his relatives, such as Cao Ren, Cao Zhen and others, are not included here.

== Cao Song ==
Cao Meng^{1} 曹萌; Yuanwei 元偉
Cao Teng^{2} 曹騰; Jixing 季興
Cao Song 曹嵩; Jugao 巨高
Xiahou Yuan 夏侯淵; Miaocai 妙才	Marquis Ai of Haiyang 海陽哀侯 (name unknown)	Cao Bin 曹彬	Cao Cao 曹操; Mengde 孟德	Cao De^{3} 曹德	Cao Yu^{6} 曹玉	Son (name unknown)	Son^{4} (name unknown)	Sun Jian 孫堅; Wentai 文台
Xiahou Heng 夏侯衡; Boshu 伯叔	Daughter (name unknown)	Cao Jun^{5} 曹均	Cao Hui^{7} 曹徽	Cao Anmin^{6} 曹安民	Daughter (name unknown)	Sun Kuang 孫匡; Jizuo 季佐

Cao Song was a foster son of the eunuch Cao Teng and he had at least four sons: Cao Cao, Cao Bin, Cao De, and a fourth one whose personal name was not recorded and was only known by his posthumous title "Marquis Ai of Haiyang". The marquis's daughter married Xiahou Yuan's eldest son Xiahou Heng.

- ^{1} The name of Cao Teng's father was given as either "Cao Meng" (曹萌) or "Cao Jie" (曹節) in various commentated versions of the Houhanshu. Since Cao Jie is also the name of Cao Cao's daughter, Rafe de Crespigny considers the name Cao Jie unlikely to be that of Cao Teng's father due to the naming taboo against using an ancestor's name.
- ^{2} Cao Teng was a eunuch. He adopted Cao Song as his foster son. See Cao Song#Family background for information on Cao Song's heritage.
- ^{3} Cao De's name was recorded as "Cao Ji" (曹疾) in the Houhanshu.
- ^{4} The Sanguozhi mentioned that Sun Kuang married the daughter of Cao Cao's younger brother, whose name was not recorded. It might be possible that this younger brother of Cao Cao was the same person as either of Cao Cao's three other younger brothers.
- ^{5} Cao Jun was actually Cao Cao's son. He was adopted by his uncle Cao Bin because the latter had no heir.
- ^{6} Cao Cao had a nephew, Cao Anmin, who was killed at the Battle of Wancheng in 197. Cao Anmin was stated to be a son of Cao Cao's younger brother, whose name was not recorded. It might be possible that this younger brother of Cao Cao was the same person as either of Cao Cao's three other younger brothers.
- ^{7} Cao Yu (曹玉), also known by his posthumous title "Marquis Ai of Langling" (朗陵哀侯), was mentioned in the Sanguozhi as a granduncle of Cao Cao's son Cao Hui, whom he adopted as his heir. However, this is likely to be an error since there is no record of Cao Song having any brothers; therefore, Cao Yu was most probably an uncle of Cao Hui.
- ^{8} Cao Hui was actually Cao Cao's son. He was adopted by his (grand)uncle Cao Yu because the latter had no heir.

== Cao Cao, his wives, and his children ==
=== Lady Bian ===
Cao Cao 曹操; Mengde 孟德	Lady Bian 卞氏
Cao Pi 曹丕; Zihuan 子桓	Cao Zhang 曹彰; Ziwen 子文	Cao Zhi 曹植; Zijian 子建	Cao Xiong 曹熊
Cao Bing 曹炳

Cao Cao and Lady Bian had four sons: Cao Pi, Cao Zhang, Cao Zhi and Cao Xiong.

Cao Xiong was succeeded by his son Cao Bing. Cao Bing had no heir.

==== Cao Zhang ====
Sun Ben 孫賁; Boyang 伯陽
Cao Zhang 曹彰; Ziwen 子文	Lady Sun 孫氏
Cao Kai 曹楷	Daughter (name unknown)	Wang Chang 王昌; Gongbo 公伯

Cao Zhang married Sun Ben's daughter (personal name unknown). Cao Zhang's son was Cao Kai. Cao Zhang also had a daughter (personal name unknown) who married Wang Chang. It is not known whether Cao Zhang's two children were born to Lady Sun (Sun Ben's daughter) or not.

* Note that Cao Zhang's name was erroneously recorded as 曹章 in Sun Ce's biography in the Sanguozhi.

==== Cao Zhi ====
Cui Yan 崔琰; Jigui 季珪	Cui Yan's brother
Cao Zhi 曹植; Zijian 子建	Lady Cui 崔氏
Cao Miao 曹苗	Cao Zhi 曹志; Yungong 允恭	Cao Jinhu 曹金瓠	Cao Xingnü 曹行女

Cao Zhi married the daughter of Cui Yan's elder brother. He had two sons — Cao Miao and Cao Zhi (courtesy name "Yungong"). He also had two daughters — Cao Jinhu and Cao Xingnü. It is not known whether Cao Zhi's three children were born to Lady Cui or not; Cao Zhi was recorded to be a son of a concubine.

=== Lady Liu ===
Cao Cao 曹操; Mengde 孟德	Lady Liu 劉氏
Cao Ang 曹昂; Zixiu 子脩	Cao Shuo 曹鑠	Princess Qinghe 清河公主 (name unknown)
Cao Wan^{1} 曹琬	Cao Song^{2} 曹竦
Cao Lian 曹廉

Xiahou Dun 夏侯惇; Yuanrang 元讓
Xiahou Mao 夏侯楙; Zilin 子林

Cao Cao and Lady Liu had two sons and a daughter: Cao Ang, Cao Shuo and Princess Qinghe (personal name unknown). Princess Qinghe married Xiahou Dun's son Xiahou Mao.

Cao Ang's successor was Cao Wan, a son of his half-brother Cao Jun (曹均). Cao Wan's son was Cao Lian. Cao Shuo's successor was Cao Song, a son of his half-brother Cao Mao (曹茂).

- ^{1} Cao Wan was actually a son of Cao Ang's half-brother Cao Jun. Cao Ang died without an heir so Cao Wan was chosen to be his successor.
- ^{2} Cao Song was actually a son of Cao Shuo's half-brother Cao Mao. Cao Shuo died without an heir so Cao Song was chosen to be his successor.

=== Lady Huan ===
Lady Huan 環氏	Cao Cao 曹操; Mengde 孟德	Lady Bian 卞氏
Cao Chong 曹沖; Cangshu 倉舒	Cao Ju 曹據	Cao Yu 曹宇; Pengzu 彭祖
Cao Cong^{1} 曹琮	Cao Huan 曹奐; Jingming 景明

Bian Bing 卞秉
Bian Lin 卞琳
Empress Bian 卞皇后

Cao Cao and Lady Huan had three sons: Cao Chong, Cao Ju and Cao Yu.

Cao Chong's successor was Cao Cong, a son of his brother Cao Ju. Cao Yu's son was Cao Huan. Cao Huan married Bian Lin's daughter Empress Bian. Bian Lin was a son of Bian Bing, a younger brother of Lady Bian (another of Cao Cao's wives).

- ^{1} Cao Cong was actually a son of Cao Chong's brother Cao Ju. Cao Chong died without an heir so Cao Cong was chosen to be his successor.

=== Lady Du ===
Cao Cao 曹操; Mengde 孟德	Lady Du 杜氏	Qin Yilu 秦宜祿
Cao Gun 曹袞	Cao Lin 曹林	Qin Lang 秦朗; Yuanming 元明
Cao Fu 曹孚	Cao Wei 曹緯	Daughter (name unknown)	Ji Kang 嵇康; Shuye 叔夜

Cao Cao and Lady Du had two sons: Cao Lin and Cao Gun. Lady Du and her ex-husband Qin Yilu had a son, Qin Lang, who was adopted by Cao Cao after his mother's remarriage.

Cao Gun's son was Cao Fu. Cao Lin had a son (Cao Wei) and a daughter (personal name unknown). The daughter married Ji Kang.

=== Lady Qin ===
Cao Cao 曹操; Mengde 孟德	Lady Qin 秦氏
Cao Jun 曹峻; Zi'an 子安	Cao Xuan 曹玹
Cao Ao 曹澳	Cao Zan^{1} 曹贊	Cao Yi^{2} 曹壹
Cao Heng 曹恒

Cao Cao and Lady Qin had two sons: Cao Xuan and Cao Jun.

Cao Xuan's successor was Cao Zan, a son of his half-brother Cao Lin. Cao Zan's successor was his younger brother Cao Yi. Cao Yi's son was Cao Heng.

Cao Jun's son was Cao Ao.

- ^{1} Cao Zan was actually a son of Cao Xuan's half-brother Cao Lin. Cao Xuan died without an heir so Cao Zan was chosen to be his successor.
- ^{2} Cao Zan also died without an heir so his younger brother Cao Yi was chosen to be his successor. Cao Yi was hence the successor to Cao Xuan's line.

=== Lady Yin ===
He Jin 何進; Suigao 遂高
Cao Cao 曹操; Mengde 孟德	Lady Yin 尹氏	He Xian 何咸
Cao Ju 曹矩
Cao Min^{1} 曹敏
Cao Kun 曹焜
Princess Jinxiang^{2} 金鄉公主 (name unknown)	He Yan 何晏; Pingshu 平叔

Cao Cao and Lady Yin had a son: Cao Ju. Lady Yin and her ex-husband He Xian, a son of He Jin, had a son, He Yan, who was adopted by Cao Cao after his mother's remarriage. He Yan married Cao Cao's daughter Princess Jinxiang (personal name unknown).

Cao Ju's successor was Cao Min, a son of his half-brother Cao Jun (曹均). Cao Min's son was Cao Kun.

- ^{1} Cao Min was actually a son of Cao Ju's half-brother Cao Jun. Cao Ju died without an heir so Cao Min was chosen to be his successor.
- ^{2} The identity of Princess Jinxiang's mother is not confirmed. The Wei Mo Zhuan (魏末傳) claimed that Princess Jinxiang was He Yan's half-sister and that she was born to the same mother as the Prince of Pei (Cao Lin). Pei Songzhi pointed out that the Sanguozhi stated that Cao Lin's mother was Lady Du. He Yan's mother was Lady Yin. Therefore, if Princess Jinxiang shared the same mother as Cao Lin, she could not have been He Yan's half-sister.

=== Consort Sun ===
Cao Cao 曹操; Mengde 孟德	Consort Sun 孫姬
Cao Biao 曹彪; Zhuhu 朱虎	Cao Zishang 曹子上	Cao Ziqin 曹子勤
Cao Jia 曹嘉

Cao Cao and Consort Sun had three sons: Cao Zishang, Cao Ziqin and Cao Biao.

Both Cao Zishang and Cao Ziqin died without heirs. Cao Biao was succeeded by his son Cao Jia.

=== Consort Li ===
Cao Cao 曹操; Mengde 孟德	Consort Li 李姬
Cao Zizheng 曹子整	Cao Zicheng 曹子乘	Cao Zijing 曹子京
Cao Fan^{1} 曹範	Cao Chan^{2} 曹闡

Cao Cao and Consort Li had three sons: Cao Zicheng, Cao Zizheng and Cao Zijing.

Both Cao Zicheng and Cao Zijing died without heirs. Cao Zizheng's successor was Cao Fan, a son of his half-brother Cao Ju (曹據). Cao Fan was succeeded by his younger brother Cao Chan.

- ^{1} Cao Fan was actually a son of Cao Zizheng's half-brother Cao Ju. Cao Zizheng died without an heir so Cao Fan was chosen to be his successor.
- ^{2} Cao Fan also died without an heir so his younger brother Cao Chan was chosen to be his successor. Cao Chan was hence the successor to Cao Zizheng's line.

=== Cao Cao's other wives and children ===
Lady Wang 王昭儀
Lady Ding 丁氏	Cao Cao 曹操; Mengde 孟德	Xun Yu 荀彧; Wenruo 文若
Consort Zhou 周姬	Consort Song 宋姬	Consort Liu 劉姬	Consort Zhao 趙姬	Lady Chen 陳妾	Princess Anyang 安陽公主 (name unknown)	Xun Yun 荀惲
Cao Jun 曹均	Cao Hui 曹徽	Cao Ziji 曹子棘	Cao Mao 曹茂	Cao Gan 曹幹
Cao Kang 曹抗	Cao Xi 曹翕
Cao Chen 曹諶	Cao Kun 曹琨
Liu Xie 劉協; Bohe 伯和	Cao Xian 曹憲	Cao Jie 曹節	Cao Hua 曹華

Cao Cao had five other sons who were born to five different mothers: Consort Zhou bore Cao Jun; Consort Liu bore Cao Ziji; Consort Song bore Cao Hui; Consort Zhao bore Cao Mao; Lady Chen bore Cao Gan. Cao Cao also had two other wives: Lady Wang, who raised Cao Gan after Lady Chen's death; Lady Ding, who raised Cao Ang after the death of Lady Liu (Cao Ang's biological mother). Cao Cao also had four daughters whose mothers were not known: Cao Xian, Cao Jie, Cao Hua and Princess Anyang (personal name unknown). Cao Xian, Cao Jie and Cao Hua married Liu Xie (Emperor Xian of Han) while Princess Anyang married Xun Yu's son Xun Yun.

Cao Ziji died without an heir. Cao Jun was succeeded by his son Cao Kang, who in turn was succeeded by his son Cao Chen. Cao Hui was succeeded by his son Cao Xi. Cao Xi's son was Cao Kun.

== Cao Pi, his wives, and his children ==
=== Lady Zhen ===
Cao Pi 曹丕; Zihuan 子桓	Lady Zhen 甄氏
Cao Rui 曹叡; Yuanzhong 元仲	Princess Dongxiang 東鄉公主 (name unknown)

Cao Pi and Lady Zhen had a son and a daughter: Cao Rui and Princess Dongxiang (personal name unknown).

=== Consort Xu ===
Cao Pi 曹丕; Zihuan 子桓
Cao Li 曹禮
Cao Ti^{1} 曹悌

Consort Xu 徐姬

Cao Pi and Consort Xu had a son: Cao Li. Cao Li's successor was Cao Ti, a son of his cousin Cao Kai (Cao Zhang's son).

- ^{1} Cao Ti was actually a son of Cao Li's cousin Cao Kai (Cao Zhang's son). Cao Li died without an heir so Cao Ti was chosen to be his successor.

=== Ladies Pan, Zhu, and Qiu ===
Cao Cao 曹操; Mengde 孟德	Lady Bian 卞氏	Bian Bing 卞秉
Cao Pi 曹丕; Zihuan 子桓	Bian Lan 卞蘭
Lady Pan 潘淑媛	Lady Zhu 朱淑媛	Lady Qiu 仇昭儀
Bian Long 卞隆
Cao Rui 曹蕤	Cao Jian 曹鑒	Cao Lin 曹霖
Cao Zan^{1} 曹贊	Cao Qi 曹啟	Cao Mao 曹髦; Yanshi 彥士	Empress Bian 卞皇后

Three of Cao Pi's wives: Lady Pan, Lady Zhu and Lady Qiu - bore him children as such: Lady Pan bore Cao Rui; Lady Zhu bore Cao Jian; Lady Qiu bore Cao Lin.

Cao Rui's successor was Cao Zan, a son of Cao Min, Cao Ju's heir and Prince of Langya. Cao Jian had no heir. Cao Lin had two sons: Cao Qi and Cao Mao. Cao Mao married Empress Bian, Bian Long's daughter. Bian Long was Bian Lan's son, Bian Lan was Bian Bing's son. Bian Bing was a younger brother of Cao Pi's mother Lady Bian.

- ^{1} Cao Zan was actually a son of Cao Min. Cao Rui died without an heir so Cao Zan was chosen to be his successor.

=== Consorts Li, Su, Zhang, and Song ===
Cao Pi 曹丕; Zihuan 子桓
Consort Li 李貴人	Consort Su 蘇姬	Consort Zhang 張姬	Consort Song 宋姬
Cao Xie 曹協	Cao Yong 曹邕	Cao Gong 曹貢	Cao Yan 曹儼
Cao Xun 曹尋	Cao Wen^{1} 曹溫

Four of Cao Pi's wives – Consorts Li, Su, Zhang and Song – bore him children as such: Consort Li bore Cao Xie; Consort Su bore Cao Yong; Consort Zhang bore Cao Gong; Consort Song bore Cao Yan.

Cao Xie's son was Cao Xun. Cao Yong's successor was Cao Wen, a son of his cousin Cao Kai (Cao Zhang's son). Both Cao Gong and Cao Yan died without heirs.

- ^{1} Cao Wen was actually a son of Cao Kai (Cao Zhang's son). Cao Yong died without an heir so Cao Wen was chosen to succeed him.

=== Cao Pi's other wives and children ===
Liu Xie 劉協; Bohe 伯和
Lady Liu 劉氏	Lady Liu 劉氏
Guo Yong 郭永	Lady Dong 董氏
Consort Yin 陰貴人	Consort Chai 柴貴人
Cao Pi 曹丕; Zihuan 子桓	Guo Nüwang 郭女王
Lady Ren 任氏	Lady Li 李氏
Cao Jie 曹喈; Zhongyong 仲雍

Cao Pi had seven other wives: the two Ladies Liu, Consort Yin, Consort Chai, Lady Ren, Lady Li and Guo Nüwang. The two Ladies Liu were the daughters of Liu Xie (Emperor Xian of Han). Guo Nüwang was the daughter of Guo Yong and Lady Dong.

Cao Pi had a son, Cao Jie. The identity of Cao Jie's mother is not known.

== Cao Rui ==
Mao Jia 毛嘉
Mao Zeng 毛曾	Empress Mao 毛皇后
Lady Zhang 張才人	Lady He 何才人
Cao Jiong 曹冏	Cao Mu 曹穆

Guo Man 郭滿	Lady Du 杜氏
Empress Guo 郭皇后
Cao Rui 曹叡; Yuanzhong 元仲	Lady Yu 虞妃
Cao Yin 曹殷	Cao Fang^{1} 曹芳; Lanqing 蘭卿	Cao Xun^{2} 曹詢
Ren Kai^{3} 任愷; Yuanbao 元褒	First Princess of Qi 齊長公主 (name unknown)	Cao Shu 曹淑

Cao Rui had five wives: Empress Mao, Empress Guo, Lady Zhang, Lady He and Lady Yu. Empress Mao was Mao Jia's daughter and she had a younger brother, Mao Zeng. Empress Guo was the daughter of Guo Man and Lady Du.

Cao Rui had three sons (Cao Jiong, Cao Mu and Cao Yin) and two daughters (Cao Shu and the First Princess of Qi). The First Princess of Qi (personal name unknown) married Li Feng's son Li Tao (李韜) initially, but was later remarried to Ren Kai.

Cao Rui also had two adoptive sons: Cao Fang and Cao Xun, who were allegedly the sons of Cao Zhang's son, Cao Kai (曹楷).

- ^{1} Cao Fang was Cao Rui's adoptive son. His biological father was alleged to be Cao Zhang's son Cao Kai.
- ^{2} Cao Xun was Cao Rui's adoptive son.
- ^{3} The First Princess of Qi married Li Tao initially, but she was later remarried to Ren Kai.

== Cao Fang ==
Zhen Yan 甄儼	Zhang Ji 張既; Derong 德容
Gentleman Zhen (name unknown)	Zhang Ji 張緝; Jingzhong 敬仲	Wang Kui 王夔
Empress Zhen 甄皇后	Empress Zhang 張皇后	Empress Wang 王皇后	Lady Zhang 張美人
Cao Fang 曹芳; Lanqing 蘭卿
Li Hua 李華	Liu Xun 劉勳	Yuwan 禺婉	Lady Xing 邢氏

Cao Fang had eight wives: Empress Zhen, a granddaughter of Zhen Yan (Lady Zhen's elder brother); Empress Zhang, a daughter of Zhang Ji (Jingzhong); Empress Wang, Wang Kui's daughter; Lady Zhang; Lady Xing, who later remarried Sun Huan's son Sun Yi (孫壹); Li Hua, Liu Xun; Yuwan.

== See also ==
- Eastern Wu family trees
- Shu Han family trees
- Family tree of Sima Yi
