= Cao Jun =

Cao Jun may refer to:

- Cao Jun (Duke of Fan) (曹均; died 219), a son of the Han dynasty warlord Cao Cao, posthumously honoured as a duke by the Cao Wei state in the Three Kingdoms period
- Cao Jun (Prince of Chenliu) (曹峻; died 259), a son of the Han dynasty warlord Cao Cao, later a prince of the Cao Wei state in the Three Kingdoms period
- Cao Jun (artist) (曹俊, born 1966), Chinese artist living in the United States
