= Cao Ju =

Cao Ju may refer to:

- Cao Ju (Prince of Fanyang) (曹矩), a son of the Han dynasty warlord Cao Cao
- Cao Ju (Prince of Pengcheng) (曹據), a son of the Han dynasty warlord Cao Cao and a prince of the Cao Wei state in the Three Kingdoms period
