= 229 =

229 in various calendars
Gregorian calendar	229; CCXXIX
Ab urbe condita	982
Assyrian calendar	4979
Balinese saka calendar	150–151
Bengali calendar	−365 – −364
Berber calendar	1179
Buddhist calendar	773
Burmese calendar	−409
Byzantine calendar	5737–5738
Chinese calendar	戊申年 (Earth Monkey); 2926 or 2719 — to — 己酉年 (Earth Rooster); 2927 or 2720
Coptic calendar	−55 – −54
Discordian calendar	1395
Ethiopian calendar	221–222
Hebrew calendar	3989–3990
- Hindu calendars
Vikram Samvat	285–286
Shaka Samvat	150–151
Kali Yuga	3329–3330
Holocene calendar	10229
Iranian calendar	393 BP – 392 BP
Islamic calendar	405 BH – 404 BH
Javanese calendar	107–108
Julian calendar	229; CCXXIX
Korean calendar	2562
Minguo calendar	1683 before ROC 民前1683年
Nanakshahi calendar	−1239
Seleucid era	540/541 AG
Thai solar calendar	771–772
Tibetan calendar	阳土猴年 (male Earth-Monkey); 355 or −26 or −798 — to — 阴土鸡年 (female Earth-Rooster); 356 or −25 or −797

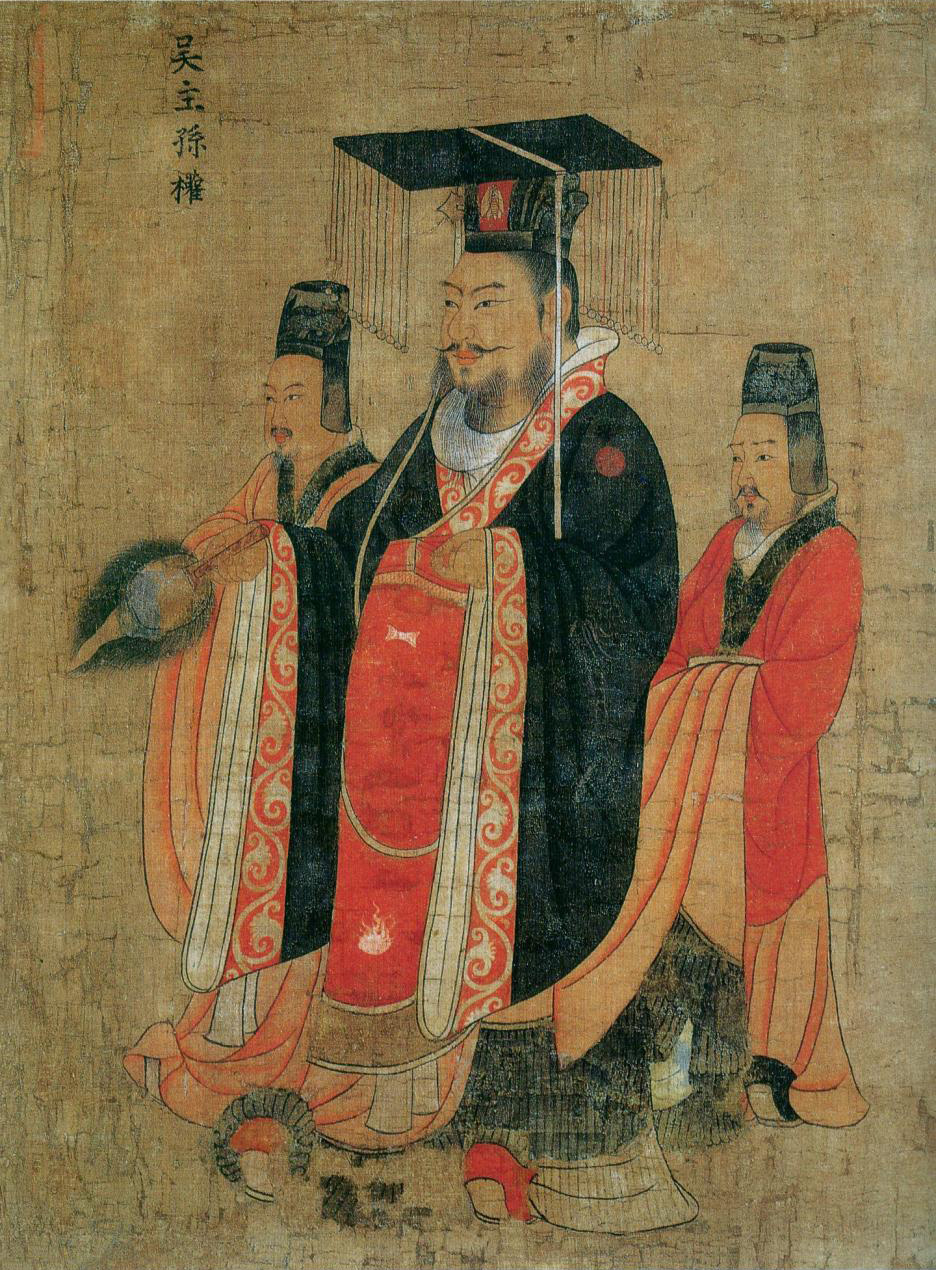
Emperor Sun Quan by Yan Liben

Year 229 (CCXXIX) was a common year starting on Thursday of the Julian calendar. At the time, it was known as the Year of the Consulship of Severus and Cassius (or, less frequently, year 982 Ab urbe condita). The denomination 229 for this year has been used since the early medieval period, when the Anno Domini calendar era became the prevalent method in Europe for naming years.

== Events ==
=== By place ===
==== Roman Empire ====
- Emperor Alexander Severus and Dio Cassius are joint Consuls.

==== China ====
- February – May – Battle of Jianwei: The state of Shu Han is victorious over the state of Cao Wei.
- June 23 – Chinese warlord Sun Quan formally declares himself emperor of the Eastern Wu state. The city of Jianye (modern Nanjing) is founded as the capital of Eastern Wu. The independent kingdoms in Cambodia and Laos become Eastern Wu vassals.
- Eastern Wu merchants reach Vietnam; ocean transport is improved to such an extent that sea journeys are made to the Liaodong Peninsula and the island of Yizhou.

=== By topic ===
==== Art and Science ====
- Ammonius Saccas renews Greek philosophy by creating Neoplatonism.

== Deaths ==
- Cao Li, Chinese prince of the Cao Wei state (b. 208)
- Cao Yong, Chinese prince of the Cao Wei state
- Zhao Yun, Chinese general of the Shu Han state
