= Cao Xun =

Prince of Qin and adopted son of Cao Rui (231-244)

Cao Xun 曹詢

Prince of Qin (秦王)
- Tenure: 23 September 235 – September or October 244
- Born: 231 (Note: Cao Fang's biography in the Sanguozhi recorded that Cao Xun died in the 8th month of the 5th year of the Zhengshi era of Cao Fang's reign. This month corresponds to 19 September to 18 October 244 in the Gregorian calendar. The Wei Shi Chunqiu also recorded that Cao Xun was nine years old (by East Asian age reckoning) when Cao Rui died in 239. He was a year older than Cao Fang at the time. Therefore, Cao Xun was born in 231.)
- Died: September or October 244 (aged 13)
Names
- Family name: Cao (曹); Given name: Xun (詢)
- House: House of Cao
- Father: Cao Rui (adoptive)

Cao Xun (231 – September or October 244) was an imperial prince of the state of Cao Wei in the Three Kingdoms period of China. He was an adopted son of Cao Rui, the second emperor of Wei. While the identities of his parents are unknown, Cao Xun was allegedly a son of Cao Kai (曹楷), the son of Cao Zhang (Cao Rui's uncle). On 23 September 235, Cao Rui enfeoffed Cao Xun as the Prince of Qin (秦王). Cao Xun died sometime between 19 September and 18 October 244.

== See also ==
- Lists of people of the Three Kingdoms
- Cao Wei family trees § Cao Rui
