= Princess Changle =

Princess Changle is a title bestowed upon numerous Chinese princesses. It may refer to:

- Li Lizhi, Tang dynasty princess
- Liu Man, Han dynasty princess
