= Cao Xuan =

Cao Xuan may refer to:

- Cao Xuan (Cao Cao's son) (fl. 210s), a son of the Han dynasty warlord Cao Cao
- Cao Xuân Dục (1843–1923), scholar, historian-mandarin and court adviser in the Nguyễn dynasty of Vietnam
- Cao Xuan (footballer) (born 1985), Chinese footballer
