= Prince of Dongping =

Prince of Dongping may refer to:

- Cao Hui (Prince of Dongping) (died 242), Cao Wei prince
- Zhu Wen (852–912), known as Prince of Dongping during the late Tang dynasty
