= Cao Song =

Eastern Han dynasty official (died 193)

- 曹嵩

Grand Commandant (太尉)
- In office 187 – 188
- Monarch: Emperor Ling of Han
- Preceded by: Cui Lie

Minister Herald (大鴻臚)
- In office ? – 187
- Monarch: Emperor Ling of Han

Minister of Finance (大司農)
- In office ?–?
- Monarch: Emperor Ling of Han

Personal details
- Born: Unknown (Note: As Cao Cao was born in c.155, Cao Song's birth year should be in the early 140s or before.) Bozhou, Anhui
- Died: 193 (Note: Ying Shao's biography in Houhanshu recorded that Cao Song died in the 1st year of the Xingping era of Emperor Xian's reign (c.194).) Linyi, Shandong
- Children: Cao Cao; Cao Bin; Cao De; Marquis Ai of Haiyang
- Relatives: Cao Teng (adoptive father); See also Cao Wei family trees
- Occupation: Official
- Courtesy name: Jugao (巨高)
Posthumous name
- Emperor Tai (太皇帝)

Cao Song (died 193), courtesy name Jugao, was an official who lived during the Eastern Han dynasty of China. He was the foster son of the eunuch Cao Teng and the father of the warlord Cao Cao, who rose to prominence in the final years of Eastern Han and laid the foundation of the state of Cao Wei in the Three Kingdoms period. Cao Song was posthumously honoured as "Emperor Tai" ("Grand Emperor") by his grandson Cao Pi in 220 when the latter ended the Han dynasty and founded the Cao Wei regime.

== Career ==
Cao Song was known to be honest, sincere and of good moral conduct. He served as the Colonel-Director of Retainers (司隸校尉) in the Han imperial court. During the reign of Emperor Ling, he served consecutively as the Minister of Finance (大司農) and Minister Herald (大鴻臚) before replacing Cui Lie (崔烈) as the Grand Commandant (太尉). However, it was alleged that Cao Song obtained the post of Grand Commandant by bribing eunuchs, who were deeply trusted by the emperor. Another account stated that Cao Song purchased those official posts because Emperor Ling introduced a practice of selling political offices for money.

== Death ==
Around 193, Cao Song retired (Note: Cao Song's office(s) after his stint as Grand Commandant were unknown.) and attempted to return to his hometown in Qiao County (譙縣; present-day Bozhou, Anhui). Along the way, he was murdered while passing through Langya State (琅玡國; present-day Linyi, Shandong) in Xu Province. At the same time, Cao Song's eldest son, the warlord Cao Cao, had established a base in Yan Province (covering present-day southwestern Shandong and eastern Henan).

There are four different accounts of Cao Song's death:

- An account from Wei Zhao's Wu Shu (吳書) stated that Cao Song had with him more than 100 carts full of his personal belongings. Tao Qian sent one of his officers, Zhang Kai (張闓), and 200 horsemen to escort Cao Song and his family to Yan Province. At Hua County, Zhang Kai murdered Cao Song, seized his riches and fled to Huainan.
- Tao Qian's biography in Houhanshu wrote that Cao Song was travelling to Langya Commandery to evade chaos. Along the way, he passed by Yinping County (陰平縣; southwest of present-day Zaozhuang, Shandong), where Tao Qian had garrisoned some troops. Tempted by greed, Tao Qian's men killed Cao Song and seized his wealth.
- The Shiyu (世語) (Note: Although he quotes from it extensively in his Annotated Records of the Three Kingdoms, Pei Songzhi had serious reservations about Guo Song's (郭頒) Wei Jin Shiyu, calling it "lame, shallow, and wholly without rhythm". He decries the Shiyu as the poorest history he has consulted, and laments that its errors have propagated into later works. (Records of the Three Kingdoms 4.133)) mentioned that Cao Song was in Hua County (華縣; north of present-day Fei County, Shandong) at the time. Cao Cao ordered Ying Shao, the Administrator of Taishan Commandery (泰山郡; east of present-day Tai'an, Shandong), to escort his father and family to Yan Province. However, before Ying Shao's men arrived, Xu Province's governor Tao Qian secretly sent a few thousand riders to attack Cao Song and his family. Cao Song thought that Ying Shao had come to receive him, so he was unprepared and completely taken by surprise. Tao Qian's men killed Cao De (曹德), one of Cao Song's sons. Cao Song became afraid and brought one of his concubines with him as they tried to squeeze through a crack in a wall to escape. However, Cao Song's concubine was too fat and could not squeeze through, so they hid in the latrine. Tao Qian's men found them eventually and killed Cao Song and all his family members who were with him at the time. (Note: This account is also recorded in Ying Shao's biography in Book of the Later Han, albeit with many details removed.)
- In his Zizhi Tongjian Kaoyi (资治通鉴考异), Sima Guang opinioned that Tao Qian's subordinate(s) joined forces with Que Xuan (闕宣) to kill Cao Song. (Note: However, in Zizhi Tongjian, the account of Cao Song's death is an edited amalgamation of the previous three accounts.)

All accounts agree that Cao Cao held Tao Qian responsible for the murder of his father regardless of the degree of Tao Qian's involvement in the incident. This led to Cao Cao launching an invasion on Xu Province between 193 and 194 to punish Tao Qian for his role in Cao Song's death.

== Posthumous honour ==
In 220, Cao Cao's son and successor, Cao Pi, ended the Eastern Han dynasty and established the state of Cao Wei, marking the start of the Three Kingdoms period. Cao Pi granted his grandfather the posthumous title "Emperor Tai" ("Grand Emperor") on 13 December.

== Family background ==
Cao Song's family background is a mystery. Chen Shou wrote in the Sanguozhi that Cao Song's origin could not be determined, although Chen recorded that Cao Cao was a descendant of Cao Shen.

When there was a discussion in the Cao Wei imperial court on the ritual for ancestor veneration in outdoor settings, Gaotang Long suggested that the emperor of Cao Wei should also worship the mythical Emperor Shun, who was believed to be the ancestor of the Cao clan, the imperial clan of Wei, however Wei official Jiang Ji disagreed and wrote a memorial to point out that Gaotang Long was wrong. He noted that the mythical emperor's family name was actually Gui (媯) and that his descendants later adopted Tian (田) as their family name, therefore he was not an ancestor of the Cao clan. (Note: (初，侍中高堂隆論郊祀事，以魏為舜後，推舜配天。濟以為舜本姓媯，其苗曰田，非曹之先，著文以追詰隆。) Sanguozhi vol. 14.)

In his annotations to Jiang Ji's biography in the Sanguozhi, Pei Songzhi recorded that Jiang Ji claimed that there was a line on Cao Teng's tombstone which read: "The Cao clan originated from Zhu". Pei Songzhi also noted that the Book of Wei (魏書), the official history of the Cao Wei state, wrote by Wang Chen, confirmed Jiang Ji's claim. (Note: (臣松之案蔣濟立郊議稱曹騰碑文云「曹氏族出自邾」，魏書述曹氏胤緒亦如之。) Pei Songzhi's annotation in Sanguozhi vol. 14.) Book of Wei said Cao Cao was a descendant of Lu Zhong (陸終), (Note: (《魏書》曰：其先出於黃帝。當高陽世，陸終之子曰安，是爲曹姓。周武王克殷，存先世之後，封曹俠於邾。春秋之世，與於盟會，逮至戰國，爲楚所滅。子孫分流，或家于沛。漢高祖之起，曹參以功封平陽侯，世襲爵土，絕而復紹，至今適嗣國於容城。) Wei Shu annotation in Sanguozhi vol. 1.) who was a 4th-generation descendant of Zhuanxu.

However, Pei Songzhi also pointed out that there was evidence which contradicted Jiang Ji's claim. When Cao Cao wrote his own family history, he mentioned that he descended from Cao Shu Zhenduo (曹叔振鐸), the first ruler of the vassal state of Cao and a son of King Wen of Zhou. Cao Cao's son Cao Zhi also wrote in a eulogy for his father that they descended from the royal clan of the Zhou dynasty. (Note: (魏武作家傳，自云曹叔振鐸之後。故陳思王作武帝誄曰：「於穆武王，胄稷胤周。」此其不同者也。) Pei Songzhi's annotation in Sanguozhi vol. 14.) In the early Jingchu era (237–239), Cao Rui accepted Gaotang Long's claim that the Wei emperors descended from Emperor Shun. When the Jin dynasty replaced the Cao Wei state, Cao Huan's abdication statement contained the following line: "my imperial ancestor was Yu (Shun)". This resulted in greater discrepancies between sources on the Cao clan's ancestry. (Note: (及至景初，明帝從高堂隆議，謂魏為舜後，後魏為禪晉文，稱「昔我皇祖有虞」，則其異彌甚。) Pei Songzhi's annotation in Sanguozhi vol. 14.)

Gaotang Long was not the only person whom Jiang Ji argued with over the ancestry of the Cao clan. Jiang Ji also debated extensively with Miao Xi (繆襲) and they wrote to each other several times throughout the debate. Their writings, however, were not recorded in history as there were too many. Although Jiang Ji ultimately could not determine the Cao clan's ancestry, he concluded that it was nonsensical and disrespectful to honour Emperor Shun as the Cao clan's ancestor when he was not, and that doing so would be equivalent to insulting Cao Cao. The mistake was not corrected at the time. (Note: (尋濟難隆，及與尚書繆襲往反，並有理據，文多不載。濟亦未能定氏族所出，但謂「魏非舜後而橫祀非族，降黜太祖，不配正天，皆為繆妄」。然于時竟莫能正。) Pei Songzhi's annotation in Sanguozhi vol. 14.)

The Cao Man Zhuan (曹瞞傳) and the Shiyu (世語), two sources used by Pei Songzhi in his annotations to the Sanguozhi, mentioned that Cao Song's original family name was Xiahou (夏侯) and that he was an uncle of Xiahou Dun. Therefore, Cao Cao and Xiahou Dun were cousins.

The Qing dynasty scholar He Zhuo (何焯; 1661–1722) refuted the claim in the Cao Man Zhuan and Shiyu that Cao Song was from the Xiahou clan and dismissed it as a rumour started by people from Eastern Wu, a state founded by Cao Cao's rival, Sun Quan. (Note: The Cao Man Zhuan is believed to have had its origins in Eastern Wu, while the Shiyu was written by Guo Song (郭頒) during the Jin dynasty.) This was because Xiahou Dun's son Xiahou Mao married Cao Cao's daughter Princess Qinghe (清河公主), and Xiahou Yuan's son Xiahou Heng (夏侯衡) married Cao Cao's niece, so the Xiahous and Caos could not have shared the same lineage.

On the other hand, the Qing dynasty historians Pan Mei (潘眉; 1771–1841) and Lin Guozan (林國贊) believed it was true that Cao Song was a Xiahou, as evident from the fact that Chen Shou placed the biographies of Xiahou Dun, Xiahou Yuan, Xiahou Shang, Cao Ren, Cao Hong, Cao Xiu, Cao Zhen in the same volume (volume 9) in the Sanguozhi.

Li Jingxing (李景星; 1876–1934), a scholar who lived in the late Qing dynasty, speculated that when Chen Shou wrote that Cao Song's origin could not be determined, his intention was to expose a scandal behind Cao Cao's family background.

Wu Jinhua (吳金華), a history professor from Fudan University, believed that Chen Shou employed a writing technique to distort facts when he wrote that Cao Song's origin could not be determined. Wu consolidated all the earlier differing viewpoints and pointed out three pieces of evidence to prove that Cao Song was from the Xiahou family:

- The Weilüe recorded a letter written by Sun Quan to the Wei official Hao Zhou (浩周) sometime between 220 and 222, when Sun was nominally a vassal of the Wei regime. The letter mentioned that Hao Zhou suggested that Sun Quan's son could establish marital ties with the Cao family in the same way as how the Caos and Xiahous were connected by marriages. This proved that the claim that Cao Song was a Xiahou was not a rumour spread by people from Wu because a person from Wei already spoke of it sometime between 220 and 222. (Note: Sun Quan was a vassal of Wei from 220–222.)
- The Wei Shu (魏書) mentioned that when Xiahou Dun died, Cao Pi dressed in plain clothing and mourned at the eastern gate of Ye (in present-day Handan, Hebei). The Eastern Jin dynasty historian Sun Sheng commented that it was still within traditions for an emperor to mourn his kinsmen outside of an ancestral temple, and that Cao Pi had clearly lost his composure when he cried for Xiahou Dun at the city gate. As Sun Sheng lived during the Eastern Jin dynasty (317–420), not long after the Three Kingdoms period ended in 280, his remark gave an impression that the people in his time were already aware that Cao Song was from the Xiahou clan.
- Between 1974 and 1979, parts of a tombstone from Cao Cao's family ancestral tomb were unearthed in Bozhou, Anhui (the ancestral home of Cao Cao's clan). The Chinese characters "xia hou you" (夏侯右) were inscribed on it.

The late Qing dynasty writer Zhou Shouchang (周壽昌; 1814–1884) explained in Sanguozhi Zhu Zheng Yi (三國志注證遺) about the inter-clan marriages between the Caos and Xiahous. He cited Chen Jiao (陳矯) (Note: Chen Jiao served under Cao Cao and later Cao Wei; he has a biography in vol.22 of Sanguozhi. His son Chen Qian later served the Western Jin, and has a biography in vol.35 of Book of Jin.) as an example – Chen Jiao's original family name was "Liu" (劉). He was raised by his uncle (his paternal aunt's husband), whose family name was "Chen" (陳), and adopted "Chen" as his family name. Chen Jiao later married the daughter of Liu Song (劉頌), a close relative. Cao Cao appreciated Chen Jiao's talent and wanted to protect Chen's reputation, so he gave an order forbidding any dissent about Chen's personal life. Zhou Shouchang felt that when Cao Cao banned people from speaking against marriages between those who share the same family name, he was actually making it convenient to cover up his own family background.

Wu Jinhua also pointed out that in the late Han dynasty and the Three Kingdoms period, it was not uncommon to find married couples who shared the same family name. For example, one of Cao Cao's foster sons, He Yan, married Cao's daughter Princess Jinxiang (金鄉公主), who was possibly his half-sister (born to the same mother), even though the identity of the princess's mother is not confirmed. Wu Jinhua mentioned that a person will have no doubts that Cao Song was from the Xiahou clan as long as he/she understands that inter-clan marriages were not unusual in that era.

Others such as history professors Zhu Ziyan (朱子彥) and Han Sheng (韓昇) argue that the accounts from the Cao Man Zhuan and Shiyu are not reliable, and the fact that Xiahou Mao, Xiahou Heng and Xiahou Shang married women from Cao Cao's clan proved that Cao Song was not a Xiahou.

The claim that Cao Cao is a descendant of Cao Shen has been refuted by genetic evidence. Testing of documented living descendants of the Cao Cao, combined with ancient DNA analysis of a tooth from his granduncle Cao Ding, placed Cao Cao in Y-DNA haplogroup O-M175 (specifically O2-M268). A follow-up study refined his haplogroup to O1b1-F1462(xPK4).

== See also ==
- Lists of people of the Three Kingdoms
- Cao Wei family trees#Cao Song
