= Cao Ju (Prince of Pengcheng) =

3rd century prince of the state of Cao Wei

Cao Ju 曹據

Prince of Pengcheng (彭城王)
- Tenure: 232 – early 260s
- Tenure: 222 or after – 224 or before

Prince of Dingtao (定陶王)
- Tenure: 224–232

Prince of Jiyin (濟陰王)
- Tenure: 222 or after – 224 or before

Prince of Yiyang (義陽王)
- Tenure: 222 – 222 or after

Prince of Zhangling (章陵王)
- Tenure: 222
- Born: between 196 and 211 (Note: Cao Chong was born in 196. Since Cao Ju was younger than Cao Chong, he must have been born after 196.)
- Died: Unknown
- Issue: Cao Cong; Cao Fan; Cao Chan
Names
- Family name: Cao (曹); Given name: Ju (據)
- House: House of Cao
- Father: Cao Cao
- Mother: Consort Huan

Cao Ju (fl.211 – early 260s) was an imperial prince of the state of Cao Wei in the Three Kingdoms period of China.

== Life ==
Cao Ju was a son of Cao Cao, a warlord who rose to prominence towards the end of the Han dynasty and laid the foundation for the Cao Wei state. His mother was Lady Huan (環氏), a concubine of Cao Cao. He had two full brothers: Cao Chong (elder) and Cao Yu (younger). Cao Yu's son Cao Huan would become the last emperor of Cao Wei.

In 211, Cao Ju was enfeoffed as the "Marquis of Fanyang" (范陽侯) by Emperor Xian, the figurehead emperor of the Han dynasty under Cao Cao's control. In 217, his title was changed to "Marquis of Wan" (宛侯).

In 220, following Cao Cao's death in March, Cao Ju's half-brother Cao Pi usurped the throne from Emperor Xian during the winter of that year, ended the Han dynasty, and established the Cao Wei imperial state with himself as the new emperor. Cao Pi first enfeoffed Cao Ju as a duke in 221 and promoted him to a prince under the title "Prince of Zhangling" (章陵王) in 222. Later in 222, he changed Cao Ju's title to "Prince of Yiyang" (義陽王). Sometime between 222 and 224, he changed Cao Ju's title to "Prince of Pengcheng" (彭城王) and relocated him to Pengcheng commandery (around present-day Xuzhou, Jiangsu), where Cao Ju's mother Lady Huan was living. Later, he changed Cao Ju's title to "Prince of Jiyin" (濟陰王). In 224, Cao Pi issued an edict to reform the nobility system by reducing the sizes of princedoms from commanderies to counties. Cao Ju's title was thus changed to "Prince of Dingtao" (定陶王).

In 232, after Cao Pi's successor Cao Rui restored the previous nobility system, Cao Ju became Prince of Pengcheng again. In 237, Cao Ju had 2,000 taxable households removed from his princedom as punishment after he was found guilty of ordering the manufacture of restricted items. Cao Rui also issued an imperial edict to reprimand Cao Ju for his conduct. The 2,000 taxable households were returned to him in 239, during the reign of Cao Fang.

According to the Book of Jin, after Sima Shi had deposed Cao Fang in October 254, he proposed that Cao Ju be made the next emperor of Cao Wei. Cao Rui's widow Empress Dowager Guo did not agree as that would mean that Cao Rui would have no descendants to make offerings to him. Also, it would have made her status awkward as within the Cao clan, Cao Ju was senior to Rui. She proposed that Cao Mao be made emperor instead. After some minor protests, Sima Shi agreed to Lady Guo's proposal.

Throughout the reigns of the subsequent Wei emperors Cao Mao and Cao Huan, the number of taxable households in Cao Ju's princedom increased until it reached 4,600.

== Family ==
Cao Ju had at least three sons. One of them, Cao Cong (曹琮), was designated as the heir of Cao Ju's elder brother Cao Chong, because Cao Chong died early and had no son to succeed him. The other two, Cao Fan (曹範) and Cao Chan (曹闡), were consecutively designated as the heirs of Cao Zizheng, a half-brother of Cao Ju, because Cao Zizheng too died early and had no son to succeed him.

== See also ==
- Cao Wei family trees#Lady Huan
- Lists of people of the Three Kingdoms
