= Cao Yong (Three Kingdoms) =

Cao Wei prince and son of Cao Pi (died 229)

Cao Yong 曹邕

Prince of Handan (邯鄲王)
- Tenure: 225–229
- Successor: Cao Wen

Prince of Chen (陳王)
- Tenure: 223–225

Prince of Huainan (淮南王)
- Tenure: 222–223

Duke of Huainan (淮南公)
- Tenure: 221–222
- Born: Unknown
- Died: 229
Names
- Family name: Cao (曹); Given name: Yong (邕)
Posthumous name
- Prince Huai (懷王)
- House: House of Cao
- Father: Cao Pi
- Mother: Consort Su

Cao Yong (died 229) was a prince in the state of Cao Wei in the Three Kingdoms period of China. He was a son of Cao Pi, the first emperor of Wei. His mother, Consort Su (蘇姬), was a concubine of Cao Pi. He was enfeoffed as the Duke of Huainan (淮南公) in 221, with his dukedom in Jiujiang Commandery (九江郡). In 222, he was elevated to the status of Prince of Huainan (淮南王). A year later, his title was changed to Prince of Chen (陳王). In 225, his title was changed again to Prince of Handan (邯鄲王). He died in 229 during the reign of his half-brother Cao Rui. He had no offspring.

In 231, since Cao Yong had no descendants, Cao Rui designated Cao Wen (曹溫), a son of Cao Kai (曹楷) and grandson of Cao Zhang, as Cao Yong's heir; Cao Wen thus became the new Prince of Handan. In 232, Cao Wen's title was changed to Prince of Luyang (魯陽王). In the reigns of the subsequent Wei emperors, the number of taxable households in Cao Wen's princedom increased until it reached 4,400.

== See also ==
- Cao Wei family trees#Consorts Li, Su, Zhang, and Song
- Lists of people of the Three Kingdoms
