= Cao Li =

Cao Wei state prince and son of Cao Pi (208–229)

Cao Li 曹禮

Prince of Yuancheng (元城王)
- Tenure: 225 – May or June 229
- Successor: Cao Ti

Prince of Jingzhao (京兆王)
- Tenure: 222–225

Duke of Qin (秦公)
- Tenure: 221–222
- Born: 208
- Died: May or June 229 (aged 21) (Note: Cao Rui's biography in the Sanguozhi recorded that Cao Li died in the 4th month of the 3rd year of the Taihe era of Cao Rui's reign. This month corresponds to 11 May to 9 June 229 in the Gregorian calendar.)
Names
- Family name: Cao (曹); Given name: Li (禮)
Posthumous name
- Prince Ai (哀王)
- House: House of Cao
- Father: Cao Pi
- Mother: Consort Xu

Cao Li (208 – May or June 229) was a prince in the state of Cao Wei in the Three Kingdoms period of China. He was a son of Cao Pi, the first emperor of Wei. His mother, Consort Xu (徐姬), was a concubine of Cao Pi. He had two full sisters: the elder one was Princess Linfen (臨汾公主) while the younger one, who was unnamed, died early. Cao Li was enfeoffed as the Duke of Qin (秦公) in 221, with his dukedom in Jingzhao Commandery (京兆郡). In 222, he was elevated to the status of Prince of Jingzhao (京兆王). In 225, his title was changed to Prince of Yuancheng (元城王). He died in 229 during the reign of his half-brother Cao Rui. He has no offspring.

In 231, Since Cao Li had no descendants, Cao Rui designated Cao Ti (曹悌), a son of Cao Kai (曹楷) and grandson of Cao Zhang, as Cao Li's heir; Cao Ti thus became the new Prince of Yuancheng. In 232, Cao Ti's title was changed to Prince of Liang (梁王). Throughout the reigns of the subsequent Wei emperors, the number of taxable households in Cao Ti's princedom increased until it reached 4,500.

== See also ==
- Cao Wei family trees#Consort Xu
- Lists of people of the Three Kingdoms
