= Cao Zizheng =

Son of Chinese warlord Cao Cao (d. 218)

Cao Zizheng 曹子整

Duke of Mei (郿公) (posthumous)
- Successor: Cao Fan

Marquis of Mei (郿侯)
- Tenure: 217 – 218
- Born: Unknown
- Died: 218
Names
- Family name: Cao (曹); Given name / Courtesy name: Zizheng (子整)
Posthumous name
- Duke Dai (戴公)
- House: House of Cao
- Father: Cao Cao
- Mother: Lady Li

Cao Zizheng (died 218) was a son of Cao Cao, a warlord who rose to power in the late Eastern Han dynasty and laid the foundation for the state of Cao Wei in the Three Kingdoms period of China. His mother was Lady Li (李姬), a concubine of Cao Cao. She also bore Cao Cao two other sons: Cao Zicheng and Cao Zijing. As his uncle Cao Shao (曹紹) had no heir, Cao Zizheng was adopted as Cao Shao's son. In 217, he was enfeoffed as the Marquis of Mei (郿侯). He died in the following year without a son to succeed him.

In 220, Cao Zizheng's half-brother Cao Pi became the first emperor of the Cao Wei state after usurping the throne from Emperor Xian, the last emperor of the Han dynasty. The following year, he honoured Cao Zizheng with the posthumous title "Duke Dai of Mei" (郿戴公), and ordered Cao Fan (曹範), a son of Cao Ju, to be Cao Zizheng's heir. In 222, Cao Pi enfeoffed Cao Fan as the Marquis of Pingshi (平氏侯), but changed his title to Marquis of Chengwu (成武侯) in the following year. In 229, Cao Pi's successor, Cao Rui, promoted Cao Fan from a marquis to a duke. Cao Fan died in 235 without a son to succeed him, and was posthumously honoured as "Duke Dao" (悼公). In 236, Cao Rui ordered Cao Chan (曹闡), Cao Fan's younger brother, to be Cao Fan's heir. Cao Chan thus became the new Duke of Mei (郿公). Throughout the reigns of the subsequent Wei emperors, the number of taxable households in Cao Chan's dukedom increased until it reached 1,800.

== See also ==
- Cao Wei family trees#Consort Li
- Lists of people of the Three Kingdoms
