= Cao Zicheng =

Son of Chinese warlord Cao Cao

Cao Zicheng 曹子乘

Duke of Gucheng (穀城公) (posthumous)
- Born: Unknown
- Died: Unknown
Names
- Family name: Cao (曹); Given name / Courtesy name: Zicheng (子乘)
Posthumous name
- Duke Shang (殤公)
- House: House of Cao
- Father: Cao Cao
- Mother: Lady Li

Cao Zicheng (birth and death dates unknown) was a son of Cao Cao, a warlord who rose to power in the late Eastern Han dynasty and laid the foundation for the state of Cao Wei in the Three Kingdoms period of China. His mother was Lady Li (李姬), a concubine of Cao Cao. She also bore Cao Cao two other sons: Cao Zizheng and Cao Zijing. Cao Zicheng died early and had no son to succeed him. He was posthumously honoured as "Duke Shang of Gucheng" (穀城殤公) in 231 by Cao Rui, the second emperor of the Cao Wei state.

== See also ==
- Cao Wei family trees#Consort Li
- Lists of people of the Three Kingdoms
