= Cao Ziji =

Son of Chinese warlord Cao Cao

Cao Ziji 曹子棘

Duke of Guangzong (廣宗公) (posthumous)
- Born: Unknown
- Died: Unknown
Names
- Family name: Cao (曹); Given name / Courtesy name: Ziji (子棘)
Posthumous name
- Duke Shang (殤公)
- House: House of Cao
- Father: Cao Cao
- Mother: Lady Liu

Cao Ziji (birth and death dates unknown) was a son of Cao Cao, a warlord who rose to power in the late Eastern Han dynasty and laid the foundation for the state of Cao Wei in the Three Kingdoms period of China. His mother was Lady Liu (劉姬), a concubine of Cao Cao. Cao Ziji died early and had no son to succeed him. He was posthumously honoured as "Duke Shang of Guangzong" (廣宗殤公) in 231 by Cao Rui, the second emperor of the Cao Wei state.

== See also ==
- Cao Wei family trees#Cao Cao's other wives and children
- Lists of people of the Three Kingdoms
