= Cao Rui (Prince of Beihai) =

Son of Cao Pi and Prince of Beihai (died 233)

Cao Rui 曹蕤

Prince of Beihai (北海王)
- Tenure: 232 – 13 June 233
- Successor: Cao Zan

Prince of Yangping County (陽平縣王)
- Tenure: 3 August 226 – 232
- Born: Unknown
- Died: 13 June 233 (Note: The Sanguozhi recorded that the Prince of Beihai died on the wu'yin day of the 5th month of the 1st year of the Qing'long era of Cao Rui's reign. This date corresponds to 13 June 233 in the Gregorian calendar.)
Names
- Family name: Cao (曹); Given name: Rui (蕤)
Posthumous name
- Prince Dao (悼王)
- House: House of Cao
- Father: Cao Pi
- Mother: Lady Pan

Cao Rui (died 13 June 233) was a prince in the state of Cao Wei in the Three Kingdoms period of China. He was a son of Cao Pi, the first emperor of Wei. His mother, whose family name was Pan (潘), was a concubine of Cao Pi holding the rank of shuyuan (淑媛; translated "Decent Concubine"). He was enfeoffed as the Prince of Yangping County (陽平縣王) in 226 after his half-brother, Cao Rui (曹叡; note the different character for Rui), succeeded their father as the emperor of Wei (with the posthumous title of "Emperor Ming of Wei"). In 232, his title was changed to Prince of Beihai (北海王). He died in 233 and had no offspring.

In 234, since the deceased Prince of Beihai had no descendants, Emperor Ming designated Cao Zan (曹贊; son of Cao Min (曹敏) Prince of Langya, son of Cao Jun Duke An of Fan) as his heir and enfeoffed Cao Zan as the Duke of Chang District (昌鄉公). In 238, Cao Zan was promoted to Prince of Rao'an (饒安王). In 246, during the reign of Cao Fang, Cao Zan's title was changed to Prince of Wen'an (文安王). Throughout the reigns of the subsequent Wei emperors, the number of taxable households in Cao Zan's princedom increased until it reached 3,500.

== See also ==
- Cao Wei family trees#Ladies Pan, Zhu, and Qiu
- Lists of people of the Three Kingdoms
