= Cao Mao (Prince of Laoling) =

Imperial prince of the state of Cao Wei

Cao Mao 曹茂

Prince of Laoling (樂陵王) (Note: When used as part of the name of the location "乐陵", the character "樂/乐" is pronounced as "lào"; see Laoling.)
- Tenure: 244–?

Prince of Quyang (曲陽王)
- Tenure: 232–244

Prince of Liaocheng (聊城王)
- Reign: 227–232

Duke of Liaocheng (聊城公)
- Tenure: 227–227

Duke of Zhongqiu (中丘公)
- Tenure: 226–227

Duke of Chengshi (乘氏公)
- Tenure: 222–226
- Born: Unknown
- Died: Unknown
- Issue: Cao Song; many other sons
- House: House of Cao
- Father: Cao Cao
- Mother: Consort Zhao

Cao Mao (fl. 217–260s) was an imperial prince of the state of Cao Wei in the Three Kingdoms period of China.

== Life ==
Cao Mao was a son of Cao Cao, a warlord who rose to prominence towards the end of the Han dynasty and laid the foundation for the Cao Wei state. His mother was Consort Zhao (趙姬), a concubine of Cao Cao. He was enfeoffed as the "Marquis of Wansui Village" (萬歲亭侯) in 217 by Emperor Xian, the figurehead emperor of the Han dynasty. In the following year, his title was changed to "Marquis of Pingyu" (平輿侯). In his younger days, Cao Mao was never in his father's favour because he was known for being cruel and arrogant.

In 220, following Cao Cao's death, Cao Mao's half-brother Cao Pi usurped the throne from Emperor Xian, ended the Han dynasty, and established the Cao Wei state with himself as the new emperor. Unlike all his other brothers, Cao Mao was not enfeoffed as a prince by Cao Pi. Instead, he was enfeoffed as the "Duke of Chengshi" (乘氏公). His title was changed to "Duke of Zhongqiu" (中丘公) in 226.

In 227, Cao Pi's son and successor, Cao Rui, changed Cao Mao's title to "Duke of Liaocheng" (聊城公). Later that year, Cao Rui issued an imperial edict declaring that the Grand Empress Dowager once said that even though Cao Mao's poor conduct made him unworthy of being a prince, he could still become a prince if he expressed remorse for his past actions and behaved well. As Cao Mao probably improved his behaviour over the years, Cao Rui decided to promote Cao Mao from a duke to a prince under the title "Prince of Liaocheng" (聊城王). In 232, Cao Rui changed Cao Mao's title to "Prince of Quyang" (曲陽王).

When his half-brother Cao Hui, the Prince of Dongping, died in 242, Cao Mao claimed that he was sick and used that as an excuse to not participate in the memorial service. Later, someone reported to the imperial court that Cao Mao lied about his illness because he was seen going about his usual activities during that period. As punishment, Cao Mao had one county with 500 taxable households removed from his princedom. In 244, he was relocated to Laoling Commandery (樂陵郡; around present-day Yangxin County, Shandong), so his title was changed to "Prince of Laoling" (樂陵王). As the taxable households in Cao Mao's princedom provided insufficient revenue to support him and his many sons, the imperial court returned the 500 households to him and added another 700 to his princedom. The number of taxable households in Cao Mao's princedom increased throughout the reigns of the subsequent Wei emperors until it reached 5,000 in the reign of Cao Huan.

Cao Mao had many sons. One of them, Cao Song (曹竦), was designated as the Prince of Xiang (相王) by the imperial court in 255 because the previous prince, Cao Yan (曹偃), died without a son to inherit his princedom.

== See also ==
- Cao Wei family trees#Cao Cao's other wives and children
- Lists of people of the Three Kingdoms
