= Gaotang Sheng =

Confucian scholar

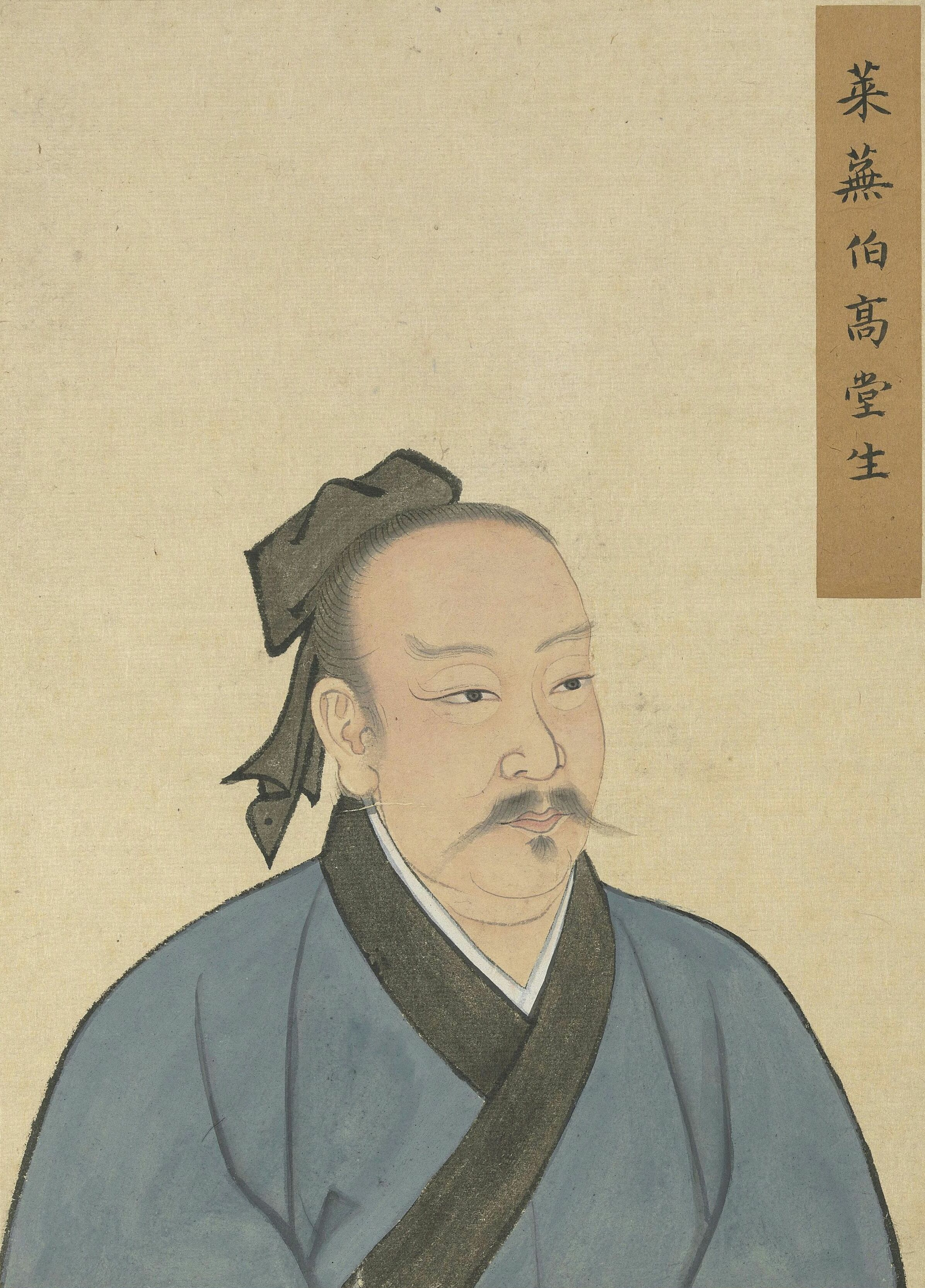
Yuan dynasty portrait.

Gaotang Sheng (Chinese: 高堂生), courtesy name Bo (Chinese: 伯), was a Confucian scholar of the Western Han. He was from today's Qufu, Shandong. An expert on the ritual classics, he is credited with passing on the Yili.

He was an ancestor of Cao Wei official Gaotang Long.
