= Cao Yan =

Prince of Guangping and son of Cao Pi (died 223)

Cao Yan 曹儼

Prince of Guangping (廣平王)
- Tenure: 222–223
- Born: Unknown
- Died: 223
Names
- Family name: Cao (曹); Given name: Yan (儼)
Posthumous name
- Prince Ai (哀王)
- House: House of Cao
- Father: Cao Pi
- Mother: Consort Song

Cao Yan (died 223) was a prince in the state of Cao Wei in the Three Kingdoms period of China. He was a son of Cao Pi, the first emperor of Wei. His mother, Consort Song (宋姬), was a concubine of Cao Pi. He was enfeoffed as the Prince of Guangping (廣平王) in 222. After his death in the following year, his princedom was abolished because he had no son to inherit it.

== See also ==
- Cao Wei family trees#Consorts Li, Su, Zhang, and Song
- Lists of people of the Three Kingdoms
