= Empress Cao (Han dynasty) =

Empress of China from 215 to 220

Cao Jie 曹節

Empress of the Han dynasty
- Tenure: 6 March 215 – 25 November 220
- Predecessor: Empress Fu

Duchess of Shanyang (山陽公夫人)
- Tenure: 25 November 220 – 2 July 260
- Born: Unknown (Note: Both Cao Cao's biography in Sanguozhi and Cao Jie's biography in Houhanshu recorded that among the Cao sisters, the younger ones were allowed to remain at Wei; they would join their husband when they were old enough to consummate the marriage. This implies that at least Cao Hua was wedded at a young age. In Romance of the Three Kingdoms, Cao Jie addressed Cao Pi as "elder brother".)
- Died: 2 July 260 (Note: Cao Huan's biography in the Sanguozhi recorded that Cao Jie died on the jiwei day of the 6th month of the 1st year of the Jingyuan era of Cao Huan's reign. This date corresponds to 2 July 260 in the Gregorian calendar.)
- Spouse: Emperor Xian of Han
- Issue: Liu Man (Princess Changle)
Posthumous name
- Empress Xianmu (獻穆皇后)
- Father: Cao Cao

Cao Jie (died 2 July 260), posthumous name Empress Xianmu, was the last empress consort of the Eastern Han dynasty of China. She was the second wife of Emperor Xian, the last Han emperor, and became known as the Duchess of Shanyang after her husband's abdication. She was a half-sister of Cao Pi, who ended the Han dynasty by forcing Emperor Xian to abdicate the throne in his favour and established the state of Cao Wei. She fiercely opposed the coup d'état orchestrated by Cao Pi, repeatedly refusing to hand over the imperial seal.

Empress Xianmu is praised in the traditional point of view as the last defender of the failed Han Dynasty, alongside Empress Fu Shou and Lady Dong (Dong Cheng's daughter) in contrast to Emperor Xian's negligence.

== Family background and marriage to Emperor Xian ==
Cao Jie was a daughter of the warlord Cao Cao, who by 196 had Emperor Xian under his control and issuing edicts in Emperor Xian's name to his own benefit in his campaign to reunite the empire, which had been held by regional warlords. In 213, Cao, who by that point had been created the Duke of Wei (later King of Wei in 216), offered three daughters to be Emperor Xian's consorts – Cao Jie and her elder sister, Cao Xian (曹憲), and younger sister, Cao Hua (曹華). Initially, their titles were Furen (夫人); in 214, their titles were upgraded to Guiren (貴人).

In late 214, Emperor Xian's first wife Empress Fu Shou was discovered to have advocated a conspiracy against Cao Cao in 200. Although 14 years had elapsed, Cao Cao was still so angry at her that he forcibly had her deposed and executed on 8 January 215. (Note: According to Liu Xie's biography in Book of the Later Han, Empress Fu was executed on the dingmao day of the 11th month of Jian'an 19. This corresponds to 8 Jan 215 in the proleptic Gregorian calendar.) About two months later, on 6 March 215, (Note: According to Liu Xie's biography in Book of the Later Han, Lady Cao was made empress on the jiazi day of the 1st month of Jian'an 20. This corresponds to 6 Mar 215 in the proleptic Gregorian calendar.) Cao Jie was named Empress to replace her.

== As empress ==
Not much is known about Empress Cao's life as empress, but it was clear that by that point her husband was thoroughly powerless, as her father held all power.

Although Empress Cao was under pressure from her father so that she could enjoy such a noble position to favor the Cao clan, she seemed to be quite loyal to the Han family; in fact, demonstrating this loyalty by being the last stand when her half-brother, Cao Pi, brought an end to the Han dynasty.

In March 220, her father died, and her brother Cao Pi succeeded him as the King of Wei. Later that year, he forced Emperor Xian to abdicate in favour of him, ending the Han dynasty.

It is said by traditional historians that Empress Cao disagreed with Cao Pi's plan to depose the Han dynasty in order to take the throne for himself. As Cao Pi sent messengers to demand that Empress Cao surrender the imperial seal, she refused several times. Finally, under increasing pressure, Empress Cao relented, but she angrily threw the seal to the ground and said: "The Heavens will not give you people any blessing!" Those present did not dare to raise their heads to look at her. (Note: In his Zizhi Tongjian Kaoyi, Sima Guang was skeptical of this account. He felt that this account was a rehash of events surrounding Wang Zhengjun when her nephew Wang Mang usurped the Han throne. Moreover, there was no reason why Empress Cao would be holding onto the imperial seal.)

== As Duchess of Shanyang ==
After abdication, the former Emperor Xian was demoted to the Duke of Shanyang. Hence, the former empress Cao was given the title the Duchess of Shanyang.

It was said that when arriving at Shanyang and witness the poverty and misfortune of the war-torn region, the newly appointed Duke and Duchess decided to use their resources and wealth - including the medicine knowledge learnt in the imperial palace - to support and to cure the local people. They also wore only humble and coarse clothes when paying visits to the inhabitants. Thanks to the couple's efforts, Shanyang region finally became prosperous, and the local population paid luxurious tributes to the Duke and Duchess as a token of gratitude. Later, the Duke and Duchess of Shanyang was named as "Medicine family of Dragon and Phoenix" (龍鳳醫傢). Today, there is still a painting of "Emperor Xian practicing medicine to save the people" (汉献帝行医图).

Her husband died in April 234. She died 26 years later and was buried with him with honours befitting an empress, using Han ceremonies.

== In the novel Romance of the Three Kingdoms ==
Cao Jie in the historical novel Romance of the Three Kingdoms was depicted quite close to her historical records. After the death of Empress Fu, Cao Jie was named Empress to replace her.

In Chapter 80, Empress Cao was angered when knowing that Cao Pi's subordinates demanded Emperor Xian to abdicate in favour of Cao Pi. Later as the armed Cao Hong and Cao Xiu rushed to the palace searching for Emperor Xian, an enraged Empress Cao shouted: "You dishonest rebels ! My father [Cao Cao] overshadowed the whole land, yet he never dared to aspire the sacred throne. But my elder brother who had just only succeeded him, set no bounds to his ambition and would usurp the Throne. The Heavens will not give him any blessing !"

Mao Zonggang in his comments praised the loyalty of the character empress Cao, and considered her a heroine similar to Empress Fu and Consort Dong.

== See also ==
- Cao Wei family trees#Cao Cao's other wives and children
- Lists of people of the Three Kingdoms

== Notes ==
Chinese royalty
Preceded by Empress Fu Shou	Empress of Eastern Han Dynasty; 215–220	Dynasty destroyed
Preceded by Empress Fu Shou	Empress of China (Northern/Central); 215–220	Succeeded by Empress Guo Nüwang of Cao Wei
Preceded by Empress Fu Shou	Empress of China (Southwestern); 215–220	Succeeded by Empress Wu of Shu Han
Preceded by Empress Fu Shou	Empress of China (Southeastern); 215–220	Succeeded by Empress Pan of Eastern Wu
