= Cao Gong =

Prince of Qinghe and son of Cao Pi (died 223)

Cao Gong 曹貢

Prince of Qinghe (清河王)
- Tenure: 222–223
- Born: Unknown
- Died: 223
Names
- Family name: Cao (曹); Given name: Gong (貢)
Posthumous name
- Prince Dao (悼王)
- House: House of Cao
- Father: Cao Pi
- Mother: Consort Zhang

Cao Gong (died 223) was a prince in the state of Cao Wei in the Three Kingdoms period of China. He was a son of Cao Pi (Emperor Wen), the founding emperor of Cao Wei. His mother, Consort Zhang (張姬), was a concubine of Cao Pi. He was enfeoffed as the Prince of Qinghe (清河王) in 222. After his death in the following year, his princedom was abolished because he had no son to inherit it.

== See also ==
- Cao Wei family trees#Consorts Li, Su, Zhang, and Song
- Lists of people of the Three Kingdoms
