= Cao Jian =

Son of Cao Pi and Prince of Dongwuyang (died 225/6)

Cao Jian 曹鑒

Prince of Dongwuyang (東武陽王)
- Tenure: August / September 225 – December 225 / January 226
- Born: Unknown
- Died: December 225 or January 226
Names
- Family name: Cao (曹); Given name: Jian (鑒)
Posthumous name
- Prince Huai (懷王)
- House: House of Cao
- Father: Cao Pi
- Mother: Lady Zhu

Cao Jian (died December 225 or January 226) (Note: Cao Pi's biography in the Sanguozhi recorded that Cao Jian died in the 11th month of the 6th year of the Huangchu era of Cao Pi's reign. This month corresponds to 18 December 225 to 15 January 226 in the Gregorian calendar.) was a prince in the state of Cao Wei in the Three Kingdoms period of China. He was a son of Cao Pi, the first emperor of Wei. His mother, whose maiden family name was Zhu (朱), was a concubine of Cao Pi holding the rank of shuyuan (淑媛; translated "Decent Concubine"). He was enfeoffed as the Prince of Dongwuyang (東武陽王) in August or September 225, but died some months later in December 225 or January 226. In 235, he was given the posthumous title "Prince Huai" (懷王). His princedom was abolished because he had no son to inherit it.

== See also ==
- Cao Wei family trees#Ladies Pan, Zhu, and Qiu
- Lists of people of the Three Kingdoms
