= Cao Mai =

Prince of Chenliu

Cao Mai (traditional Chinese: 曹勱; simplified Chinese: 曹劢; Pinyin: Cáo Mài; died 1 December 358) was the Prince of Chenliu, the second known holder of that title during the Jin dynasty. A great-great grandson of Cao Cao, a warlord and regent of the late Eastern Han dynasty period of Chinese history, he was given the title Prince of Chenliu in the winter of 326 during the reign of Emperor Cheng of Jin, as recorded in the official history Book of Jin. The first Prince of Chenliu was Cao Huan (246-302), the final emperor of the Cao Wei dynasty of Three Kingdom period who was given the title after having been deposed by Sima Yan, Emperor Wu of Jin. The successor of Cao Huan has not been recorded, making Cao Mai the second known bearer of that title during the Jin dynasty, and the first holder during the Eastern Jin dynasty.

Cao Mai died on 1 December 358 during the reign of Emperor Mu of Jin, and was succeeded on 24 November 363 by his son, Cao Hui, during the reign of Emperor Ai of Jin.
