= Prince of Chenliu =

Prince or King of Chenliu (陳留王) was a princely Chinese title during the Han dynasty and its successor states, ending in 479. It has been borne by:

- Emperor Xian of Han, who would go on to become the final emperor of the Han dynasty
- Cao Huan, being the title conferred upon him after his abdication as the last Emperor of Cao Wei in favor of Sima Yan's Jin dynasty
- Cao Mai, who held the position from 326 until his death in 358
- Cao Hui (Prince of Chenliu), who held the position from 363 until his death in 378; son of Cao Mai
