= Gaotang Long =

Cao Wei official (died 237)

Gaotang Long (Chinese: 高堂隆, died 237), courtesy name Shengping (Chinese: 升平), was an official serving in the state of Cao Wei. He was from Pingyang, Taishan Commandery (modern-day Xintai, Shandong). He was known for his expertise in astrology.

In about 210, the Administrator of Taishan Commandery, Xie Ti (薛悌), appointed Gaotang Long as Investigator (督郵). In 213, Gaotang Long was appointed Imperial Chancellor as an advisory role in Cao Cao's staff. In 217, he became a Literary Scholar (文學) in Cao Hui's household. When Cao Cao died in 220, Cao Hui failed to show appropriate grief and instead did hunting and horse-racing. Gaotang Long brought him to order. Then, he became Chancellor of his county marquisate.

When Cao Pi came to power, Gaotang Long was made magistrate of the district of Tangyang (堂陽), and was soon made Tutor to Cao Rui. When Cao Rui became emperor, he was promoted to magistrate of Chenliu Commandery, then Cavalier attendant-in-ordinary (散騎常侍), and was given the title of Marquis within the Passes (關內侯). Later on, he would become palace attendant (侍中), then Grand Astronomer (太史令). As Grand Astronomer, he presented the Huangchu calendar (黄初) with the help of his assistant Han Yi. Later, Gaotang Long became Chamberlain for Attendants (光祿勳).

He was a descendant of Han dynasty Confucian scholar Gaotang Sheng.
