= Cao Gan =

Prince of the state of Cao Wei (214–261)

Cao Gan / Cao Liang 曹幹 / 曹良

Prince of Zhao (趙王)
- Tenure: 232 – 14 September 261

Prince of Julu (鉅鹿王)
- Tenure: 226–232

Prince of Lecheng (樂城王)
- Tenure: 224–226

Prince of Hejian (河間王)
- Tenure: 222–224

Duke of Yan (燕公)
- Tenure: 221–222
- Born: 214 (Note: The Weilue mentioned that Cao Gan was five years old (by East Asian age reckoning) when Cao Cao died in 220, so by this account, Cao Gan's birth year was 216. However, Pei Songzhi pointed out that Cao Gan was 20 years younger (by East Asian age reckoning) than Cao Biao. Since Cao Biao was born in 195, Cao Gan must be born in 214. The 214 birth year makes more sense than the 216 birth year because, according to the Sanguozhi, Cao Gan was enfeoffed as a marquis in 215, thus he could not have been born in 216.)
- Died: 14 September 261 (aged 47) (Note: The Sanguozhi stated that Cao Gan died on the wuyin (戊寅) day of the 8th month in the 2nd year of the Jingyuan era (260-264) in Cao Huan's reign. This date corresponds to 14 September 261 in the Gregorian calendar.)
Names
- Family name: Cao (曹); Given name: Gan/Liang (幹/良)
- House: House of Cao
- Father: Cao Cao
- Mother: Lady Chen

Cao Gan (214 – 14 September 261), also known as Cao Liang, (Note: The Weilue recorded his name as "Cao Liang" instead of "Cao Gan".) was an imperial prince of the state of Cao Wei in the Three Kingdoms period of China.

== Life ==
Cao Gan was a son of Cao Cao, a warlord who rose to prominence towards the end of the Han dynasty and laid the foundation for the Cao Wei state. His birth mother was Lady Chen (陳妾), a concubine of Cao Cao, but he was raised by Lady Wang (王夫人), another of Cao Cao's concubines, because Lady Chen died early.

In 215, Cao Gan was enfeoffed as the "Marquis of Gaoping Village" (高平亭侯) by Emperor Xian, the figurehead emperor of the Han dynasty. In 217, his title was first changed to "Marquis of Lai Village" (賴亭侯) and then to "Marquis of Hongnong" (弘農侯) within the same year. When Cao Cao was critically ill in early 220, he told his heir apparent Cao Pi, "This boy was only three years old when his mother died. Now, he's going to lose his father too when he's just five years old. Please take good care of him." Cao Pi followed his father's dying wish and treated Cao Gan and his other half-brothers kindly. The young Cao Gan often called Cao Pi "aweng" (阿翁; an affectionate way of addressing one's father, grandfather or an older man) but Cao Pi corrected him, "I am your elder brother." Cao Pi was often moved to tears when he saw how Cao Gan looked up to him like a father.

In 220, Cao Pi usurped the throne from Emperor Xian, ended the Han dynasty, and established the Cao Wei state with himself as the new emperor. A year later, he enfeoffed his half-brother Cao Gan as the Duke of Yan (燕公). In 222, he promoted Cao Gan from a duke to a prince under the title "Prince of Hejian" (河間王). Cao Gan's title was later changed to "Prince of Lecheng" (樂城王) in 224, and then to "Prince of Julu" (鉅鹿王) in 226.

In 232, Cao Pi's successor, Cao Rui, changed Cao Gan's title to "Prince of Zhao" (趙王). In 234, someone reported Cao Gan to the imperial court for violating imperial protocol by privately hosting guests without authorisation. Although Cao Rui did not punish Cao Gan for the infringement, he issued an imperial decree to reprimand Cao Gan for his conduct.

Throughout the later reign of Cao Rui to the reigns of the subsequent Wei emperors (Cao Fang and Cao Huan), the number of taxable households in Cao Gan's princedom increased until it reached 5,000. Cao Gan died on 14 September 261 during the reign of Cao Huan, the last Wei emperor.

== See also ==
- Cao Wei family trees#Cao Cao's other wives and children
- Lists of people of the Three Kingdoms
