= Cao Ju (Prince of Fanyang) =

Son of Chinese warlord Cao Cao

Cao Ju 曹矩

Prince of Fanyang (范陽王) (posthumous)
- Successor: Cao Min

Duke of Fanyang (范陽公) (posthumous)
- Born: Unknown
- Died: Unknown
Names
- Family name: Cao (曹); Given name: Ju (矩)
Posthumous name
- Prince Min (閔王)
- House: House of Cao
- Father: Cao Cao
- Mother: Consort Yin

Cao Ju (birth and death dates unknown) was a son of Cao Cao, a warlord who rose to power in the late Eastern Han dynasty and laid the foundation for the state of Cao Wei in the Three Kingdoms period of China. His mother was Lady Yin (尹夫人), a concubine of Cao Cao; Cao Ju was also the maternal half-brother of He Yan. He died young and had no son to succeed him.

In 217, Cao Min (曹敏), a son of Cao Ju's half-brother Cao Jun, was designated as Cao Ju's heir and was enfeoffed as the Marquis of Linjin (臨晉侯). In 222, Cao Ju's half-brother Cao Pi, who became the first emperor of the Cao Wei state, honoured Cao Ju with the posthumous title "Duke Min of Fanyang" (范陽閔公). In 224, he promoted Cao Min from a duke to a prince under the title "Prince of Fanyang" (范陽王). In 226, Cao Min's title was changed to "Prince of Juyang" (句陽王). In 232, Cao Pi's successor Cao Rui honoured Cao Ju with a new posthumous title: "Prince Min of Fanyang" (范陽閔王); he also changed Cao Min's title to "Prince of Langya" (琅邪王). Throughout the reigns of the subsequent Wei emperors, the number of taxable households in Cao Min's dukedom increased until it reached 3,400. After Cao Min died, he was posthumously honoured as "Prince Yuan (of Langya)" (原王) and was succeeded by his son Cao Kun (曹焜).

Another son of Cao Min, Cao Zan (曹贊), was made heir of Cao Rui (Prince of Beihai).

== See also ==
- Cao Wei family trees#Lady Yin
- Lists of people of the Three Kingdoms
