= Liu Man (Princess Changle) =

Liu Man 劉曼
- Princess Changle (長樂郡公主)
- House: House of Liu
- Dynasty: Han Dynasty
- Father: Emperor Xian of Han
- Mother: Empress Cao

Liu Man (劉曼) (fl.220–224) was a Chinese Imperial princess of the Han dynasty during the Three Kingdoms period. She was the daughter of the last emperor of Han, Emperor Xian and Cao Jie. She was given the title of Princess of Changle Commandary(長樂郡公主) by Emperor Cao Pi of the state of Cao Wei.

== Biography ==
There are no historical records about Liu Man's birth and death. She was an imperial princess of the House of Liu, being the daughter of the 14th, and last, emperor of the Han Dynasty, Liu Xian. Liu Man's mother was Cao Jie, daughter of Cao Cao, the imperial counsellor and King of Wei.

In March 220, Cao Cao died and his son Cao Pi succeeded him. In late 220, Cao Pi initiated a coup d'état against Emperor Xian. Empress Cao Jie was Cao Pi's half-sister. She tried on her own to defend the imperial seal and the legitimate government of Han, but after many attempts she was forced to surrender when soldiers under Cao Pi's command invaded the Imperial palace, leading to the eventual end of the Han dynasty. After the incident, Cao Pi established the state of Cao Wei and became emperor. He demoted Emperor Xian to the Duke of Shanyang and Empress Cao Jie to the Duchess of Shanyang, and canonized Liu Man with the title of Princess of Changle Commandary on 20 January 224.

== Sources ==
- Chen, Shou (3rd century). Records of the Three Kingdoms (Sanguozhi).
