= Fu Shou =

Empress of China from 195 to 215

Fu Shou 伏壽
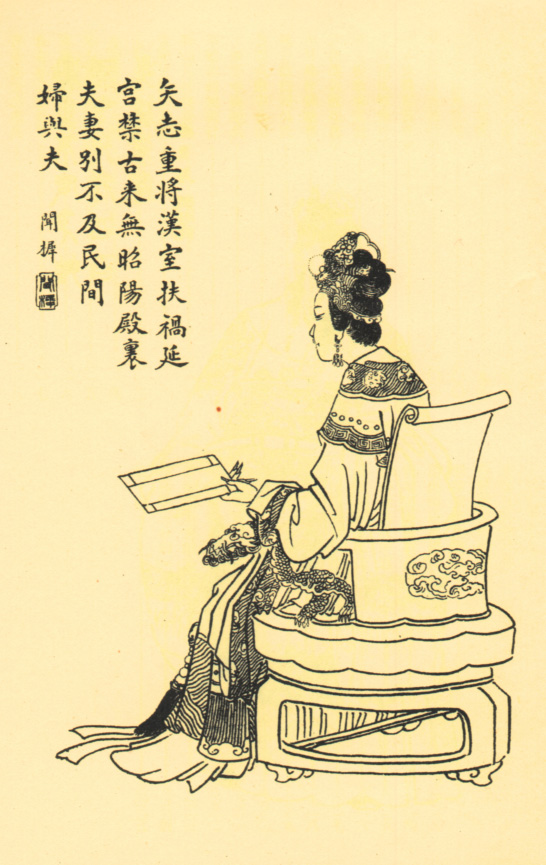
- Illustration after an illustrated edition of Romance of the Three Kingdoms, c. 1890

Empress consort of the Han dynasty
- Tenure: 20 May 195 – 8 January 215
- Predecessor: Empress Lingsi
- Successor: Empress Xianmu
- Born: Unknown
- Died: 8 Jan 215
- Spouse: Emperor Xian
- Issue: Liu Feng, Prince of Nanyang two other sons
- Father: Fu Wan, Marquis of Buqi
- Mother: Ying

Fu Shou (died 8 January 215 (Note: According to Liu Xie's biography in Book of the Later Han, Empress Fu was executed on the dingmao day of the 11th month of Jian'an 19. This corresponds to 8 Jan 215 in the Julian calendar.)) was an empress of the Eastern Han dynasty of China. She was the first wife of Emperor Xian, the last Han emperor. She is best known for initiating a conspiracy against Cao Cao, regent of Emperor Xian and Duke of Wei.

Empress Fu Shou is praised in the traditional point of view as one of the last defenders of the failed Han dynasty, alongside Lady Dong and Empress Xianmu in contrast to Emperor Xian's negligence.

== Family background and marriage to Emperor Xian ==
Fu Shou's father was Fu Wan (伏完), a seventh generation descendant of the early Eastern Han official Fu Zhan (伏湛) and the hereditary Marquis of Buqi (不其侯). Fu Wan's wife was Princess Yang'an (陽安公主), a daughter of Emperor Huan, but she was not Fu Shou's biological mother as Fu Shou's mother was named Ying (盈). Fu Wan also had a wife with the family name Fan (樊), but it is not clear whether she was Ying. The Fu family descended from the prominent Confucian scholar Fu Sheng.

In 190, as Emperor Xian was being forced by Dong Zhuo to move the capital west to Chang'an, Lady Fu became an imperial consort. On 20 May 195, while Emperor Xian was largely under the control of Dong Zhuo's subordinates Li Jue and Guo Si, he designated Fu Shou as his empress consort.

== As empress ==
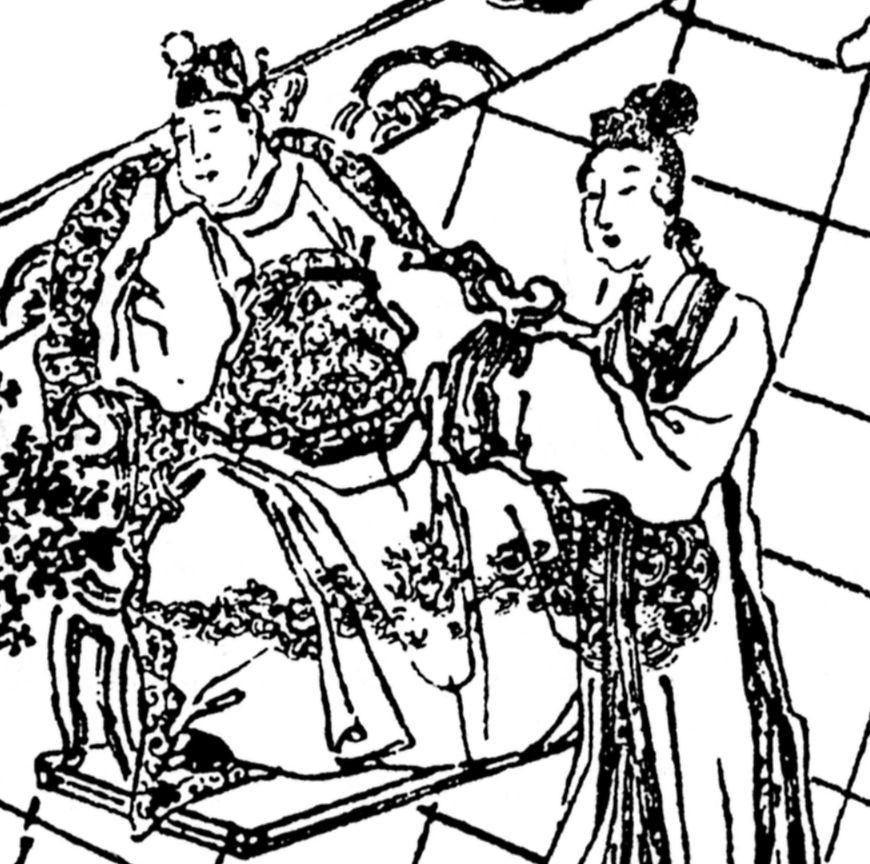
A Qing dynasty illustration of Empress Fu Shou (right) and Emperor Xian

As Emperor Xian continued his reign of being constantly under the control of one warlord or another, he and Empress Fu were apparently in a loving relationship, but both saw their power increasingly becoming minimal. Later in 195, during Emperor Xian's flight back to the old capital Luoyang, Empress Fu was carrying silk, which were seized by soldiers ostensibly protecting her – such that even her own personal bodyguards were killed, and their blood spilled on her. When they returned to Luoyang, the imperial court was poorly supplied and while there is no record indicating that Empress Fu personally was under threat of starvation, a number of imperial officials died of hunger or were killed by robbers. Materially, the imperial court became much better supplied once the warlord Cao Cao arrived in 196 and took Emperor Xian and the imperial court under control. Cao Cao relocated the imperial capital to his headquarters in Xu County (present-day Xuchang, Henan).

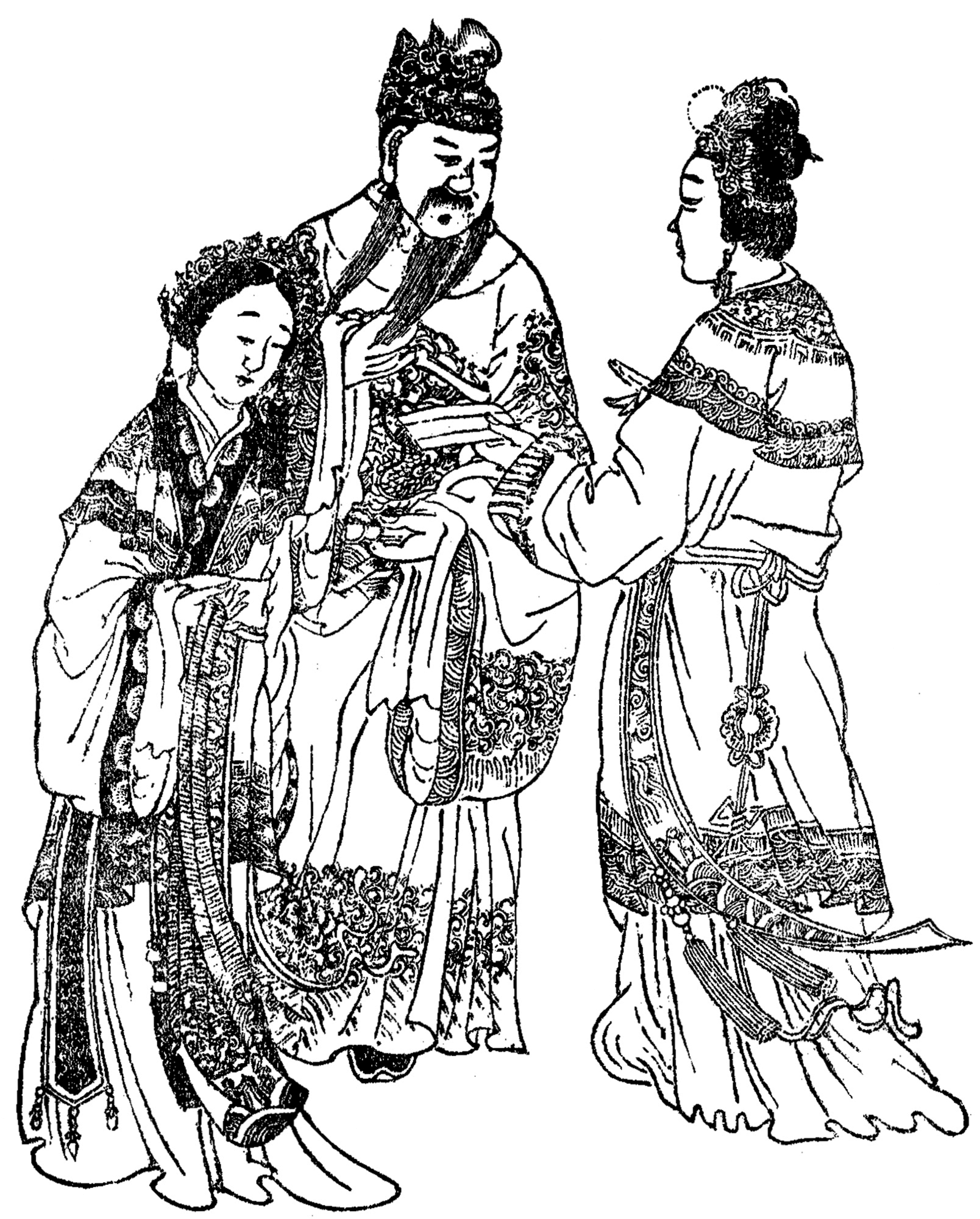
Illustration of Concubine Dong, Emperor Xian and Empress Fu

Empress Fu was apparently not happy about Cao Cao's domination over the imperial court and central government. In February 200, Emperor Xian's concubine, Consort Dong, was forcibly executed by Cao Cao against the emperor's wishes after her father Dong Cheng was found guilty of masterminding a conspiracy to assassinate Cao Cao. After Consort Dong's death, Empress Fu became angry and fearful, so she wrote her father Fu Wan a letter accusing Cao Cao of cruelty and implicitly asking him to come up with a plan to eliminate Cao Cao. Fu Wan was fearful and did not act on the letter, but Empress Fu's letter was discovered in late 214. Cao Cao was so angry that he forced Emperor Xian to depose Empress Fu. When Emperor Xian was reluctant to do so, Cao Cao sent Hua Xin and close aides into the imperial palace to capture the empress. Empress Fu tried to hide behind a wall, but Cao Cao's men found her and dragged her out. As she was being taken away, she cried out to Emperor Xian to save her, but his only response was that he had no idea what would happen to him. She was incarcerated and killed along with her two sons (Note: Liu Feng had predeceased his mother, on 9 August 200. According to the Zizhi Tongjian, Liu Feng died on the renwu day of the 7th month of the 5th year of the Jian'an Era of his father's reign. This corresponds to 9 Aug 200 on the Julian calendar.) and more than 100 members of the Fu clan; her mother Lady Ying and 18 others were exiled.

== Anecdotes ==
According to Chronicles of the Emperor Xian (献帝春秋; Xiandi Chunqiu), after Fu Wan had written a letter, he entrusted it to Xun Yu and his brother-in-law Fan Pu. Fan Pu presented it to Cao Cao, which raised concerns for Xun Yu, fearing that it might bring trouble to himself. Xun Yu advised Cao Cao to marry his daughter to Emperor Xian. During the discussion between Cao Cao and Xun Yu on this matter, Xun Yu mentioned, "Empress Fu has no child." However, Pei Songzhi, when annotating Xun Yu's biography in vol.10 of Records of the Three Kingdoms, questioned the logic of Xun Yu's statement in this account. Due to the credibility issues with this entire passage, it is uncertain whether Empress Fu indeed had two children who were poisoned, and the birth dates of these two children may not necessarily be after Fu Wan's conspiracy.

== Appraisal ==
Republic of China historian Lü Simian had a different perspective on the case of Empress Fu's execution. He believed that given Cao Cao's status and temperament, he wouldn't simply harm Empress Fu because of a disrespectful letter she sent to her father. Furthermore, Emperor Xian would not have transferred his anger to Cao Cao just because of Dong Cheng's assassination (Dong Cheng himself wasn't a trustworthy loyalist). Lu Simian thought that there must have been "another reason" behind this case, something significant and not suitable for inclusion in official history records. He speculated that Empress Fu had a comprehensive political plan that was crucial to the overall situation, and therefore, Cao Cao had no choice but to take action.

== In Romance of the Three Kingdoms ==
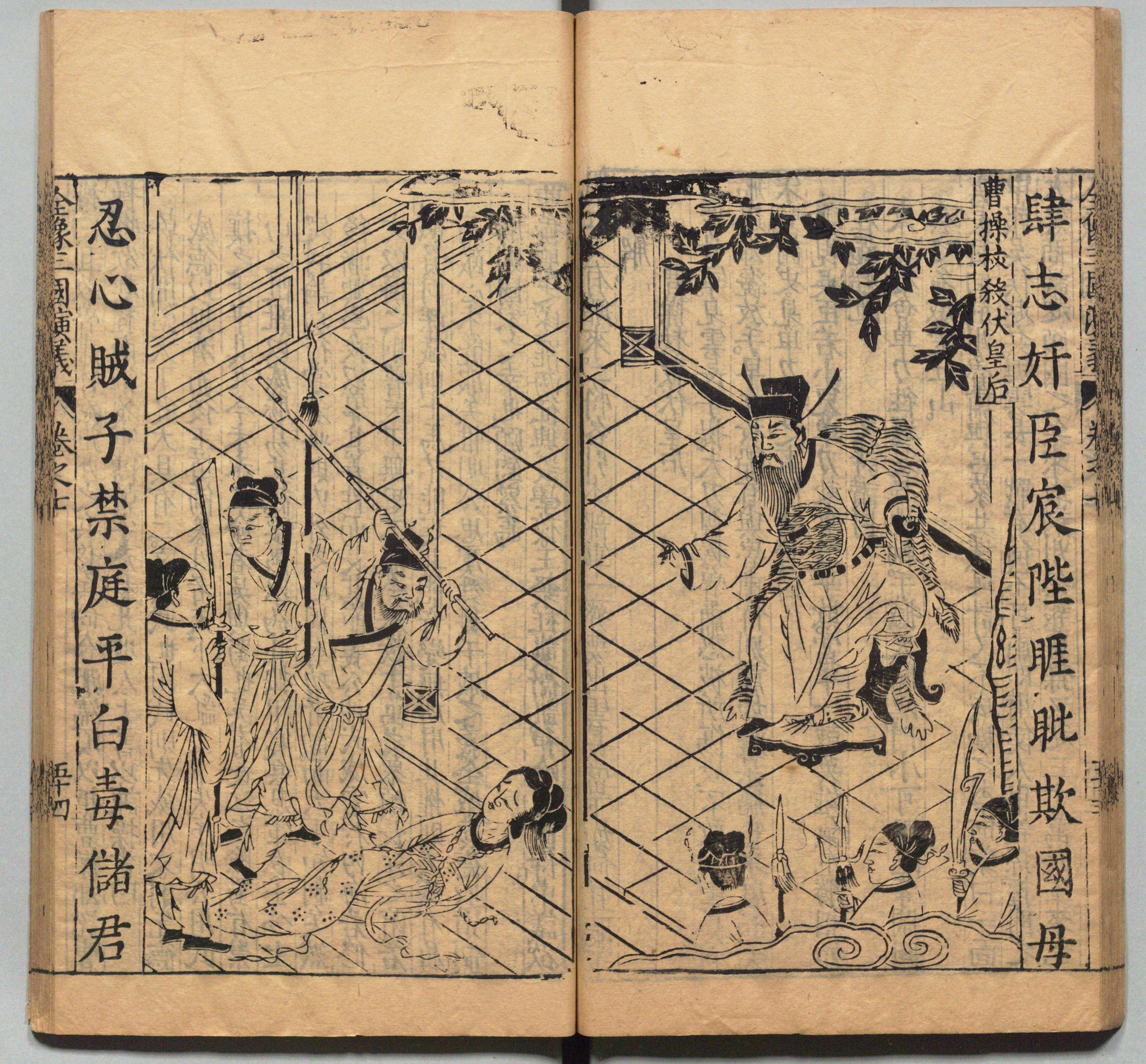
Illustration from a 1591 edition of the novel: "Cao Cao and Empress Fu" which depicts Cao Cao ordering Empress Fu to be beaten to death after her assassination plot was exposed.

Empress Fu's execution was depicted in chapter 66 of Romance of the Three Kingdoms, a 14th-century historical novel by Luo Guanzhong. When Emperor Xian and Empress Fu were told that Cao Cao, might soon aspire to the throne, they conceived a plan to assassinate him. The Empress said that her father, Fu Wan, had long desired to do it. Knowing the misery resulting from the previous attempt by Dong Cheng, they selected their most trusted attendant, Mu Shun, to deliver the message to Fu Wan. Mu Shun agreed to be the courier, hid the message in his hair, and successfully delivered it. Fu Wan noted that success would require coordination with the armies of Liu Bei and Sun Quan with loyalists inside the capital and wrote a reply to that effect. Somehow Cao Cao learned of the meeting. He stopped Mu Shun at the gate and found the reply. The first message was then found in Fu Wan's residence. When soldiers were sent to arrest her, the empress hid in a hollow wall. However, Hua Xin, the imperial secretary, found her and pulled her out by her hair. She was dragged before Cao Cao who ordered her beaten to death and her two sons poisoned. He then made the emperor elevate his daughter to empress.

== See also ==
- Lists of people of the Three Kingdoms

== Notes ==
Chinese royalty
Preceded by Empress He	Empress of the Han dynasty 195–214	Succeeded by Empress Cao Jie
