= Princess Linfen =

Princess Linfen (臨汾公主) was a Chinese Imperial princess of the Cao Wei state during the Three Kingdoms period (220-280 AD). Her parentage is not recorded. Although few records exist of her life, the most notable mention of her is her involvement in an incident involving the Rituals for the God of River Wujian.

== Incident ==
During the reign of Cao Pi (posthumously known as Emperor Wen of Wei), an incident occurred involving Princess Linfen. The controversy arose when the wet nurse of Cao Hong and servants of Princess Linfen conducted a ritual in honor of the River God Wujian. Their actions led to their imprisonment by Sima Zhi. Empress Dowager Bian dispatched a eunuch to deliver her command for leniency on behalf of the imprisoned women. However, Sima Zhi, in defiance of the Empress dowager's order, ordered the women to be tortured to death in Luoyang Prison.

Sima Zhi then submitted a memorial stating:

"All those deserving the death penalty should be reported and await the emperor's decision. Previously, the emperor issued a decree to prohibit licentious rituals to uphold propriety. These criminals' sinister acts have only recently been exposed during questioning. Eunuch Wu Da came to me, conveying a message from the Empress Dowager. I dared not receive him, fearing that there might be intentions to protect the offenders. Once the emperor hears of this, he may be compelled to issue orders for their protection. It is entirely my fault for not promptly concluding this matter, and I have violated the usual procedures. Therefore, I ordered Luoyang County to execute them. I acted on my own in implementing the punishment, and I await the emperor's judgment."

Emperor Wen of Wei personally responded, saying, "After reading your memorial, I understand your sincere intention to carry out the decree to prohibit licentious rituals. You have acted appropriately! This is your commitment to following the decree, so there is nothing to apologize for. In the future, if a eunuch from the palace comes to you, never receive them.". Later, Emperor Wen of Wei rewarded Sima Zhi with the title of Marquis of Guannei.

== Sources ==
- Annotated Records of the Three Kingdoms by Pei Songzhi, Volume 12: Book of Wei, Volume 12: Emperor Ming.
