= Cao Chong =

Chinese warlord Cao Cao's son (196–208)

Cao Chong 曹沖
- Born: 196 (Note: The Sanguozhi recorded that Cao Chong died in the 13th year of the Jian'an era (196-220) in the reign of Emperor Xian of Han. He was 13 years old (by East Asian age reckoning) when he died. By calculation, Cao Chong's birth year should be around 196.)
- Died: 208 (aged 12)
Names
- Family name: Cao (曹); Given name: Chong (沖); Courtesy name: Cangshu (倉舒)
Posthumous name
- Prince Ai (哀王)
- House: House of Cao
- Father: Cao Cao
- Mother: Consort Huan

Cao Chong (196–208), courtesy name Cangshu, was a son of Cao Cao, a warlord who rose to power towards the end of the Han dynasty and laid the foundation of the state of Cao Wei in the Three Kingdoms period of China. A child prodigy, Cao Chong is best known for his ingenious method of weighing an elephant using the principle of buoyancy. He was considered by his father as a possible successor but died prematurely at the age of 12.

== Family background ==
Cao Chong was the eldest son of Cao Cao and his concubine Lady Huan (環夫人). He had two younger brothers: Cao Ju and Cao Yu. He was a child prodigy and, according to the Records of the Three Kingdoms, "possessed the intelligence of an adult" when he was around the age of five.

== Principle of buoyancy ==
On one occasion, the southern warlord Sun Quan sent an elephant as a gift to Cao Cao. Cao Cao wanted to know the animal's weight so he asked his subordinates but no one could think of a method to measure the elephant's weight. Cao Chong said, "Place the elephant on a boat and mark the water level. Then replace the elephant with other objects until the boat is submerged to the same level. The weight of the elephant can be found by summing up the weights of all the objects." Cao Cao was delighted and he had Cao Chong's idea implemented.

According to Joseph Needham, although no official treatise in the likes of Archimedes' principle was ever written regarding buoyancy in ancient China, there were observational precedents of it in the Rites of Zhou, compiled and edited in the early Han dynasty (202 BCE–220 CE). Needham states:

Empirical use, of course, was made of [Archimedes'] principle, as in the floating of arrows and vehicle wheels in water by the [Zhou] and Han technicians, in order to determine their equilibrium and add or remove material accordingly.

== Rodents incident ==
In another incident, Cao Cao's saddle was chewed by rodents when it was kept in a store. The storekeepers feared for their lives because the laws were very harsh during those times of war, so they planned to tie themselves up and admit their mistake to Cao Cao in the hope of receiving a lenient punishment. Cao Chong told them, "Wait for three days before reporting the incident." He used a knife to cut holes in his clothes, making it seem as though they had been damaged by rats, and then pretended to look upset. When his father asked him, he replied, "There is a saying that a person whose clothes have been chewed by rats will encounter ill luck. Now, as this has happened to me, I fear something might happen." Cao Cao said, "This is just a superstition. There's nothing to worry about." When the storekeepers reported the saddle incident to Cao Cao three days later, Cao Cao laughed and said, "My son's clothes were with him, yet they were still chewed by rats, so it is not surprising that my saddle in the store was also damaged." He did not pursue the matter.

== Favoured by his father ==
Cao Chong was known to be kind and understanding. He helped to review cases of indicted criminals for any injustice and successfully cleared tens of cases. When some hardworking officials landed themselves in trouble for making minor lapses, Cao Chong spoke up for them and managed to persuade his father to pardon them.

Cao Chong's intelligence and compassionate attitude, coupled with his beautiful looks, made him very outstanding among his brothers and earned him the favor of his father. Cao Cao often praised Cao Chong in front of his subordinates and had the intention of making Cao Chong his heir apparent.

== Death and succession ==
Cao Chong became seriously ill when he was 12 and died. Cao Cao was extremely grieved. When Cao Chong's older half-brother Cao Pi came to console his father, Cao Cao remarked, "Cao Chong's death is my misfortune, but it is to the advantage of you and your brothers."

Cao Cao shed tears whenever Cao Chong was mentioned. He had Cao Chong buried together with a deceased woman from a certain Zhen (甄) family and posthumously granted his son the appointment Cavalry Commandant (騎都尉). Cao Cong (曹琮), the Marquis of Wan (宛侯) and a son of Cao Chong's younger brother Cao Ju, was designated Cao Chong's heir. In 217, Cao Cong was enfeoffed as the Marquis of Deng (鄧侯).

In 221, after Cao Pi established the state of Cao Wei, he granted Cao Chong the posthumous title "Marquis Ai of Deng" (鄧哀侯) but elevated him to the status of a duke later, so Cao Chong became known as "Duke Ai of Deng" (鄧哀公). In 231, during the reign of Cao Pi's son Cao Rui, Cao Chong was posthumously honoured as "Prince Ai of Deng" (鄧哀王). Cao Pi once said, "My elder brother (Cao Ang) was a xiaolian and had the right to the succession. If Cangshu was around, I'd not have been able to obtain the empire."

== See also ==
- Cao Wei family trees#Lady Huan
- Lists of people of the Three Kingdoms
