= Cao Yu (Three Kingdoms) =

Prince of the state of Cao Wei (died 278)

Cao Yu 曹宇

Duke of Yan (燕公)
- Tenure: February 266–278?

Prince of Yan (燕王)
- Tenure: 232 – February 266
- Born: between 196 and 211 (Note: Cao Yu's full brother Cao Chong was born in 196.)
- Died: 278 (aged between 67 and 82)
- Consorts: Lady Zhang, daughter of Zhang Lu
- Issue: Cao Huan
Names
- Family name: Cao (曹); Given name: Yu (宇); Courtesy name: Pengzu (彭祖)
- House: House of Cao
- Father: Cao Cao
- Mother: Consort Huan

Cao Yu (before 211–278), courtesy name Pengzu, was a prince of the state of Cao Wei during the Three Kingdoms period of China. He was a son of Cao Cao, a warlord who rose to power towards the end of the Han dynasty and laid the foundation of Wei. Cao Yu's son, Cao Huan, was the fifth and last emperor of Wei.

== Life ==
Cao Yu was a son of Cao Cao and his concubine Lady Huan (環夫人). He had two elder brothers who were also born to Lady Huan – Cao Chong and Cao Ju (曹據). He was enfeoffed as a Marquis of a Chief District (都鄉侯) in 211 during the reign of Emperor Xian in the Eastern Han dynasty. In 215, after the warlord Zhang Lu surrendered to his father Cao Cao, Cao Cao married one of Zhang's daughters to Cao Yu. Cao Yu was later promoted to a county marquis under the title "Marquis of Luyang" (魯陽侯) in 217.

In 221, the year after Cao Yu's elder half-brother, Cao Pi, ended the Han dynasty and established the state of Cao Wei, Cao Yu became a duke, and was enfeoffed as the Prince of Xiapi (下邳王) in the following year. In 224, his princedom was changed from Xiapi (下邳; present-day Pizhou, Jiangsu) to Shanfu County (單父縣; present-day Shan County, Shandong).

In 232, during the reign of Cao Rui (Cao Pi's son and successor), Cao Yu's title was changed to "Prince of Yan" (燕王). Cao Rui had been very close to Cao Yu in his childhood and he favoured the latter, so he treated Cao Yu exceptionally after ascending the throne in 226 upon his father's death. In 235, Cao Yu was summoned to serve in the Wei imperial court. He returned to Ye (鄴; in present-day Handan, Hebei) in 237, but was summoned back to the Wei capital Luoyang in the summer of 238. Cao Rui became seriously ill in the winter of 238–239 and he appointed Cao Yu as General-in-Chief (大將軍) in the hope that Cao Yu would assist his successor in governing the state. After serving as General-in-Chief for a few days, Cao Yu had the intention of resigning. At the same time, Cao Rui had also changed his mind so he relieved Cao Yu of his duty. Cao Yu returned to Ye in the summer of 239 after Cao Rui's death.

In 260, after the fourth Wei ruler Cao Mao was killed in a failed coup against the regent Sima Zhao, Cao Yu's son Cao Huan, the Duke of Changdao District (常道鄉公), was chosen to be the new emperor and he ascended the throne shortly after Cao Mao's death. Cao Yu remained as the Prince of Yan when his son was a nominal emperor under Sima Zhao's control. The number of taxable households in his princedom increased throughout the reigns of Cao Rui, Cao Fang, Cao Mao and Cao Huan until it reached 5,500. On 4 February 266, Sima Zhao's son Sima Yan forced Cao Huan to abdicate the throne in his favour, ending the state of Cao Wei and establishing the Jin dynasty. Sima Yan became the emperor and he granted Cao Huan the title "Prince of Chenliu" (陳留王). Cao Yu's status was reduced from that of a prince to a duke, so he became known as the "Duke of Yan" (燕公); he died in 278.

== Family ==
Consorts and Issue:

- Lady, of the Zhang clan (張氏)
  - Possibly Cao Huan, Emperor Yuan (元皇帝 曹奐; 246–302) (Note: Cao Huan was born about 30 years after Cao Yu's marriage to Lady Zhang. Thus, it is unlikely that Lady Zhang was Huan's mother.)

== See also ==
- Cao Wei family trees
- Lists of people of the Three Kingdoms
