= Cao Xuan (Cao Cao's son) =

Son of Cao Cao and Prince of Jiyang (died c.215)

Cao Xuan 曹玹

Prince of Jiyang (濟陽王) (posthumous)

Duke of Jiyang (濟陽公) (posthumous)

Marquis of Xi District (西鄉侯)
- Tenure: 211 – c. 215
- Successor: Cao Zan
- Born: Unknown
- Died: c. 215
Names
- Family name: Cao (曹); Given name: Xuan (玹)
Posthumous name
- Prince Huai (懷王)
- House: House of Cao
- Father: Cao Cao
- Mother: Consort Qin

Cao Xuan (died c. 215) was a son of Cao Cao, a warlord who rose to power in the late Eastern Han dynasty and laid the foundation for the state of Cao Wei in the Three Kingdoms period of China. His mother was Lady Qin (秦夫人), a concubine of Cao Cao. She also bore Cao Cao another son, Cao Jun. He was enfeoffed as the Marquis of Xi District (西鄉侯) in 211 by Emperor Xian, the last emperor of the Han dynasty. He died sometime before or in 215, and had no son to succeed him.

In 215, Emperor Xian designated Cao Zan (曹贊), a son of Cao Xuan's half-brother Cao Lin, as Cao Xuan's heir. Like Cao Xuan before him, Cao Zan also died early without a son to succeed him. Around 220, after Cao Xuan's half-brother Cao Pi usurped the throne from Emperor Xian and became the first emperor of the Cao Wei state, he designated Cao Zan's younger brother, Cao Yi (曹壹), as Cao Zan's successor. In 221, Cao Yi was enfeoffed as the Marquis of Jiyang (濟陽侯). Two years later, he was promoted from a marquis to a duke under the title "Duke of Jiyang" (濟陽公). In 230, Cao Pi's successor Cao Rui honoured Cao Xuan with the posthumous title "Duke Huai of Jiyang" (濟陽懷公). In 232, he elevated Cao Xuan to the status of a prince, hence Cao Xuan was known posthumously as "Prince Huai of Jiyang" (濟陽懷王). Cao Rui also awarded Cao Zan the posthumous title "Marquis Ai of Xi District" (西鄉哀侯). After Cao Yi died, he was honoured with the posthumous title "Duke Dao" (悼公), and was succeeded by his son Cao Heng (曹恒) as the Duke of Jiyang. Throughout the reigns of the subsequent Wei emperors, the number of taxable households in Cao Heng's dukedom increased until it reached 1,900.

== See also ==
- Cao Wei family trees#Lady Qin
- Lists of people of the Three Kingdoms
