= Cao Jun (Prince of Chenliu) =

Prince of the state of Cao Wei (died 259)

Cao Jun 曹峻

Prince of Chenliu (陳留王)
- Tenure: 232 – August or September 259
- Tenure: 222–224
- Successor: Cao Ao

Prince of Xiangyi (襄邑王)
- Tenure: 224–232

Duke of Xiangyi (襄邑公)
- Tenure: 221–222

Marquis of Xiangyi (襄邑侯)
- Tenure: 217–221

Marquis of Mei (郿侯)
- Tenure: 216–217
- Born: Unknown
- Died: August or September 259 (Note: Cao Mao's biography in the Sanguozhi recorded that Cao Jun died in the 7th month of the 4th year of the Ganlu era of Cao Mao's reign. This month corresponds to 6 August to 3 September 259 in the Gregorian calendar.)
- Issue: Cao Ao
Names
- Family name: Cao (曹); Given name: Jun (峻); Courtesy name: Zi'an (子安)
Posthumous name
- Prince Gong (恭王)
- House: House of Cao
- Father: Cao Cao
- Mother: Consort Qin

Cao Jun (died August or September 259), courtesy name Zi'an, was a prince of the state of Cao Wei in the Three Kingdoms period of China. He was a son of Cao Cao, a warlord who rose to prominence towards the end of the Han dynasty and laid the foundation for the Cao Wei state. His mother was Lady Qin (秦夫人), a concubine of Cao Cao. She also bore Cao Cao another son, Cao Xuan. Cao Jun was enfeoffed as the Marquis of Mei (郿侯) in 216 during the reign of Emperor Xian in the Eastern Han dynasty. His marquisate was changed to Xiangyi County (襄邑縣; present-day Sui County, Shangqiu, Henan) in the following year. In 221, a year after Cao Jun's elder half-brother Cao Pi ended the Han dynasty and established the state of Cao Wei, Cao Jun was promoted from a marquis to a duke. In 222, he received the title "Prince of Chenliu" (陳留王). Two years later, his princedom was changed from Chenliu (陳留; around present-day Kaifeng, Henan) to Xiangyi County. In 232, during the reign of Cao Pi's son Cao Rui, Cao Jun's princedom was relocated back to Chenliu. Cao Jun died in 259 during the reign of Cao Mao.

Cao Jun was succeeded by his son, Cao Ao (曹澳). The number of taxable households in Cao Ao's princedom increased throughout the reigns of the Wei emperors until it reached 4,700.

== See also ==
- Cao Wei family trees#Lady Qin
- Lists of people of the Three Kingdoms
