= Princess Anyang =

Princess Anyang 安陽公主
- Spouse: Xun Yun (荀惲)
- Issue: Xun Han (荀甝); Xun Yi (荀霬)
- House: House of Cao
- Father: Cao Cao

Princess Anyang (安陽公主) was a Chinese princess member of the aristocrat Cao family during the Three Kingdoms period at the end of the Han dynasty. She was the daughter of the warlord Cao Cao, the King of Cao Wei. Her real name is not written in histographies. She received the title of Princess Anyang when the state of Cao Wei was established by her half-brother, Cao Pi.

She married Xun Yu's son, Xun Yun (荀惲), who served as Rapid as Tigers General of the Household. Her husband Xun Yun died at a young age. During their marriage, she gave birth to two sons, Xun Han and Xun Yi. The eldest son, Xun Han, was granted the title of Marquis of Guangyangxiang but died at the age of 30. The youngest, Xun Yi, married Sima Yi's daughter, Princess Nanyang, and served as a general, being posthumously granted title of Marquis of Zhen.

== Sources ==
- Chen, Shou (3rd century). Records of the Three Kingdoms (Sanguozhi), scroll 10.
- Fan, Ye (5th century). Book of the Later Han (Houhanshu).
