= Cao Huan =

Emperor of Cao Wei from 260 to 266

Emperor Yuan of Wei 魏元帝

Emperor of Cao Wei
- Reign: 27 June 260 – 4 February 266
- Predecessor: Cao Mao
- Regent: Sima Zhao; Sima Yan

Duke of Changdao District, Anci County (安次縣常道鄉公)
- Tenure: 256 – 27 June 260

Prince of Chenliu (陳留王)
- Tenure: 4 February 266 – 302
- Born: 246
- Died: 302 (aged 56)
- Consorts: Empress Bian
Names
- Family name: Cao (曹); Given name: Huan (奐); Courtesy name: Jingming (景明)
Era dates
- Jingyuan (景元): 260–264; Xianxi (咸熙): 264–266
Posthumous name
- Emperor Yuan (元帝)
- House: House of Cao
- Father: Cao Yu, Duke of Yan
- Mother: Lady Zhang? (Note: While Zhang Lu's biography in Sanguozhi recorded that a daughter married Cao Yu (referred to by his courtesy name of "Pengzu"), no records indicate that Lady Zhang was Cao Huan's mother. Also, Huan was born about 30 years after his father's marriage to Lady Zhang; the marriage took place soon after Zhang surrendered to Cao Cao in 215.)

Cao Huan (246 (Note: Cao Huan's biography in Sanguozhi recorded that he was 20 (by East Asian reckoning) when he moved to Ye (Hebei) as his final residence on 6 Feb 266. Note that Cao Huan was still alive when Chen Shou compiled the Sanguozhi. Vol.77 of Zizhi Tongjian recorded that Cao Huan was 15 (by East Asian reckoning) when he ascended the throne.) – 302/303 (Note: According to the Wei Shi Pu (魏世谱) by Sun Sheng, Cao Huan was 58 (by East Asian reckoning) when he died in the first year of the Tai'an era during the reign of Emperor Hui of Jin. The year corresponds to 14 Feb 302 to 02 Feb 303 in the Julian calendar.)), courtesy name Jingming, was the fifth and last emperor of the state of Cao Wei during the Three Kingdoms period. On 4 February 266, he abdicated the throne in favour of regent Sima Yan (later Emperor Wu of the Jin dynasty), and brought an end to the Wei regime. After his abdication, Cao Huan was granted the title "Prince of Chenliu" and held it until his death, after which he was posthumously honoured as "Emperor Yuan (of Cao Wei)".

== Family background and accession to the throne ==
Cao Huan's birth name was "Cao Huang" (曹璜). His father, Cao Yu, the Prince of Yan, was a son of Cao Cao, the father of Wei's first emperor, Cao Pi. In 258, at the age of 12, in accordance with Wei's regulations that the sons of princes (other than the first-born son of the prince's spouse or wife, customarily designated the prince's heir) were to be instated as dukes, Cao Huan was instated as the "Duke of Changdao District" (常道鄉公).

In June 260, after the ruling emperor Cao Mao was killed in an attempt to seize back state power from the regent Sima Zhao, Cao Huang was selected to succeed Cao Mao.

== Reign ==
At the time Cao Huang became emperor, his name was changed to "Cao Huan" because it was difficult to observe naming taboo with the name "Huang" (which was a homonym to many common terms—including "yellow" 黃 and "emperor" 皇). During Cao Huan's reign, the Sima clan controlled state power and Cao was merely a figurehead and head of state in name. On 28 Nov 263, Cao Huan instated his wife Lady Bian as empress. (Note: According to Cao Huan's biography in Sanguozhi, Lady Bian became empress on the guimao day of the 10th month of the 4th year of the Jingyuan era of Cao Huan's reign. This corresponds to 28 Nov 263 in the proleptic Gregorian calendar.)

For the first few years of Cao Huan's reign, there were constant attacks by forces from the rival Shu Han state under the command of Shu general Jiang Wei. While Jiang Wei's attacks were largely easily repelled, Sima Zhao eventually ordered a counterattack on Shu with an invading force of 180,000 men commanded by Zhong Hui and Deng Ai. In late 263, Liu Shan, then Shu emperor, surrendered to Deng, bringing an end to the state of Shu. After the fall of Shu, Deng Ai was framed for treason by Zhong Hui and stripped of command. In early 264, Zhong Hui plotted with Jiang Wei to restore Shu and eliminate all the Wei generals who might oppose him. However, the generals started a counterinsurgency and killed Zhong Hui and Jiang Wei. Shu's former territories (in present-day Sichuan, Chongqing, Yunnan, southern Shaanxi, and southeastern Gansu) were completely annexed by Wei.

== Abdication and later life ==
Wei itself did not last much longer after Shu's collapse. In December 263, Sima Zhao again forced Cao Huan to grant him the nine bestowments and this time he finally accepted, signifying that a usurpation was near; at the same time he was also made Duke of Jin. In May 264, Sima Zhao became a vassal king under the title "King of Jin" — the final step before usurpation. After Sima Zhao died in September 265, his son, Sima Yan, inherited his father's position and on 4 February 266 forced Cao Huan to abdicate. Two days later, Cao Huan was located to Ye city, where he would live for the rest of his life. Sima Yan then established the Jin dynasty on 8 February. He granted Cao Huan the title "Prince of Chenliu" which Cao Huan carried until his death.

Not much is known about Cao Huan's life as a prince under Jin rule. Sima Yan (posthumously known as Emperor Wu of Jin) permitted him to retain imperial banners and wagons and to worship ancestors with imperial ceremonies. He also permitted Cao Huan not to refer to himself as a subject of his. He died in 302 or 303 during the reign of Emperor Wu's son, Emperor Hui. He was buried with honours due an emperor and given the posthumous name "Yuan" by the Jin court.

It is not known who immediately succeeded Cao Huan as Prince of Chenliu, but in November or December 326, the title of Prince of Chenliu was conferred upon Cao Mai, a great-great-grandson of Cao Cao, who held the title until his death on 1 December 358. He was succeeded by his son, Cao Hui, whose title was confirmed on 24 November 363. The title of Prince of Chenliu would remain within the Cao clan until it was abolished on 25 September 479 during the reign of Xiao Daocheng, founding emperor of Southern Qi; the final Prince of Chenliu was Cao Can (曹粲).

== Era names ==
- Jingyuan (景元) 260–264
- Xianxi (咸熙) 264–266

== Titles held ==
- Prince of Chenliu (陳留王)
- Emperor Yuan of Wei (魏元帝) (posthumous title)

== Consorts ==
- Empress, of the Bian clan (卞皇后)

== See also ==
- Cao Wei family trees
- Lists of people of the Three Kingdoms
- List of Chinese monarchs

== Notes ==
Emperor Yuan of Cao Wei House of Cao Born: 246 Died: 302
Regnal titles
Preceded by Cao Mao	Emperor of Cao Wei; 260–266 with Sima Zhao (260–265); Sima Yan (265–266)	Abolished
Titles in pretence
Preceded by Cao Mao	— TITULAR — Emperor of China; 260–266; Reason for succession failure: Abdication	Succeeded by Sima Yan
Preceded by Liu Shan	— TITULAR — Emperor of China; 260–266; Reason for succession failure: Abdication	Succeeded by Sima Yan
