= Cao Hui (Prince of Dongping) =

Imperial prince of the state of Cao Wei (died 242)

Cao Hui 曹徽

Prince of Dongping (東平王)
- Tenure: 232 – February or March 242
- Successor: Cao Xi

Prince of Shouzhang (壽張王)
- Tenure: 223–232

Prince of Lujiang (廬江王)
- Tenure: 222–223
- Born: Unknown
- Died: February or March 242 (Note: Cao Fang's biography in the Sanguozhi recorded that Cao Hui died in the 1st month of the 3rd year of the Zhengshi era of Cao Fang's reign. This month corresponds to 17 February to 18 March 242 in the Gregorian calendar.)
- Issue: Cao Xi
Names
- Family name: Cao (曹); Given name: Hui (徽)
Posthumous name
- Prince Ling (靈王)
- House: House of Cao
- Father: Cao Cao
- Mother: Consort Song

Cao Hui (died February or March 242) was an imperial prince of the state of Cao Wei in the Three Kingdoms period of China.

== Life ==
Cao Hui was a son of Cao Cao, a warlord who rose to prominence towards the end of the Han dynasty and laid the foundation for the Cao Wei state. His mother was Consort Song (宋姬), a concubine of Cao Cao. He was designated as the heir of his uncle, Cao Yu (曹玉), because the latter had no son to succeed him when he died. (Note: The Sanguozhi recorded that Cao Yu (曹玉), whose posthumous title was "Marquis Ai of Langling" (朗陵哀侯), was a granduncle of Cao Hui. However, this is likely to be an error since there is no record of Cao Hui's grandfather, Cao Song, having any brothers; therefore, Cao Yu was most probably an uncle of Cao Hui.) In 217, Cao Hui was enfeoffed as the "Marquis of Licheng" (歷城侯) by Emperor Xian, the figurehead emperor of the Han dynasty.

In 220, following Cao Cao's death, Cao Hui's half-brother Cao Pi usurped the throne from Emperor Xian, ended the Han dynasty, and established the Cao Wei state with himself as the new emperor. The following year, Cao Pi enfeoffed Cao Hui as a duke. In 222, Cao Pi elevated Cao Hui from the status of a duke to a prince under the title "Prince of Lujiang" (廬江王). He changed Cao Hui's title to "Prince of Shouzhang" (壽張王) in 223 and designated Shouzhang County (壽張縣; south of present-day Dongping County, Shandong) as Cao Hui's princedom in the following year.

In 232, Cao Pi's successor, Cao Rui, changed Cao Hui's title to "Prince of Dongping" (東平王) after upgrading his princedom from Shouzhang County to the entire Dongping Commandery (with Shouzhang County as its administrative centre). In 234, someone reported Cao Hui to the imperial court after he ordered his subordinate(s) to beat up an official in Shouzhang County. As punishment for his misconduct, Cao Hui had one county with 500 taxable households removed from his princedom. However, the county and its 500 households were returned to him within the same year.

Cao Hui died sometime between 17 February and 18 March 242 during the reign of Cao Rui's successor Cao Fang, and was given the posthumous title "Prince Ling" (靈王).

== Descendants ==
Cao Hui's son, Cao Xi (曹翕), succeeded him as the Prince of Dongping. The number of taxable households in the Dongping princedom increased throughout the reigns of the subsequent Wei emperors until it reached 3,400. After the Jin dynasty (266–420) replaced the Cao Wei state, Cao Xi pledged allegiance to the new emperor Sima Yan (Emperor Wu), who enfeoffed him as the "Duke of Linqiu" (廩丘). Among all the former Wei nobles, Cao Xi was the most famous after Cao Zhi (曹志), the Duke of Zhencheng (鄄城公).

In 266, Cao Xi sent his son and heir apparent, Cao Kun (曹琨), to pay tribute to Emperor Wu Di. The emperor issued an imperial decree to praise Cao Xi for his loyalty towards the Jin dynasty and awarded Cao Kun the appointment of a Cavalry Commandant (騎都尉), a set of official robes, and 100,000 coins. Cao Xi was known for studying medicine and writing books with Huangfu Mi, a physician who lived around the same time as him.

== See also ==
- Cao Wei family trees#Cao Cao's other wives and children
- Lists of people of the Three Kingdoms
