= Cao Jun (Duke of Fan) =

Son of warlord Cao Cao (died 219)

Cao Jun 曹均

Duke of Fan (樊公) (posthumous)
- Successor: Cao Kang

Marquis of Fan (樊侯)
- Tenure: 217 – 219
- Born: Unknown
- Died: 219
- Spouse: Zhang Xiu's daughter
- Issue: Cao Kang
Names
- Family name: Cao (曹); Given name: Jun (均)
Posthumous name
- Duke An (安公)
- House: House of Cao
- Father: Cao Cao
- Mother: Lady Zhou

Cao Jun (died 219) was a son of Cao Cao, a warlord who rose to power in the late Eastern Han dynasty and laid the foundation for the state of Cao Wei in the Three Kingdoms period of China. His mother was Lady Zhou (周姬), a concubine of Cao Cao. As his uncle Cao Bin (曹彬) had no heir, Cao Jun was adopted as Cao Bin's son. In 217, he was enfeoffed as the Marquis of Fan (樊侯). He died in 219 and was succeeded by his son, Cao Kang (曹抗).

In 220, Cao Jun's half-brother Cao Pi became the first emperor of the Cao Wei state after usurping the throne from Emperor Xian, the last emperor of the Han dynasty. The following year, he honoured Cao Jun with the posthumous title "Duke An of Fan" (樊安公). Cao Jun's son and heir, Cao Kang, became the Duke of Fan. In 222, Cao Kang's title was changed to "Duke of Ji" (薊公), and to "Duke of Tunliu" (屯留公) in 223. Cao Kang died in 237 during the reign of Cao Pi's successor, Cao Rui, and was posthumously honoured as "Duke Ding" (定公). He was succeeded by his son, Cao Chen (曹諶), as the Duke of Tunliu. Throughout the reigns of the subsequent Wei emperors, the number of taxable households in Cao Chen's dukedom increased until it reached 1,900.

== See also ==
- Cao Wei family trees#Cao Cao's other wives and children
- Lists of people of the Three Kingdoms
