= Cao Zhang =

State of Cao Wei prince (died 223)

Cao Zhang 曹彰
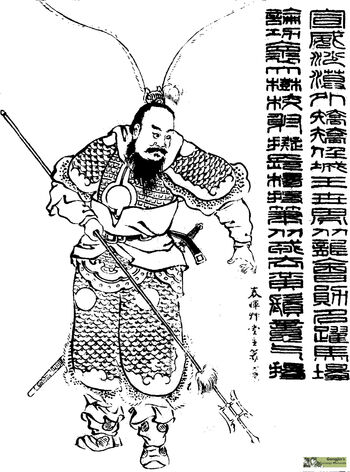
- Qing Dynasty illustration of Cao Zhang

Prince of Rencheng (任城王)
- Tenure: 30 March 222 – 1 August 223
- Successor: Cao Kai

Duke of Yanling (鄢陵公)
- Tenure: 221 – 30 March 222
- Born: between 188 and 192
- Died: 1 August 223 (Note: Cao Pi's biography in the Sanguozhi recorded that Cao Zhang died on the jiaxu day of the 6th month of the 4th year of the Huangchu era of Cao Pi's reign. This date corresponds to 1 August 223 in the Gregorian calendar.) (aged 31 - 35)
- Spouse: Lady Sun
- Issue: Cao Kai (fl.220 - 260s); Lady Cao
Names
- Family name: Cao (曹); Given name: Zhang (彰); Courtesy name: Ziwen (子文)
Posthumous name
- Prince Wei (威王)
- House: House of Cao
- Father: Cao Cao
- Mother: Empress Wuxuan

Cao Zhang (189? – 1 August 223), courtesy name Ziwen, nicknamed "The Yellow Goatee" (黃鬚兒), was a prince of the state of Cao Wei during the Three Kingdoms period of China. He was a son of Cao Cao, a warlord who rose to power towards the end of the Han dynasty and laid the foundation of Wei. Cao Zhang was said to have wrestled and killed wild animals with his bare hands. He also served as a general under his father, having led his troops to significant victories against Wuhuan incursions on the northern frontier.

== Background ==
The second of Cao Cao's four sons by Lady Bian, Cao Zhang was said to excel and obsessed in archery and armed combat in his youth so much so that he would fight fierce beasts with his bare hands. Though Cao Cao criticised his lack of academic knowledge, Cao Zhang had always aspired to pursue a career in the military. Once, his father sent him to the imperial university to study, but Cao Zhang lamented to his aides, saying a real man should command the army to make a name for himself instead of becoming a intellectual (博士; boshi).

== As a general ==
When the Wuhuan tribe rebelled on the northern frontier in c.May 218, Cao Zhang, holding the rank of Northern General of the Household, acting on the authority of General of the Resolute Cavalry (驍騎將軍), led a force of 1,000 infantry and several hundreds of cavalry from the central government to suppress the revolt. Before his departure, Cao Cao summoned him and specially warned him: "We are father and son at home, but we are supervisor and subordinate when assigned a task: the law will be applied straightly if you ever made any mistake. Keep this in mind." When Cao Zhang arrived at the battlefield, his force had not been joined by that of the local government as planned. Outnumbered by the enemy, Cao Zhang took up a passive stance and defended the vital passes and routes. The rebels could not gain an advantage and dissipated. Cao Zhang then led his force out in pursuit, displaying great valour in the ensuing battles. Cao Zhang personally fought against the enemy soldiers at close quarters and shot down many enemy horsemen with arrows. Several arrows were embedded in his armor by the end of a half-day long battle. Despite opposition from his subordinates, he ordered the pursuit be continued after the initial victory. One of his staff came out and reminded him that Cao Cao's order was that the army could not cross the jurisdiction of Dai, and further pursuit was strictly prohibited, but Cao Zhang argued that a good general did not follow dull orders, and threatened if anyone did not join the pursuit would be penalised with the death sentence; thus, they performed a 24-hour dash to catch up with the Wuhuan cavalry, and dealt the latter a major blow which caused a few thousands casualties. The Xianbei tribe leader Kebineng had led a 10,000-strong cavalry force nearby to observe the ongoing war between the Cao Wei and Wuhuan tribes. Having seen the splendid victories Cao Zhang scored, Kebineng submitted to him. Unrest on the northern frontier was then quelled.

Cao Zhang then hurried west to take part in the Hanzhong Campaign against Liu Bei. Upon reaching Chang'an, however, he found out that the war had already been lost. Cao Cao then promoted his son to General of the Elite Cavalry (越騎將軍) and left him to defend Chang'an against probable advances of Liu Bei.

According to unofficial supplementary records works by Wang Jia from the Eastern Jin dynasty, Cao Zhang once said that he had personally tamed a White elephant from Nanyue, which was sent through king Sun Quan of Eastern Wu. The act caused the audience to be amazed.

== Death ==
Shortly after returning to Luoyang in 220, Cao Cao fell ill. He died in March, as Cao Zhang was en route to see him. His successor Cao Pi then sent all his brothers, including Cao Zhang, back to their individual fiefdoms, for fear that they might contest his position. In 222, Cao Zhang was enfeoffed as the Prince of Rencheng (任城王). In the following year, Cao Zhang died due to sickness while attending court at the capital. He received the posthumous title "Prince Wei" (威王), literally meaning awe-inspiring prince. (Note: Sun Sheng's Wei Shi Chun Qiu recorded that Cao Zhang died suddenly as he was overcome by anger; he had been snubbed and refused an audience during his visit to the capital. Cao Pi had apparently held a grudge as Zhang had asked about Cao Cao's seal during the aftermath of his death in 220; the incident was recorded in Jia Kui's biography in Sanguozhi (as Jia was in charge of arranging Cao Cao's funeral, along with Sima Yi).)

=== Legends ===
There are ahistorical legends surrounding the death of Cao Zhang. The most famous of these legends is that Cao Zhang was poisoned by Cao Pi. The collection of anecdotes Shishuo Xinyu states that after Cao Cao died, Cao Pi summoned Cao Zhang to the palace to meet him. During a casual conversation, Cao Zhang asked his brother if he could see his imperial seal. This got Cao Pi worried that his brother wanted to usurp his throne so Cao Pi decided to kill him. Cao Pi knew that Cao Zhang was their mother's favourite son, so in order to get away with it, he had to make Cao Zhang's death seem natural. A few weeks later, Cao Pi invited his brother to a game of weiqi during their mother's birthday. The match was very close in the middle game when Cao Pi's servants brought some prunes, some that were poisoned. Cao Pi made sure he ate the unmarked ones that were not poisonous and make sure his brother ate the other ones. When Cao Zhang realised that he had been poisoned, he screamed for help. Empress Bian got to the scene on her bare feet and tried to search for water to flush down the poison that was now in Cao Zhang's body. But unfortunately for Cao Zhang, the crafty Cao Pi had secretly placed all the containers away beforehand and so Empress Bian failed to get the water; Cao Zhang then died at the hands of his own brother. Professor Ye Jiaying pointed out several loopholes in the story.

== In Romance of the Three Kingdoms ==
Romance of the Three Kingdoms, a 14th-century historical novel, is a romanticisation of the events that occurred before and during the Three Kingdoms era. The author probably exaggerated the tension between Cao Zhang and his elder brother Cao Pi just after their father Cao Cao's death.

Cao Pi, the eldest surviving son of Cao Cao and the rightful heir, succeeded his late father. However, news came that Cao Zhang, leading a 100,000-strong army from Chang'an, was approaching the capital. Cao Pi was gripped by fear that his brother would contest the heirship with the military power he held.

Jia Kui, an adviser to Cao Pi, then volunteered to persuade Cao Zhang to desist. Jia Kui then went out of the city to meet Cao Zhang and ask him if he came as a mourner or a rival claimant to the throne. "I come as a mourner with no ulterior motive," replied Cao Zhang. "That being so, why bring in your soldiers?" Jia Kui said, whereupon Cao Zhang ordered his troops to wait outside the city while he entered alone. When the brothers met, they embraced and wept. Cao Zhang then passed the command of his force to Cao Pi and returned to his own fiefdom. Thus Cao Pi's position was more or less secured.

== See also ==
- Lists of people of the Three Kingdoms
