= Nymph of the Luo River =

Nymph of the Luo River is a cross-cultural, metaphorical translation of Luoshen, the goddess or the personification of the Luo River. She is depicted in the following works:

- Luoshen Fu, a third-century Fu poem by Cao Zhi.
- Luoshen Fu Illustrations, a serie of fourth-century illustrations traditionally attributed to Gu Kaizhi and based on the Luoshen Fu.
