= Ode to Luoshen =

Chinese Classic literature work

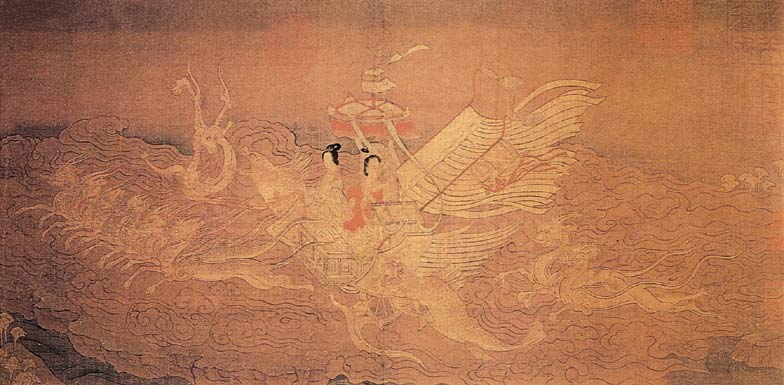
A copy of Luoshen Fu paintings, in the collection of the National Palace Museum

Luoshen Fu (traditional Chinese: 洛神賦; simplified Chinese: 洛神赋, also translated as Ode to Luoshen, Rhapsody on the Luo River Goddess or Nymph of the Luo River) is a Chinese Fu poem written by Cao Zhi in the fourth year of the Huangchu era (223) under Emperor Wen of Wei. It first appears in Xiao Tong's Wen Xuan, whose preface states that when Cao Zhi was returning from the capital to his fief, he passed by the Luo River and was suddenly inspired to compose this fu. Luoshen (洛神, The goddess of Luo River) is, in Chinese mythology, the daughter of Fuxi (宓羲). Because she drowned in the Luo River, she became the goddess of the Luo River, namely the Luo River goddess.

== Theme ==
The most straightforward theme of Ode to Luoshen is a love narrative in which a human and a goddess meet yet ultimately cannot unite. It is regarded as an important representative work of lyrical fu. Compared with typical Han fu, which focused on the elaborate description of palaces, imperial hunts, and capitals, this work places greater emphasis on character portrayal, personal emotion, and the shaping of the goddess image. Influenced by the "mourning for Zhen" theory in the commentary of Li Shan, later generations often associated the work with Lady Zhen.

Scholars of successive dynasties have produced allegorical and hidden-meaning interpretations. Some studies tend to understand the text in light of Cao Zhi’s political frustrations during the Huangchu era, the constraints of ritual norms, and the unattainability of ideals; others place it within the genealogy of goddess fu and discuss how it developed from the goddess tradition of Song Yu.

== Textual transmission ==
Ode to Luoshen was transmitted over the long term through textual traditions such as the Collected Works of Cao Zhi, the Complete Prose of the Three Kingdoms, and the Wen Xuan, among which the Li Shan-annotated edition of the Wen Xuan had an especially great influence on later reading and interpretation.

== Cultural influences ==
=== Painting ===
This fu is rich in ornate diction and novel metaphors, and has repeatedly been quoted and praised by later literati. It was also reinterpreted in many forms. In the Eastern Jin period, the great painter Gu Kaizhi also created a painting based on this Fu, titled Luoshen Fu Scroll (洛神賦圖). The original version is lost.

In two Song-dynasty copies, Cao Zhi and his attendants stand on the bank gazing toward the graceful and ethereal Luo River goddess on the water, together with various immortals and monsters. One of these copies is now in the Palace Museum in Beijing, while the other was taken by the last emperor Puyi when he fled to the Northeast; after the surrender of Japan in World War II, it was scattered among the people and was later collected by the Liaoning Museum.

Song copy of Luoshen Fu Scroll (Beijing Version A), in the collection of the Palace Museum in Beijing

=== Calligraphy ===
The calligrapher Wang Xianzhi once wrote Luoshen Fu; today only thirteen lines last, known as the Thirteen Lines on Jade and the Thirteen Lines of the Younger Wang, among other names. Zhao Mengfu also wrote it in small regular script.

=== Novels ===
In addition to the many quotations from Ode to Luoshen in Jin Yong’s wuxia novel Demi-Gods and Semi-Devils, other notable examples include Pei Xing’s Biography of the Luo River Goddess from the Tang dynasty, Du Guangting’s “Mi Fei of the Luo River,” and, from the Qing dynasty, Pu Songling’s “Lady Zhen” in Strange Tales from a Chinese Studio, Guan Shihao’s “Luo River Goddess” in Ying Tan, and Yue Jun’s “Mi Fei” in Ershi Lu. In the modern and contemporary periods, Nangong Bo, Bi Zhen, Jian Yuanxin, Hu Xiaoming, and Hu Xiaohui each have novels titled Luoshen Fu.

=== Other ===
From the Six Dynasties to the present, the reception of Ode to Luoshen in poetry, ci, fu, drama, and many other genres has never ceased; it has even extended into artistic fields such as theatre, film, television drama, dance drama, and music.

== See also ==
- Fu (poetry)
- Records of the Three Kingdoms, Book of Wei
- Wen Xuan and Li Shan’s commentary
- 〈洛神賦〉的傳播與接受
