= Qiu Zhu =

Chinese artist (fl. 1565–1585)

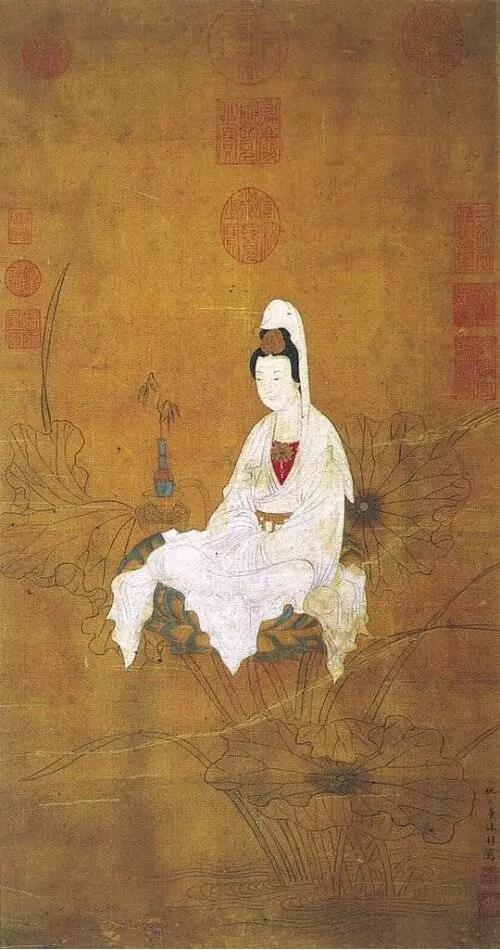
- White Robed Guanyin, collection of the National Palace Museum, Taipei
- Born: first half of the 16th century Taicang, Suzhou, Ming dynasty China
- Died: after 1585
- Education: Qiu Ying
- Known for: Painting, illustration
- Movement: Wu School

Chinese name
- Chinese: 仇珠
Transcriptions
Standard Mandarin
- Hanyu Pinyin: Qiú Zhū
- Wade–Giles: Ch'iu^{2} Chu^{2}
- IPA: [tɕʰjǒʊ ʈʂú]

Qiu Zhu (Chinese: 仇珠; Wade–Giles: Ch'iu Chu; fl. 1565–1585), commonly known as Miss Qiu and by her art name Duling Neishi (Chinese: 杜陵内史), was a Chinese painter during the Ming dynasty, noted for paintings with figures (rather than landscapes), including several depictions of the goddess Guanyin.

== Life ==
Qiu Zhu was born in Taicang County, Suzhou Prefecture, the daughter of Qiu Ying (1494? – 1552), one of the Four Masters of the Ming dynasty. Little is known about her life, and it is assumed that she learned to paint from her father. She was possibly married to You Qiu (尤求), an artist influenced by her father and generally believed to be his son-in-law, although this has been questioned by some scholars. In his later life Qiu Ying lived at the estate of his patron, collector Xiang Yuanbian, and she might have also lived there. She maintained a close relationship with the Xiang family after her father's death, and at least one of her extant works bears the seal of a Xiang family member.

== Work ==
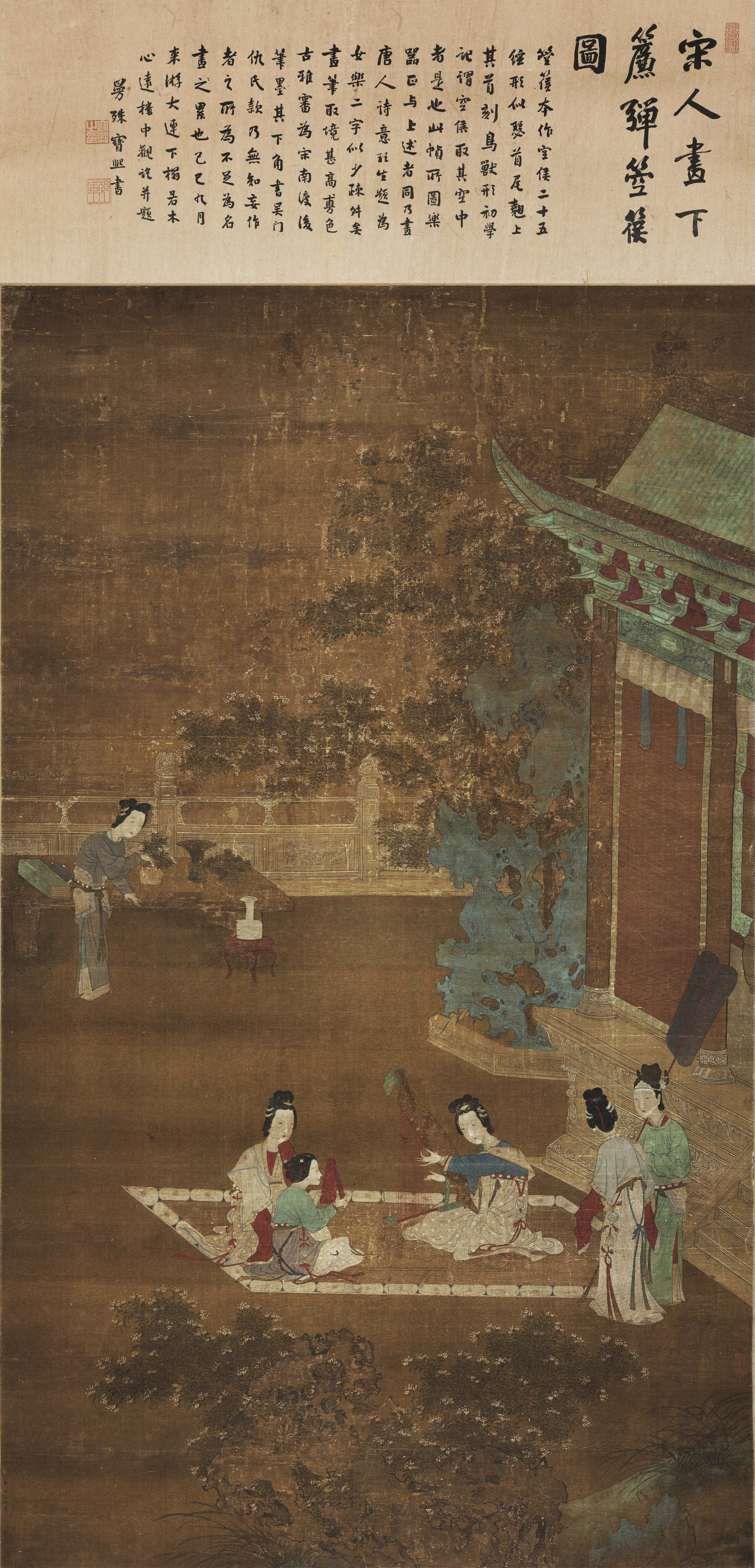
Painting of women playing musical instruments, collection of the Palace Museum, Beijing

Qiu Zhu was active as an artist from around 1565 to 1585. She was commissioned to produce paintings for birthday gifts, or to complement calligraphy. She was also commissioned to create illustrations for Wang Chong's calligraphy of the narrative poem Nymph of the Luo River. This suggests her work was well received, as Wang was held in high esteem.

A later Ming dynasty scholar considered Qiu Zhu to be a "Li Gonglin among women". Li Gonglin was a highly regarded artist in his time. Qiu Zhu is noted for her use of firm brushstrokes and delicate drawing.

Qiu Zhu's most famous subject is Guanyin, the bodhisattva of compassion especially appealing to women, and her paintings of the goddess have been described as "mysteriously transcendent". The 24 portraits of Guanyin are presented in an album alternating them with short text passages. They are in gold ink on black paper, and were inspired by an album of woodblock prints by Ding Yunpeng (1547–1628) that had been based on a hand scroll by Li Gonglin. Her acclaimed painting, White Robed Guanyin, is in the collection of the National Palace Museum in Taipei. She also painted other religious figures, such as her fan painting of A Daoist Female Immortal, possibly Chang E.

Her non-religious subjects are primarily women at leisure: playing xiangqi under plum blossoms, playing a guqin under wutong trees, sitting at a writing desk, or playing with a parrot. She also painted women celebrating the Double Seven Festival which is a festival honoring the Weaver Maid, the patron spirit of women's work.

Qiu Zhu was considered a highly refined painter, and is seen to have influenced Wen Shu.

== Paintings ==
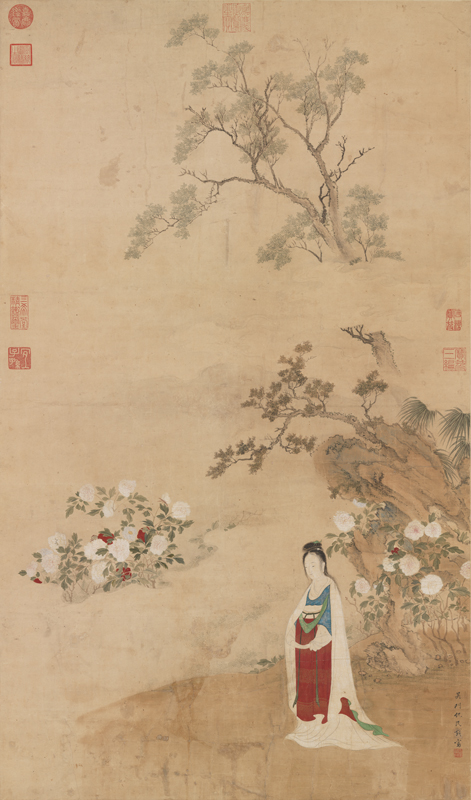
Inspired by a Tang Poet, collection of the National Palace Museum, Taipei

- Nymph of the Luo River
- White Robed Guanyin
- Portraits of Guanyin. Album of 26 leaves. Gold on black paper.
- Plum Blossoms and Peonies. Fan painting.
- Inspired by a Tang Poet
