= Fu Baoshi =

Chinese painter

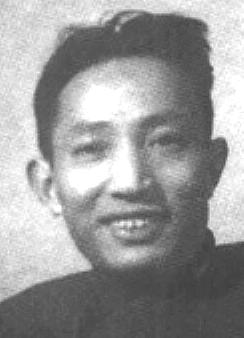
Fu Baoshi

Fu Baoshi (Chinese: 傅抱石; also romanized Fu Pao-Shih; October 5, 1904– September 29, 1965) was a Chinese painter from Xinyu, Jiangxi. He went to Japan to study the History of Oriental Art in the Tokyo School of Fine Arts in 1933. He translated many books from Japanese and carried out his own research. In painting itself, he brought Japanese visual elements to the Chinese ink painting tradition.

Fu taught in the Art Department of the National Central University (now Nanjing University) from 1935, and later became director of the Jiangsu Chinese Painting Institute and a vice-chairman of the Federation of Chinese Artists. The vast majority of Fu Baoshi’s extant paintings originate from two relatively brief periods: his years in Chongqing (1939–1945) and the early 1960s. These works consist almost exclusively of landscapes or figure paintings, frequently centered on historical themes; there are no bird, flower or bamboo paintings among them. Despite the political shifts that occurred between these two periods, his artistic style and brushwork remained remarkably consistent throughout.

== Early life and career ==
Fu’s father made a living by repairing umbrellas. As a child, Fu would help his father with his work; it is said that he used the leftover scraps of oiled paper from his father’s umbrella-repairing trade for his early artistic creations. From 1933 to 1935, he studied in Tokyo. After returning to China in 1935,, Fu took up a teaching position at the National Central University in Nanjing. Following the outbreak of the Second Sino-Japanese War, he first retreated to his hometown of Xinyu, then made his way to Dong'an in Hunan and Guilin in Guangxi. In 1939, he relocated to Chongqing with the Third Bureau of the Political Department of the National Government's Military Commission—an organization tasked with anti-Japanese propaganda, in which Guo Moruo held a leadership role. Fu and Guo had previously met in Japan in 1932. Fu Baoshi's works of landscape painting employed skillful use of dots and inking methods, creating a new technique encompassing many varieties within traditional rules.

== Scholarship and technique ==
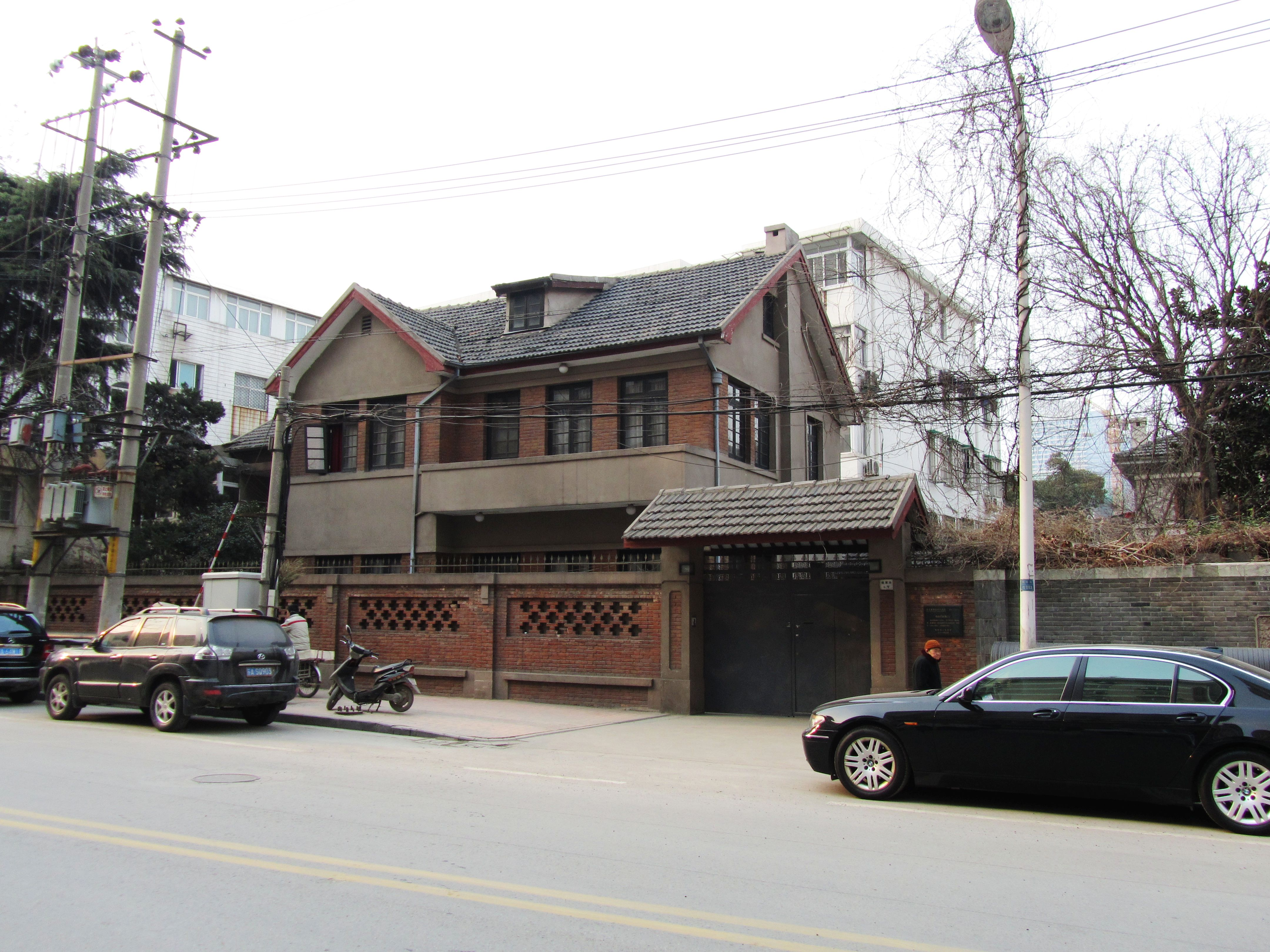
Former residence of Fu Baoshi in Nanjing

Fu Baoshi’s artistic practice was inextricably linked to his scholarly research. During his time in Japan, he encountered the work of Japanese scholar Kinbara Seigo, who studied the fourth-century painter Gu Kaizhi—a subject Fu continued to explore in depth while living in Chongqing in the early 1940s. In his landscape paintings, Fu employed a sophisticated combination of wet, dense, and dry ink, often layering dry brushstrokes over wet ones, and integrating ink with pigments (notably light yellowish-brown tones). Furthermore, he utilized a greater variety of paper types than most of his contemporaries; This preference may have stemmed from his period of residence in Japan. He also made extensive use of layered ink washes—a technique he noted had not been fully exploited in early Chinese landscape painting. Moreover, during the 1950s and 1960s, he experimented with splashing an alum solution onto the paper to evoke the atmosphere of falling rain.

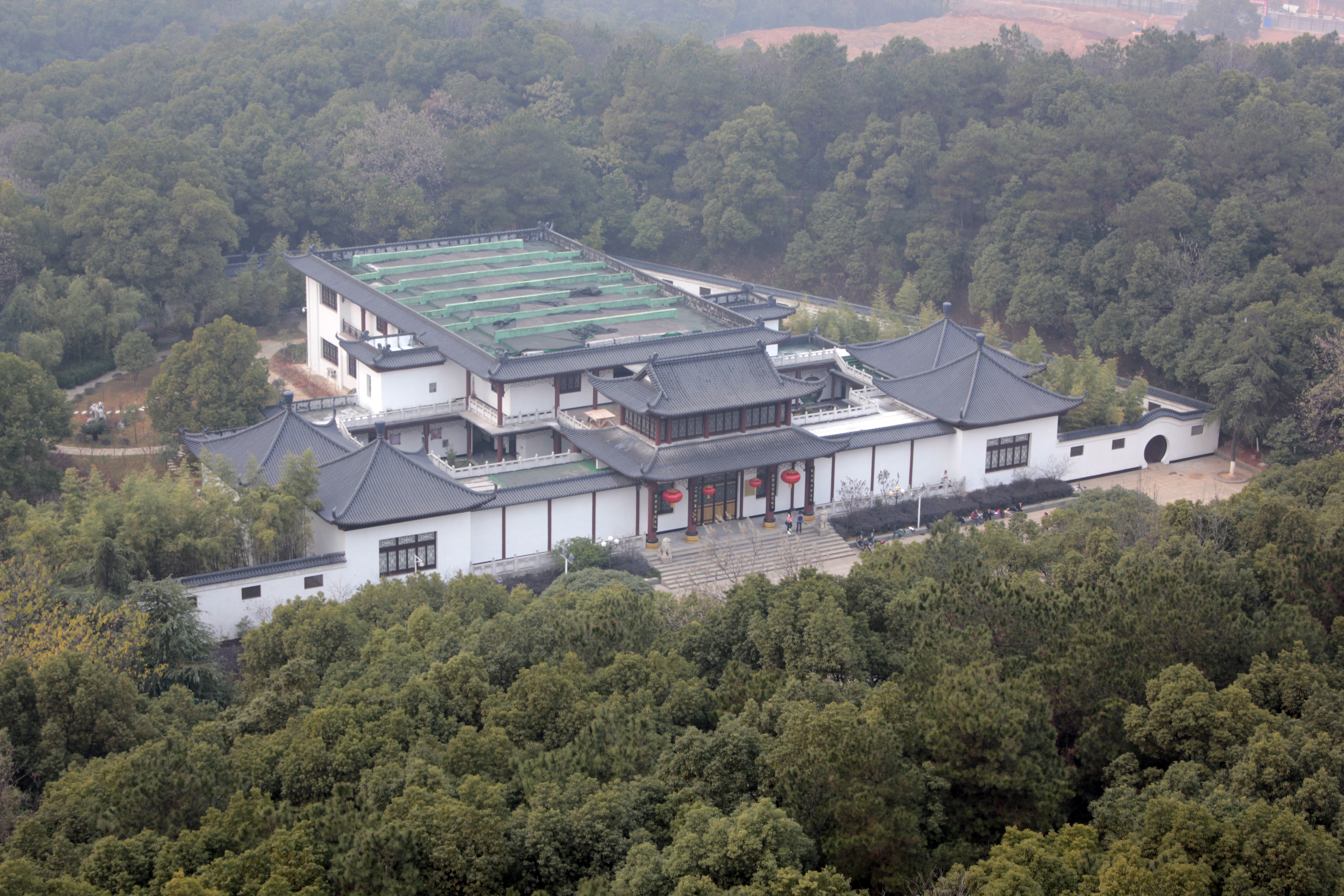
Fu Baoshi Memorial Hall in Xinyu hosts a permanent exhibition of his artworks

== Painter ==
As well as painting landscapes, Fu Baoshi was also an accomplished painter of figures. His paintings of ancient Chinese figures from the 3rd and 4th centuries BC are particularly acclaimed.

Fu Baoshi was a great admirer of ShiTao and, at the age of 18, changed his name to "BaoShi" – meaning embracing "Shitao". He even wrote a chronicle of Shitao, recording his life experiences and social activities as well as his art creations. Fu Baoshi admitted that he was obsessed with the study of Shitao's painting.

As a leader of the so-called New Chinese Painting Movement, which reformed traditional Chinese painting after 1949, Fu stood out from most of his contemporaries with his great passion for art, and his innovative brushwork and unique picture composition.

Fu began to promote drawing from life tours in 1953.

Fu's reforms were followed by a group of artists in Nanjing where he then lived. He was recognized as the founder of the Nanjing-based New Jinling School of Fine Arts. The school included such important artists as Chen Zhifo (1896–1962), Qian Songyan (1898–1985), Song Wenzhi (1919–1999), Wei Zixi (1915–2002) and Ya Ming (1924–2002).

As part of the New Guohua Campaign encouraged by the state during the Great Leap Forward, Fu was elevated to major leadership positions at art institutions and was appointed to the Chinese People's Political Consultative Conference. Along with Guan Shanyue, Fu was commissioned by China's central government to supply paintings for the Great Hall of the People. The two were asked to incorporate the scenery of regions all over the country into one painting to symbolize the essence of the People's Republic of China.

In September 1960, following the inauguration of the Jiangsu Chinese Painting Institute (of which Fu was the director), Fu was part of a group of 13 guohua painters who visited a dozen places in six provinces as part of the "Twenty-three Thousand Li of Life Sketching".

In 1961, Fu went on a tour of the northeast to produce paintings of the region. Among the places he visited was the Fushun coal mine, one of the most productive in the country. Fu was initially reluctant to paint the scene, which a local Chinese Communist Party Committee Secretary had shown to him, deeming it not paintable or ugly. According to Fu, Fu was surprised and moved by the party secretary's exclamation, "Look at the coal, how beautiful the color is!" and decided to paint the scene. Fu sought to capture the robustness of the mine and what he saw as the grandeur of the mining enterprises, but found it difficult to show the layers of the coal's blackness using black ink. The final piece is meidu zhuangguan (Spectacular view of the coal capital) (1964).

== Water ==
=== Rain ===
Scenes directly depicting rainfall are relatively rare in traditional Chinese painting, largely due to the significant challenges involved in rendering rainy landscapes realistically. Even in Western art, works dedicated purely to depicting rain are uncommon.

From the early 1940s onwards, Fu Baoshi repeatedly explored rainy landscapes across various seasons, geographical settings, and weather conditions, capturing forms ranging from torrential downpours and light drizzles to misty, rain-shrouded scenes.

His ongoing exploration of this theme is evident in works such as Night Rain in the Sichuan Mountains (1945), Spring Rain at the West Lake (1963), and Mist and Rain on the Yangtze River (1964).

=== Waterfalls ===
Waterfalls were a recurring subject in Fu Baoshi’s exploration of the theme of water within his landscape paintings. He began depicting waterfall landscapes during his time in Chongqing and continued to refine this subject matter into the early 1960s. Much like his landscapes depicting rain, his waterfall paintings focus on capturing the dynamic nature of water and its interaction with the surrounding scenery. Fu employed a variety of techniques—including the use of dry and wet brushwork, washes of dense ink, and the combination of ink and color. The texture of the paper also contributed to the visual qualities of his paintings. Through these methods, he sought to convey the fluidity of the water while simultaneously capturing the distinctive forms of the landscape and the expressive power of the brush and ink.

== Chongqing period ==
Fu Baoshi moved to Chongqing in 1939, having previously studied in Japan and taught at National Central University in Nanjing. His artistic output increased significantly during the early 1940s; In 1942 and 1943, he participated in several solo and group exhibitions while creating a large number of landscapes and figure paintings.

During this period, Fu continued his study of traditional Chinese painting, focusing particularly on the late Ming dynasty artist Shitao. His interest in Shitao is evident in works such as Visiting Shitao (1942). Historical and literary themes also played a prominent role in his work; for instance, the painting Portrait of Liu Jingting (1943) relates to the historical drama The Peach Blossom Fan.

== Japanese influence ==
Fu Baoshi studied in Japan from 1933 to 1935, a period during which he encountered Japanese landscape painting techniques. His depiction of the scene in the rain bears a resemblance to Japanese ink wash painting, particularly in the use of diluted ink and the rendering of visible brushstrokes.

In addition, Fu translated a treatise on painting by the Japanese artist Takashima Hokkai; the work combined traditional landscape painting techniques with geological observation.

== Bibliography ==
- Fu Baoshi. Zhongguo Shuhua Lilun (Theories of Chinese Paintings). The Commercial Press, 1935.
- Fu Baoshi. Shitao Shangren Nianpu (Chronological Biography of Shitao). Beijing and Shanghai Weekly P., 1948.
- Fu Boashi. Zhongguo de Renwu Hua He Shanshui Hua (Chinese Figural and Landscape Paintings). Shanghai Cultural Publishing House, 1955.
- Fu Baoshi. Zhongguo de Huihua (Chinese Paintings). China Classical Art Publishing House, 1958.
- Fu Baoshi. Xiandai Zhongguo Hua (Modern Chinese Paintings). Beijing: People's Fine Art Publishing House, 1961.
- Fu Baoshi and Guan Shanyuan et al. Meishu Yiwgadai Jinyantan (Speaking from Experience of Art Creation). Shanghai People's Fine Art Publishing House, 1961.
- Fu Baoshi. Shan He Xin Mao (New Appearances of Mountains and Rivers). Nanjing: Jiangsu People's Publishing House, 1962.
- Fu Baoshi. Guohua Shanshui Jiexi (Explanations of Chinese Landscape Paintings). Taipei: Taiwan Tiantong Publishing House, 1973.
- Zhao Puchu. Paintings and Calligraphy of Jinling. Nanjing: Jinling Shuhuashe, 1981.
- Fu Baoshi Shuxie Ji (Fu Baoshi's Sketches Collection). Nanjing: Jiangsu Fine Art Publishing House, 1985.
- Hui Laiping ed.. Complete Collection of Han Mo Magazine. Hong Kong: Han Mo Xuan Publishing Co. Ltd., 1990 – 2006.
- Jiangxi Provincial Historical Records Research Committee, Xinyu Municipal Historical Records Research Committee ed.. Fu Baoshi – Jiangxi Historical Records Vol. 44. Xinyu: Jiangxi People's Publishing House, 1992.
- Gao Yuzhen ed.. Paintings by Fu Pao-Shih. Taipei: National Museum of History, 1994.
- Chen Chuanxi. China Famous Painters Collection—Fu Baoshi. Shijiazhuang: Hebei Educational Publishing House, 2000.
- Chen Chuanxi. Chinese Famous Paintiners – Fu Baoshi. Hebei Educational Publishing House, 2000.
- Ye Zonghao. Collection of Fu Baoshi Art Essays. Shanghai Rarebooks Publishing House, 2003.
- Ye Zonghao. Chronological Biography of Fu Baoshi. Shanghai Rarebooks Publishing House, 2004.
- Fu Baoshi Memorial. Qi Ming Wei Xin – Collection of Fu Baoshi Centennial Memorial Essays. Zhengzhou: Henan Fine Art Publishing House, 2004.
- Qi Ming Wei Xin – Fu Baoshi Centennial Memorial. Exhibition of Private Collection of Fu Baoshi's Works, 2004.
- Ye Zonghao. The World of Fu Baoshi. Taipei: Shi Zh Tang Publishing Co. Ltd., 2004.

== See also ==
- Fu Baoshi Memorial Food Court
