= Wen Shu =

Chinese painter

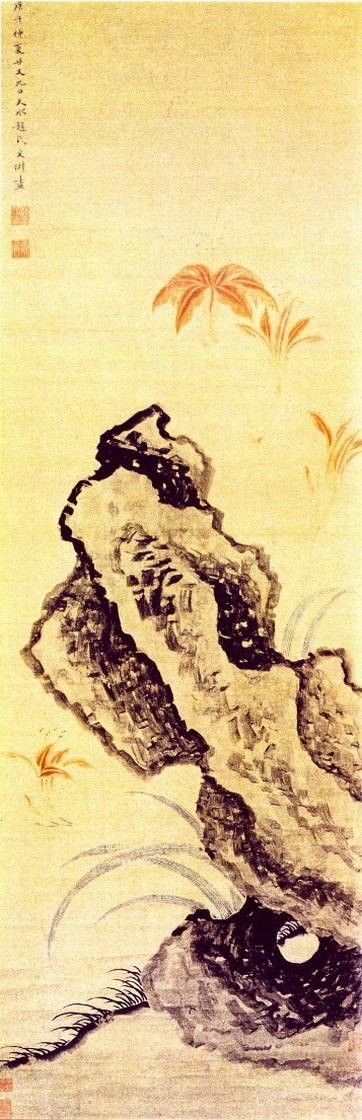
- Beautiful day with rocks, by Wen
- Born: Wen Shu; 1595; Suzhou, Wu (region), China
- Died: 1634 (aged 38–39)
- Education: Wen Congjian
- Known for: Painting, illustration
- Movement: Wu School

Wen Shu or Wen Chu (Chinese: 文俶; 1595-1634) was a Chinese illustrator and painter who worked under the art name Hanshan and was known for her paintings of flora and small insects during the Ming dynasty. She is considered the finest flower painter of the period.

Her work was popular at the time, and consistently sells well at auction. Her painting Rising Early in the Spring to Lament Flowers (1631) was sold at Christie's New York on 16 September 2015 for US$413,000, four times its estimate.

== Life ==
Wen Shu was the great-granddaughter of Wen Zhengming, a leading Ming dynasty painter of the Wu School whose family were also highly respected in the movement. Her father was Wen Congjian, a landscape painter, and taught both his children to paint from a young age. Her brother, Wen Ran, was a calligrapher and landscape painter.

Wen Shu married Zhao Yun who was a student of her father and a member of the House of Zhao. They lived a reclusive life in a villa close to the Hanshan Temple outside Suzhou, in an area noted for its natural beauty. They had one child, a daughter called Zhao Zhao, and adopted a male cousin of Zhao in order to continue the male line.

Most of Wen Shu's surviving art is dated 1626 or later. This is after Zhao Yun's father died and the family's fortunes declined, so it is likely that Wen Shu turned to commercial art production in order to maintain her family's lifestyle. One critical essay suggests this is because Zhao Yun was unwilling to work but this is not supported by other sources. She was sought out as a tutor by both married women and girls in the gentry.

After Zhao Jun died in 1640, Wen Shu's daughter Zhao Zhao collected the biographical information on both her parents for the tomb inscription.

== Work ==
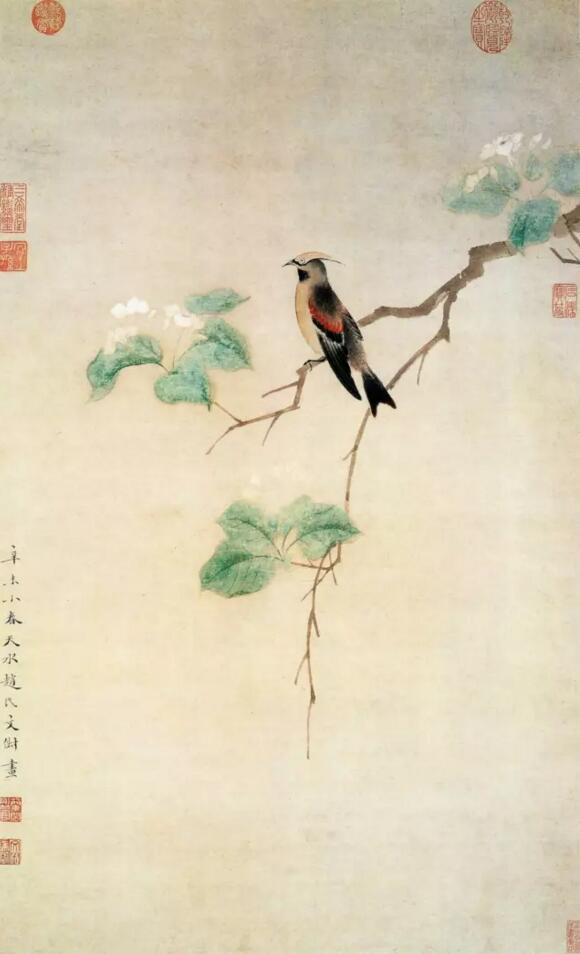
Painting of Flowers and Bird, collection of the Shanghai Museum

Wen Shu worked under the pen-name Hanshan, among others, and in a range of formats. She painted hanging scrolls, fan paintings and illustration. Her primary subjects were flowers and wildlife as unwritten rules on suitable subjects for women painters meant women rarely painted landscapes. Wen Shu may have chosen flora in particular for their commercial aspect as new paintings of flowers were in demand. This is supported by the fact her work seldom carries poems or dedications: the absence of these is an indicator of work for commercial clients.

=== Style ===
Wen Shu focused on a few essential elements in the composition presented against a plain background. This style means the eye is drawn to the brushwork and pale colors displayed. Her approach is seen as intimate rather than showy, with a careful composition that often frames glimpses of delicate flowers with rough rocks. This composition echoes the popular garden layouts of her time.

This approach can be seen in her fan painting, Carnations and Garden Rock of 1627, which uses a limited palette and only two elements for the composition. She is noted for an attention to detail, even when she was using the mogu (boneless) technique.

=== Reception ===
Her professional work was sufficiently popular that she trained female assistants to help with the workload. For the collection Pattern of Plants and Insects by Hanshan she produced one illustration a day for one thousand days. During her lifetime, other artists would produce forgeries of her work. One collector suggested her flower paintings were the equal of Qiu Zhu, an earlier female professional painter.

== Legacy ==
Wen Shu's style is reflected in work by later artists, such as Yun Shouping. She was cited in inscriptions and seals by later female artists. Chinese art critic Wang Wenzhi, writing in the 1700s, asserted that Wen Shu's work was so special and sensitive that it could not be duplicated by a man and cited Luo Qilan and Wang Yuyan (painter) as her artistic descendants. Other artistic descendants include Li Hui, Guo Shu and Yuan Lan.

In 1994, the International Astronomical Union's (IAU) Working Group for Planetary System Nomenclature approved naming a crater on Venus Wen Shu after her.

== Paintings ==
- Insects, Birds and Butterflies (1626). Album of twelve leaves, painting on silk.
- Insects, Birds and Flowers. Album of twelve leaves, painting on silk.
- Carnations and Garden Rock (1627). Fan painting.
- Lily, Narcissus, and Garden Rock (1627). Hanging scroll.
- Playing Butterflies (1630). Hand scroll.
- Rising Early in the Spring to Lament Flowers (1631). Hanging scroll.
- Flowers and Birds in the Style of the Song Court (1631). Ink on silk.
- Flowers and Butterflies (1632). Hanging scroll.
- Grasshopper and Flowers (1633). Fan painting.
