= Fang Zhaoling =

Chinese painter

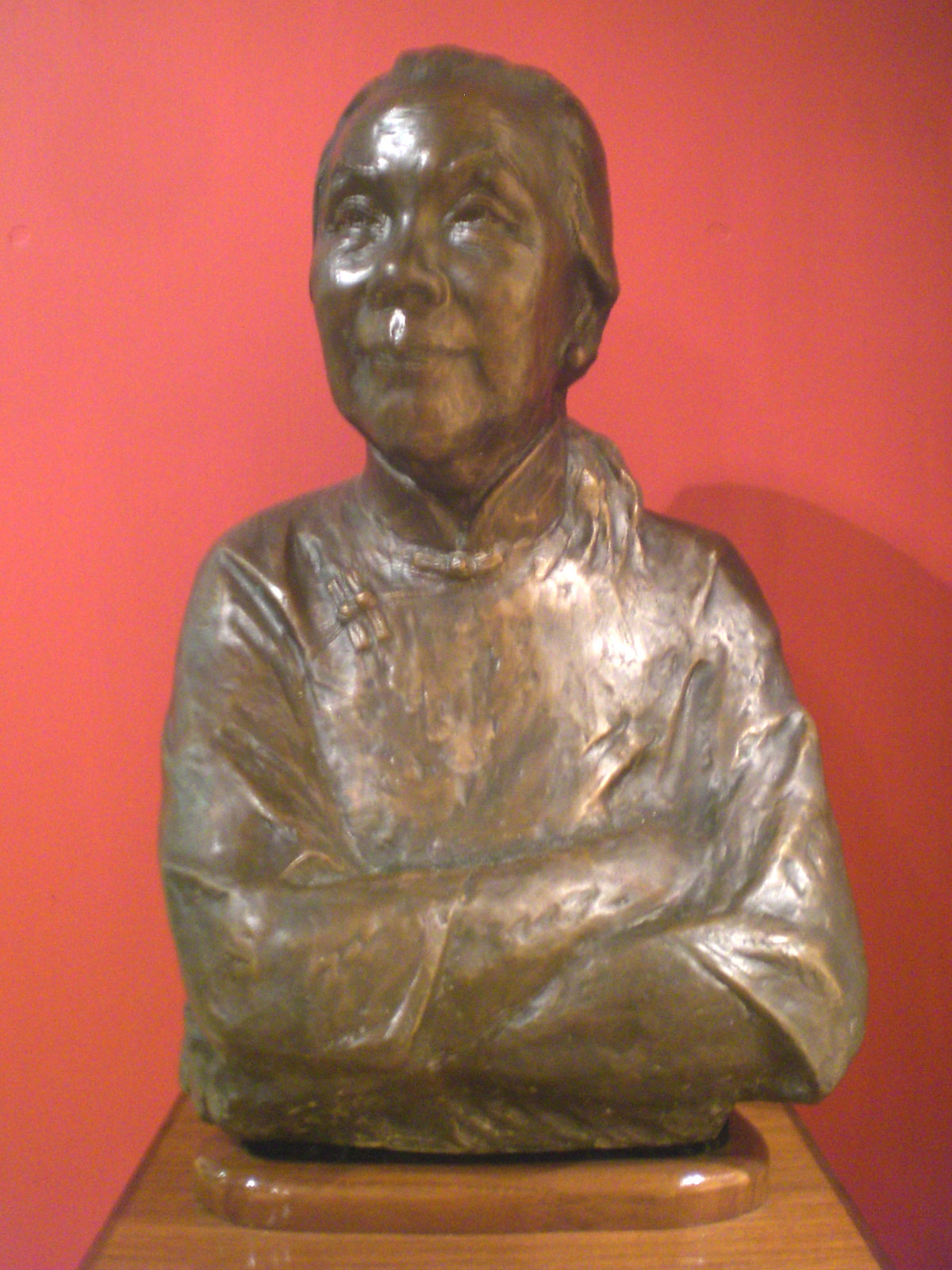
- Statue of Fang Zhaoling in the Hong Kong University Museum
- Born: 14 January 1914; Wuxi, China
- Died: 20 February 2006 (aged 92); Hong Kong
- Known for: Painting, Calligraphy
- Spouse: Fang Shin-hau (m. 1938; died 1950)

Fang Zhaoling (Chinese: 方召麐, 17 January 1914 – 20 February 2006), also known as Lydia Fong, was a Chinese painter and calligrapher.

== Biography ==
Born to a prominent industrialist and scholarly family in the city of Wuxi, Jiangsu Province, Fang Zhaoling was a precocious child with strong interests in Chinese calligraphy. She received classical education at home with tutors and a solid modern education at elite Western-style schools, attaining a sound education in both Chinese and European terms that enabled her to cross cultural boundaries with comparative ease. She was the mother of Hong Kong politician Anson Chan.

Fang lost her father when she was very young. With the support of her mother Fang began studying calligraphy and painting and in her teens, she was sent to the United Kingdom to pursue her studies. In 1937, she enrolled at University of Manchester in Britain to study European history and worked as interpreter and assistant for General Fang Zhenwu (Fang Shuping, 1885–1941), who was then traveling in Europe, North America and elsewhere to raise support for China's fight against Japan. She studied under great artists like Qian Songyan (1899-1985) and Chen Jiucun (1898-1975), Chao Shao-an and Chang Dai-chien and attended both the University of Hong Kong and the University of Oxford.

Fang Zhaoling's experiences of hardship and danger during the 1940s were formative in her views of life and art, as the artist increasingly expressed in the inscriptions on her paintings the urgent desire for peace and prosperity of the world. Following the death of her husband, she took over the family's export-import business to raise her eight children and embarked on her fifty-year career as an artist.

Fang Zhaoling's paintings embody an attempt to locate opportunities for change within the tradition sometimes looking toward the West, but without losing sight of the norms of traditional Chinese ink painting, and paying close attention to brush-and-ink painting techniques. Alluding to both Chinese calligraphy and abstract expressionism, Fang used splashy ink washes alongside gestural brushwork. Fang also added texture to rocky surfaces in her work by scrunching paper into balls and dabbing them in ink, which she used often in her work through the 1980s and beyond. She took part in a considerable number of international exhibitions, and was inspired by her extensive travels in Japan, America, Europe and Asia in the second half of the twentieth century. She returned to China (Shanghai, Beijing, Nanjing and Hefei) more frequently in the 1970s.

Fang continued to work throughout her 80s, and in 1996 received an honorary Doctor of Letters from the University of Hong Kong. She held her first solo show at the Fung Ping Shan Library in 1955, University of Hong Kong. The artist later donated a considerable number of her art works to the University of Hong Kong. In 2005, Fang donated 42 of her paintings to the Asian Art Museum of San Francisco. These are housed alongside a joint piece that she painted with Zhang Daqian.

== Personal life ==
Fang knew Fang Shin-hau (方心誥; 1913 – 1950), the son of well-known anti-Japanese general Fang Zhenwu, when she was studying in the UK and married him in 1938. They had eight children. Fang escaped with her family to Guilin, Tianjin and Shanghai in China due to war and resettled in Hong Kong in 1948. She was widowed in 1950. Her eight children were:

- John Fang — lawyer
- Anson Chan — first local to have served as the Chief Secretary of colonial Hong Kong; She also acted as Governor of Hong Kong and previously served as Chief Secretary for Administration as well as an elected Legislative Councillor of Hong Kong
- Lu Fang Ningsheng — President of a travel company and honorary president of Hong Kong–Shanghai Cultural Exchange Association
- Philip Fang — Hong Kong simultaneous interpretation specialist; once served as chief of the UN Chinese interpretation section (deceased)
- Fang Kwai-sang — banker
- Fang Lam-sang — travel company manager
- Frank Fang — medical doctor
- David Fang — Orthopaedist; chairman of Hong Kong Academy of Medicine

== Current exhibitions ==
- Women + Ink | China + Hong Kong
- Lui Shou-kwan Pioneer of New Ink: A Centenary Celebration

== Past exhibitions ==
2018

- HOPE charity exhibition

2017

- Painting Her Way – The Ink Art of Fang Zhaoling, Asia Society, Hong Kong
- DESIRING- Post 97 Hong Kong Ink Art, Alisan Fine Arts, Hong Kong

2016

- Alisan Fine Arts: Celebrating 35 Years of Promoting Chinese Contemporary Art, Hong Kong Central Library, Hong Kong

2014

- Paintings by Fang Zaholing, A Century Exhibition, Ashmolean Museum, University of Oxford, UK

2013

- Group show by Alisan Fine Arts, Hong Kong Pavilion at Masterpiece London Fair, Royal Hospital Chelsea, London, UK

2012

- Solo exhibition “Fang Zhaoling, Vigorous and Fresh Chinese Ink Painting”, Alisan Fine Arts, FINE ART ASIA, Hong Kong Exhibition & Convention Centre, Hong Kong

2008

- Hong Kong Art: Open Dialogue Exhibition Series II– “New Ink Art: Innovation and Beyond”, curated by Alice King, Hong Kong Museum of Art, Hong Kong

2006

- Solo Exhibition, Zhejiang West Lake Art Museum, Hangzhou, China

2005

- Fang Zhaoling: A Life in Painting, Asian Art Museum of San Francisco– Chong-Moon Lee Centre for Asian Art and Culture, USA

2001

- Kaleidoscope: A Group Show of Contemporary Hong Kong Art 2001 with 8 artists including Lui Shou Kwan, Fang Zhaoling and Wucius Wong, Alisan Fine Arts, Hong Kong
- Solo Exhibition, Hong Kong Central Library, Hong Kong

2000

- An Ode to Earth and Life: The World of Fang Zhaoling, Tokyo Fuji Art Museum, Japan

1999

- Works by Dr Fang Zhaoling, Soka Gakkai International of Hong Kong, Hong Kong

1998

- Exhibition, National Art Museum of China, Beijing, China

1997

- Solo exhibitions of calligraphy and painting, Shanghai Art Museum; National Art Museum of China, Beijing; Shenzhen Art Museum, China; Kulturzen-Trumvilla Sachsen, Katholische Akademie, Germany

1994

- The Passionate Realm: A Retrospective of Fang Zhaoling, Hong Kong Museum of Art, Hong Kong

1988

- Chinese Ink Painting by Fang Zhaoling, Fung Ping Shan Museum, University of Hong Kong, Hong Kong

1987

- Four-artist group exhibition with Wu Guangzhong (1919-2010), Wang Jiqian (1907-2003) and Song Wenzhi (1919-1999), Hong Kong Arts Centre, Hong Kong

1986

- Solo exhibition, Hefei Museum, Anhui, China
- Group exhibition of 40 Chinese painters from Hong Kong, Macau, overseas and mainland China, organized by Chinese University of Hong Kong and Mingpao, City Hall, Hong Kong

1985

- Four-artist group exhibition, Hong Kong Arts Centre, Hong Kong

1984

- Exhibition, Fung Ping Shan Museum, University of Hong Kong, Hong Kong
- Exhibition of Hong Kong Arts Festival, Hong Kong Arts Centre, Hong Kong
- Fang Zhaoling 70th Anniversary Exhibition, Hong Kong Arts Centre, Hong Kong

1983

- Solo exhibition, organized by Shanghai Ministry of Culture, Shanghai Art Museum, China
- Exhibition of Hong Kong Arts Festival, Hong Kong Arts Centre, Hong Kong

1982

- Exhibition, Hugh Moss Gallery, London, UK

1981

- Art’81 Exhibition, Fung Ping Shan Museum, University of Hong Kong, Hong Kong
- Solo exhibitions, arranged by the Ministry of Culture, National Art Museum of China, Beijing; Nanjing, Wuxi, China

1978

- Solo exhibitions, Hugh Moss Gallery, London, UK
- City Hall, Hong Kong

1977

- Solo exhibition, Raya Gallery, Melbourne, Australia

1975

- Solo exhibition, Mickelson Gallery, Washington, DC, USA

1974

- Exhibition, Zachary Waller Gallery, Los Angeles, USA

1973

- Solo exhibition, Mickelson Gallery, Washington, DC, USA

1972

- Solo Exhibition, Hugh Moss Gallery, London, UK

1971

- Solo exhibition, Ji Gu Zhai Art Gallery, Hong Kong

1968

- Solo exhibition, Grosvenor Gallery, London, UK

1967

- Royal Academy Summer Exhibition, London, UK
- Contemporary Chinese Painting Exhibition, Scottish National Museum of Modern Art, Edinburgh, UK

1962

- Solo exhibitions, Foyles Art Gallery, London; Durham University, UK

1961

- Solo exhibitions, Victoria Memorial Hall, Singapore; St. John's Cathedral, Hong Kong

1960

- Exhibition, Museum of University of Oregon, USA
- Solo exhibitions, Doll and Richards Gallery, Boston; Kennedy Gallery,
- New York, USA; Montreal, Canada
- Solo exhibition, De Young Memorial Museum; Chamber of Commerce,
- San Francisco, USA

1957-8

- Solo exhibitions, Oxford University, Cambridge, UK
- Ludwig-Maximilians-Universität München, Munich, Germany

1956

- Solo exhibition, Hong Kong Chinese Women's Club, Hong Kong

1955

- Solo exhibition, Fung Ping Shan Library, University of Hong Kong, Hong Kong
- Solo exhibition, sponsored by China Society, Penang, Malaysia

1953-4

- Joint exhibition with Zhao Shao’ang, Leeds University, Marlborough
- Fine Arts Gallery, London, UK
- Joint exhibitions, Vallotton Gallery, Lausanne, Switzerland;
- Musée d’Orsay, Paris, France

1951

- Joint exhibition with Yang Shanshen (1913-2004), Hu Yuki (1927- ) and Lu Canming (1892-1963, father of Lui Shou Kwan), sponsored by Singapore Art Society, Singapore; Penang, Malaysia
- 1950 Joint exhibition with Zhao Shao’ang, presented by Asahi Shimbun,
- Mitsukoshi Department Store, Tokyo, Japan, which was the first Chinese art exhibition since the war

1933

- Group Exhibition of Bailang Art Society, Wuxi, China
- Art’78 Exhibition, Fung Ping Shan Museum, University of Hong Kong, Hong Kong
- Hong Kong Artists-the Early Generation, Hong Kong Museum of Art, Hong Kong

== Awards ==
In 2003, Fang was awarded the Bronze Bauhinia Star for her accomplishments in Chinese ink painting and calligraphy.
