= Luoshen =

Goddess of the Luo River

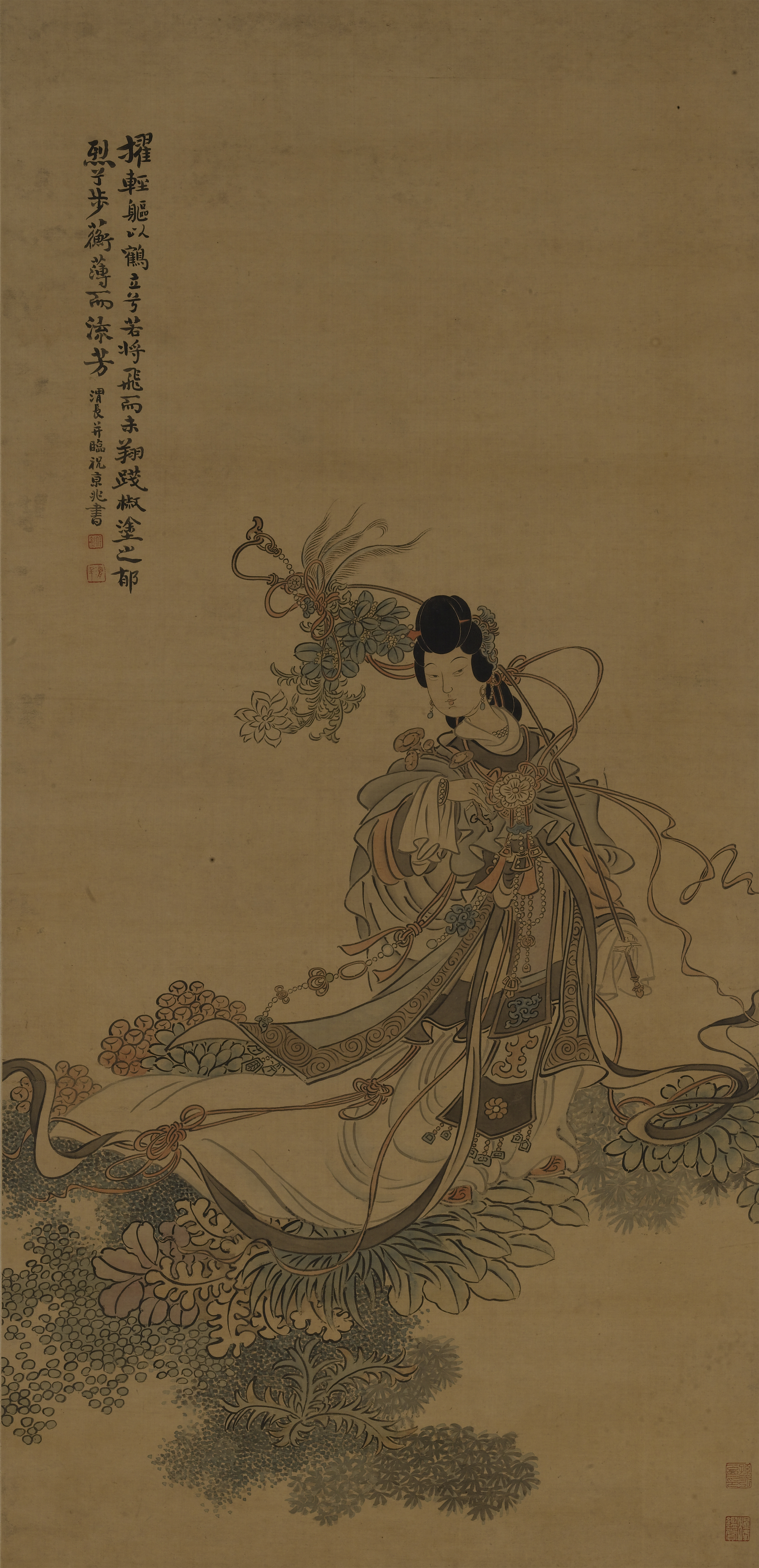
The Goddess of the Luo River, painted by Ren Xiong (1823–1857)

Luoshen (Chinese: 洛神; lit. 'The Goddess of the Luo River') is a well-known figure in Chinese literature and folklore. She is the central character in the famous poem Luoshen Fu (Chinese: 洛神賦; pinyin: Luòshén fù, also alternatively translated as Rhapsody on the luo river goddess) written by Cao Zhi, a poet from the Three Kingdoms period in ancient China. The tale of the goddess has been adapted and reimagined in various forms of Chinese art and literature throughout history, and she has become a symbol of beauty and unattainable love in Chinese culture.

== In literature and poetry ==
The goddess of the Luo River is identified with various historical figures from different dynasties in Chinese history.

According to legend, the goddess of the Luo River was Fufei, the daughter of Fuxi. Additionally, some versions of the legend state that she is Fuxi's consort. She drowned in the Luo River while crossing it and became the spirit of the Luo River.

During the Cao Wei period, Cao Zhi wrote a poem called "Fu on the Luo River Goddess". The poem contains references to the spirit of the Luo River, named Consort Fu (Chinese: 宓妃; pinyin: Fúfēi), interpreted as a proxy for Empress Zhen by those who believed in Cao Zhi's infatuation with her. Because of this prose poem, his sister-in-law, Lady Zhen, was regarded as the reincarnation of the goddess of the Luo River. The poem portrays the goddess of the Luo River as a captivating and exquisite figure gracefully dancing by the water's edge. Cao Zhi, the younger brother of Empress Zhen's husband, is said to have been captivated by her beauty, inspiring him to pen the verses as a testament to his admiration and yearning for her. Cao Zhi's love for Empress Zhen went beyond the ordinary. As a poet, he understood the qualities and spirituality she sought. Unlike his brother Cao Pi, Lady Zhen's husband, who focused solely on political power and displayed cruelty, Cao Zhi embodied kindness and artistic sensibility.

A tradition dating back to at least as far as an undated, anonymous note edited into the Tang dynasty writer Li Shan's annotated Wen Xuan had Cao Zhi meeting the ghost of the recently deceased Empress Zhen and writing a poem originally titled Gan Zhen Fu (感甄賦; Rhapsody on Being Moved by Lady Zhen). Afterwards, Cao Rui found this poem about his uncle's love for his mother and changed the title to Luo Shen Fu (洛神賦), which could be translated as Rhapsody on the Goddess of the Luo or Rhapsody on the Divine Luo, this second interpretation presumably referencing Lady Zhen's personal name, Luo. If true, this would be a forename unique to early China, as the Chinese character 洛 has been a toponym since it entered the language.

In the Chu Ci • Heavenly Questions, it is recorded: "The Emperor sent Hou Yi to reform the people of Xia. Why did he shoot Hebo and take his wife Luoshen?" The passage is from the poem "Heavenly Questions" in the Chu Ci anthology. It tells the story of Hou Yi, a legendary archer who was sent by the Emperor to reform the people of Xia. He was a skilled archer and hunter, and he used his skills to rid the world of many monsters and pests. However, he also became arrogant and tyrannical, and he eventually killed Hebo, the god of Yellow River and took his wife Luoshen as his own. Thus, Luoshen is considered to be the wife of Hebo.

Tang dynasty poet Li Shangyin wrote a poem titled "Dong'e Wang" (The Prince of Dong'e) which goes:

Chinese text

国事分明属灌均
西陵魂断夜来人
君王不得为天子
半为当时赋洛神。

Translation:
English translation

The state affairs are clearly in the hands of Guan Jun
A visitor from the west comes at night, his soul broken
The prince cannot be the emperor
Half of his heart is devoted to composing odes to the Goddess of the Luo River.

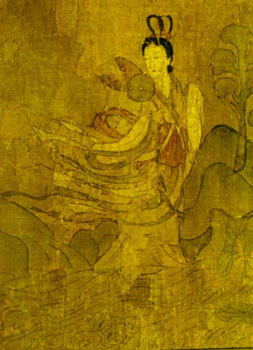
The Goddess of Luo River in the Painting of Luoshen by Gu Kaizhi, Eastern Jin dynasty

During the Warring States period, in the Chu Ci • Li Sao (Songs of Chu • Encountering Sorrow), it is recorded:

I command the god of clouds, Fenglong, to ride the colorful clouds,
Seeking the whereabouts of Consort Mi.
I take off my jade pendant, intending to make a vow.
I send Jianxiu, a minister of Fuxi, to act as a matchmaker.
But the situation is unpredictable.
Suddenly, she becomes indifferent and unresponsive.
In the evening, Consort Mi returns to stay at Qiongshi.
In the morning, she washes her hair in the Weipan.
Consort Mi is proud and arrogant due to her beauty.
Indulging in pleasure and revelry all day long.
Though she is beautiful, she lacks propriety.
So, I forsake her and seek another.

In the Huainanzi • Chuzhen Xun (淮南子·俶真训), it is recorded: With Fufei as my concubine and Zhinü as my wife, what in the world could be enough to keep my heart?.

According to the Collected Explanations of the Li Sao (离骚纂义), Qu Fu noted that later generations regarded Fufei as the daughter of Fuxi. However, since she is referred to as "fei" (consort or concubine), it would be inappropriate to use this term for a daughter. Therefore, it is clear that Fufei must be a consort of the Fuxi.

== Festival ==
In April 2016, the first Luoyang Sunshine Water World Luoshen Cultural Lantern Festival opened in the Luoyang Sunshine Water World scenic area.

In October 2018, the first Luoyang·Shenlingzhai·Luoshen Red Leaves Food and Culture Tourism Festival was held in the Shenlingzhai scenic area of Luoyang.

== In popular culture ==
- Portrayed by Ada Choi in 2002 Hong Kong television series Where the Legend Begins
- Portrayed by Wen Zhengrong in 2005 Chinese television series Flying To the Moon
- Portrayed by Li Yixiao in 2013 Chinese television series Legend of Goddess Luo
- Luoshen is the creative impression of a fictional character and virtual singer, Luo Tianyi
- Luoshen was a playable character in the 2017 mobile card game Summoner of the Gods (封神召唤师)
