= Luoshen Fu paintings =

Chinese narrative painting traditionally attributed to Gu Kaizhi

- 洛神賦圖 (Chinese)
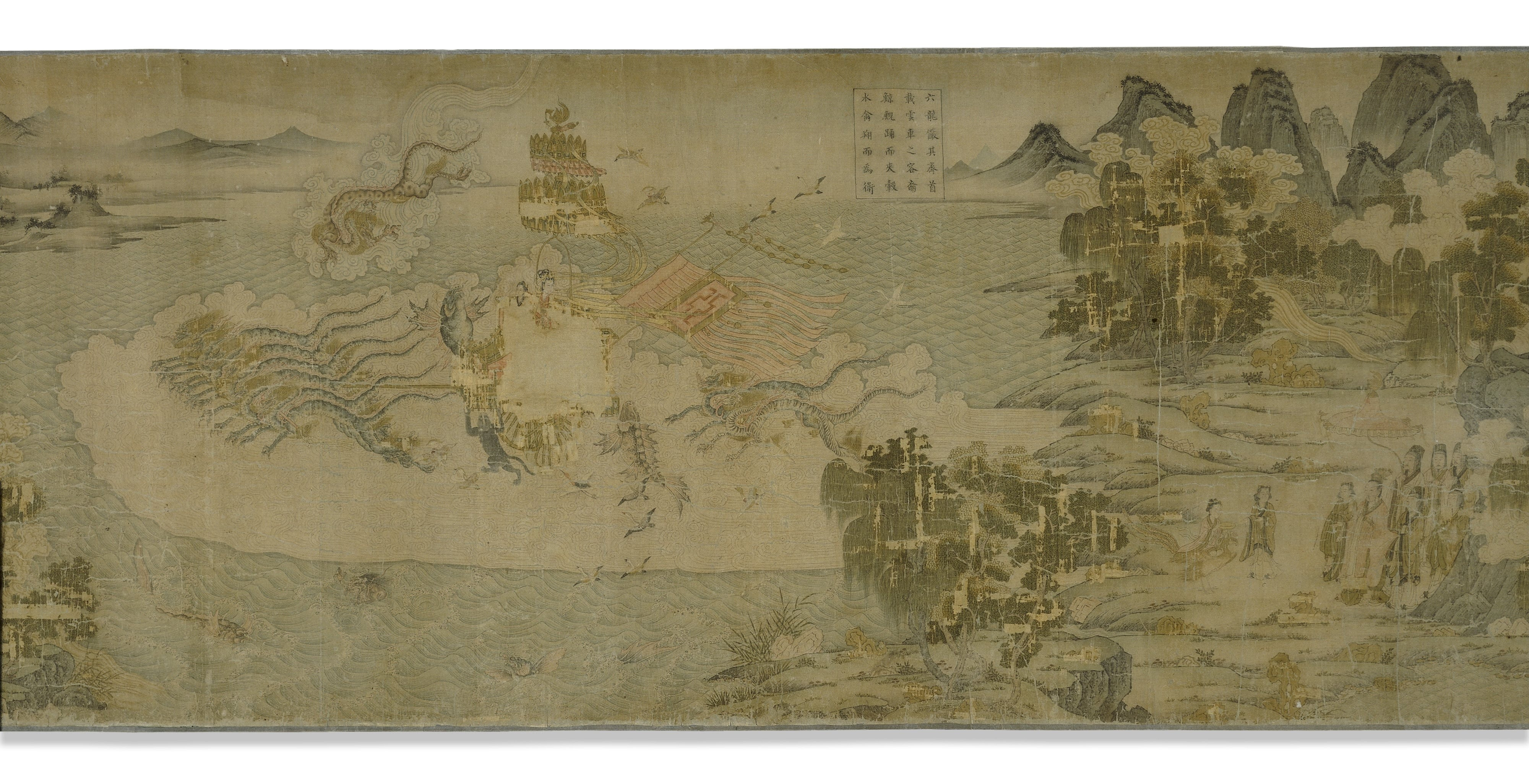
- Part of the British Copy
- Artists: Traditionally attributed to Gu Kaizhi; surviving versions by anonymous copyists
- Year: Original composition traditionally attributed to the 4th century; principal surviving copies date from the 12th and 13th centuries
- Type: Handscroll
- Medium: Ink and colour on silk
- Subject: Cao Zhi's Ode to Luoshen
- Location: Palace Museum, Liaoning Provincial Museum, National Museum of Asian Art and other collections

Luoshen Fu paintings (traditional Chinese: 洛神賦圖; simplified Chinese: 洛神赋图; pinyin: Luòshénfù Tú), also translated as Nymph of the Luo River paintings or The Goddess of the Luo River paintings, is the conventional title of a group of Chinese narrative paintings based on the fu poem Ode to Luoshen (Chinese: 洛神賦) by the Cao Wei prince and poet Cao Zhi. The lost original composition is traditionally attributed to Gu Kaizhi, an influential painter of the Eastern Jin dynasty, but none of the surviving versions can be securely identified as his own work.

Several later copies and adaptations survive, most notably Song-dynasty handscrolls in the Palace Museum in Beijing, the Liaoning Provincial Museum in Shenyang and the Freer Gallery of Art in Washington, D.C. Other related versions are held by the National Palace Museum in Taipei and the British Museum. Although the individual scrolls differ in completeness, arrangement and style, they preserve a common pictorial tradition in which Cao Zhi's encounter with the goddess is represented as a sequence of episodes unfolding across a continuous landscape.

The painting tradition is regarded as an important example of early Chinese narrative paintings. Its repeated figures, fine contour lines, restricted colour washes and comparatively schematic landscape have also made the surviving copies significant sources for the study of Chinese figure painting and the early development of Chinese landscape painting.

== Literary background ==
The paintings illustrate Cao Zhi's Ode to the Luoshen, traditionally dated to around 222. According to the preface to the poem, Cao composed it after attending the imperial court and crossing the Luo River on his return journey. He recalls an account of the river goddess Fufei and describes an imaginary meeting between the mortal prince and the supernatural woman.

In the poem, Cao Zhi first sees the goddess beside the river and describes her appearance through comparisons with birds, dragons, clouds, flowers and moonlight. He becomes attracted to her and offers a jade pendant as a token of affection. The goddess responds, but the prince begins to doubt whether a lasting union is possible. A procession of female spirits and mythical creatures then gathers around her, after which she departs in a cloud-borne carriage drawn by six dragons. Cao remains beside the river and later attempts to follow her, but the encounter ends because a human and a deity cannot inhabit the same realm.

Later interpretations frequently associated the poem with Lady Zhen, the wife of Cao Zhi's elder brother Cao Pi, but the historical basis of this identification has been questioned. The paintings themselves generally present the narrative as a mythological encounter rather than identifying the goddess as a historical woman.

== Attribution and dating ==
Gu Kaizhi was celebrated in later Chinese art history as a master of figure painting and as a theorist who emphasized the expression of a subject's inner character through outward form. Traditional catalogues attributed the original design of Godness of the Luo River to him, and the association became central to the later reputation of the painting. No surviving scroll, however, bears a reliable signature or contemporary inscription by Gu.

The surviving handscrolls were produced centuries after Gu's death. Museums therefore normally describe them as Song- or Ming-dynasty copies of a composition traditionally attributed to him. The Palace Museum dates its principal Beijing scroll to the Song dynasty on the evidence of its silk, pigments and painting technique, while the National Museum of Asian Art dates its Freer copy to approximately 1150–1250.

== Composition and narrative ==
The best-known versions employ continuous narrative, a method in which successive moments appear within the same uninterrupted pictorial space. The scroll is viewed gradually from right to left. Cao Zhi, the goddess and their attendants appear repeatedly, allowing the viewer to follow the progression of the poem without dividing the work into framed panels.

In the opening episodes, Cao Zhi and his attendants arrive beside the river. The prince looks towards the goddess, who appears at a distance among water, rocks and trees. The difference between the still, formally arranged human party and the floating ribbons and garments of the goddess visually separates the earthly and supernatural realms. Their gazes and gestures establish a connection even though they are rarely placed immediately beside one another.

Later passages show the goddess moving across the river, meeting other female spirits and receiving Cao's declaration of affection. Mythical animals and aquatic beings transform the landscape into a supernatural environment. Among the creatures represented are dragons, fantastic fish and water birds described in Cao Zhi's poem. The goddess eventually rides away in a cloud carriage drawn by six dragons, accompanied by an elaborate procession.

The final episodes return attention to Cao Zhi. In more complete versions, he travels by boat, waits beside the river during the night and prepares to continue his journey. His repeated backward glances and hesitation convey his unwillingness to leave the place of the encounter. The narrative therefore moves from wonder and attraction to separation and remembrance.

Rocks, trees, riverbanks and stretches of water serve both as settings and as transitions between episodes. They separate successive moments without interrupting the visual continuity of the scroll. This arrangement allows a literary narrative, which unfolds through time, to be translated into a painting that occupies a continuous physical surface.

== Style and technique ==
The surviving principal scrolls are painted in ink and mineral or vegetable colours on silk. Figures and landscape forms are first defined by outlines and then filled with comparatively light colour washes. The contours of the bodies and clothing are slender and controlled, while long scarves and ribbons curve around the goddess and other supernatural figures to suggest movement through the air.

The landscape is less naturalistic than the figures. Mountains, trees and riverbanks are frequently much smaller than the people placed beside them, and spatial depth is limited. Trees may be represented as simplified trunks with branches extending like outstretched fingers, while rocks are enclosed by contours and filled with colour rather than modelled through the textured brushstrokes characteristic of later Chinese landscape painting.

These differences in scale are not necessarily errors of observation. The landscape functions primarily as a visual stage that identifies locations, separates narrative episodes and directs the viewer's movement through the scroll. The relative size of the figures also reflects their narrative importance. Cao Zhi and the goddess remain easily recognizable even when the surrounding river and mountains change.

The treatment of the figures has traditionally been associated with Gu Kaizhi's reputation for fine, continuous line drawing. Nevertheless, stylistic details in the surviving copies reflect the periods in which they were produced. The scrolls therefore preserve later painters' conceptions of early art as well as possible elements inherited from an older composition.

== Surviving versions ==
=== Palace Museum version ===
The principal version in the Palace Museum is a Song-dynasty handscroll measuring 27.1 centimetres in height and 572.8 centimetres in length. It is painted in colour on silk and contains neither the text of Cao Zhi's poem nor a signature by the painter. The museum considers it a Song copy that nevertheless preserves stylistic features associated with painting before the Tang dynasty.

The scroll begins with an inscription by the Qianlong Emperor reading Miao ru haodian (妙入毫巔), praising the refinement of its brushwork. It is followed by calligraphy and colophons traditionally associated with figures including Zhao Mengfu, Li Kan, Yu Ji, Shen Du and Wu Kuan, although the Palace Museum identifies several of these additions as spurious. The scroll also bears seals from the Qing imperial collection and was recorded in the imperial catalogue Shiqu Baoji.

=== Liaoning Provincial Museum version ===
The Liaoning Provincial Museum holds another comparatively complete Song-dynasty copy. It depicts most of the principal episodes of the poem and is especially important for the study of the relationship between Cao Zhi's text and the sequential organization of the painting. The goddess appears repeatedly in a consistent hairstyle and costume, while the recurring image of Cao Zhi guides the viewer through the narrative.

The museum describes the handscroll as one of several surviving versions traditionally connected with Gu Kaizhi and considers it to preserve many features of the early composition. Because of the fragility of the silk and pigments, the original scroll is displayed only for restricted periods.

=== Freer Gallery version ===
The Freer Gallery of Art's scroll, accession number F1914.53, is dated to the Southern Song dynasty, approximately 1150–1250. It measures 24.2 by 310.9 centimetres and is painted in ink and colour on silk. Only about half of its former pictorial length survives, but it remains a major record of the early composition.

The Freer version contains colophons and collector's seals added during its later history. Its first major colophon is by the Ming-dynasty painter, calligrapher and theorist Dong Qichang, who accepted the traditional attribution and praised the work. The scroll entered the collection of Charles Lang Freer and subsequently became part of the Smithsonian Institution.

=== Other versions ===
The National Palace Museum in Taipei preserves an album leaf traditionally attributed to Gu Kaizhi that depicts the goddess riding in a carriage drawn by six dragons. The work has no painter's signature. Its taut outlines, curling clouds, small trees and schematic riverbanks retain motifs associated with early figure and landscape painting, although the leaf represents only a selected episode rather than the complete narrative.

The British Museum owns another handscroll catalogued as Nymph of the Luo River, museum number 1930,1015,0.2. It is attributed to an anonymous artist working after Gu Kaizhi and is generally associated with the Ming dynasty, although earlier dates have also appeared in its cataloguing history. Additional copies and fragments in Beijing, Taipei and Washington demonstrate that the composition circulated in more than one form and was not transmitted through a single unchanging sequence.

== Interpretation and significance ==
The painting has often been interpreted as a visual expression of unattainable desire. Cao Zhi and the goddess are attracted to each other, yet their physical separation within the composition anticipates the impossibility of their union. Water, clouds and empty spaces function both as landscape elements and as boundaries between mortal and divine existence.

The repeated representation of the same figures also makes the work an important case in studies of pictorial time. Rather than selecting one climactic instant, the scroll incorporates numerous moments into one landscape. The viewer reconstructs the story by gradually opening the handscroll and recognizing the protagonists as they reappear in new situations.

Chen Pao-Chen's study of later paintings of the subject identifies three broad modes of representation. Some works preserve the continuous narrative structure of the handscrolls, others divide the story into a sequence of self-contained scenes, and still others isolate the goddess as a single emblematic figure. These later transformations shifted attention from Cao Zhi's complete narrative towards the visual ideal of the elegant female immortal.

The surviving copies have also played an important role in histories of Chinese landscape painting. Their trees, rocks, water and mountains are not autonomous subjects, but they create a coherent environment in which the narrative can unfold. They therefore document a stage in which landscape forms were becoming structurally important while remaining subordinate to human figures and literary storytelling.

Because the attributed Eastern Jin original is lost, the scrolls cannot be used as direct, unaltered evidence of Gu Kaizhi's individual brushwork. Their importance instead lies in the long process of copying, adaptation and connoisseurship through which an early literary composition was preserved and reimagined. Collectively, the versions of Nymph of the Luo River connect the history of poetry, figure painting, landscape painting and the Chinese narrative handscroll.
