= Philip Fang =

方順生 Philip Fang
- Born: 28 March 1941; Hong Kong
- Died: 3 November 2013 (aged 72); Tung Chung, Hong Kong
- Occupation: Simultaneous interpreter

Fang Shun-sang
- Traditional Chinese: 方順生
- Simplified Chinese: 方顺生
Transcriptions
Standard Mandarin
- Hanyu Pinyin: Fāng Shùnshēng

Philip Fang Shun-sang (Chinese: 方順生; 28 March 1941 – 3 November 2013) was a Hong Kong simultaneous interpreter. He provided interpretation services in the United Nations (UN) from 1971 to 1999, having served as chief of its Chinese interpretation section.

Fang received his education in Hong Kong, the United States and the United Kingdom. Before he became chief of UN Chinese interpretation section, he served in the UN as a simultaneous interpreter and was stationed in New York City and Geneva.

In his later years, Fang suffered kidney disease. In 2011, he openly supported the prerequisite of being patriotic to China to be a popularly-elected Chief Executive of Hong Kong, while calling his sister Anson Chan, a pan-democrat, one of Hong Kong's "Gang of Four". Fang fell from his apartment on 3 November 2013 at the age of 72; he was suspected of committing suicide because of illness.

== Life ==
=== Early years ===
Philip Fang was born in Hong Kong on 28 March 1941. With ancestors from Shou County, Anhui, he was the fourth child of Fang Shin-hau (方心誥; 1913–1950) and Fang Zhaoling (1914–2006). Fang's father was a textile merchant and the son of Fang Zhenwu (1885–1941), a well-known Kuomintang general who fought against the Japanese during the Second Sino-Japanese War. His mother was a Chinese painter and was apprenticed by Chao Shao-an and Chang Dai-chien. Sir Harry Fang (1923–2009), Shin-hau's younger brother, was a renowned orthopaedist, whose daughter Christine Fang (方敏生) is a former chief executive of The Hong Kong Council of Social Service. Fang had seven siblings; his sister Anson Chan served as Chief Secretary of Hong Kong during British rule, and later as Chief Secretary for Administration as well as an elected Legislative Councillor of the Hong Kong SAR government under Chinese sovereignty.

=== Overseas career ===
Fang moved to mainland China with his family at a very young age to avoid war. They resettled in Hong Kong in 1948 due to political instability in the mainland. In 1950, his father Shin-hau died of illness and his family had to be dependent on his father's mother and brother. Fang received his secondary education at Wah Yan College, Hong Kong. He completed his secondary education in 1960 and went on to further his studies in the US. He pursued advanced studies at the University of Surrey in 1966, majoring in language. He graduated in 1970 with a Bachelor of Science degree.

Upon graduation from the University of Surrey, Fang joined the UN Interpretation Department in 1971 as a British subject. In the same year, the UN General Assembly passed a resolution to allow the People's Republic of China to replace the Republic of China as China's representative in the UN. Fang initially served in the UN Secretariat in New York City as a simultaneous interpreter. In 1979, he was promoted to senior simultaneous interpreter at the UN Office at Geneva. He later worked as chief of the UN Chinese interpretation section. In 1999, he applied for early retirement to take care of his ageing mother Fang Zhaoling. In his twenty-eight years of service in the UN, Fang had been working and living abroad, including in New York and Geneva. His interpretation services primarily involved Chinese, English and Russian.

=== Late years ===
After his return to Hong Kong, Fang had been taking care of his ageing mother, until she died in 2006 at the age of 92. He became involved in a dispute with his siblings with regard to the allocation of some paintings and property left by his mother; In 2011, Philip and Fang Lam-sang (方林生), his brother released a statement, accusing their brothers John and David of embezzling their mother's legacy. Anson Chan, their sister, tried to play the role of a mediator, but her siblings' relationships worsened.

Furthermore, Fang was pro-Beijing, as opposed to his sister Anson, a pan-democrat. He rarely made public his views on politics but, in 2011, he wrote an open letter published in the South China Morning Post, supporting the criterion that the popularly-elected Chief Executive of Hong Kong must be patriotic to China. He even termed Anson, Martin Lee, Jimmy Lai and Joseph Zen as Hong Kong's "Gang of Four", and stated that the four as well as Audrey Eu-led Civic Party were challenging the SAR government. The letter sparked media attention.

In his late years, Fang suffered from mood disorder as he was affected by his kidney disease and the death of his mother. He received medical treatment in Sydney and thereafter lived alone at Tung Chung in Hong Kong. Fang fell from his 16th-storey apartment at around HKT 21:00, 3 November 2013. He was brought to Yan Chai Hospital and pronounced dead an hour later, at the age of 72. He was suspected of committing suicide by jumping off his residence because of illness.

After his death, his brothers went to Kwai Chung Public Mortuary to identify him. A low-profile Catholic funeral was conducted on 10 November 2013 at the Hong Kong Funeral Home with around seventy members of the Fang clan attending. His remains were later cremated.

== Personal life ==
Fang and his family were Catholic. He married Cynthia Fong, a Chinese American, with whom he had two daughters. Fang lived alone in Hong Kong in his later years while his wife and daughters stayed in the United States. After his death, his wife and one of his daughters attended his funeral in Hong Kong; his other daughter was unable to attend as she was heavily pregnant.

== See also ==
- Fang Zhenwu's family tree (in Chinese)
