= Luo Qilan =

- 駱綺蘭
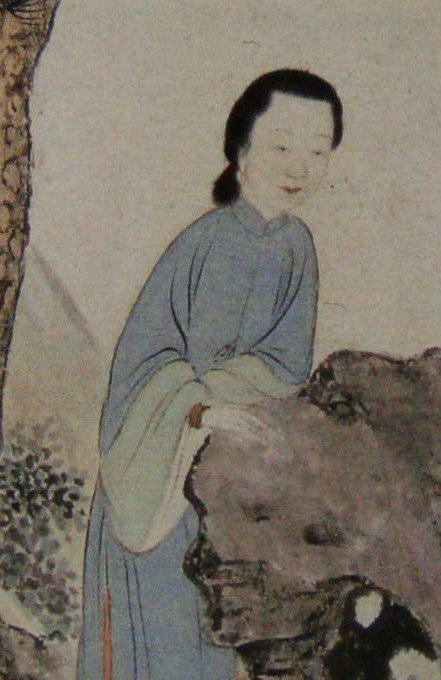
- portrait by Ding Yicheng, detail from Spring View at Ping Mountain
- Born: 1755; Jurong
- Died: 1820 (aged 64–65)
- Occupation: Poet, painter
- Works: Ting qiu xuan shi ji
- Spouse(s): Gong Shizhi

Luo Qilan (Chinese: 駱綺蘭; 1755-1820), also known by the courtesy name Peixiang (佩香) and the art name Qiuting (秋亭), was a Chinese Qing Dynasty painter and poet.

Luo Qilan was born in 1755 in the village of Juqu in present day Jurong, Jiangsu. She married Gong Shizhi. The couple later moved to Nanjing, which had a thriving artistic scene in the 18th century, but when they preferred a quieter existence, they moved to Dantu. Gong Shizhi died before Luo Qilan's 40th birthday. Widowhood could be financially precarious, but Luo Qilan adopted a daughter and created an independent and vibrant artistic life. She studied painting and poetry under three illustrious teachers: Wang Wenzhi, Yuan Mei, Zeng Yu.

A key part of her artistic life was the tihuashi 題畫詩, poems written about paintings and even inscribed on the paintings themselves. She exchanged these with and solicited them from other poets, and included many of them in her three anthologies, all of which were titled as from or about the Tingqiu, or Listening-to-Autumn, studio. Her first was a collection of her own works, Poems from the Tingqiu Studio (Tingqiuxuan shiji 聽秋軒詩集, 1795). Her anthology of poems by over ninety male poets, Poems of Tribute to the Tingqiu Studio (Tingqiuxuan zengyan 聽秋軒贈言, 1796), included works of praise to and about her, many of them from prominent figures including Wu Yun, Zhaolian, Qinglin, Wu Xiqi, and her teachers. Her anthology of women's poetry, Poems to the Tingqiu Studio from My Companions in Women’s Quarters (Tingqiuxuan guizhong tongren ji 聽秋軒閨中同人集, 1797), served to promote the work of lesser known writers and began with a preface where Luo Qilan frankly discussed the difficulties faced by female artists.

One of her now-lost paintings, Teaching My Daughter by Autumn Lamplight, was the subject of over seventy tihuashi. Of the paintings definitively attributed to Luo Qilan, only five individual paintings, all of plants, and an album of eight leaves remain. The album and her hanging scrolls Plum Blossoms (1799), Three-Blossom Flower, Herbaceous Peony (1795), and Camellia, Plum, and Narcissus (1795) are in the Palace Museum in Beijing and a painted fan, Orchids after Yun Shouping, is in the Cheng Xun Tang Collection. Luo Qilan herself was depicted in at least two paintings in her own lifetime: Ding Yicheng's Viewing Mount Ping in Springtime (Pingshan chunwang tu) and Master Cui's A Group Portrait of Luo Qilan, Qian Lin, and Cao Ciqing.
