= Huangchu =

Huangchu was a Chinese era name used by several emperors of China. It may refer to:

- Huangchu (黃初, 220–226), era name used by Cao Pi, emperor of Cao Wei
- Huangchu (皇初, 394–399), era name used by Yao Xing, emperor of Later Qin
