= Qian Songyan =

Chinese artist

Qian Songyan (Chinese 錢松岩; born September 11, 1899, in Yixing, Jiangsu Province; died September 4, 1985, in Nanjing) was a Chinese painter. He represents the “New Nanjing (Jinling) Art Style”. He was executive director of the Association of Chinese Artists, Honorary Chairman of the Jiangsu Branch of the Association of Chinese Artists, and President of the Jiangsu Academy of Chinese Painting. In addition he was elected to be a representative in the National People’s Congress for many years.

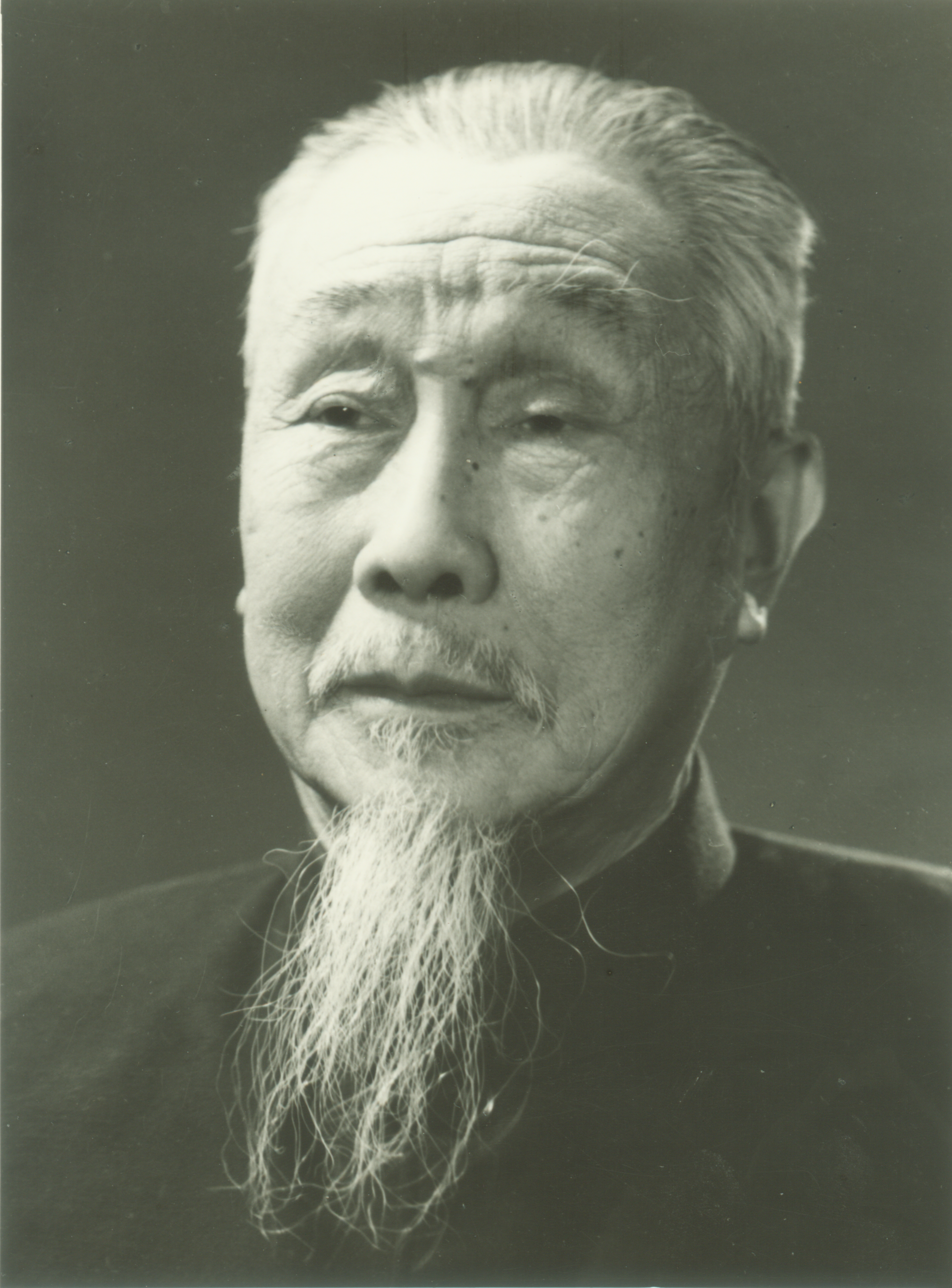
Qian Songyan 1978

== Life ==
=== Childhood, adolescence, personal and family life ===
Qian Songyan was born in 1899 in Hushu, a small farming village near Yixing in the Jiangsu Province. His father, grandfather, and great-grandfather were all scholars and socially recognized as teachers. At the age of 8 he attended the private village school of his father Qian Shaoqi and developed a strong interest in painting and calligraphy.

After the 1911 Xinhai revolution, his father was appointed principal of Yangxiang’s First Elementary School. The school’s curriculum was not very challenging for Qian Songyan, so he dropped out and began an independent five-year study program, which split his time between practical work in the fields and studying the theory and techniques of traditional painting. At age 15, he created a painting with the hazy mountains of his hometown. During this time he created many works on village life and was soon known in the region as “The Little Painter". At 15, he left home and attended the Third Senior Primary School of Yixing in Guanlin, 30 kilometers away from home. In August 1918, at the age of 19, he was admitted to the Third Provincial College of Education in Wuxi, where he was tutored by artists such as Hu Tinglu and Wu Guandai.

In 1922 he went back to his home village and married Qin Chunli. They had 4 children. His eldest daughter, Zijun, was born in Suzhou in 1926, where he was teaching at the time. His second daughter, XinLan, was born in 1932 in Wuxi, followed by his son Xishan, in 1934, and his third daughter Xinmei, in 1936. On September 7, 1937, Wuxi fell to the Japanese. Qian Songyan and his family took refuge in his hometown of Yixing.

He lived in Wuxi from 1938 to 1962 and worked as professor of painting and the language arts. In 1939 he moved into his newly renovated home and named his study “QiLu” and “Nan Guo Cao Tang”. In November 1962 he moved to his residence in Nanjing, to No. 117, Zhongyang Road. His personal and artistic life were greatly affected during the Chinese Cultural Revolution (1966–76), forcing him to abandon painting until 1972. In 1967 he was accused of being “a major landowner, bureaucrat, and capitalist” by the revolutionary committees. He suffered greatly from the confiscation of his property, personal accusations. and slander that led to a mandatory “re-education through labor”. In 1968, at the age of 69, he was sent to Zhaos Village in Jintan to do physical labor. This included breaking ice with bare hands and washing vegetables during the harsh winter. Both his hands developed arthritis. After an incident that rendered him unconscious, he was allowed to return to Nanjing to recover.

==== Illness and late life ====
Shortly thereafter, while 70 years old, he was sent to the 57th cadre school (ideological-guidance camp), in the suburbs of Zhenjiang. Over there he secretly painted on whatever he could find, often in rough conditions. Occasionally he would talk to the writer Zhao Pei, another victim of the Cultural Revolution, while doing field work. On February 6, 1971, he was allowed to leave the cadre school and return to Nanjing. In June 1978 he suffered a heat stroke but was able to recover and continued painting.

His wife, Qin Chunli, died on January 21, 1984, from a cerebral hemorrhage at the age of 81. Soon after, in March of the same year, Qian Songyan was hospitalized due to swollen legs and a loss of appetite and was diagnosed with stomach cancer. On April 6, he had an operation that removed 90 percent of his stomach. He was released from the hospital in late June and moved to the Zhong Shan Ling Sanatorium.

On May 30, 1985, he developed a high fever from pneumonia and was taken to the hospital unconscious. On August 22, the stomach cancer had spread to the liver and bile duct, causing cirrhosis of the liver. When he regained consciousness on August 25, he asked about the main news that had happened in the country. On September 4, 1985, seven days before his 87th birthday, Qian Songyan died at 5:08 am at the age of 86.

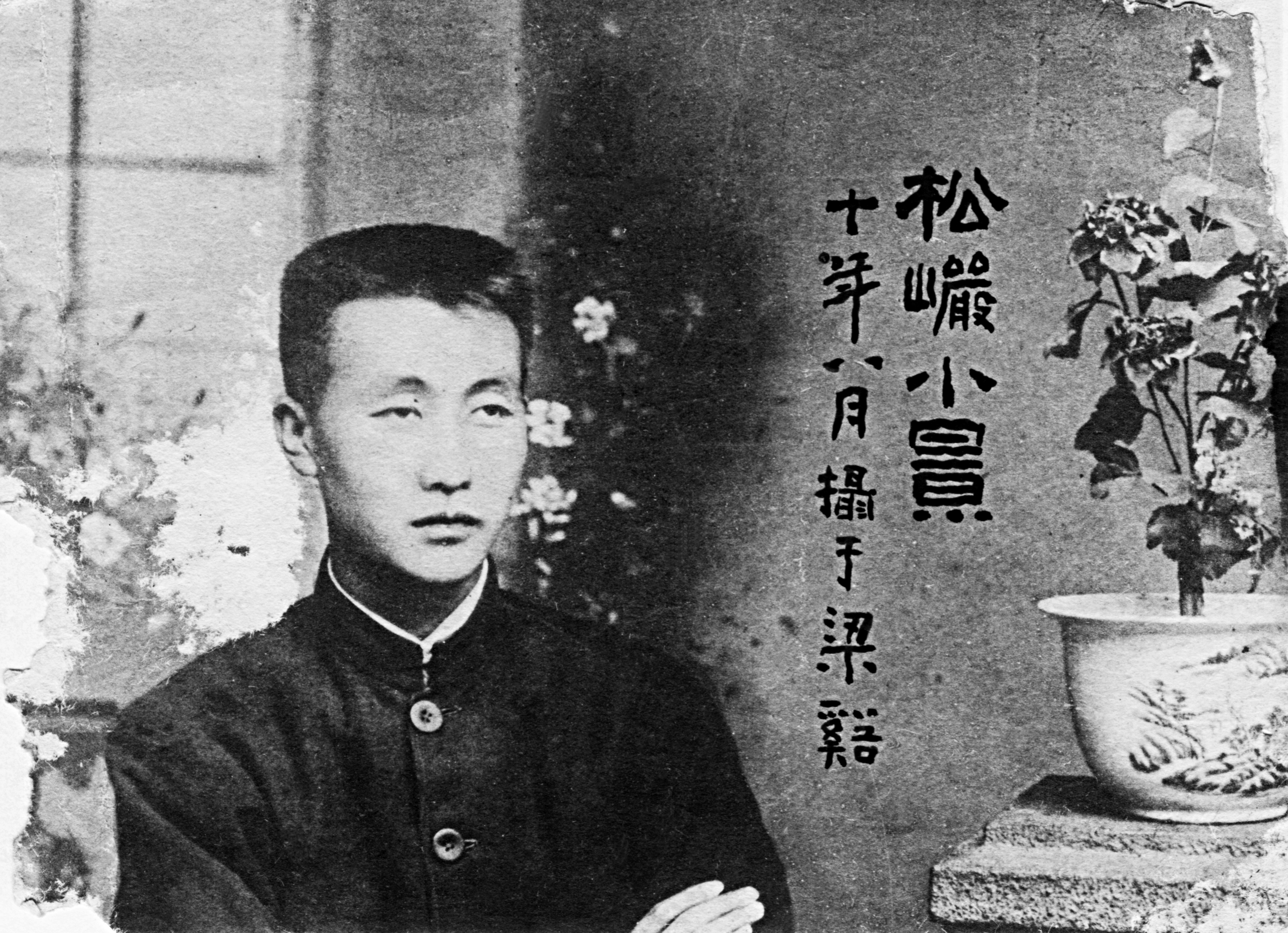
Qian Songyan 1921

=== Professional life ===
==== Education of Qian Songyan ====
In 1923, he graduated from the Wuxi College of Education. Because of his excellence he received 6 job offers. Although the college advised him to go to university or to study abroad, he rejected politely and went to Suzhou to teach Chinese language, history and painting. He stayed there for four years.

In August 1927, he accepted the position of principal at a school in Liyang, but in February 1928, he transitioned to the Wuxi School of Fine Arts, where he taught landscape painting and poetry. He stayed there until July 1931, when he switched again to teach at the Wuxi University of Education. He participated in the 1st National Art Exhibition in Shanghai in April 1929 and caused a sensation in the art scene in Wuxi.

In 1933, he and Chen Jiucun founded the ZhenNan Correspondence School of Fine Arts. In 1937, the Wuxi School of Education was destroyed by Japanese bombs in the course of the Second Sino-Japanese War and Wuxi fell to the Japanese. After taking refuge in his hometown of Yixing for a year, he returned to Wuxi in 1938 and first taught at the university there until January 1941. As early as the 1940s, he grew famous from the sale of his paintings, which he drew under the name “Master of QiLu”. Landscapes, birds, flowers, and chrysanthemums were the main subjects of his works.

In October 1945, a month after the occupying Japanese army formally surrendered to the Chinese, he was able to return to the university, which had closed in January 1941 due to the Japanese occupation, and taught there until 1957.

==== The painter Qian Songyan ====
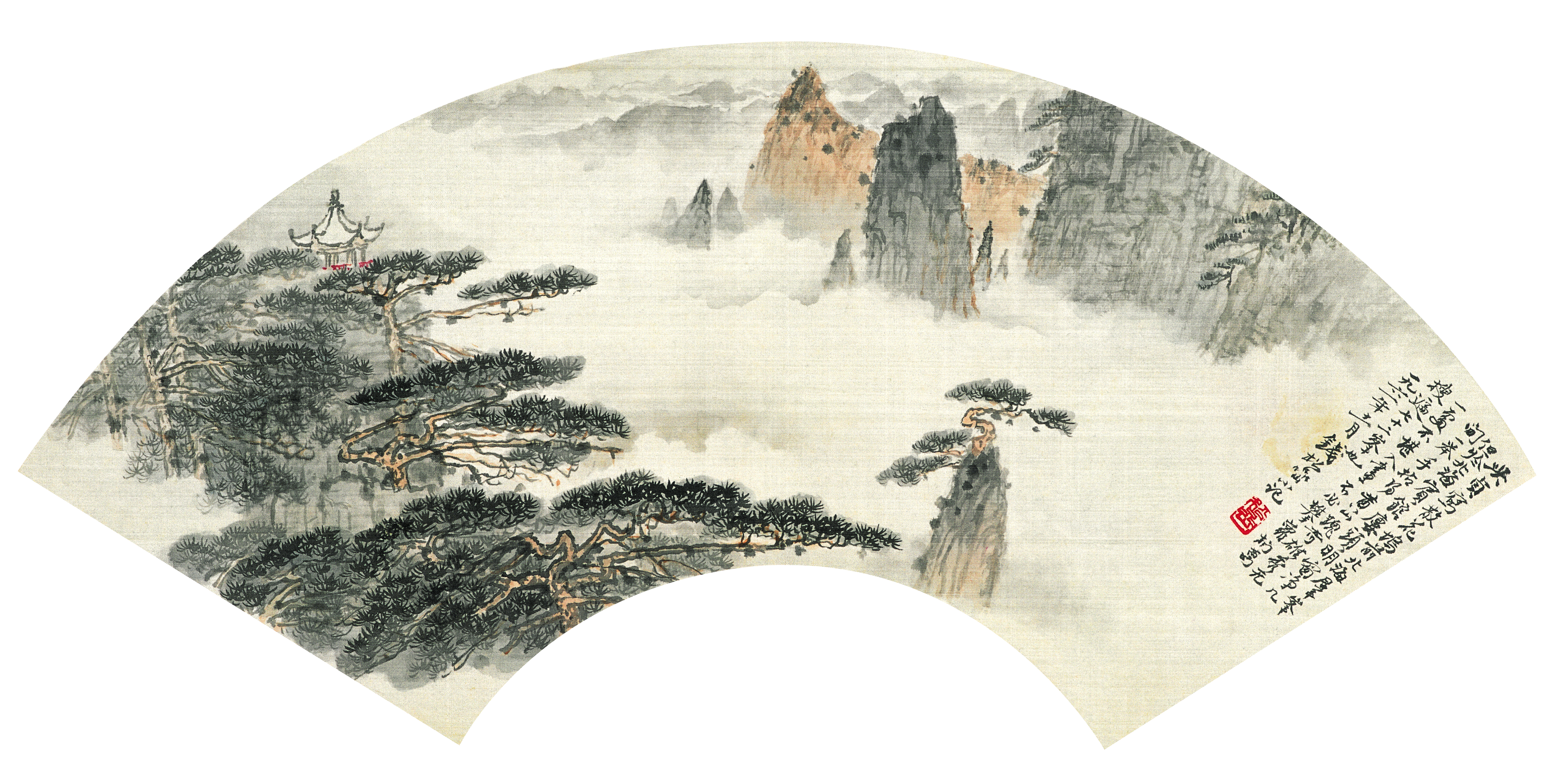
Qian Songyan, painting on a fan (1961)

In 1946 several artists founded the Society of Fine Arts, of which he became chairman. In the following years he was involved in several political organizations and joined the Chinese Communist Party in 1954. He showed two of his pictures at the 1st exhibition of Chinese paintings in Nanjing in 1956 which attracted the attention of all the art circles within the Jiangsu Province.

In 1957, he got a job with the preparatory committee of the Jiangsu Academy of Chinese Painting. From then on, he split his time between Nanjing and Wuxi. His advanced landscape painting was recognized through his participation in an exhibition in Moscow. In 1959 he took a long trip on the Silk Road to Datong. More than 40 landscapes and over 100 sketches and drawings were created during this trip.

In November 1959, he traveled to the coastal city of Lianyungang together with a group of Chinese painters: Yu Tongfu, Song Wenzhi, Wei Zixi, and Zhang WenJjun. There he created the large-format work entitled "Voyage of Thousands Sailing Boats" for the JiangSu Salon in the Great Hall of the People in Beijing.

The Jiangsu Chinese Painters Academy was officially established in March 1960, and Qian Songyan was appointed as director. At the same time, he became vice-president of the Chinese Arts Society in Nanjing, at which point he lived in Nanjing. At that time, the Shanghai Art Publishing House published the illustrated book, The Pictures of Qian Songyan. Another illustrated book “Selected Works by Qian Songyan” followed in August by the art publishing house in Wuxi. Together with other famous painters, he traveled a total of 12,500 km across the country. This group included important painters such as Fu Baoshi, Yaming, Song Wenzhi and Wei Zixi. That year he painted a very large piece for the Museum of Chinese History. The title was Zhenghe Sails West.

In August 1962, he wrote an article about his ideas for the further development of Chinese painting. The Shanghai Art History Publishing House published his article, which described how landscape painting reflects the spirit.

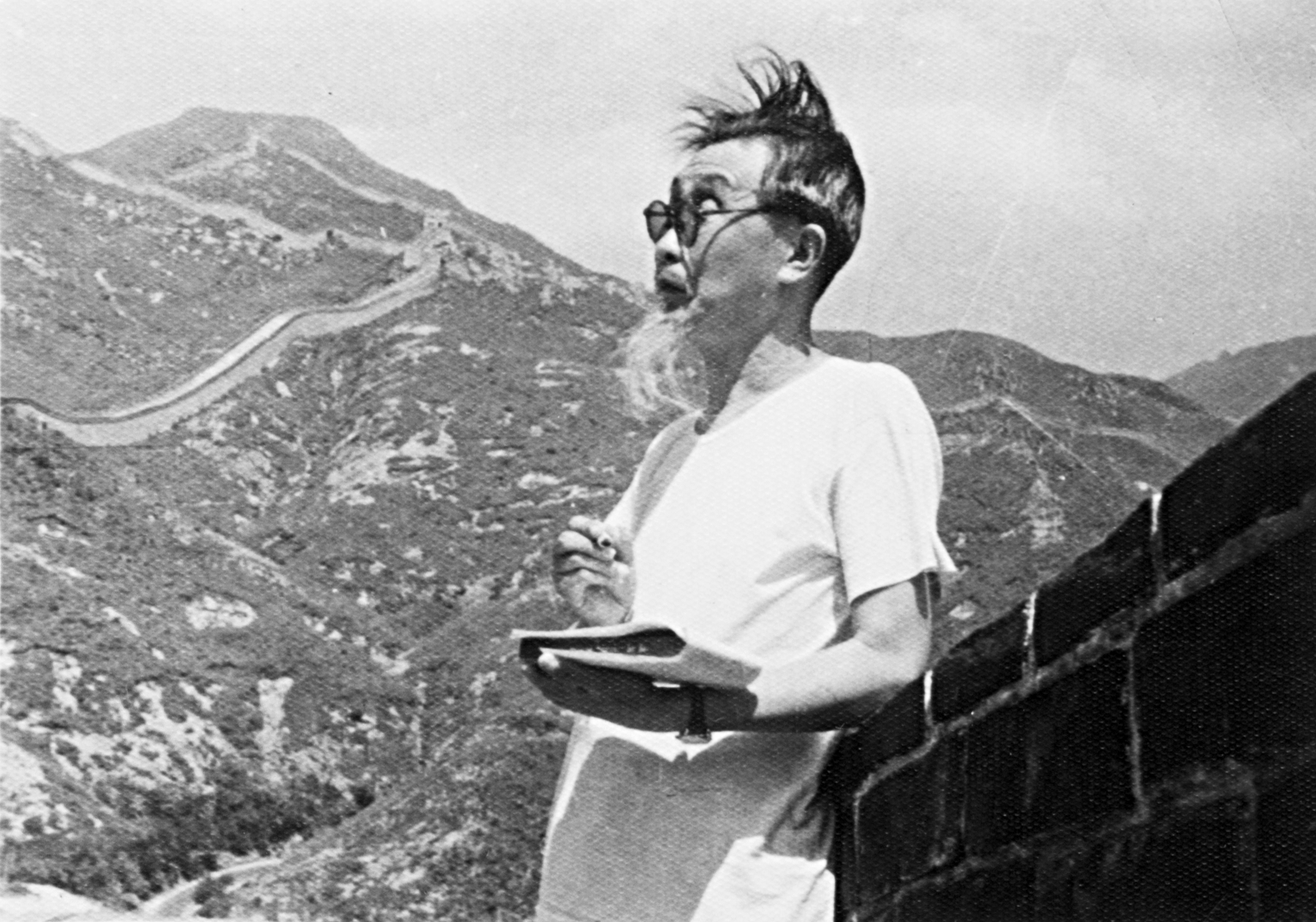
On the great wall, Qian Songyan 1964

After numerous revisions, he completed the painting Red Rock in October 1962, causing a sensation in the art world. He subsequently painted a few more iterations of the work. This masterwork is still used today as a model example in the curriculum of China Academy of Art. That year he moved to Nanjing.

In 1964, at the age of 65, the Chinese Artists Society, in cooperation with the Ministry of Culture and Art, held an exhibition of his works in the State Art Gallery in Beijing. The exhibition lasted 14 days and was a complete success. The exhibition then went to Tianjin, Lanzhou, Shanghai and Hong Kong. From July to August he went to Beijing again and painted a picture with Fu Baoshi for the Beijing Salon in the Great Hall of the People in Beijing.

In 1965 another illustrated book was published by the Shanghai Art Publishing House. For six months, starting in August 1965, he traveled with his wife to various places in Shanxi and Jiangxi provinces as well as Beijing to make sketches.

=== The Cultural Revolution ===
When the Cultural Revolution broke out in June 1966, he was forced to stop painting. After his re-education and return to Nanjing he was allowed to paint again in 1971. Even during these hardships he never gave up his artistic endeavor.

=== Qian Songyan and modern China ===
After his return to Nanjing he joined the ranks of the Jiangsu Fine Arts and Culture Bureau. He sketched the newly built Nanjing-Yangtze Bridge and the Jiangnan Coal Mines.

In July, he was invited by the Ministry of Foreign Affairs to paint a mural titled The Great Wall of China, for the Chinese Great Hall of the People Building. In August he wrote the article “New Ways to Create New National Images from the Old” and published it on September 3, 1972, in the Guangming Daily. In 1973 he took part in the Chinese Painting Exhibition in Jiangsu.

At the time of the 1974 Spring Festival, he painted an equally large painting in Wuxi for the arts and crafts salon of the Guangzhou Fair entitled Eternal Spring in the Splendor of the Country. He took part in the National Exhibition of Chinese Painting with the painting “Evergreen Pine On Mount Taishan”. However, the painting was denounced as “black Painting” according to the political campaign and the painting was removed from the exhibition.

In 1975 he attended the 4th National People’s Congress in Beijing. During this time, he named his house on Zhongyang Lu as “Wan Shi Lou” (Unyielding stone chamber). In April he visited an engineering project that was central to irrigation in Yangzhou basin and painted Slender West Lake (shou Xi HU), a beautiful lake near Yangzhou. In November he went back to his hometown Yixing, where he visited and painted many familiar places.

=== The time of his seminal paintings ===
Many of his large-scale paintings and murals were created during this time. In 1976 he painted a huge mural of The Great Wall for the Chinese Embassy in the Czech Republic. His painting of that time is characterized by red color, sometimes as a hint, occasionally taking over the painting, following Mao Zedong’s directive to Chinese artists to paint more with red color, reflecting a more revolutionary style.

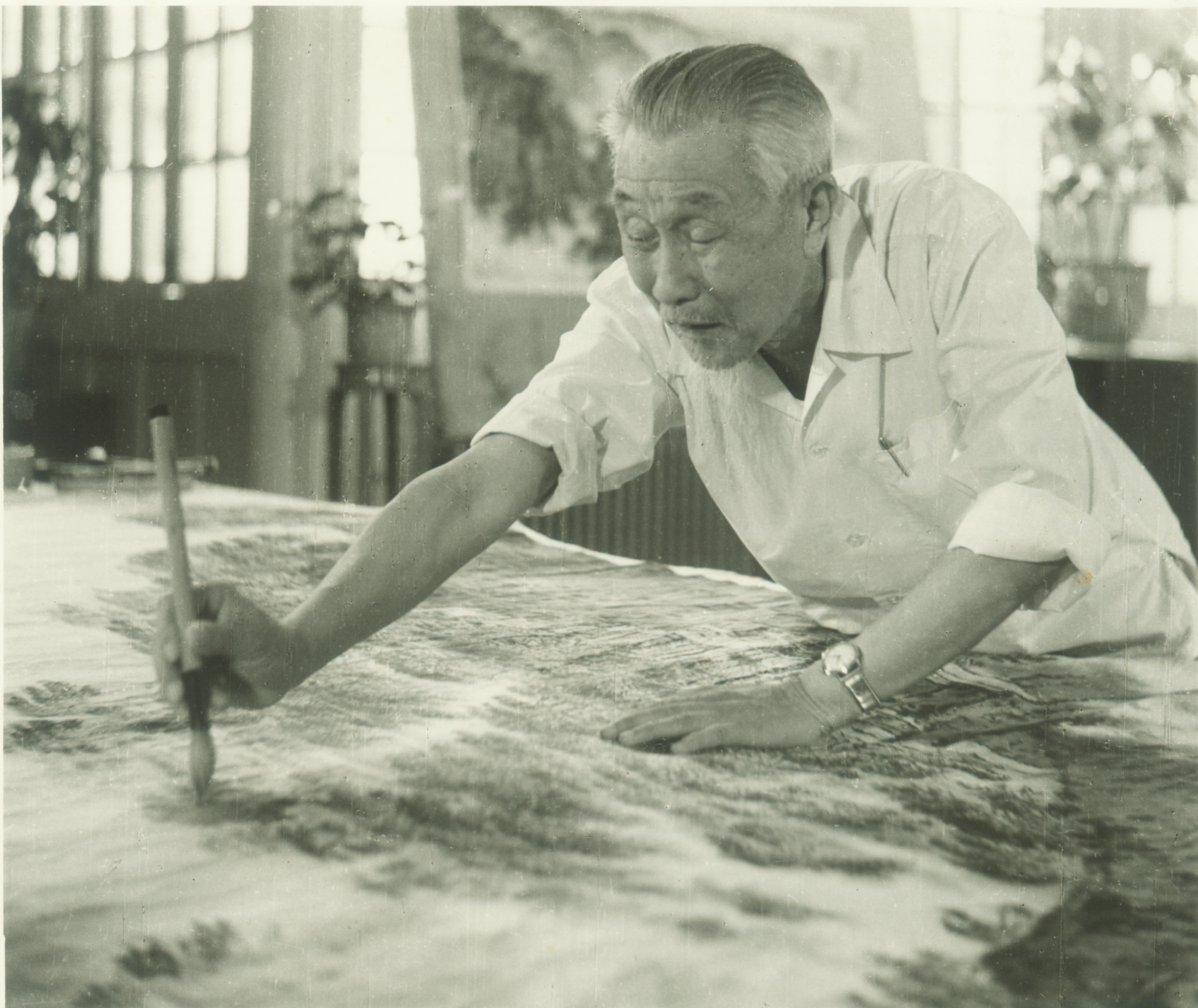
1977 - Qian Songyan paints at the Beijing Hotel

In 1977, the Jiangsu Academy of Chinese Painting opened again and he was appointed the president. While there he created the colossal painting of the Dawn in the Jujube Garden for the Memorial Hall for Chairman Mao.

In July he painted another colossal painting The Jinggangshan Waterfall for the Beijing Hotel and the Jiaxing, South Pacific for the Beijing Airport. In June 1978 he suffered heatstroke. After his recovery, he developed an innovative style of painting with his fingers.

In 1979, the State Gallery of Jiangsu organized an exhibition for his 80 years and presented 80 of his works from different periods. In June he attended the 5th National People’s Congress in Beijing and was invited by the Ministry of Culture to paint a painting for the Summer Palace. In October he attended the 4th Congress of the Chinese Literature and Art Association. Another illustrated book by him was published that year. On October 15, 1979, his painting The Infinite Beauty of the Great Wall was given to French President Valéry Giscard d’Estaing as a state gift.

In April 1980, he participated in the Chinese Society for Literature and Art Congress. He was elected honorary president, for a brief tenure, at the congress of the Jiangsu Chinese Artists Association.

In August, another illustrated book was published by him with 101 works with a foreword by Lai Shaoqi. In October, he wrote the foreword to the recently published book Occasional Exchanges in the Field - Dialogues with Comrade Qian Songyan by Zhao Pei, with whom he had spent time at the political rehabilitation facility.

At the age of 82, he participated in the Jiangsu Art Exhibition in 1981. From April to September 1982, he spent seven months working on the painting Spectacular Scenes from Lake Taihu, which he created for the Jiangsu Salon of the Great People’s Hall in Beijing. He returned to Nanjing in September and applied for re-admission to the Chinese Communist Party. He was admitted as a member in January 1983, and was recognized as a full member in February 1984.

=== Film documentation by the Shanghai Film Studio ===
From July to November 1983 he stayed with his eldest daughter in Beijing. During that time, Shanghai Film Studio began making a documentary in color about his art, titled “Great Landscaping Under His Brush.”

=== Late works ===
In August the volume “Finger Artist” was published, which consisted of pictures he drew with his fingers. He returned to Nanjing in November and painted Pine Trees in Xiangshan. In April, while he was dealing with serious health problems, 100 of his works were shown in an exhibition titled "The Latest Works of Qian Songyan" at Jiangsu Art Gallery.

In June he received an envoy from the Wuxi government. He planned to donate 100 of his paintings to the city, as well as his private residence. It was decided to convert his house into a memorial building.

Despite his illness and fragile health, he worked to add to his manuscripts and poetic notes. Another illustrated book was published in early 1985 and exhibitions in Fujian and Hangzhou followed. In April, a representative from Yixing City came to receive his donation of pictures.

His youngest daughter, Xinmei, organized an exhibition for him at Shandong State Gallery in Jinan in May 1985. In mid-May, the film team from the Shanghai film studio made additional recordings for their documentary. When his health would allow him, he accompanied the team to many sites including Linggu Temple, MingXiaoling Mausoleum, and Mochou Lake.

In late May 1985 his health deteriorated rapidly and he died on September 4, 1985, seven days before his 87th birthday. On September 11, the memorial service was held in the Jiangsu Party Committee Hall in Nanjing. Over 500 mourners came, including representatives from all over China. Together with his portrait, his ashes were placed in a shrine, flanked by a melancholy poem:

In the years that followed, his works were met with increasing international interest and have been traded by auction houses such as B. Sotheby’s and Christie’s.

In celebration of his 120 anniversary, the Museum of Qian Songyan was inaugurated in 2019 in his hometown Yixing.

== Works (selection from a list in the illustrated book Qian Songyan by Qian Xinmei) ==
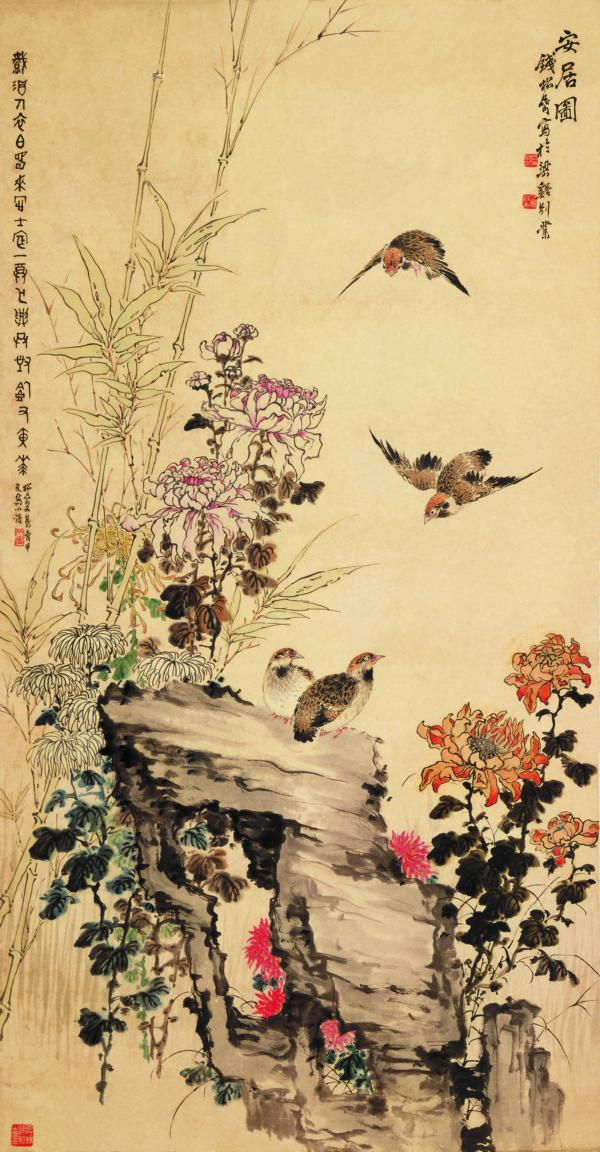
Harmony, Qian Songyan oracle script

- 1926: 10,000 bamboo after the rain
- 1928: Nanguo School
- 1936: Yu Mountain scenery
- 1939: The only Road to Hua Mountain
- 1943: Studies in the summer under the pine trees
- 1940s (exact date unknown): Harmonie (oracle bones script)
- 1946: Healthy Long Life
- 1957: Moscow - Beijing on the occasion of the 40th anniversary of the October Revolution in Russia
- 1959: Coal transport
- Illness and late life 1961: Huang Mountain above the Fog (Beihai / North Sea), fan picture
- 1961: Red rocks
- 1961: Great rivers and mountains
- 1960s (exact date unknown): Meiyuan
- 1970: Yanan
- 1970s (exact date unknown): Zhong Nan Hai, finger painting
- 1978: Waterfall
- 1970th (mid 70th, exact date unknown): The Infinite Beauty of the Great Wall
- 1981: Xiaoxiang House (Cao Xueqin’s home)
- 1981: At the shore of Taihu
- 1982: Memory of Home
- 1984: Spring on the Mochou Lake
- 1985: Eternal Harmony on the occasion of the International Youth Day in Nanjing

== Literature (selection) ==
Bilingual Chinese / English

- Longing for Home -Paintings of Qian Songyan Morning Glory Press Beijing 1987, ISBN 7-5054-0069-X
- East Asian Paintings Chinese Masters "Qian Songyan Modern" 2006 North America Fine Arts Publishing House ISBN 0-9780667-5-8
- Qian Songyan Shanshui Ceye Jingpin Xuanji by Gu Wu Xuan Publishing House 1997, ISBN 7-80574-292-8 J.232
- "Twelve Nanjing Master Artists" - Selected Album 2004 Nanjing Verlag ISBN 7-80614-909-0 J.66

Chinese

- Qian Songyan illustrated book, written by Qian Xinmei, Jiangsu Art Publishing House Nanjing August 2005 1st edition ISBN 7-5344-1947-6 (钱 松岩 画集 / 钱 心 梅 编 江苏 美术 出版社 2005 年 8 月 第 1 版)
- Qian Songyan illustrated book, written by Qian Xinmei and Kong Xiangdong, Nanjing Phönix Verlag, December 2006 1st edition ISBN 7-80643-933-1 /J.74 (钱 松岩 画集 / 钱 心 梅, 孔祥东 编 南京 凤凰 出 版社 2006 年12 月 第 1 版)
