= Liaoning Provincial Museum =

History and art museum in Shenghe District, Liaoning, China

Coordinates: 41°48′03″N 123°25′49″E

- 辽宁省博物馆
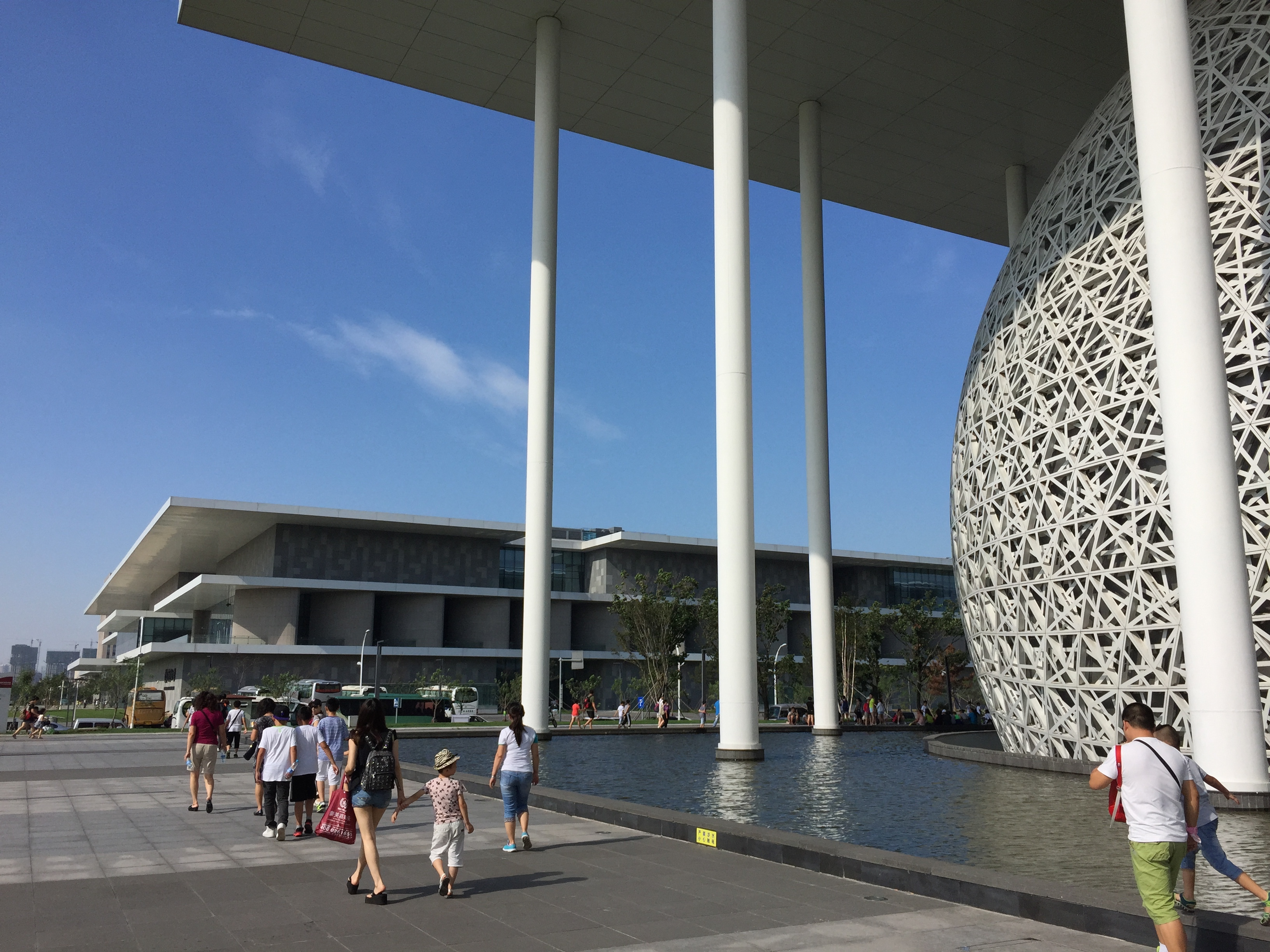
- Established: 1949
- Location: 363 Shifu Rd, Shenghe District, Shenyang 辽宁省沈阳市沈河区市府大路363号 (Main entrance on Huigong St)
- Type: History and Art museum
- Website: www.lnmuseum.com.cn

The Liaoning Provincial Museum (Chinese: trad. 遼寧省博物館, simp. 辽宁省博物馆; Liáoníngshěng Bówùguǎn) is a prominent museum of history and fine arts located in Shenyang, the capital of China's Liaoning province.

== History ==
The institution was founded as the Northeast Museum by the Northeast People's Government and opened on July 7, 1949. It was renamed the "Liaoning Provincial Museum" in 1959. In July 2003, it moved to a new, specially designed building on the east side of Government Square (市府广场) in Shenyang.

== Collections ==
The permanent collections include:

- the Dawn of Chinese Culture Gallery: archaeological exhibits related to the Hongshan and Xinle cultures
- the Northern Shang and Zhou Period Gallery: bronze tools and weapons
- the Bei Shan Tang Tablet Gallery: Chinese steles
- the Ancient Chinese Currency and Coins Gallery
- the Art Work Exhibition of the Ming and Qing Dynasties Gallery, including Prosperous Suzhou
- the Chinese Post-Unification Gallery: tomb relics

== Visit ==
The museum is open from 9 am to 5 pm, except on Mondays. The museum is closed to the public on Mondays and during the public holiday for Chinese New Year. Entry is free.
