= Gu Kaizhi =

Chinese painter and politician (c. 344–406)

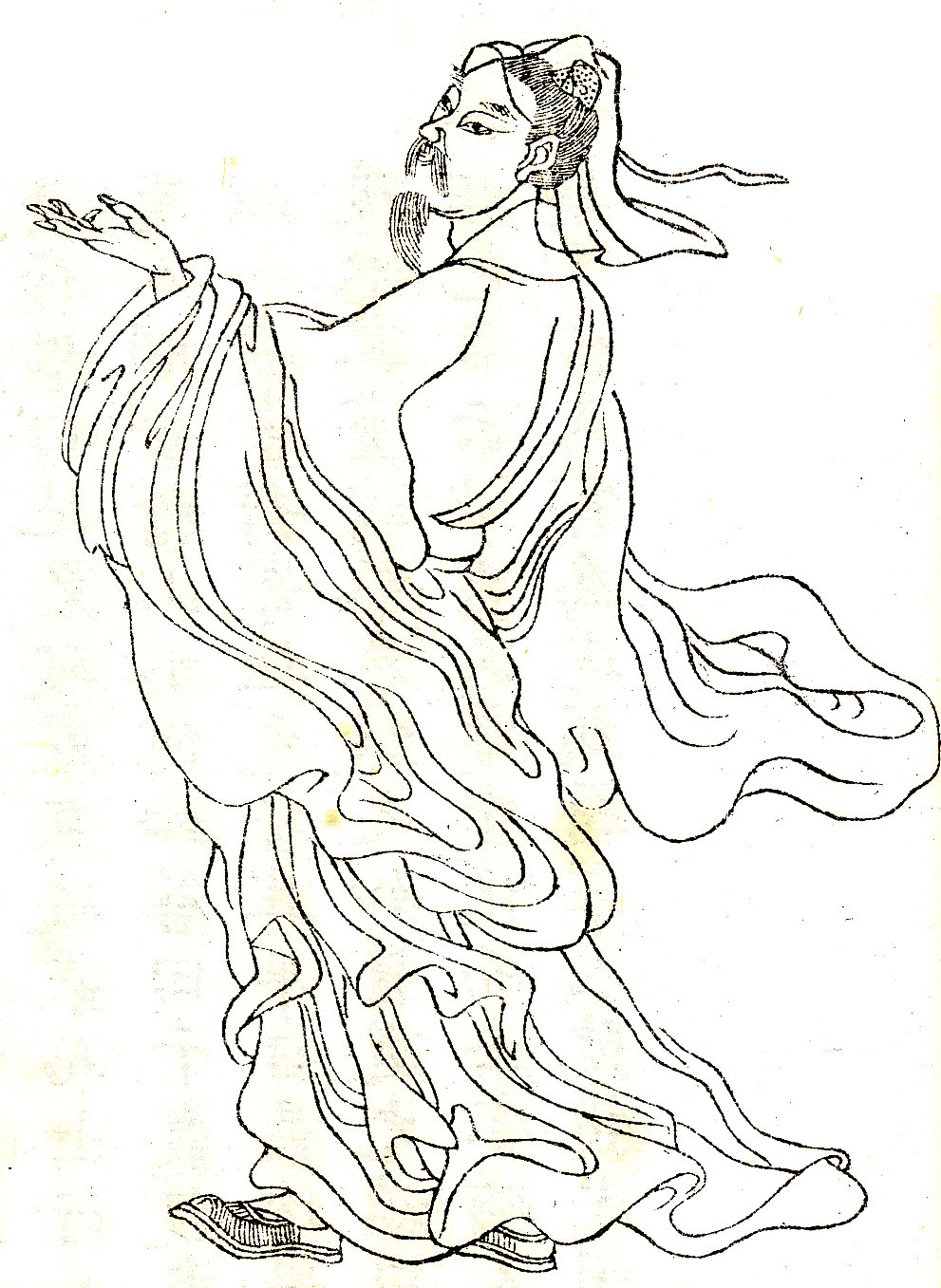
Gu Kaizhi

Gu Kaizhi (simplified Chinese: 顾恺之; traditional Chinese: 顧愷之; pinyin: Gù Kǎizhī; Wade–Giles: Ku K'ai-chih; c. 344–406), courtesy name Changkang (長康), was a Chinese painter and politician during the Eastern Jin dynasty (317–420). He was a celebrated painter of ancient China. He was born in Wuxi and first painted at Nanjing in 364. In 366, he became an officer (Da Sima Canjun or Assistant to the Minister of Defense, 大司馬參軍). Later he was promoted to royal officer (Sanji Changshi or Gentleman in Waiting to the Emperor, 散騎常侍). He was also a talented poet and calligrapher. He wrote three books about painting theory: On Painting (畫論), Introduction of Famous Paintings of Wei and Jin Dynasties (魏晉勝流畫贊) and Painting Yuntai Mountain (畫雲台山記). He wrote: "In figure paintings the clothes and the appearances were not very important. The eyes were the spirit and the decisive factor."

Gu's art is known today through copies of several silk handscroll paintings attributed to him.

== Biography ==
Gu Kaizhi was born in Wuxi (in modern Jiangsu) where his father Gu Yuezhi served in the imperial secretariat as an assistant. (Note: Gu Yuezhi has a short biography in vol.77 of Jin Shu, just after the biography of his superior Yin Hao; Gu Kaizhi has a biography in vol.92 of the same work.) At about nineteen he was employed as aide to the Grand Marshal Huan Wen. He held a succession of minor official posts under various leaders of the Eastern Jin court.

One emperor under whom Gu Kaizhi served was Huan Xuan (son of Huan Wen). An enthusiastic art collector, ahead of his accession Huan Xuan ordered a big boat to store paintings and other treasures so that they could be easily transported to safety in case of war. Gu Kaizhi entrusted to the emperor a sealed chest with his most precious works. The emperor broke open the box, stole the paintings, then repaired and returned it to the artist with the seals intact. Upon discovering his loss, Gu Kaizhi said that "the marvelous works partook of divine power, transformed themselves and vanished, like men ascending to join the immortals."

== Works ==
=== The Admonitions of the Instructress to the Court Ladies (女史箴圖) ===
This painting, dated between the 6th and 8th century AD—probably an early Tang dynasty copy—illustrates nine stories from a political satire about Empress Jia Nanfeng written by Zhang Hua (c.232 – May 300). Beginning in the eighth century, many collectors and emperors left seals, poems, and comments on the scroll. The Admonitions scroll was stored in the emperor's treasure until it was looted by the British army in the Boxer Uprising in 1900. Now it is in the British Museum collection, missing the first three scenes. There is another surviving copy of this painting, made during the Song dynasty and is now held in the Palace Museum in Beijing. The Song version is complete in twelve scenes.

The painting is on silk and is a polychrome. "The figures, whose countenances are at once solemn and tranquil, are described with a thin, unmodulated brush-line.... The brush-mode...has been described as 'spring silkworms spitting silk'".

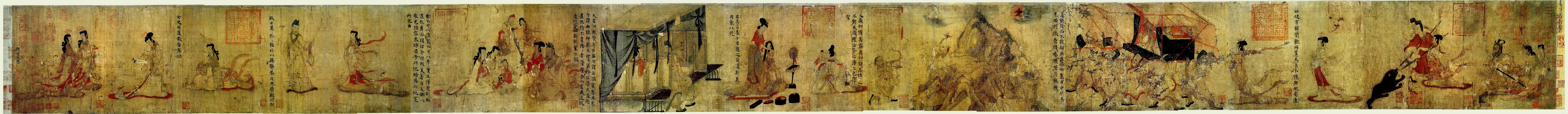
The British Museum copy of The Admonitions of the Instructress to the Court Ladies
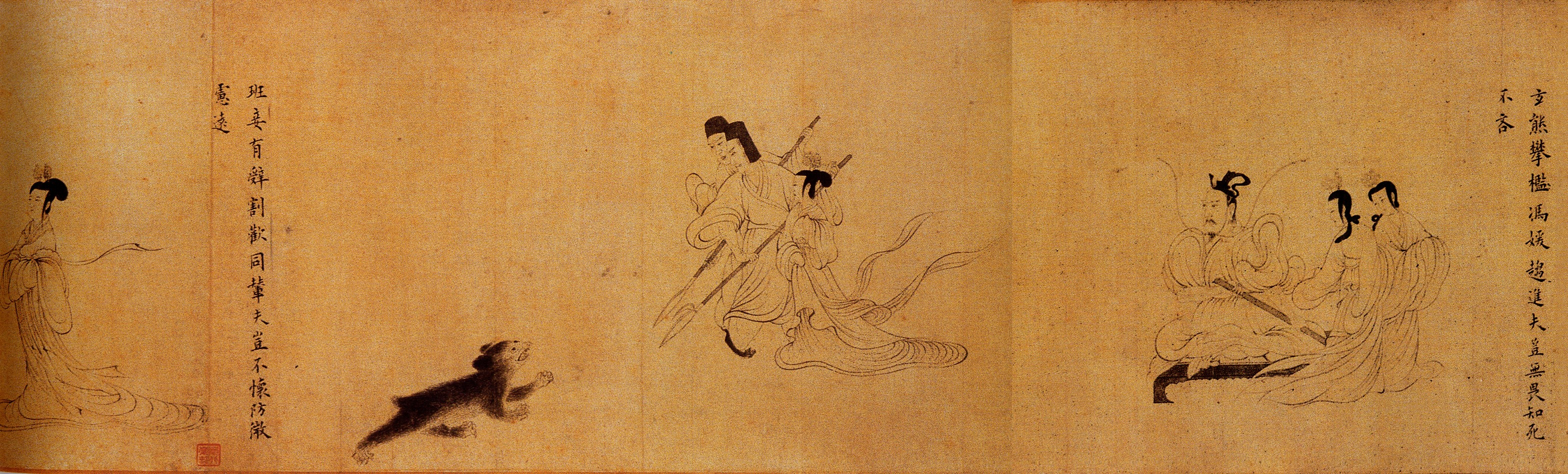
A section of the Palace Museum copy of The Admonitions of the Instructress to the Court Ladies

=== Nymph of the Luo River (洛神賦圖) ===
Nymph of the Luo River is a painting by Gu which illustrates a poem written by Cao Zhi (192–232). It survives in five copies dating to the Song and Ming dynasties. One copy is now held in the Palace Museum in Beijing, one copy in the National Palace Museum in Taipei and another one is now at the Freer Gallery in Washington, D.C. The third was brought to Manchuria by the last emperor Puyi (1906–1967) while he was the puppet emperor of Manchukuo under Japanese rule. When the Japanese surrendered in 1945 the painting disappeared. After ten years the Liaoning Province Museum recovered it. The fifth copy was bought by the British Museum in 1930 and is generally dated to the Ming Dynasty.

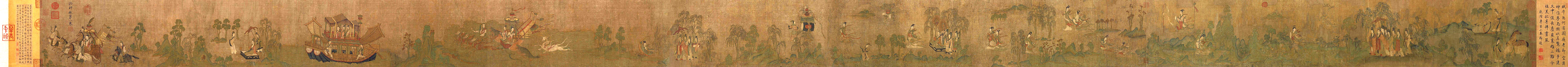
The Palace Museum copy of the Nymph of the Luo River, Southern Song.
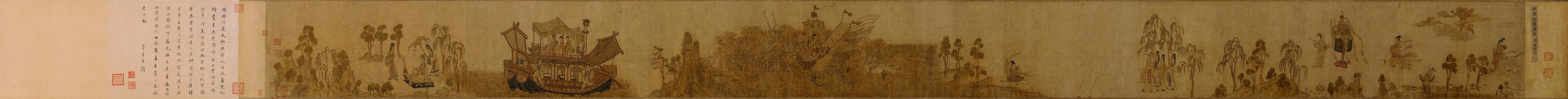
The Freer Gallery of Art copy of the Nymph of the Luo River, Southern Song.
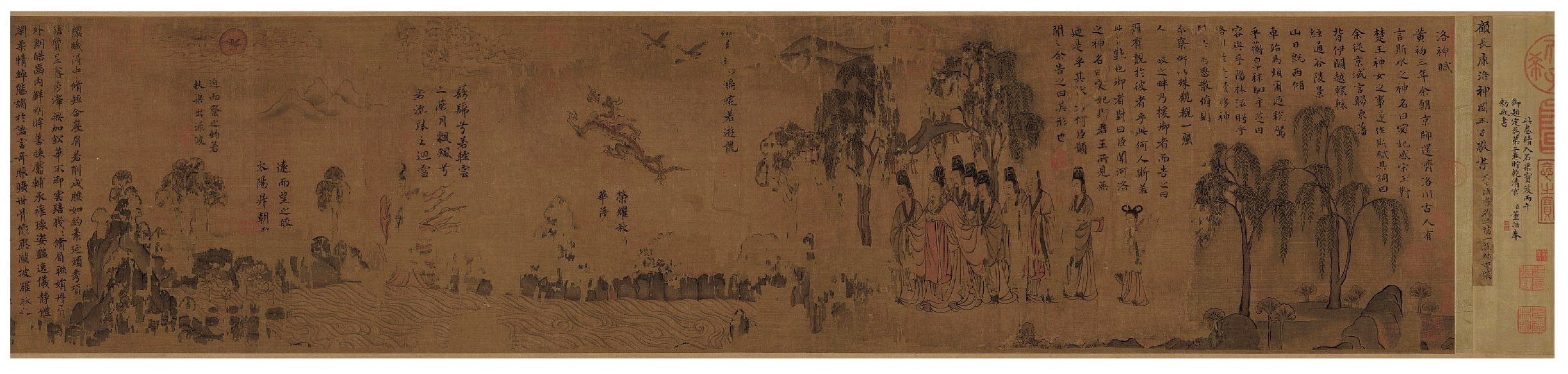
A section of the Liaoning Provincial Museum copy of the Nymph of the Luo River, Southern Song.
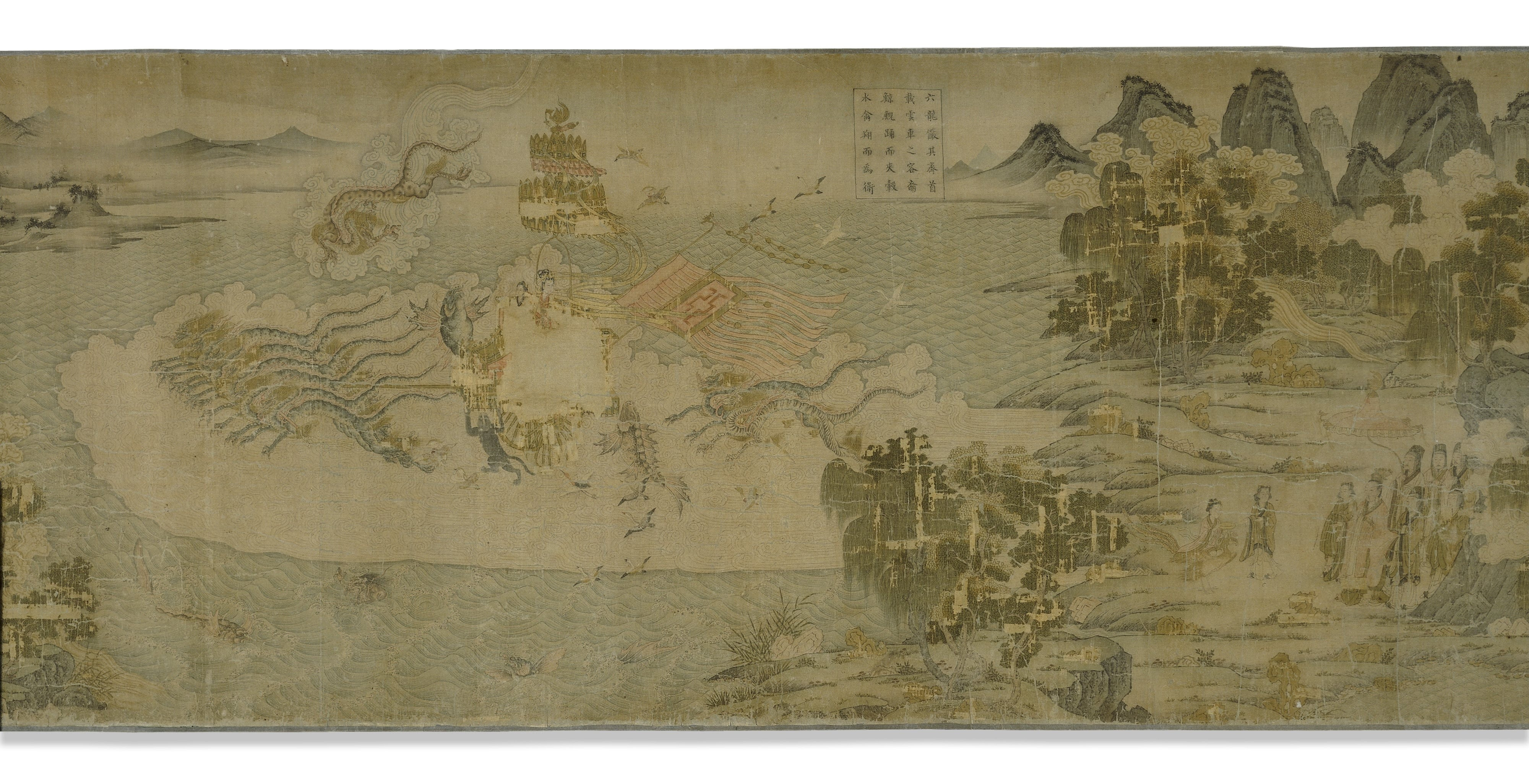
British Museum copy of the Nymph of the Luo River, Ming.
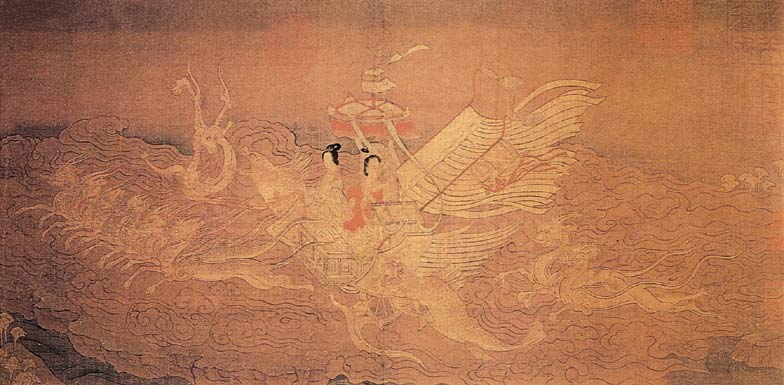
Taipei copy of the Nymph of the Luo River.

=== Wise and Benevolent Women (列女仁智圖) ===
Wise and Benevolent Women survives in a 13th-century copy dating to the Song dynasty, and is today located in the Palace Museum in Beijing. It illustrates a subset of the women described in the Han dynasty work Biographies of Exemplary Women. The 5-meter-long scroll is divided into 10 sections, with each section containing a short description.

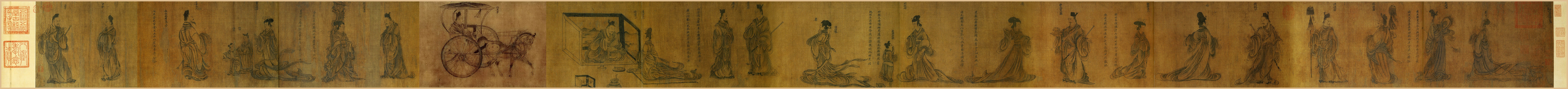
The 13th century Palace Museum copy of the Wise and Benevolent Women, full painting.
