= The Advisors Alliance =

2017 Chinese television series

- Promotional poster

Chinese name
- Traditional Chinese: 大軍師司馬懿之軍師聯盟 / 大軍師司馬懿之虎嘯龍吟
- Simplified Chinese: 大军师司马懿之军师联盟 / 大军师司马懿之虎啸龙吟
- Literal meaning: The Great Military Strategist Sima Yi: The Military Strategists' Alliance / The Great Military Strategist Sima Yi: Growling Tiger and Roaring Dragon
Transcriptions
Standard Mandarin
- Hanyu Pinyin: dà jūnshī Sīmǎ Yì zhī jūnshī liánméng / dà jūnshī Sīmǎ Yì zhī hǔxiào lóngyín
- Genre: Historical drama
- Written by: Chang Jiang
- Directed by: Zhang Yongxin
- Presented by: Zhuang Baobin; Xiao Wenge; Jin Hongxing; Xu Jiaxuan; Zhang Jian; Wu Bing; Cao Huayi; Mu Xiaoguang
- Starring: Wu Xiubo; Liu Tao; Li Chen; Yu Hewei; Janine Chang; Tang Yixin; Zhai Tianlin; Liu Huan; Wang Jinsong; Wang Dong
- Composers: Cao Dongdong; Jin Qilin
- Country of origin: China
- Original language: Mandarin
- No. of episodes: 42 (Part 1); 44 (Part 2)

Production
- Executive producers: Wu Xiubo; Xiao Yan; Wang Yang; Gu Wenjuan
- Producers: Zhang Alin; Zhang Jian; Xu Jiaxuan
- Cinematography: Zhang Wenjie
- Editor: Liao Wei
- Running time: 45 minutes per episode
- Production companies: Dongyang Meng Jiang Wei Film and TV Culture; Jiangsu Huali Culture Media; DOMYS Entertainment
- Budget: ¥400 million

Original release
- Release: 22 June – 14 July 2017

The Advisors Alliance is a 2017 Chinese two-part television series based on the life of Sima Yi, a government official and military general who lived in the late Eastern Han dynasty and Three Kingdoms period of China. The series starred Wu Xiubo as the main character, with Liu Tao, Li Chen, Janine Chang, Tang Yixin, Yu Hewei and Wang Luoyong playing supporting roles. The first part of the series started airing on Jiangsu TV and Anhui TV on 22 June 2017. The second part started airing on Youku on 8 December 2017.

== Synopsis ==
The series follows the life of Sima Yi through the late Eastern Han dynasty and Three Kingdoms period of China.

The first part covers Sima Yi's early career under Cao Cao, the warlord who controls the central government and the figurehead Emperor Xian towards the end of the Eastern Han dynasty. Sima Yi becomes an adviser to Cao Cao's son Cao Pi and assists him in defeating his younger brother Cao Zhi in a power struggle over the succession to their father's place. Following Cao Cao's death, Cao Pi usurps the throne from Emperor Xian, ends the Eastern Han dynasty, and declares himself emperor of the newly established Cao Wei state. This part ends around the middle or towards the end of Cao Pi's reign.

The second part covers Sima Yi's career in the Cao Wei state during the Three Kingdoms period and his service under the emperors Cao Pi, Cao Rui and Cao Fang. He leads Cao Wei forces into battles against its rival states, Shu Han and Eastern Wu, and rises through the ranks to become one of the most powerful figures in Cao Wei and ultimately a regent for the third Cao Wei emperor, Cao Fang. In his final years, Sima Yi successfully stages a coup d'état against his co-regent Cao Shuang and effectively becomes the de facto ruler of the Cao Wei state. About 15 years after Sima Yi's death, his grandson Sima Yan would eventually usurp the Cao Wei throne and replace it with the Jin dynasty (266–420).

== Cast ==
=== Part 1 ===
- Wu Xiubo as Sima Yi
- Liu Tao as Zhang Chunhua
- Li Chen as Cao Pi
- Yu Hewei as Cao Cao
- Tang Yixin as Guo Zhao (based on Guo Nüwang)
- Janine Chang as Bai Lingyun (based on Lady Bai)
- Zhai Tianlin as Yang Xiu
- Zhang Zhixi as Zhen Fu
- Wang Dong as Sima Fu
- Xiao Shunyao as Sima Shi
  - Lin Jingzhe as Sima Shi (child)
  - Rong Zishan as Sima Shi (young)
- Tan Jianci as Sima Zhao
  - Mei Zihan as Sima Zhao (young)
- Zhang He as Cao Zhen
- Wang Jinsong as Xun Yu
- Lai Xi as Hou Ji
- Chu Quanzhong as Chen Qun
- Cao Lei as Guo Jia
- Lu Siyu as Ji Bu
- Wang Renjun as Cao Zhi
- Liu Lingzhi as Deng Ai
- Liu Yue as Zhong Hui
- Xu Huanshan as Hua Tuo
- Huang Junpeng as Xu Shu
- Ding Haifeng as Sun Quan
- Zhang Zhizhong as Sima Fang
- Li Youwei as Sima Lang
- Zhang Doudou as Xiahou Hui
- Xu Min as Zhong Yao
- Lu Xingyu as Lu Xun
- Chen Zhihui as Cao Hong
- Luan Junwei as Ding Yi
- Lu Ling as Lady Bian
- Yang Meng as Xun You
- Liu Jian as Yang Biao
- Wang Li as Man Chong
- Yin Guohua as Shi Chun
- Wang Xiuqiang as Jia Kui
- Wang Zeqing as Cui Yan
- Lu Yanqi as Xiaoyuan
- Liu Yulin as Cheng Yu
- Du Xingqi as Cao Xiu
- Zhang Xingzhe as Xiahou Shang
- Yang Hanbin as Xiahou Dun
- Cheng Cheng as Xiahou Xuan
- Li Shengye as Xiahou Mao
- Li Long as Xu Chu
- Guo Mingyu as Cao Zhang
- Li Yuyang as Princess Qinghe
- Hou Tongjiang as Uncle Fang
- Wang Zengqi as Wu Zhi
- Ren Yu as Liu Zhen
- Wang Maolei as Liu Xie (Emperor Xian)
- Tan Shasha as Consort Dong
- Yu Shuxin as Elder Princess
- Wu Yuyu as Younger Princess
- Wang Bozhao as Liu Bei
- Guo Jianuo as Zhang He
- Zhao Xin as Ziye
- Wang Hucheng as Zhang Zhao
- Zhao Yanmin as Dong Cheng
- Li Zhenze as Xiaozhou
- Tianbao as Cao Chong
- Li Xiaolong as Tian Liu
- Dalai Halihu as Cao Biao
- Liu Guhao as Cui Shen
- Chang Jin as Cao Ren
- Zhang Jun as Zhang Yin
- Lü Xinshun as Zhan Qian
- Li Haiying as Zhou Tai
- Shen Xuewei as Guan Jun
- Zhang Yongmin as Fa Jian
- Wei Yu as Xu Huang
- Liu Xu as Zhang Liao
- Cui Huaijie as Li Zheng
- Yao Xinyan as Sima Lang's daughter
- Huang Yi as Cao Rui (young)
- Zhao Yunzhuo as Princess Dongxiang

=== Part 2 ===
- Wu Xiubo as Sima Yi
- Wang Luoyong as Zhuge Liang
- Liu Huan as Cao Rui
- Li Chen as Cao Pi
- Liu Tao as Zhang Chunhua
- Janine Chang as Bai Lingyun
- Tang Yixin as Guo Zhao (based on Guo Nüwang)
- Xiao Shunyao as Sima Shi
- Tan Jianci as Sima Zhao
- Du Yiheng as Cao Shuang
- Wang Dong as Sima Fu
- Lu Siyu as Ji Bu
- Xiao Rongsheng as Zhao Yun
- Pu Tao as Wang Yuanji
- Zhang He as Cao Zhen
- Lai Xi as Hou Ji
- Chu Quanzhong as Chen Qun
- Liu Lingzhi as Deng Ai
- Liu Yue as Zhong Hui
- Zhang Doudou as Xiahou Hui
- Yin Guohua as Shi Chun
- Du Xingqi as Cao Xiu
- Lu Yanqi as Xiaoyuan
- Zhang Xingzhe as Xiahou Shang
- Cheng Cheng as Xiahou Xuan
- Li Shengye as Xiahou Mao
- Guo Jianuo as Zhang He
- Chen Zhelun as Cao Fang
  - Sheng Zihang as Cao Fang (young)
- Han Dong as Wei Yan
- Yan Wenxuan as He Yan
- Zhao Huanyu as Ding Mi
- Yan Jie as Sun Li
- He Xiang as Guo Huai
- Guo Ye as Wang Shuang
- Cao Jiqiang as Meng Da
- Lu Yong as Sun Zi
- Liu Guoji as Liu Fang
- Wang Zi as Zhang Hu
- Zhu Yonglin as Han Lin
- Jiang Han as Liu Shan
- Bai Haitao as Jiang Wei
- Song Tao as Gao Xiang
- Xiao Bing as Huang Hao
- Liu Guangnan as Ma Su
- Xu Zhanwei as Ma Dai
- Hao Rongguang as Wang Ping
- Kang Fei as Guan Xing
- Gong Fangmin as Jiang Wan
- Wang Tieling as Wu Ban
- Chen Lixin as Yang Yi
- Li Yuhao as Deng Xian
- Hui Junping as Zhu Ran
- Zhang Yong as Zhou Fang
- Zhang Tianyang as Bixie
- Hu Li as Yue Lin
- Zheng Xintong as Lady Liu
- Chen Zhihui as Cao Hong
- Shi Guang as Cao Yu
- Fu Zhengyang as Cao Zhao
- Liu Qi as Sima Lun
- He Meiqi as Sima Rou
- Kuang Can as Chen Dao
- Wang Bozhao as Liu Bei
- Wang Li as Man Chong
- Xu Min as Zhong Yao
- Lu Xingyu as Lu Xun
- Wang Xiuqiang as Jia Kui
- Xu Yuanyuan as Qingxiao
- Wen Jing as Empress Dowager Guo
- Deng Yange as Jianjia
- Wang Zengqi as Wu Zhi

== Production ==
The series took five years and cost a total of 400 million yuan in production, with most of the money going into the sets. More than 6,000 costumes were made for the series. Wu Xiubo, the lead actor, serves as the executive producer of the series. Filming lasted for 333 days, beginning on 13 February 2016 and ending on 10 January 2017.

== Soundtrack ==
The Advisors Alliance - Original Television Soundtrack (大军师司马懿之军师联盟电视剧原声音乐大碟)
| No. | Title | Music | Length |
|---|---|---|---|
| 1. | "Duan Ge Xing (短歌行)" | Yu Hewei |
| 2. | "Shi Wu Cong Jun Zheng (十五从军征)" | Jin Yubin |
| 3. | "Yuan Ge Xing (怨歌行)" | Yeung Tung & Lu Moyi |

== Reception ==
=== Critical response ===
The series received high praise for its plot, cinematography and cast performance. The first part of the series generated six billion hits on Youku and 8.2 points out of 10 on Douban. A mobile game adapted from the series was also released. However, some viewers have criticised the series on the grounds of historical inaccuracies, and said that the additional details and modern lines in the series serve as distractions and ruin the mood.

=== Ratings ===
China Jiangsu TV / Anhui TV premiere ratings (CSM52)
| Episodes | Broadcast date | Jiangsu TV | | | Anhui TV | | |
| Episodes | Broadcast date | Ratings (%) | Audience share (%) | Rankings | Ratings (%) | Audience share (%) | Rankings |
|---|---|---|---|---|---|---|---|
| 1-2 | June 22, 2017 | 0.678 | 2.334 | 3 | 0.277 | 0.955 | 14 |
| 3-4 | June 23, 2017 | 0.72 | 2.43 | 4 | 0.323 | 1.09 | 9 |
| 5-6 | June 24, 2017 | 0.670 | 2.27 | 4 | 0.342 | 1.16 | 11 |
| 7 | June 25, 2017 | 0.734 | 2.64 | 2 | 0.404 | 1.45 | 7 |
| 8-9 | June 26, 2017 | 0.732 | 2.591 | 3 | 0.462 | 1.636 | 7 |
| 10-11 | June 27, 2017 | 0.778 | 2.82 | 2 | 0.441 | 1.6 | 6 |
| 12-13 | June 28, 2017 | 0.853 | 3.078 | 2 | 0.456 | 1.644 | 7 |
| 14-15 | June 29, 2017 | 0.876 | 3.096 | 4 | 0.541 | 1.913 | 7 |
| 16-17 | June 30, 2017 | 0.912 | 3.08 | 1 | 0.533 | 1.8 | 7 |
| 18-19 | July 1, 2017 | 0.927 | 3.170 | 1 | 0.613 | 2.092 | |
| 20 | July 2, 2017 | 0.864 | 3.127 | 3 | 0.556 | 2.012 | 5 |
| 21-22 | July 3, 2017 | 0.972 | 3.444 | 1 | 0.542 | 1.919 | 5 |
| 23-24 | July 4, 2017 | 0.931 | 3.286 | 2 | 0.511 | 1.805 | 8 |
| 25-26 | July 5, 2017 | 0.964 | 3.321 | 3 | 0.548 | 1.889 | 5 |
| 27-28 | July 6, 2017 | 0.959 | 3.243 | 3 | 0.578 | 1.956 | 6 |
| 29-30 | July 7, 2017 | 0.907 | 3.172 | 3 | 0.598 | 2.1 | 8 |
| 31-32 | July 8, 2017 | 1.049 | 3.552 | 2 | 0.53 | 1.801 | 7 |
| 33 | July 9, 2017 | 0.985 | 3.577 | 2 | 0.842 | 3.062 | 5 |
| 34-35 | July 10, 2017 | 1.076 | 3.71 | 2 | 0.901 | 3.11 | 4 |
| 36-37 | July 11, 2017 | 1.143 | 3.97 | 2 | 0.896 | 3.12 | 5 |
| 38-39 | July 12, 2017 | 1.100 | 3.887 | 3 | 0.931 | 3.294 | 4 |
| 40-41 | July 13, 2017 | 1.029 | 3.566 | 4 | 0.91 | 3.154 | 5 |
| 42 | July 14, 2017 | 0.946 | 3.5 | 3 | 0.473 | 1.757 | 9 |
| Average | | | | —N/a | | | —N/a |

- Highest ratings are marked in red, lowest ratings are marked in blue

=== Awards and nominations ===
| Award | Category | Nominated work | Result | Ref. |
|---|---|---|---|---|
| 2nd Golden Guduo Media Awards | Best Network & Web Production | The Advisors Alliance | Won | |
| 2nd Golden Guduo Media Awards | Best Scriptwriter | Chang Jiang | Won | |
| 2nd Golden Guduo Media Awards | Best Actor (Web series) | Wu Xiubo | Won | |
| 8th Macau International Television Festival | Best Actor | Wu Xiubo | Nominated | |
| 8th Macau International Television Festival | Best Supporting Actor | Yu Hewei | Nominated | |
| 31st Flying Apsaras Awards | Outstanding Television Series (Historical) | The Advisors Alliance | Won | |
| 31st Flying Apsaras Awards | Outstanding Director | Zhang Yongxin | Nominated | |
| 31st Flying Apsaras Awards | Outstanding Screenwriter | Chang Jiang | Nominated | |
| 31st Flying Apsaras Awards | Outstanding Actor | Yu Hewei | Nominated | |
| 24th Shanghai Television Festival | Best Television Series | The Advisors Alliance | Nominated | |
| 24th Shanghai Television Festival | Best Director | Zhang Yongxin | Nominated | |
| 24th Shanghai Television Festival | Best Writer | Chang Jiang | Nominated | |
| 24th Shanghai Television Festival | Best Actor | Wu Xiubo | Nominated | |
| 24th Shanghai Television Festival | Best Supporting Actor | Yu Hewei | Won | |
| 24th Shanghai Television Festival | Best Cinematography | Zhang Wenjie | Nominated | |
| 24th Shanghai Television Festival | Best Art Design | Han Zhong | Won | |
| 29th China TV Golden Eagle Award | Best Actor | Yu Hewei | Nominated | |
| 29th China TV Golden Eagle Award | Best Actress | Liu Tao | Nominated | |
| 24th Huading Awards | Best Director | Zhang Yongxin | Nominated | |
| 24th Huading Awards | Best Screenwriter | Chang Jiang | Nominated | |
| 24th Huading Awards | Best Actress | Liu Tao | Nominated | |
| 24th Huading Awards | Best Supporting Actress | Janine Chang | Won | |
| 5th Hengdian Film and TV Festival of China | Best Director | Zhang Yongxin | Won | |
| 5th Hengdian Film and TV Festival of China | Best Actress | Liu Tao | Won | |
| 5th Hengdian Film and TV Festival of China | Best Supporting Actor | Zhai Tianlin | Won | |
