= Where the Legend Begins =

- Poster
- Chinese: 洛神
- Literal meaning: The Goddess of the Luo River
- Hanyu Pinyin: Luò Shén
- Jyutping: Lok3 San4
- Genre: Costume drama, romance
- Written by: Chan Ching-yee
- Starring: Ada Choi; Steven Ma; Moses Chan; Sonija Kwok
- Opening theme: Shui Chung Sin (水中仙) performed by Steven Ma
- Ending theme: Lau Sa (流沙) performed by Steven Ma and Rain Li
- Composer: Joseph Koo
- Country of origin: Hong Kong
- Original language: Cantonese
- No. of episodes: 27

Production
- Producer: Mui Siu-ching
- Production location: Hong Kong
- Camera setup: Multi camera
- Running time: 45 minutes (per episode)
- Production company: TVB

Original release
- Network: TVB Jade
- Release: 24 June – 26 July 2002

Where the Legend Begins is a 2002 Hong Kong television series produced by TVB. The series is based on the life story of Zhen Fu (Cantonese: Yan Fuk), a noble lady who lived during the Three Kingdoms period. It contains embellishments from folktales about Yan's romance with Cao Pi (Cantonese: Cho Pei) and Cao Zhi (Cantonese: Cho Chik). The series was first aired in Hong Kong on TVB Jade from 24 June to 26 July in 2002.

== Cast ==
Note: Some of the characters' names are in Cantonese romanisation.

Main cast

- Ada Choi as Yan Fuk
- Steven Ma as Cho Chik
- Moses Chan as Cho Pei
- Evergreen Mak as Cho Cheung
- Lau Dan as Cho Cho
- Sonija Kwok as Kwok Yun

Other cast

- Felix Lok as Sun Yuk
- Chuk Man-kwan as So Choi-yuk
- Irene Wong as Chui Fau
- Priscilla Ku as Lau Sik-sik
- Gilbert Lam as Yeung Sau
- Lam King-kong as Ting Yi
- June Chan as Yau-sin
- May Kwong as Song-yau
- Rainbow Ching Hor-wai as Lady Bin
- Michelle Fung as Lady Wong
- Wong Wai-leung as Yan Yim
- Alice Fung So-bor as Lady Cheung
- John Tang as Cho Jui
- Timothy Cheng as Sze-ma Yi
- Wah Chung-nam as Tsui Fong
- Lee Ka-ting as Ha-hau Yun
- Homer Cheung as Yu Kam
- Ngai Wai-man as Sze-ma Long
- Wong Wai-tak as Ka Hui
- Robert Siu as Wah Yam
- Lee Lung-kei as San Pei
- Lily Li as Lady San
- Mak Ka-lun as Emperor Hin
- Bruce Li Hung Kit as Kong Rong

== List of featured songs ==
All the songs were composed by Joseph Koo while Chan Siu Kei provided the lyrics.

- Shui Chung Sin (水中仙; Water Goddess) - the opening theme song performed by Steven Ma
- Lau Sa (流沙; Quicksand) - the ending theme song performed by Steven Ma and Rain Li
- Sik Fa (惜花; Cherish the Flower) - insert song performed by Priscilla Ku

== Awards and nominations ==
TVB Anniversary Awards (2002)

- My Favourite Character (Steven Ma)
- My Favourite Character (Ada Choi)
- Most Improved Male Artiste (Moses Chan)
- Nominated: Best Actor (Steven Ma) - Top 5
- Nominated: Best Actress (Ada Choi) - Top 5

== See also ==
- God of River Lok
- List of media adaptations of Romance of the Three Kingdoms
