= 洛神 =

洛神, meaning ‘The Goddess of the Luo River’, is a woman in Chinese mythology, she was implied to Lady Zhen by Cao Zhi.

It may refer to:

- God of River Lok, 1975 Hong Kong television series produced by TVB
- God of the River Luo, 1994 Taiwanese opera starring Yang Li-hua
- Goddess of the Luo River, 1957 repertoire starring Yim Fun Fong
- Legend of Goddess Luo (新洛神), 2013 Chinese television series starring Yang Yang
- Where the Legend Begins, 2002 Hong Kong television series produced by TVB
- Roselle, species of flowering plant, luòshénhuā (洛神花) in Chinese
