= Princess Dongxiang =

Daughter of Cao Pi and Lady Zhen

Princess Dongxiang 東鄉公主
- Born: After 207
- Died: Unknown
- House: House of Cao
- Father: Cao Pi
- Mother: Lady Zhen

Princess Dongxiang (東鄉公主, b. after 207) was an Imperial princess of the state of Cao Wei during the Three Kingdoms period of China. She was a daughter of Cao Pi, the first emperor of Cao Wei, and Lady Zhen. Thus, she was also a (younger) sister of Cao Rui, the second emperor of Cao Wei, who succeeded their father. Her father Cao Pi eventually orchestrated a coup d'état against the Han dynasty to establish the state of Cao Wei.

== Biography ==
She was the granddaughter of Cao Cao, a warlord who initiated the formation of the state of Cao Wei, and Lady Bian, who would become Grand Empress Dowager after the death of Cao Cao and her son Cao Pi. In 216, Cao Cao launched a campaign to attack the southeastern warlord Sun Quan, leading to the Battle of Ruxu in 217. The future Princess Dongxiang accompanied her grandfather on the campaign and stayed there for a year along with her brother Cao Rui and her grandmother Lady Bian.

When Princess Dongxiang and her family returned to Ye in late 217 after the campaign, Lady Bian's attendants were surprised to see that Lady Zhen was very cheerful. They asked, "Lady, you've not seen your children for about a year. We thought you would miss them and be worried about them, but yet you're so optimistic. Why is that so?" Lady Zhen laughed and replied, "Why should I be worried when (Cao) Rui and the others are with Madam (Lady Bian)?"

After Cao Cao died in March 220, Cao Pi inherited his title as the King of Wei, and later that year forced Emperor Xian to abdicate in his favor, ending the Han dynasty and establishing the state of Cao Wei. Shortly after, Lady Zhen was forced to commit suicide in August 221 by Cao Pi, due to accusations made by Lady Guo. After Lady Zhen's death, Princess Dongxiang and Cao Rui were left in Lady Guo's care. After Cao Pi's death, Cao Rui succeeded him and granted Lady Zhen's family many titles and lands. It is unknown whether the imperial title given to Princess Dongxiang was during the reign of Cao Pi or Cao Rui.

In some variations on her artistic image, Princess Dongxiang lived through the rise of the Sima family and continued to support the fading Cao family.

== Popular culture ==
=== TV series ===
- Zhao Yunzhuo portrayed Princess Dongxiang in the 2017 TV series The Advisors Alliance.
- Princess Dongxiang is featured in the 2013 series Legend of Goddess Luo (新洛神) as Cao Ying (曹瑛), the actress who portrayed her is unknown.

=== Games ===
- Princess Dongxiang appears with the name "Cao Ling" (曹綾) in the game Legend of Jiang Wei (三國志姜維傳), a popular Taiwanese mod of Sangokushi Sōsōden.
