= Battle of Hefei (234) =

Battle between Cao Wei and Eastern Wu in 234

- Part of the wars of the Three Kingdoms period
Date	c. June – September 234
Location	Hefei, Anhui, China
Result	Overall Wei Victory; Eastern Wu retreat

Belligerents
Cao Wei	Eastern Wu

Commanders and leaders
Man Chong; Tian Yu; Zhang Ying; Liu Shao	Sun Quan; Sun Tai †

Battle of Hefei
- Traditional Chinese: 合肥之戰
- Simplified Chinese: 合肥之战
Transcriptions
Standard Mandarin
- Hanyu Pinyin: Héféi zhī zhàn

Battle of Hefei Xincheng
- Traditional Chinese: 合肥新城之戰
- Simplified Chinese: 合肥新城之战
Transcriptions
Standard Mandarin
- Hanyu Pinyin: Héféi Xīnchéng zhī zhàn

The Battle of Hefei, also known as the Battle of Hefei Xincheng, was fought between the contending states of Cao Wei and Eastern Wu from roughly June to September 234 during the Three Kingdoms period of China. It would be Wu's last major battle at Hefei during Sun Quan's reign.

== Background ==
Around March 234, Shu Han's chancellor Zhuge Liang launched a Northern Expedition against Wei for the fifth time. Shu requested assistance from its ally, Wu, to attack Wei together, and the Wu emperor Sun Quan agreed.

== The battle ==
Around June or July, Sun Quan's army, claimed to be 100,000 strong, garrisoned near Chao Lake. Sun Quan personally led his troops to attack Wei's fortress at Xincheng (新城; literally: "new city/fortress"), Hefei. On the other hand, he also sent his generals Lu Xun and Zhuge Jin to garrison at Jiangxia (江夏) and Miankou (沔口), and they would attack Xiangyang from there. A third Wu army, led by Sun Shao and Zhang Cheng advanced towards Guangling (廣陵) and Huaiyin (淮陰). In total, Wu was attacking Wei from three directions.

In July or early August, the Wei general Man Chong wanted to lead reinforcements to support Zhang Ying (張穎), who was in charge of defending Xincheng. However, Tian Yu opposed Man Chong's idea, as he thought that Xincheng's defences were adequate, and was worried that the Wu army might turn around to attack the Wei relief force. At that time, many Wei military personnel were on leave, so Man Chong requested for them to be recalled back, and gather them to resist the enemy. The Wei emperor Cao Rui disagreed with Man Chong's view, as he felt that Hefei, Xiangyang, and Mount Qi (祁山) were the three most important positions on Wei's eastern, southern and western borders respectively, so they already had sufficient defences. Liu Shao felt that Man Chong should focus on defending instead of attacking, because of the Wu forces' high morale; the Wei court would first send 5,000 infantry and 3,000 cavalry to relieve Xincheng, and the troops should be spaced further apart, with more flags, banners, and war drums added, so as to create an impression of a large army. Liu Shao predicted that the Wu forces would retreat upon seeing the arrival of this "large army". The Wei emperor Cao Rui approved Liu Shao's strategy and despatched the suggested relief force.

In August or early September, Cao Rui personally led a naval fleet east to lift the siege on Xincheng. Man Chong recruited several men to set fire to the Wu army's siege engines, and Sun Quan's nephew Sun Tai (孫泰) was killed in the battle. At that time, many Wu soldiers were ill and Sun Quan decided to withdraw his troops when he learnt that Cao Rui's army was approaching. Sun Shao and Zhang Cheng also pulled back their forces when they heard that Sun Quan had withdrawn, while Lu Xun pressed on the attack at Xiangyang for some time but also retreated later.

== In popular culture ==
The battle is featured as a playable stage in Koei's video game series Dynasty Warriors. In the games, the battle is known as the "Battle of Hefei Castle", and is not to be confused with another stage (Battle of Hefei), which refers to the Battle of Xiaoyao Ford.
