= God of River Lok =

- Chinese: 洛神
- Hanyu Pinyin: Luò Shén
- Jyutping: Lok3 San4
- Genre: Costume drama
- Screenplay by: Yu Lap-kong
- Directed by: Chung King-fai
- Starring: Miu Kam-fung; Adam Cheng; Leung Tin; Chan Yau-hau; Wong Man-lei
- Theme music composer: Kong Nam; Kong Hoi
- Country of origin: Hong Kong
- Original language: Cantonese
- No. of episodes: 7

Production
- Executive producer: Chung King-fai
- Production location: Hong Kong
- Running time: 60 minutes per episode
- Production company: TVB

Original release
- Network: TVB Jade
- Release: 30 March 1975

God of River Lok is a Hong Kong television series produced by TVB. Set in the Three Kingdoms period, the story is about the romance between Zhen Fu (Cantonese: Yan Fuk) and Cao Zhi (Cantonese: Cho Chik). The series has seven episodes, each roughly 60 minutes long. It was first aired in Hong Kong on TVB Jade on 30 March 1975.

== Cast ==
Note: Some of the characters' names are in Cantonese romanisation.

- Miu Kam-fung as Yan Fuk
- Adam Cheng as Cho Chik
- Leung Tin as Cho Pei
- Chan Yau-hau as Cho Cho
- Kam Hing-yin as Cho Cheung
- Wong Man-lei as Lady Bin
- Cheng Tze-tuen as Ng Jat
- Yuen Ling-to as Cho Kim-fai
- Leung Chau-mei as Tsui Fa
- Chan Kei as Yau-sim
- Kwan Chung as Yeung Sau
- Chow Kat as Tsui Yim
- Tam Chuen-hing as Hui Chu
- Poon Sin-kei as Wong Tsan
- Ching Hor-wai as Lady Tsui
- Ng Man-tat as Ting Yi
- Ng Man-ka as Lau Jing
- Chow Yun-fat as Tsui Fong
- Wong Sun as Sze-ma Yi
- Lam Ka-yi as imperial physician
- Lau Kam-kwan as ceremonial official

== See also ==
- Where the Legend Begins
- List of media adaptations of Romance of the Three Kingdoms
