= Cao Xiong =

Son of Chinese warlord Cao Cao

Cao Xiong 曹熊
- Born: Unknown
- Died: Unknown
- Issue: Cao Bing (曹炳)
Posthumous name
- Prince Huai (懷王)
- House: House of Cao
- Father: Cao Cao
- Mother: Empress Wuxuan

Cao Xiong (fl.200s - 210s) was a son of Cao Cao, a warlord who rose to power towards the end of the Han dynasty and laid the foundation of the state of Cao Wei in the Three Kingdoms period of China. Not much was recorded in history about Cao Xiong, except that he died at a relatively young age. His mother was Lady Bian, who also bore Cao Cao another three sons – Cao Pi, Cao Zhang and Cao Zhi. Cao Xiong was the youngest of the four.

In 221, after Cao Pi ended the Han dynasty and established Wei, he granted Cao Xiong the posthumous title "Duke Huai of Xiao" (蕭懷公). In 229, during the reign of Cao Pi's son Cao Rui, Cao Xiong was posthumously elevated to the status of a prince, so his posthumous title became "Prince Huai of Xiao" (蕭懷王).

== Succession ==
In 234, Cao Xiong's son, Cao Bing (曹炳), was granted a princedom with 2,500 taxable households. The princedom was named "Xiao" (蕭), per Cao Xiong's posthumous title. In 238, Cao Bing died without issue and his princedom was abolished. He was given the posthumous name "Prince Ai" (哀王).

== In Romance of the Three Kingdoms ==
Cao Xiong was briefly mentioned in the 14th-century historical novel Romance of the Three Kingdoms. In 220, when Cao Cao died, Cao Xiong refused to go to Luoyang to attend his father's funeral. Acting on Hua Xin's suggestion, Cao Pi sent a messenger to reprimand his brother, but the messenger returned later and reported that Cao Xiong had hanged himself for fear of receiving punishment. Cao Pi had his brother buried with full honours and gave him the posthumous title "Prince Huai of Xiao".

== See also ==
- Lists of people of the Three Kingdoms
