= Liu Shao =

Liu Shao may refer to:

- Liu Shao (Three Kingdoms), an official of Cao Wei (also known as the Kingdom of Wei) during the Three Kingdoms period
- Liu Shao (Liu Song), an emperor of the Liu Song dynasty in 453, after assassinating his father, Emperor Wen of Liu Song
