= Empress Wuxuan =

Empress Wuxuan may refer to:

- Empress Dowager Bian (159–230), empress dowager of Cao Wei, Cao Pi's mother
- Liu E (Han Zhao) (died 314), empress of Han Zhao, Liu Cong's third wife
