= Empress Wende =

Empress Wende may refer to:

- Guo Nüwang (184–235), Cao Pi's empress during the Cao Wei dynasty
- Empress Zhangsun (601–636), Emperor Taizong of Tang's empress
