= Cao Xie =

Son of Cao Pi and Prince of Zan

Cao Xie 曹協

Prince of Zan (贊王) (posthumous)
- Successor: Cao Xun
- Born: Unknown
- Died: Unknown
- Issue: Cao Xun
Names
- Family name: Cao (曹); Given name: Xie (協)
Posthumous name
- Prince Ai (哀王)
- House: House of Cao
- Father: Cao Pi
- Mother: Lady Li

Cao Xie (fl. third century) was a prince in the state of Cao Wei in the Three Kingdoms period of China. He was a son of Cao Pi, the first emperor of Wei. His mother, whose maiden family name was Li (李), was a concubine of Cao Pi holding the rank of guiren (貴人; translated "Honoured Lady"). He died early and was posthumously honoured as Duke Shang of Jing (經殤公) in 231 by his half-brother, Cao Rui. In 234, Cao Rui posthumously promoted him to a prince under a new posthumous title: Prince Ai of Zan (贊哀王).

In 235, Cao Xie's only son, Cao Xun (曹尋), inherited the princedom posthumously awarded to his father, and became the Prince of Zan (贊王). In 239, the emperor Cao Fang increased the number of taxable households in Cao Xun's princedom by 500, bringing it up to a total of 3,000. When Cao Xun died in 249, he was posthumously honoured as "Prince Shang" (殤王). As he had no son to succeed him, his princedom was abolished.

== See also ==
- Cao Wei family trees#Consorts Li, Su, Zhang, and Song
- Lists of people of the Three Kingdoms
