= Empress Mingdao =

Empress of Cao Wei (died 237)

Empress Mao 毛皇后

Empress consort of Cao Wei
- Tenure: 26 December 227 – 22 September 237
- Predecessor: Empress Wende
- Successor: Empress Mingyuan
- Born: Unknown
- Died: 22 September 237 (Note: Cao Rui's biography in the Sanguozhi recorded that Empress Mao died on the geng'chen day of the 9th month of the 1st year of the Jing'chu era of Cao Rui's reign. This date corresponds to 22 September 237 in the Gregorian calendar.)
- Spouse: Cao Rui
- Issue: Cao Yin, Prince Ai of Anping
Posthumous name
- Empress Mingdao (明悼皇后)
- Father: Mao Jia (毛嘉)

Empress Mao (fl. 223 – 22 September 237), personal name unknown, formally known as Empress Mingdao, was an empress of the state of Cao Wei during the Three Kingdoms period of China. Born to a lowly family, she was married to Cao Rui, the second emperor of Wei, but would later lose favor and her life.

== Life and background ==
Lady Mao hailed from a poor family from Henei; her father Mao Jia (毛嘉) was a carpenter in the Department of Public Works. She became a concubine of Cao Rui during the reign of his father, Cao Pi when Cao Rui was Prince of Pingyuan and Lady Yu, also from Henei, was the chief wife. However, Cao Rui was noted to show great favor to Mao, often sharing a carriage with her.

When Cao Rui became emperor in June 226 following his father's death, Mao was made a Noble Lady, and it wasn't till late 227 that the new Emperor picked his empress, with grain given out to those who had lost their spouse, the childless, orphans and the helpless. Mao was made Empress, to the annoyance of Lady Yu who told Rui's grandmother, the Empress Dowager Bian, that the Cao clan's failure to pick an Empress from a proper background would bring down the state. Lady Yu was promptly sent away. While Rui was known to favor Mao, the selection also fitted the Cao family's controversial policy of the chief wife being from the lower classes rather than to grant such a position to a gentry family like Lady Yu's. The commentator Sun Sheng used this marriage to criticize the Cao policy of marrying the lower classes and included such marriages as a reason for the dynasty's future fall.

Soon after, Cao Rui ennobled her father Jia and gave her brother Mao Zeng (毛曾) a court position, and would continue to show the family great favor. However, when Cao Rui ordered officials to go to Mao Jia's house for banquets and events, Mao Jia's foolish behavior including calling himself “Lordly Person” made him a mockery at court while Xiahou Xuan could not hide his displeasure at being seated next to Zeng at one event.

Over time, Consort Guo became Cao Rui's favored concubine and Empress Mao began losing favor. Things came to a head in September 237 when Cao Rui hosted a party in the Rear Palace for the senior concubines with music and merriment. Consort Guo requested that Empress Mao be invited to join as well, but Cao Rui refused and further ordered that no news about the feast be given to Empress Mao. However, Empress Mao knew of the party and pointedly asked the next day, “Was yesterday’s party in the northern garden pleasant?”. Cao Rui believed someone had leaked the news to Empress Mao; the usually tolerant Emperor killed over ten of his attendants, then ordered Empress Mao to commit suicide on 22 September. She was buried on 25 October 237 with honors befitting an empress, and her family remained honored.

== In Romance of the Three Kingdoms ==
Empress Mingdao is introduced in chapter 105 as the novel sets out Cao Rui's opulence and lack of restraint. Her background is ignored; initially beloved by Cao Rui, she becomes empress as soon as he becomes emperor. Neglected when he became more interested in Consort Guo, when Guo urges Cao Rui to invite the empress, he replied that he would eat or drink nothing if Mao was at the garden feast. With Cao Rui then missing for a month, Empress Mao and her ladies come to the Blue Flower Pavilion to entertain themselves when they hear music in the Fragrant Forest Park. Mao makes inquiries and is saddened to have heard what her husband had been up to. The next day, she spots Cao Rui from her carriage and inquired about the party. Scared by Cao Rui's violent reaction, she returns to her palace. Cao Rui then orders her death and immediately makes Guo empress; the court officials are too frightened to protest.

In the next chapter, after the destruction of Gongsun Yuan, Cao Rui is awoken during the middle of the night by a cold wind and in the darkness, he sees Empress Mao and some attendants. They come to his bed and demand his life; the frightened emperor then becomes mortally ill.

== See also ==
- Cao Wei family trees#Cao Rui
- Lists of people of the Three Kingdoms

== Notes ==
Chinese royalty
Preceded by Guo Nüwang	Empress of Cao Wei; 227–237	Succeeded by Empress Guo
