= Lady Yu (Cao Wei) =

Lady Yu (虞氏) was a Chinese noblewoman from Henan Province during the Three Kingdoms period (220-280 AD). She is best known as the wife of the future Emperor Cao Rui who was passed over for the role of Empress. She was sent away after voicing sharp criticism about the Cao family policy on marriage.

== Biography ==
Little is known of her life but she was from a prominent family. Lady Yu became wife to Cao Rui when he was Prince of Pingyuan. On 29 June 226 Cao Rui became Emperor, but it would not be till the winter of 227 he would choose his Empress, choosing Lady Mao instead of Lady Yu. Lady Mao had been favored while Cao Rui was a Prince but it was in line with the long-standing and controversial Cao marriage policy of the chief wife being from outside the gentry to prevent the in-laws being too powerful. Lady Yu was from a gentry clan, while the new Empress was the daughter of a carpenter, whose behavior as an in-law would be much mocked.

Cao Rui's grandmother Empress Dowager Bian, attempted to console Lady Yu at being passed over. However, Lady Yu was unhappy and, despite Bian's own background as a singer, launched a sharp attack on Cao marriage policy that Rafe De Crespigny describes as bitter and tactless. She accused the Cao family of raising up those of low birth rather than doing the right thing and raising up those of proper values (i.e. gentry ladies). An Empress was meant to manage the inner palace, a work complimenting that of an Emperor and if an Empress was poorly selected, it would end badly for the ruler. The Cao clan's choices would doom them as a state. This criticism of "the Caos have always preferred people of inferior quality. They have never managed to make appointments on the basis of good character" can also be seen as an attack on the Cao family's recruitment of officials from beyond powerful families and socially accepted norms.

Lady Yu was demoted and sent away from the palace to the Cao family stronghold in Ye. The latter part of her life remains undocumented but her criticism is quoted by Sima Guang's Zizhi Tongjian. It has also been used by modern historians like Robert Cutter, William Crowell and Rafe De Crespigny as a prominent example of the opposition to the Cao marriage policy.

== Sources ==
- Records of the Three Kingdoms, Volume Five, at Wikisource
