= Liu Shao (Three Kingdoms) =

3rd century Cao Wei state official and poet

- 劉劭

Regular Mounted Attendant (散騎常侍)
- In office ?–?
- Monarch: Cao Rui

Cavalry Commandant (騎都尉)
- In office ?–?
- Monarch: Cao Rui

Administrator of Chenliu (陳留太守)
- In office c.226 – ?
- Monarch: Cao Rui

Personal details
- Born: Unknown Handan, Hebei
- Died: 240s
- Children: Liu Lin
- Occupation: Official
- Courtesy name: Kongcai (孔才)
- Peerage: Secondary Marquis (關內侯)

Liu Shao (fl. 190s–240s), courtesy name Kongcai (Chinese: 孔才), was an official of the state of Cao Wei during the Three Kingdoms period of China. He often provided advice to the emperor Cao Rui, and was praised by Cao Rui for his good advice, even though Cao Rui did not frequently actually act on the advice. He also wrote poems to try to discourage Cao Rui from military and palace-building projects. When Sun Quan, the emperor of Wei's rival state Eastern Wu, led an army to attack the Wei stronghold at Hefei in 234, Liu Shao suggested to Cao Rui to send his forces to cut off Sun Quan's supply route rather than engage Sun Quan directly – a strategy that forced Sun Quan to withdraw. (However, according to Sima Guang's Zizhi Tongjian, it was Tian Yu who offered this advice, not Liu Shao.)

Liu Shao was also the author of the People Records (人物志), an early Chinese treatise on human character.

== See also ==
- Lists of people of the Three Kingdoms
