= Zhai Tianlin =

Chinese actor

- Born: February 15, 1987 (age 39); Qingdao, Shandong, China
- Occupation: Actor
- Years active: 2003－2019; 2024－present

Chinese name
- Traditional Chinese: 翟天臨
- Simplified Chinese: 翟天临
Transcriptions
Standard Mandarin
- Hanyu Pinyin: Zhái Tiānlín

Zhai Tianlin (simplified Chinese: 翟天临; traditional Chinese: 翟天臨; pinyin: Zhái Tiānlín, born 15 February 1987) is a Chinese actor. He received a bachelor's degree in acting from the Performing Arts School at the Beijing Film Academy in 2006, completed a master's degree in acting in 2013, and earned his PhD in film studies in 2018.

In February 2019, questions arose regarding the validity of Zhai's doctoral work after he was publicly unable to identify CNKI, China's main academic database, during a livestream. The Beijing Film Academy subsequently established an investigation committee, and on 19 February 2019 his PhD degree was revoked for plagiarism.

From 2018 to 2024, Zhai was in a relationship with actress Xin Zhilei.

== Awards and nominations ==
Year	Award	Category	Nominated work	Result	Ref.
2017	4th The Actors of China Award Ceremony	Best Actor (Emerald)	—N/a	Won	
