= Tian Yu =

General of Chinese state of Cao Wei (c. 171– c. 252)

- 田豫

Palace Counsellor (太中大夫)
- In office ? – c.252?
- Monarch: Cao Fang

Minister of the Guards (衛尉)
- In office ? – c.252?
- Monarch: Cao Fang

Inspector of Bing Province (并州刺史)
- In office c.240 – ?
- Monarch: Cao Fang

General Who Inspires Might (振威將軍)
- In office c.240 – ?
- Monarch: Cao Fang

General of the Household Who Protects the Xiongnu (護匈奴中郎將)
- In office c.240 – ?
- Monarch: Cao Fang

General Who Eliminates the Yi (殄夷將軍)
- In office ?–?
- Monarch: Cao Pi / Cao Rui

Administrator of Runan (汝南太守)
- In office ?–?
- Monarch: Cao Pi / Cao Rui

Colonel Who Protects the Wuhuan (護烏丸校尉)
- In office c.early 220s – c.230
- Monarch: Cao Pi

Personal details
- Born: between 159 and 173 Wuqing District, Tianjin
- Died: between 240 and 254 (aged 81) (Note: Tian Yu's biography in the Sanguozhi recorded that he died at the age of 82 (by East Asian age reckoning) sometime early in Cao Fang's reign. However, the exact year was not mentioned. Tian Yu had definitely died by 254 (6th year of the Jiaping era), where he was posthumously honoured along with Xu Miao (徐邈) and Hu Zhi (胡质).)
- Children: Tian Pengzu; one daughter
- Occupation: General
- Courtesy name: Guorang (國讓)
- Peerage: Marquis of Changle Village (長樂亭侯) (Note: Per Tian Yu's biography in Sanguozhi, he was given this title after he convinced Xianbei chieftain Suli (素利) to kill the bandit Gao Ai (高艾), who had been menacing You and Ji Prefectures. However, it is unknown whether this enfeoffment took place during Cao Pi's or Cao Rui's reign.)

Tian Yu (c.171 – c.252), courtesy name Guorang, was a military general of the state of Cao Wei during the Three Kingdoms period of China.

== Life ==
Tian Yu was from Yongnu County (雍奴縣), Yuyang Commandery (漁陽郡), which is present-day Wuqing District, Tianjin. During Liu Bei's stay with Gongsun Zan, the young Tian Yu placed himself under Liu Bei's foster care, and Liu Bei was greatly impressed by Tian Yu. When Liu Bei was Inspector of Yu Province, Tian Yu left to care for his ageing mother; Liu Bei tearfully expressed his regret at not being able to work with Tian Yu.

Later Tian Yu served under Gongsun Zan as the Prefect of Dongzhou County (東州縣). One of Gongsun Zan's generals, Wang Men (王門), betrayed Gongsun Zan and joined Yuan Shao, and lead an attack on his former master with more than 10,000 troops. Tian Yu personally visited Wang Men and managed to shame the latter into retreating. Although Gongsun Zan knew of Tian Yu's intellect, he could not appoint important roles for Tian Yu. After Gongsun Zan's defeat, Tian Yu's friend Xianyu Fu hired him as an adjutant. He recommended that Xianyu Fu join Cao Cao, who subsequently hired Tian Yu as well in various official positions.

=== Service under Cao Pi ===
After Cao Cao's son Cao Pi deposed Emperor Xian of Han in November 220 and crowned himself emperor in December that year, Tian Yu continued to serve Cao Wei.

=== Service under Cao Rui ===
Tian Yu was appointed Colonel Who Protects the Wuhuan early in Cao Pi's reign and he served in the position for about nine years with distinction. However, cronies of the Inspector of You Prefecture Wang Xiong (王雄; grandfather of Wang Rong and Wang Yan) wanted Wang to have the position. Thus, they slandered Tian Yu as causing disruption at the border and creating trouble for the state. Tian Yu was then appointed Administrator of Ru'nan and General Who Eliminates the Yi.

In 232, Sun Quan sent Zhou He (周贺) and Pei Qian (裴潜; not the same person as Pei Xiu's father) to buy horses from Gongsun Yuan. Zhou He and co. were later ambushed and killed by Tian Yu at Chengshan (成山). (Note: In the Sanguozhi, there was a discrepancy on when Tian Yu attacked Zhou He and co. Cao Rui's biography dated the attack to the 10th month of the 6th year of the Taihe era. However, in Sun Quan's biography, the attack was dated to the 9th month of the 1st year of the Jiahe era. The two months correspond to 1 to 29 Nov and 2 to 30 Oct 232 in the Julian calendar.)

Towards the end of the Jingchu era (237 - 239), Tian Yu's fiefdom was increased by 300 households, to a total of 500 households.

=== Service under Cao Fang ===
In the early part of the Zhengshi era (240-249) of Cao Fang's reign, Tian Yu was made General of the Household Who Protects the Xiongnu, General Who Inspires Might and Inspector of Bing Province. During his tenure, foreign minorities were in awe of him and one by one, they brought tribute. The border regions became peaceful and quiet, and this was cherished by the residents. Later, he was also appointed Minister of the Guards. By then in his 70s, Tian Yu frequently requested to resign his positions; the Grand Tutor Sima Yi thought that Tian was still fit enough to carry out his duties and so rejected his requests. As a reply, Tian Yu wrote, "To be occupying positions above the age of 70 is like continuing to travel at night even after bells had been rung and the water clocks had run out; it is a crime." Tian then insisted that he was gravelly ill. As such, he was appointed Palace Counsellor, and continued to draw a salary.

Tian Yu died at the age of 82 (by East Asian reckoning) in the 240s or early 250s, and his peerage was inherited by his son Tian Pengzu.

== See also ==
- Lists of people of the Three Kingdoms
