= Yuan Xi =

Chinese warlord Yuan Shao's second son (died 207)

- 袁熙

Inspector of You Province (幽州刺史)
- In office ? – 207
- Monarch: Emperor Xian of Han

Personal details
- Born: Unknown
- Died: 207 Liaoyang, Liaoning
- Spouse: Lady Zhen
- Parent: Yuan Shao (father)
- Relatives: Yuan Tan (brother); Yuan Shang (brother)
- Occupation: Military general and politician
- Courtesy name: Xianyi (顯奕) / Xianyong (顯雍)

Yuan Xi (died c.December 207), courtesy name Xianyi or Xianyong, was a Chinese military general and politician. He was the second son of Yuan Shao, a warlord who controlled much of northern China during the late Eastern Han dynasty. He was executed along with his brother Yuan Shang by Gongsun Kang.

Yuan Xi's wife, Lady Zhen, was taken as a wife by Cao Cao's son, Cao Pi, while Yuan Xi was still alive.

== Descendants ==
Yuan Shuji, a Tang dynasty chancellor, was a descendant of Yuan Xi.

== In Romance of the Three Kingdoms ==
Yuan Xi was described in the 14th-century historical novel Romance of the Three Kingdoms as "intelligent but weak and indecisive", in contrast to his older brother Yuan Tan, who was described as "brave but impulsive and violent". After the combined forces of Yuan Xi and his younger brother Yuan Shang was defeated in battle against Cao Cao in the follow-up battles after the Battle of Guandu, he fled to Liaodong with Yuan Shang and stayed with administrator Gongsun Kang, hoping to one day take over Gongsun's forces and have their revenge on Cao Cao. However, they were themselves betrayed and were killed in an ambush set up by Gongsun, who instead wanted to join Cao's forces.

== See also ==
- Lists of people of the Three Kingdoms
