= Lady Zhen =

Wife of Cao Pi, ruler of Cao Wei (183–221)

Lady Zhen; 甄夫人 / 甄氏
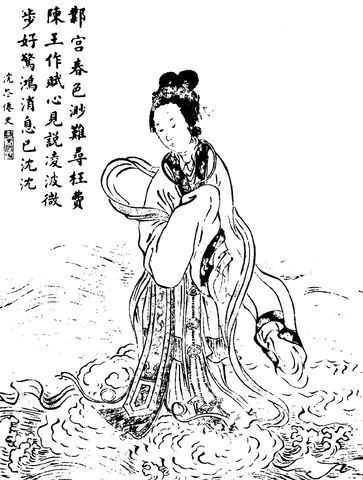
- Qing dynasty illustration of Lady Zhen
- Born: 26 January 183 (Note: The Wei Shu mentioned that Lady Zhen was born on the dingyou day of the 12th lunar month in the fifth year of the Guanghe era (178–184) in the reign of Emperor Ling of the Eastern Han dynasty. This date corresponds to 26 January 183 in the Julian calendar.); Wuji County, Hebei, Eastern Han
- Died: 4 August 221 (aged 38) (Note: Cao Pi's biography in Sanguozhi mentioned that Lady Zhen died on the dingmao day of the 6th month of the 2nd year of the Huangchu era (220–226) in Cao Pi's reign. This date corresponds to 4 August 221 in the Julian calendar.) (Note: An annotation from the Wei Shu in Lady Zhen's biography in Sanguozhi confirms Zhen's death date as stated in Cao Pi's biography.); Handan, Hebei, Wei
- Spouse: Yuan Xi; Cao Pi
- Issue: Cao Rui; Princess Dongxiang
Posthumous name
- Empress Wenzhao (文昭皇后)
- Father: Zhen Yi
- Mother: Lady Zhang

Lady Zhen (26 January 183 – 4 August 221), personal name unknown, was the first wife of Cao Pi, the first ruler of the state of Cao Wei in the Three Kingdoms period. In 226, she was posthumously honoured as Empress Wenzhao when her son Cao Rui succeeded Cao Pi as the emperor of Wei.

== Early life ==
Lady Zhen was from Wuji County (無極縣), Zhongshan Commandery (中山郡), which is in present-day Wuji County, Hebei. She was a descendant of Zhen Han (甄邯), who served as a Grand Protector (太保) in the late Western Han dynasty and later the General-in-Chief (大將軍) during the short-lived Xin dynasty. Her father, Zhen Yi (甄逸), served as the Prefect of Shangcai County in the late Eastern Han dynasty. He died when Lady Zhen was about three years old. Lady Zhen's mother, whose maiden family name was Zhang (張), was from Changshan Commandery (常山郡; around present-day Zhengding County, Hebei). Lady Zhen's parents had three sons and five daughters: eldest son Zhen Yu (甄豫), who died early; second son Zhen Yan (甄儼), who became a xiaolian and later served as an assistant to the General-in-Chief and as the Chief of Quliang County; third son Zhen Yao (甄堯), who was also a xiaolian; eldest daughter Zhen Jiang (甄姜); second daughter Zhen Tuo (甄脫); third daughter Zhen Dao (甄道); fourth daughter Zhen Rong (甄榮). Lady Zhen was the youngest of the five daughters.

Zhen Yi once brought his children to meet Liu Liang (劉良), a fortune teller, who commented on Lady Zhen, "This girl will become very noble in the future." Unlike many children of her age, the young Lady Zhen did not enjoy playing. Once, when she was eight years old (by East Asian reckoning), her sisters went to the balcony to watch a group of horse-riding performers outside their house but Lady Zhen did not join in. Her sisters were puzzled so they asked her, and she responded, "Is this something a girl should watch?" When she was nine years old (by East Asian reckoning), she became interested in scholarly arts and started reading books and using her brothers' writing materials. Her brothers told her, "You should be learning what women traditionally do (such as weaving). When you picked up reading, were you thinking of becoming a female academician?" Lady Zhen replied, "I heard that virtuous women in history learnt from the successes and failures of those who lived before them. If they didn't read, how did they learn all that?"

Towards the end of the Eastern Han dynasty, after the death of Emperor Ling, China entered a chaotic period because the central government's authority weakened, and regional officials and warlords started fighting each other in a bid to gain supremacy. The common people suffered from poverty and hunger, and many wealthy households who owned expensive items such as jewellery offered to sell these valuables in return for food. Lady Zhen's family had large stockpiles of grain, and they planned to take advantage of the situation to sell their grain in exchange for valuable items. Lady Zhen, who about 10 years old at the time, said to her mother, "It's not wrong to own expensive items, but in this chaotic era, owning such items has become a wrongdoing. Our neighbours are suffering from hunger, so why don't we distribute our surplus grain to our fellow townsfolk? This is an act of graciousness and kindness." Her family praised her for her suggestion and heeded her advice.

When Lady Zhen was 14, her second brother Zhen Yan (甄儼) died, and she was deeply grieved. She continued to show respect towards Zhen Yan's widow, and even helped to raise Zhen Yan's son. Lady Zhen's mother was particularly strict towards her daughters-in-law and treated them harshly. Lady Zhen told her mother, "It's unfortunate that Second Brother died early. Second Sister-in-Law became widowed at such a young age and she's now left with only her son. You should treat your daughters-in-law better and love them as you would love your own daughters." Lady Zhen's mother was so deeply touched that she cried, and she started treating her daughters-in-law better and allowed them to accompany and wait on her.

== Marriages to Yuan Xi and Cao Pi ==
Sometime in the middle of the Jian'an era (196–220) of the reign of Emperor Xian, Lady Zhen married Yuan Xi, the second son of Yuan Shao, a warlord who controlled much of northern China. Yuan Shao later put Yuan Xi in charge of You Province, so Yuan Xi left to assume his appointment. Lady Zhen did not follow her husband and remained in Ye (in present-day Handan, Hebei), the administrative centre of Yuan Shao's domain, to take care of her mother-in-law.

Yuan Shao lost to his rival, Cao Cao, at the Battle of Guandu in 200 CE and died two years later. After his death, his sons Yuan Tan and Yuan Shang became embroiled in internecine struggles over their father's vast domain. When the Yuan brothers were exhausted from their wars against each other, Cao Cao attacked and defeated them, swiftly conquering the territories that used to be controlled by the Yuans. In c.mid-September 204, (Note: Zizhi Tongjian recorded that Cao Cao's army entered Ye during the night of the wuyin day of the 8th month of Jian'an 9 (13 Sep 204 in the Julian calendar). Cao Cao's biography in Sanguozhi dated the event to the same month and year, without indicating a specific day; the month corresponds to 12 Sep to 11 Oct 204 in the Julian calendar. The year ends on 6 Feb 205.) Cao Cao defeated Yuan Shang at the Battle of Ye and his forces occupied the city; the population was then massacred. Cao Cao's forces seized control of the women of the Yuan household, who were often raped. Cao Cao's son, Cao Pi, entered Yuan Shao's residence and met Lady Liu (Yuan Shao's widow) and Lady Zhen. Lady Zhen was so terrified that she buried her face in her mother-in-law's lap. Cao Pi said, "What's going on, Madam Liu? Ask that lady to lift up her head!" Cao Pi was very impressed and entranced by Lady Zhen's beauty when he saw her. His father allowed him to marry her later.

Yuan Xi was still alive at the time. Yuan Shang came to join him after his defeat by Cao Cao. When Kong Rong heard of the marriage between Lady Zhen and Cao Pi, he wrote Cao Cao a letter, falsifying a parallel in ancient history, claiming King Wu of Zhou arranged marriage between his brother the Duke of Zhou and the beautiful consort Daji, lately the favourite of the defeated king Di Xin, and legendarily blamed for the downfall of the Shang dynasty. Thinking that Kong Rong was citing a classic text to praise him, Cao Cao asked about the source, but Kong merely said, "I saw what happened in our day and thought it must have been so."

In 207, Cao Cao defeated Yuan Xi, Yuan Shang and their Wuhuan allies at the Battle of White Wolf Mountain, after which they fled to Liaodong to join the warlord Gongsun Kang. Gongsun Kang feared that they would become a threat to him, so he lured them into a trap, executed them, and sent their heads to Cao Cao.

== As Cao Pi's wife ==
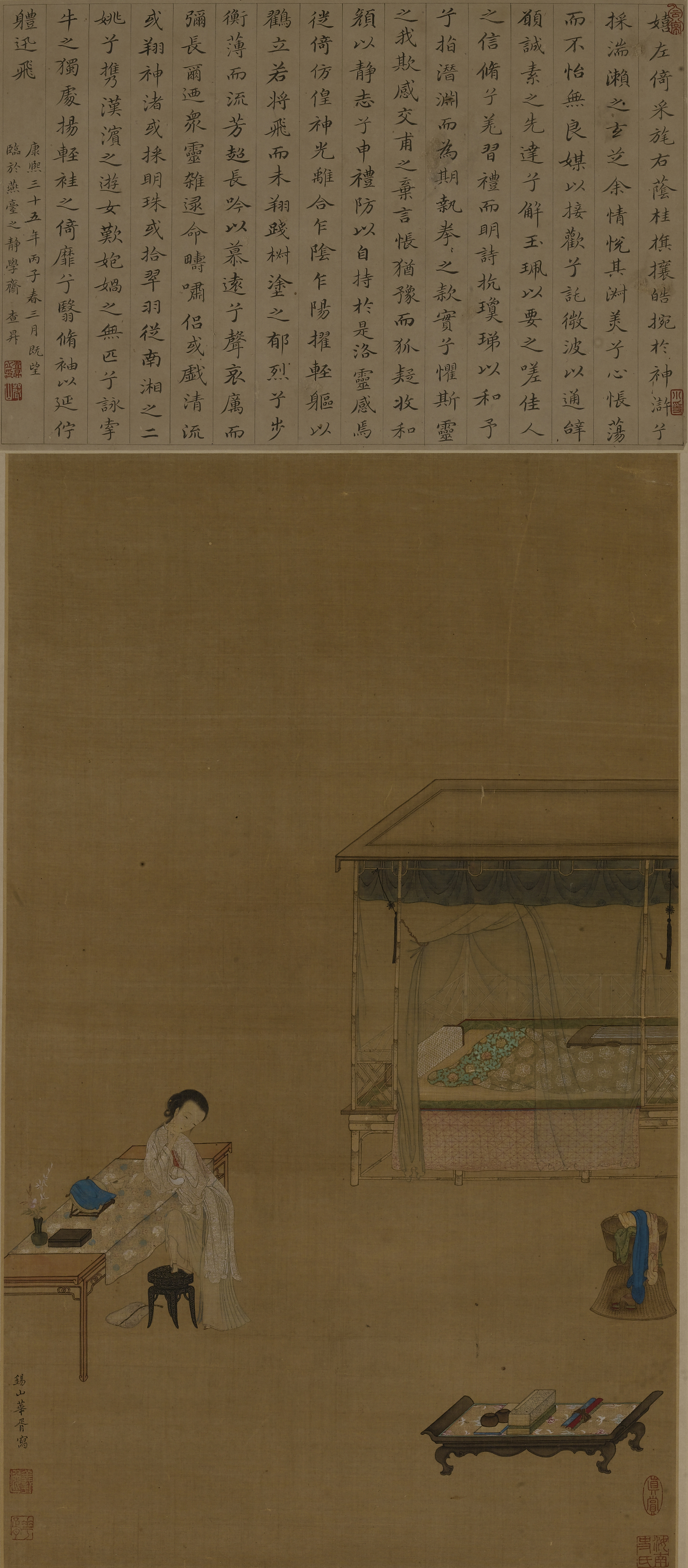
Consort Zhen at her Morning Toilette by Hua Xu (active c. 1799)

Lady Zhen bore Cao Pi a son and a daughter. Their son, Cao Rui, later became the second emperor of the state of Cao Wei in the Three Kingdoms period. Their daughter, whose personal name was not recorded in history, was referred to as "Princess Dongxiang" (東鄉公主; "Princess of the East District") in historical records. Lady Zhen remained humble even though Cao Pi deeply fancied her. She provided encouragement to Cao Pi's other wives who were also adored by him, and comforted those whom he less favoured. She also often urged Cao Pi to take more concubines so that he would have more descendants, citing the example of the mythical Yellow Emperor. Cao Pi was very pleased. Once, Cao Pi wanted to send Lady Ren (任氏), one of his concubines who fell out of favour with him, back to her family—which meant that he was divorcing her. When Lady Zhen heard about it, she told her husband, "Lady Ren comes from a reputable clan. I can't match her in terms of moral character and looks. Why do you want to send her away?" Cao Pi replied, "She is unruly, impulsive and disobedient. She has made me angry many times before. I'm sending her away." Lady Zhen wept and pleaded with her husband, "Everyone knows that you love and adore me, and they'll think that you're sending Lady Ren away because of me. I fear that I'll be ridiculed and accused of abusing your favour towards me. Please consider your decision again carefully." Cao Pi ignored her and sent Lady Ren away.

In 211, Cao Cao embarked on a campaign to attack a coalition of northwestern warlords led by Ma Chao and Han Sui, leading to the Battle of Tong Pass and the subsequent battles. Cao Cao's wife Lady Bian followed her husband and stayed at Meng Ford (孟津; present-day Mengjin County, Henan), while Cao Pi remained in Ye (in present-day Handan, Hebei). Lady Bian fell ill during that time. Lady Zhen became worried when she heard about it and she cried day and night. She constantly sent messengers to inquire her mother-in-law's condition, but refused to believe them when they reported that Lady Bian was getting better, and she became filled with greater anxiety. Lady Bian later wrote a letter to her, telling her that she had fully recovered, and only then did Lady Zhen's worries disappear. About a year later, when Lady Bian returned to Ye, Lady Zhen rushed to see her mother-in-law and displayed mixed expressions of sadness and joy. Those who were present were all deeply moved by the scene before them. Lady Bian assured Lady Zhen that her illness was not serious and praised her for her filial piety.

In 216, Cao Cao launched another campaign to attack the southeastern warlord Sun Quan, leading to the Battle of Ruxu in 217. Lady Bian, Cao Pi, Cao Rui and Princess Dongxiang all followed Cao Cao on the campaign, but Lady Zhen remained in Ye because she was sick. When Cao Pi and Lady Zhen's children returned to Ye in late 217 after the campaign, Lady Bian's attendants were surprised to see that Lady Zhen was very cheerful. They asked, "Lady, you've not seen your children for about a year. We thought you would miss them and be worried about them, but yet you're so optimistic. Why is that so?" Lady Zhen laughed and replied, "Why should I be worried when (Cao) Rui and the others are with Madam (Lady Bian)?"

== Death ==
After Cao Cao died in March 220, his vassal king title – "King of Wei" (魏王) – was inherited by Cao Pi. Later that year, Cao Pi forced Emperor Xian, whom he paid nominal allegiance to, to abdicate in his favour, effectively ending the Han dynasty. Cao Pi became the emperor and established the state of Cao Wei, which marked the beginning of the Three Kingdoms period. The dethroned Emperor Xian was reduced to the status of Duke of Shanyang (山陽公). The former emperor presented his two daughters to Cao Pi to be his concubines. Cao Pi began to favour his other concubines, especially Guo Nüwang. When Lady Zhen realised that Cao Pi favoured her less, she started complaining. Cao Pi was furious when he heard about it. On 4 August 221, he sent an emissary to Ye (in present-day Handan, Hebei) to execute Lady Zhen by forcing her to take her own life. She was buried in Ye in the same month. Several years after her death, during the reign of her son Cao Rui, Cao Rui ordered Lady Zhen to be worshiped at the ancestral temple in Ye on 20 March 227.

Lady Zhen's downfall was due to Guo Nüwang, whom Cao Pi fancied. One year after Lady Zhen's death, Cao Pi instated Guo as the empress despite opposition from an official, Zhan Qian (棧潛). The historical text Han–Jin Chunqiu (漢晉春秋) mentioned that Lady Zhen's body was desecrated after her death: her face was covered by her hair and rice husks were stuffed into her mouth. Cao Rui was raised by Guo Nüwang after Lady Zhen's death.

=== Alternative account of Lady Zhen's death ===
The Wei Shu (魏書) mentioned that Cao Pi issued an edict to Lady Zhen, asking her to move to the newly constructed Changqiu Palace (長秋宮) in Luoyang. Lady Zhen declined humbly, stating that she felt that she was not capable enough to manage the imperial harem, and also because she was ill. Cao Pi then consecutively sent another two edicts but Lady Zhen rejected both. It was around summer at the time. Cao Pi intended to fetch Lady Zhen from Ye to Luoyang in autumn, when the weather was cooler. However, Lady Zhen died of illness in Ye a few months later. Cao Pi mourned her death and posthumously elevated her to the status of an empress.

Pei Songzhi, who added the Wei Shu account to Lady Zhen's biography in Sanguozhi, found the account dubious. He believed that there were specific reasons as to why Cao Pi did not instate Lady Zhen as the empress after he became the emperor, and why he forced her to commit suicide. He suspected that Lady Zhen had probably committed an offence, which was not recorded in the official histories of the Cao Wei state.

=== Alternative theories on Lady Zhen's death ===
Many popular stories speculated that the reason for Lady Zhen's death was that she had a secret affair with Cao Pi's younger brother, Cao Zhi, even though this speculation is not supported by evidence and is improbable. She garnered a reputation as a great beauty, and some more fantastical accounts alleged that she was the cause for Cao Cao starting the Battle of Ye in 204.

== Posthumous honours ==
Cao Pi died on 29 June 226 and was succeeded by Cao Rui, who became the second ruler of Cao Wei. On 25 July 226, Cao Rui granted his mother the posthumous title "Empress Wenzhao", which means "cultured and diligent empress". Lady Zhen's family and relatives also received noble titles.

Xi Zuochi's historical text Han–Jin Chunqiu mentioned that Cao Rui had all along been aware of his mother's fate, and he was angry and sad about it. After he became emperor, his stepmother Guo Nüwang became the empress dowager. When he asked her about how his mother died, Guo replied, "The Late Emperor was the one who ordered her death, so why are you asking me? You're your father's son so you can blame your dead father. Are you going to kill your stepmother for your real mother?" Cao Rui turned furious and forced Empress Dowager Guo to commit suicide. He had her buried with the funeral rites befitting that of an empress, but also ordered her dead body to be treated in the same manner as she did to his mother: hair covering face, mouth stuffed with rice husks. However, Yu Huan's Weilüe stated that after Empress Dowager Guo died of illness in March 235, Cao Pi's concubine Lady Li (李夫人) told Cao Rui about the fate of his mother. Cao Rui was deeply aggrieved and he ordered Guo's dead body to be treated in the same manner as she did to his mother. Historian Lu Bi (盧弼) commented that Cao Rui – seventeen at the time of his mother's death – should have been aware of the circumstances rather than waiting for an explanation from Lady Li.

== Reliability of alternative historical sources on Lady Zhen's life ==
The authoritative historical source on Lady Zhen's life is Records of the Three Kingdoms (Sanguozhi), which was written by Chen Shou in the third century. In the fifth century, Pei Songzhi annotated Sanguozhi by incorporating information from other texts and adding his personal commentary. Some sources used in the annotations include Wei Shu (Book of Wei), by Wang Chen, Xun Yi and Ruan Ji; and Weilüe (Brief History of Wei), by Yu Huan. The original version of Lady Zhen's biography in Sanguozhi did not contain the anecdotes about Zhen's excellent moral conduct, such as her care for her family members, her filial piety towards her mother-in-law Lady Bian, her tolerance of Cao Pi's other wives, etc. These accounts, which were mostly documented in the Wei Shu and Weilüe, were later added to Sanguozhi by Pei Songzhi. In his commentary, Pei cast doubts on the anecdotes relating to the "virtuous deeds" of Lady Zhen and other noble ladies of Wei, because it was difficult to verify whether they were true or not due to a dearth of alternative sources. The Wei Shu and Weilüe were among the official histories of Cao Wei, so they were likely to be biased towards Lady Zhen. Hence, some of those anecdotes might have been fabricated by Wei historians to promote a positive image of Lady Zhen. Pei remarked that Chen Shou had done well in omitting the questionable information when he first compiled Sanguozhi.

== Personal name ==
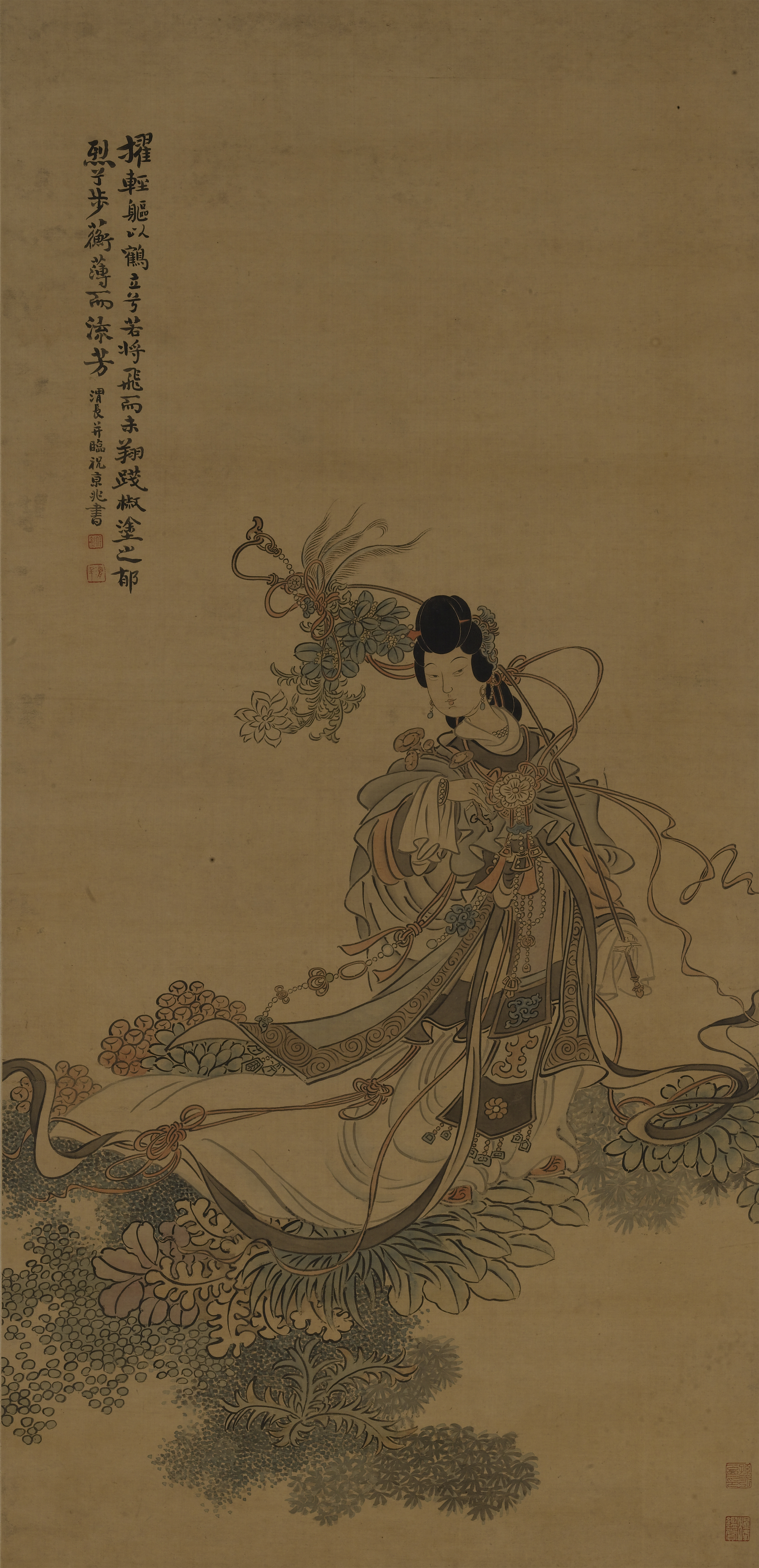
The Goddess of the Luo River, painted by Ren Xiong (1823–1857)

Lady Zhen's personal name was not recorded in any surviving historical text. All near-contemporary sources, such as Chen Shou's Sanguozhi and Xi Zuochi's Han–Jin Chunqiu, refer to her as "Lady Zhen" (甄氏), "Madam Zhen" (甄夫人), "Empress Zhen" (甄后), or simply "(the) Empress" (后).

The attachment of the names "Fu" (宓; Fú) and "Luo" (洛; Luò) to Lady Zhen came about due to the legend of a romance between her and Cao Zhi, which Robert Joe Cutter, a specialist in research on Cao Zhi, concludes to be "a piece of anecdotal fiction inspired by the [Luo Shen Fu (洛神賦; Rhapsody on the Goddess of the Luo)] and taking advantage of the possibilities inherent in a triangle involving a beautiful lady, an emperor, and his romanticised brother."

A tradition dating back to at least as far as an undated, anonymous note edited into the Tang dynasty writer Li Shan's annotated Wen Xuan had Cao Zhi meeting the ghost of the recently deceased Empress Zhen, and writing a poem originally titled Gan Zhen Fu (感甄賦; Rhapsody on Being Moved by Lady Zhen). Afterwards, Cao Rui found this poem about his uncle's love for his mother, and changed the title to Luo Shen Fu (洛神賦), which could be translated as Rhapsody on the Goddess of the Luo or Rhapsody on the Divine Luo, this second interpretation presumably referencing Lady Zhen's personal name, Luo. If true, this would be a forename unique to early China, as the Chinese character 洛 has been a toponym since it entered the language.

The poem contains references to the spirit of the Luo River, named Consort Fu (Chinese: 宓妃; pinyin: Fúfēi), interpreted as a proxy for Empress Zhen by those who believed in Cao Zhi's infatuation with her. This interpretation becomes less allusive if Empress Zhen's personal name was actually "Fu".

== See also ==
- Cao Wei family trees § Lady Zhen
- Lists of people of the Three Kingdoms
