= Guo Nüwang =

Empress Dowager of Cao Wei (184-235)

Guo Nüwang 郭女王

Empress dowager of Cao Wei
- Tenure: 29 June 226 – 14 March 235
- Predecessor: Empress Wuxuan
- Successor: Empress Mingyuan

Empress consort of Cao Wei
- Tenure: 31 October 222 – 29 June 226
- Successor: Empress Mingdao
- Born: 8 April 184
- Died: 14 March 235 (aged 50–51) (Note: Cao Rui's biography in the Sanguozhi recorded that Guo Nüwang died on the dingsi day of the 2nd month of the 3rd year of the Qinglong era of Cao Rui's reign. This date corresponds to 14 March 235 in the Julian calendar.)
- Spouse: Cao Pi
Posthumous name
- Empress Wende (文德皇后)
- Father: Guo Yong
- Mother: Lady Dong

Guo Nüwang (8 April 184 (Note: According to the Book of Wei by Wang Chen et al., Lady Guo was born on the yimao day of the 3rd month of the 1st year of the Zhongping era during the reign of Emperor Ling of Han. This corresponds to 8 April 184 on the Julian calendar.) – 14 March 235), formally known as Empress Wende, was an empress of the state of Cao Wei during the Three Kingdoms period of China. She was married to Cao Pi, the first emperor of Wei.

== Family background and marriage to Cao Pi ==
Her father Guo Yong (郭永) was once Administrator of Nanjun, and came from a line of minor local officials. When she was young, she was known for her intelligence, and her father, impressed by her talent, gave her the unusual style name "Nüwang" (literally "queen regnant"). Her parents died when she was young, however, and she became a maid or courtesan at the household of one Marquis of Tongdi. She has high musical skills and good at playing the pipa. It is not known how it came about, but she eventually became a concubine of Cao Pi when he was the heir apparent of the vassal kingdom of Wei under his father Cao Cao. She quickly became a favourite – so much so that he began to neglect his wife Lady Zhen, who was also known for her beauty. She gave Cao Pi shrewd political advice during the succession controversy that pitted Cao Pi against his brothers. Her biography in Sanguozhi goes further to state that when Cao Pi was finally designated heir, Guo Nuwang had a hand in planning it. Lady Zhen eventually lost Cao Pi's favour altogether by complaining that he favoured other women over her, and after he became emperor of Cao Wei in late 220 (after forcing Emperor Xian of Han to abdicate to him), he forced Lady Zhen to commit suicide in August 221. In October 222, he made Lady Guo empress.

== As empress consort ==
After Guo Nüwang became empress, she was said to have been a good leader of the imperial consorts, treating them well and disciplining them appropriately when they acted improperly, while hiding their faults from Cao Pi. She also appeared to have lived thriftily. Also, in 226, at the urging of her mother-in-law Empress Dowager Bian, she interceded on Cao Hong's behalf, allowing Cao Hong to be spared his life even though Cao Pi had previous grudges against him.

Empress Guo had no sons or recorded children. Cao Pi's eldest son Cao Rui, by Lady Zhen, was therefore considered the presumptive heir, but because of his mother's fate was not created crown prince, but only Prince of Pingyuan. (Note: He was inconsistently described as having been raised by Empress Guo or by Cao Pi's concubine Consort Li.) While she was empress, she apparently had a cordial relationship with Cao Rui. There was no evidence that she opposed his candidacy when Cao Pi, seriously ill in 226, created him crown prince. Cao Pi died soon after, and Cao Rui ascended the throne.

== As empress dowager ==
The new emperor, although he posthumously honoured his mother as an empress, honoured his stepmother as empress dowager, and he bestowed members of her family with wealth and titles. She died on 14 March 235 and was buried on 16 April 235 with honours befitting an empress alongside her husband Cao Pi. Her family remained honoured by her stepson.

How Empress Dowager Guo came to die, however, is a matter of historical controversy. The Weilüe and Han Jin Chunqiu stated that at some point during Cao Rui's reign, Consort Li told him Empress Dowager Guo's role in Lady Zhen's death – and further told him that after Lady Zhen died, it was at Empress Dowager Guo's suggestion that she was buried with her hair covering her face and her mouth filled with rice grain shells – so that even after her death she would be unable to complain. Cao Rui became enraged and confronted Empress Dowager Guo – who could not deny her involvement directly. He then forced her to commit suicide, and, while he buried her with the honours befitting an empress, he had her face covered with her hair (so that she would never see sunlight ever again), and her mouth filled with rice grain shells (so that she could never say anything in the afterlife). (Note: When recording Lady Guo's death, Zizhi Tongjian indicated that Lady Guo died in fear after Cao Rui pressed her multiple times on Lady Zhen's death.)

However, even after her death, her family continued to be favoured by Cao Rui especially her cousin Guo Biao (郭表), who was granted succession to Guo Nuwang's father's posthumous fief and promoted to a general.

== See also ==
- Cao Wei family trees#Cao Pi's other wives and children
- Lists of people of the Three Kingdoms

== Notes ==
Chinese royalty
New dynasty	Empress of Cao Wei; 222–226	Succeeded by Empress Mao
Preceded by Cao Jie of Eastern Han Dynasty	Empress of China (Northern/Central); 222–226	Succeeded by Empress Mao
