= Cao Rui =

Emperor of Cao Wei from 226 to 239

Emperor Ming of Wei 魏明帝
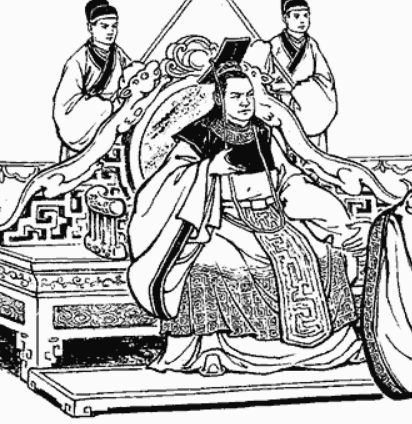
- Depiction in the 1957 lianhuanhua adaption of Romance of the Three Kingdoms

Emperor of Cao Wei
- Reign: 29 June 226 – 22 January 239
- Predecessor: Cao Pi
- Successor: Cao Fang

Crown Prince of Cao Wei
- Tenure: 28 June 226 (Note: Cao Rui's biography in the Sanguozhi indicate that he was made crown prince in the 5th month of the 7th year of the Huang'chu era. The month starts from 13 Jun 226 in the Julian calendar. The biography also indicated that he was made crown prince as Cao Pi was deathly ill; Cao Pi's biography in the same work indicate that he fell deathly ill on 28 Jun 226 (bing'chen day of the 5th month).) – 29 June 226
- Successor: Cao Fang

Prince of Pingyuan (平原王)
- Tenure: 30 March 222 – 28 June 226

Duke of Qi (齊公)
- Tenure: 221 – 30 March 222
- Born: 204 (Note: Chen Shou, the author of the Sanguozhi, stated that Cao Rui died at the age of 36 by East Asian age reckoning.) or 205 (Note: Pei Songzhi, who annotated the Sanguozhi, asserted that Cao Rui was born in Jian'an 10 (c. 205) during the reign of the Xian Emperor of Han.)
- Died: 22 January 239 (aged 34 or 35); Luoyang, Wei dynasty
- Burial: Gaoping Mausoleum (高平陵), Luoyang, Henan
- Consorts: Lady Yu; Empress Mingdao; Empress Mingyuan
- Issue: Cao Yin, Prince Ai of Anping; Cao Jiong, Prince of Qinghe; Cao Mu, Prince of Fanyang; Princess Yi of Pingyuan; Princess Qi
Names
- Family name: Cao (曹); Given name: Rui (叡); Courtesy name: Yuanzhong (元仲)
Era dates
- Taihe (太和): 227–233; Qinglong (青龍): 233–237; Jingchu (景初): 237–239
Posthumous name
- Emperor Ming (明帝)
Temple name
- Liezu (烈祖)
- House: House of Cao
- Father: Cao Pi
- Mother: Empress Wenzhao

Cao Rui
- Chinese: 曹叡
Transcriptions
Standard Mandarin
- Hanyu Pinyin: Cáo Ruì
- Gwoyeu Romatzyh: Tsaur Ruey
- Wade–Giles: Ts'ao^{2} Jui^{4}
- IPA: [tsʰǎʊ ɻwêɪ]
Yue: Cantonese
- Yale Romanization: Chòuh Yeuih
- Jyutping: Cou^{4} Jeoi^{6}
- IPA: [tsʰɔw˩ jɵɥ˨]
Southern Min
- Tâi-lô: Tsô Jūe
Middle Chinese
- Middle Chinese: Dzaw Jwèj

Cao Rui (204 or 205 – 22 January 239), courtesy name Yuanzhong, was the second emperor of the state of Cao Wei during the Three Kingdoms period. His parentage is in dispute: his mother, Lady Zhen, was Yuan Xi's wife, but she later remarried Cao Pi, the first ruler of Wei. Based on conflicting accounts of his age, Pei Songzhi calculated that, in order to be Cao Pi's son, Cao Rui could not have been 36 (by East Asian age reckoning) when he died as recorded, so the recorded age was in error; late-Qing scholars Lu Bi (卢弼) and Mao Guangsheng (冒广生) argued instead that Cao Rui was Yuan Xi's son.

Cao Rui's reign was viewed in many different ways throughout Chinese history. He devoted many resources into building palaces and ancestral temples, and his reign saw the stalemate between his empire, Shu Han, and Eastern Wu become more entrenched. His building projects and his desire to have many concubines (who numbered in the thousands) greatly exhausted the imperial treasury.

On his deathbed, he had no biological son. He passed the throne to his adopted son Cao Fang and entrusted him to the regency of Cao Shuang and Sima Yi. This would prove to be a fatal mistake for his clan, as Cao Shuang monopolised power and governed incompetently, eventually drawing a violent reaction from Sima Yi, who overthrew him in a coup d'état (Incident at the Gaoping Tombs). Sima Yi became in control of the Wei government from February 249, eventually allowing his grandson Sima Yan to usurp the throne in February 266. After his death, Cao Rui was posthumously honoured as "Emperor Ming" with the temple name "Liezu".

== Family background ==
When Cao Rui was born (likely in 205), his grandfather Cao Cao was the paramount warlord of the Han dynasty, who had rendered Emperor Xian of Han a mere figurehead. His father Cao Pi was Cao Cao's oldest surviving son and the heir apparent. His mother Lady Zhen had been the wife of Yuan Shao's son Yuan Xi, but when she was seized by Cao Cao's army in c.mid-September 204, (Note: The Zizhi Tongjian recorded that Cao Cao's army entered Ye during the night of the wuyin day of the 8th month of Jian'an 9 (13 Sep 204 in the Julian calendar); Cao Cao's biography in Sanguozhi dated the event to the same month and year, without indicating a specific day; the month corresponds to 12 Sep to 11 Oct 204 in the Julian calendar. The year ends on 6 Feb 205.) Cao Pi forced her to marry him, and she gave birth to Cao Rui only eight months after the wedding—leading to theories that Cao Rui was actually biologically Yuan Xi's son and not Cao Pi's. However, Cao Cao was fond of this grandson, and frequently ordered Rui to be at his side. Cao Cao even said, "It is because of you (Cao Rui) that my achievements can last three generations." Cao Pi, after his father's death in March 220, forced Emperor Xian to yield the throne to him and established Cao Wei in December of that year. Lady Zhen was not allowed to accompany him to the new capital Luoyang; in August 221, he forced her to commit suicide. (Note: Chen Shou wrote in Lady Guo's biography in Sanguozhi that Lady Zhen's death was due to Lady Guo becoming favored. When recording Lady Zhen's death, vol.69 of Zizhi Tongjian indicated that Lady Guo slandered her (谮之).)

Because of what happened to Lady Zhen and Cao Rui's unclear origin, even though Cao Rui was the oldest of Cao Pi's sons, he was not created crown prince early in his father's reign, but was only created the Prince of Pingyuan in March 222. Sometime during his years as the Prince of Pingyuan, he married a daughter of an aristocrat, Lady Yu, as his wife and princess. He apparently had a cordial relationship with Lady Guo, who was created empress (in October 222); as she was sonless, his status as heir apparent was not seriously challenged. It is said that any thoughts that Cao Pi had at not making him heir was dissipated by a hunt; during that hunt, Cao Pi and Cao Rui had encountered a mother deer and a young deer. Cao Pi killed the mother deer with an arrow, and then ordered Cao Rui to kill the young deer. Cao Rui wept and said, "Your imperial majesty had already killed the mother, and I do not have the heart to kill the son as well." Cao Pi dropped his bow and arrows and became mournful.

In June 226, when Cao Pi became ill, he finally created Cao Rui crown prince. He died soon thereafter, and Cao Rui became emperor at the age of 21.

== As emperor ==
Cao Rui's reign was a paradoxical one in many ways. He was clearly intelligent and capable, and yet never fulfilled his potential in his governance of the country or in his military campaigns. He showed great compassion at times, and yet was capable of great cruelty. He carried out many acts that were beneficial for the empire and yet at least as many that were hurtful. Despite his uncle Cao Zhi's successive petitions, however, he continued the severe prohibitions against princes' holding of offices that his father Cao Pi had put in place, (Note: Particularly in Cao Zhi's case, as he was the only son of Cao Cao and Lady Bian who was still alive when Cao Rui's reign began, and so Cao Rui had reasons to be suspicious of his uncle.) and this was commonly viewed by traditional historians as an eventual factor in the downfall of Cao Wei, as the Simas took power after Cao Rui's death without the imperial princes having any real ability to oppose them.

=== Treatment of officials ===
Cao Rui, a young adult when he became emperor, quickly showed a knack for finding capable officials to empower while maintaining steady control over them. His father had appointed three regents for him—his distant cousin Cao Zhen, the steady administrator Chen Qun, and the shrewd strategist Sima Yi. Once Cao Rui became emperor, however, he, while knowing the value of the advice of these senior officials, chose perhaps the best path to deal with them: honoring them and making them regional governors with full authority in the provinces they governed. By doing this, he showed that he was his own man while at the same time continued to receive the wisdom of their advice.

Throughout Cao Rui's reign, he showed great diligence in seeking out advice from multiple officials, rather than concentrating on listening to several, before making important decisions. He was generally cautious and not willing to take risks, but at the same time was, therefore, able to avoid major disasters for his empire.

=== Campaigns against Shu Han ===
One immediate threat that Cao Rui had to deal with after he became emperor were attacks from Shu Han's chancellor, Zhuge Liang. Zhuge had, after the death of Shu Han's founding emperor, Liu Bei, initially taken a passive posture militarily with regards to the Shu Han-Cao Wei border, while re-establishing an alliance with Sun Quan's Eastern Wu, in order to rest the people and the troops. In 227, he, under the theory that Shu Han was naturally a weaker state than Cao Wei and, if it had just sat and done nothing, would eventually be swallowed up by Cao Wei anyway, started a series of five northern campaigns.

During these campaigns, Cao Rui's response generally was to head to the metropolitan Chang'an—a politically important city that Wei could not afford to lose—and then commission generals to the frontlines to ward off Zhuge's attacks. This strategy had the effect of boosting the morale of the troops and shortening the communication line. Being fairly quickly updated as to the events at the frontlines, Cao Rui could also keep the central empire under his watch. Ultimately, Zhuge's campaigns were futile; after his death in 234, his plan was largely abandoned by his successors Jiang Wan and Fei Yi. However, that did not mean that there was peace on the borders with Shu Han, as nearly every year, there would be battles between the two states. However, there would be no major confrontations on the scale of Zhuge's campaigns for the rest of Cao Rui's reign.

=== Campaigns against Eastern Wu ===
During Cao Rui's reign, there were also many battles waged against the other rival empire, Eastern Wu. The very first came only two months after Cao Rui had become emperor in June 226. It was during that campaign that Cao Rui showed his acumen for judging a situation correctly—believing that by the time that reinforcements could be sent, Eastern Wu's monarch Sun Quan would have already withdrawn, and therefore sending reinforcements was pointless. Throughout his reign, he would generally take a similar stance during campaigns against Eastern Wu as he did with Shu Han—head east personally to be close to the theater of the war, while remaining some distance away from the frontlines, which also proved to be effective. He also entrusted the southeastern border to the capable Man Chong, and Man's stewardship averted many disasters.

Cao Rui's greatest military loss came in 228, when the Eastern Wu general Zhou Fang tricked Cao Rui's distant cousin and regional governor Cao Xiu into believing that he was ready to surrender his troops to Cao Wei, while instead laying a trap for Cao Xiu. Instead of realizing that it was indeed a trap, Cao Rui enthusiastically approved Cao Xiu's plan, and this led to a major military disaster, but Cao Xiu's forces were saved by Jia Kui from total annihilation.

Another serious crisis posed by Eastern Wu occurred in 234, when Eastern Wu, in a semi-coordinated effort with Shu Han, launched an attack against Cao Wei simultaneously with Zhuge Liang's Northern Expeditions. At the time, many frontline officials were on vacation visiting families, so Man Chong requested Cao Rui to call them back to fight Sun Quan. Cao Rui refused to cancel his subordinates' vacation, and ordered Man to focus on the defense. Cao Rui then personally led the royal army as reinforcement, and acted as an effective coordinator of the various forces that Cao Wei had on Eastern Wu's borders, and Eastern Wu was unable to make substantial gains.

=== Campaigns against Liaodong ===
The only real military gain for Cao Wei during Cao Rui's reign was the end of the Gongsun clan's hold on Liaodong (modern central and eastern Liaoning), which was started by Gongsun Du in 190. In 228, Gongsun Du's grandson Gongsun Yuan deposed his uncle Gongsun Gong in a coup and asked for an official commission from Cao Rui. Acting against Liu Ye (劉曄)'s advice to attack the Gongsuns while there was dissension within, Cao Rui instead gave Gongsun Yuan an official commission as governor of Liaodong Commandery.

In 232, (Note: Vol.72 of Zizhi Tongjian recorded that the horse-buying fleet set out for Liaodong in the 3rd month of the 6th year of the Taihe era; the month corresponds to 8 Apr to 7 May 232 in the Julian calendar.) Gongsun Yuan's repeated communicated with and sales of horses to Eastern Wu angered Cao Rui, who ordered his generals Tian Yu and Wang Xiong (王雄) to attack Liaodong against Jiang Ji (蔣濟)'s advice; the attacks were not successful, although Tian was able to intercept the Eastern Wu horse-buying fleet and destroy it. (Note: Vol.72 of Zizhi Tongjian recorded that Tian destroyed the horse-buying fleet in the 9th or 10th month of that year; the two months correspond to 2 Oct to 29 Nov 232 in the Julian calendar. The account in Tongjian reflected the discrepancy in records found in the Sanguozhi on when Tian Yu attacked Zhou He and co. Cao Rui's biography dated the attack to the 10th month of the 6th year of the Taihe era. However, in Sun Quan's biography, the attack was dated to the 9th month of the 1st year of the Jiahe era.) After the incident, although Gongsun formally maintained vassalage to Cao Wei, the relationship was damaged.

The next year saw that relationship would be somewhat improved. Gongsun, apprehensive of another attack from Cao Wei, sent ambassadors to Eastern Wu to formally submit to its emperor Sun Quan. Sun was so pleased that he immediately created Gongsun the Prince of Yan and granted him the nine bestowments, which were typically reserved for officials so powerful that the bestowments were typically viewed as a sign that the emperor was about to abdicate to them. (Note: Vol.72 of Zizhi Tongjian recorded that the Wu envoys set out for Liaodong in the 3rd month of the 1st year of the Qinglong era; the month corresponds to 29 Mar to 26 Apr 233 in the Julian calendar.) However, Gongsun realized later that Eastern Wu would be of little help in an expedition against him. He then betrayed Eastern Wu, slaughtered Sun's ambassadors as they arrived in Liaodong, and seized their troops and escorted treasure. In response, Cao Rui created Gongsun the Duke of Lelang in c.February 234. (Note: Vol.72 of Zizhi Tongjian recorded that Gongsun Yuan was appointed da sima and Duke of Lelang in the 12th month of the 1st year of the Qinglong era; the month corresponds to 18 Jan to 15 Feb 234 in the Julian calendar.) (Note: Part of the Eastern Wu troops were able to escape and eventually returned home with the assistance of Goguryeo, a rival of the Gongsuns.)

In 237, Cao Rui once again considered attacking Liaodong, angered by reports that Gongsun had repeatedly defamed him. He commissioned Guanqiu Jian to prepare for an attack, and then ordered Gongsun to come to Luoyang for an official visit. Gongsun refused and instead declared independence. Guanqiu attacked him, but was stopped by torrential rains. Gongsun then declared himself the Prince of Yan and entered into alliances with the Xianbei tribes to harass Cao Wei's borders.

The following year, Cao Rui sent Sima Yi with 40,000 men to attack Liaodong. Upon hearing this, Gongsun again requested aid from Eastern Wu. Sun, angry at Gongsun's previous betrayal, pretended to agree, but did not send Gongsun any actual help. Although Sima's expeditionary force was also initially halted by torrential rains as Guanqiu's was, Sima waited out the rains and eventually surrounded Gongsun's capital of Xiangping (襄平, in modern Liaoyang, Liaoning), starving Gongsun's troops. After nearly three months of siege, Xiangping fell, and Gongsun fled, but was captured and executed by Sima. Liaodong became part of Cao Wei's domain.

=== Building projects and collection of concubines ===
Almost immediately after Cao Rui ascended the throne, he started out large scale palace and temple-building projects. Part of it was to be expected—the Luoyang palaces had been remnants of the ones not destroyed by Dong Zhuo, and the temples were needed for the cults of his ancestors. However, he went beyond the minimally required, and continued to build temples and palaces throughout the rest of his reign, severely draining the imperial treasury. While he occasionally halted projects at the officials' behest, the projects would restart after brief breaks. He not only built palaces in Luoyang, but also built a palace in Xuchang. In 237, he further moved many of the magnificent statues and monuments that were commissioned by Emperor Wu of Han from Chang'an to Luoyang, costing great expenses and lives. He further built gigantic bronze statues of his own and placed them on a man-made hill inside his palace, surrounded by rare trees and plants and populated by rare animals.

Cao Rui was also increasing his collection of women, as his concubines and ladies in waiting numbered thousands. His palace-building projects might have been with intent to house them. The contemporary historian Yu Huan recorded that in 237, Cao Rui even ordered that beautiful married women all be formally seized unless their husbands were able to ransom them, and that they would be married to soldiers instead—but that the most beautiful among them would become his concubines. Despite some officials' (including Zhang Mao's) protestations, this decree was apparently carried out, much to the distress of his people.

=== Marriages, succession issues and death ===
When Cao Rui became emperor, it was commonly expected that his wife, Princess Yu, would be created empress, but she was not. Rather, he created a favorite concubine, Consort Mao, empress in late 227. Princess Yu was exiled back to their original palace. He loved Empress Mao dearly, and a number of her relatives, including her father and brother, became honored officials (but without actual powers).

Despite his collection of women, however, Cao Rui was without any son who survived infancy. He adopted two sons to be his own—Cao Fang and Cao Xun, whom he created princes on 23 September 235. (Note: It is usually accepted that they were sons of his cousins, although the exact parentage is not clear.) In June or July 237, Cao Rui took the unprecedented (and unrepeated in Chinese history) action of setting his own temple name of Liezu, while setting the temple names of Cao Cao and Cao Pi. He also ordered that the temples of Cao Cao, Cao Pi and himself were not to be torn down in the future. (Note: Based on Confucian regulations, except for the founder of the dynasty, rulers' temples would be destroyed after six generations.) He carried out these actions apparently in apprehension that he would be given an unflattering temple name (or none at all) and that his temple would eventually be destroyed, due to his lack of biological issue and unclear origin.

By 237, Cao Rui's favorite was no longer Empress Mao, but Consort Guo. In September that year, when Cao Rui was attending a feast hosted by Consort Guo, Consort Guo requested that Empress Mao be invited to join as well, but Cao Rui refused and further ordered that no news about the feast is to be given to Empress Mao. However, the news leaked, and Empress Mao talked about the feast with him anyway. He became exceedingly angry, and killed a number of his attendants whom he suspected of leaking the news to Empress Mao, and, inexplicably, ordered Empress Mao to commit suicide, even though she was still buried with honors due an empress, and her family remained honored.

On 31 December 238, Cao Rui grew ill. He created Consort Guo empress on 16 January 239 in preparation of allowing her to become empress dowager after his death. He initially wanted to entrust his adopted son, Cao Fang the Prince of Qi, to his uncle Cao Yu, to serve as the lead regent, along with Xiahou Xian (夏侯獻), Cao Shuang, Cao Zhao (曹肇; son of Cao Xiu), and Qin Lang (秦朗). However, his trusted officials Liu Fang (劉放) and Sun Zi (孫資) were unfriendly with Xiahou and Cao Zhao and were apprehensive about their becoming regents, and managed to persuade him to make Cao Shuang (with whom they were friendly) and Sima Yi regents instead. Cao Yu, Cao Zhao, and Qin were excluded from the regency. On 22 January 239, Cao Rui created the seven-year-old Cao Fang crown prince, and died that same day. Cao Fang succeeded him as emperor. On 17 February, Cao Rui was buried at Gaoping Tombs.

=== Oddities regarding traditions and customs ===
Even before his setting of his own temple name, Cao Rui was recorded to be involved in odd behaviour in events regarding the traditions and customs of his day.

After he became emperor, Cao Rui once attempted to tug at Empress Dowager Guo's clothing as he begged her to play some music; Lady Guo was well-known for her playing of the pipa. At the time, Yang Fu was by his side; he then asked the emperor, "The Empress Dowager is Your Majesty's dimu; (Note: used to denote the main wife of one's father in the traditional Chinese marriage system.) where is your decorum?" Ashamed, Cao Rui withdrew his hand. After Lady Guo left, the emperor said to Yang, "I know you emphasize greatly on proper behavior. But I am indeed feeling troubled. Now that I have listened to you, isn't it like standing beside the flowing waters of the Xiang River and being unable to see that person (Note: referring to Lady Guo's pipa playing.)?"

On 3 August 229, Cao Teng was posthumously honoured as "Emperor Gao of Wei" (魏高帝), becoming the only eunuch in Chinese officialdom to have this honor.

When Cao Rui's daughter Cao Shu (曹淑) died in infancy (less than one month old) on 15 February 232, (Note: Cao Shu's name was recorded as Tai in Tang Kaiyuan Zhanjing.) Cao Rui insisted on taking part in the funeral procession. Yang Fu noted that he did not do so during the funerals of Cao Pi and Empress Dowager Bian, and advised him not to join in the funeral procession. Cao Rui ignored Yang's advice. Cao Rui also insisted that the funeral rites used be those for an adult woman and that court officials were to don mourning clothing; Chen Qun wrote a formal submission to advise the emperor. Cao Rui ignored the advice. Afterwards, besides bestowing upon Cao Shu the posthumous title of "Princess Yi of Pingyuan", Cao Rui ordered that a temple be raised for her. A deceased grandson of his mother Lady Zhen's brother, Zhen Huang (甄黄), was also buried with Cao Shu and was posthumously made a marquis. A male relative of Empress Mingyuan, Guo De (郭德), was declared to be the deceased couple's child; his surname was changed to "Zhen" and he was made Marquis of Pingyuan, inheriting the princess's title. (Note: Sun Sheng criticized Cao Rui's behaviour regarding the erection of the temple and improper bestowing of titles to Guo De. While he noted Chen Qun's and Yang Fu's dissenting advice, he argued that they should have gone further in stopping the emperor.)

=== Changes to the calendar during the Jing'chu era ===
In c.February 237, after receiving reports of auspicious signs, Cao Rui agreed to make changes to the calendar, such that the jian'chou month (the 12th month) became the new zheng month (and thus the start of a new year). This calendar change took effect after 11 April 237 in the Julian calendar, along with the change in era name from Qing'long to Jing'chu.

After Cao Rui's death, his successor Cao Fang reverted the changes, and the jian'yin month (the 1st month) once again became the zheng month, and thus the start of a new year.

== Era names ==
- Taihe (太和) 227–233
- Qinglong (青龍) 233–237
- Jingchu (景初) 12 Feb 237 – 9 Feb 240

== Family ==
- Princess Consort of Pingyuan, of the Yu clan (平原王妃 虞氏)
- Empress Mingdao, of the Mao clan (明悼皇后 毛氏; d. 237)
  - Cao Yin, Prince Ai of Anping (安平哀王 曹殷; 231–232)
- Empress Mingyuan, of the Guo clan (明元皇后 郭氏; d. 264)
  - Princess Yi of Pingyuan (平原懿公主; 232), personal name Shu (淑)
- Unknown
  - Cao Jiong, Prince of Qinghe (清河王 曹冏; d. 226)
  - Cao Mu, Prince of Fanyang (繁陽王 曹穆; d. 229)
  - Princess Qi (齊公主)
    - Married Li Tao (李韜; d. 254), a son of Li Feng, and had issue (three sons)
    - Married Ren Kai (任愷; 223–284)

== See also ==
- Cao Wei family trees
- Lists of people of the Three Kingdoms
- List of Chinese monarchs

== Notes ==
Emperor Ming of Cao Wei House of Cao Born: 205 Died: 239
Regnal titles
Preceded by Cao Pi	Emperor of Cao Wei; 226–239	Succeeded by Cao Fang
Titles in pretence
Preceded by Cao Pi	— TITULAR — Emperor of China; 226–239; Reason for succession failure: Three Kingdoms	Succeeded by Cao Fang
