= Cao Pi =

Emperor of Cao Wei of China (220 - 226)

Emperor Wen of Wei 魏文帝
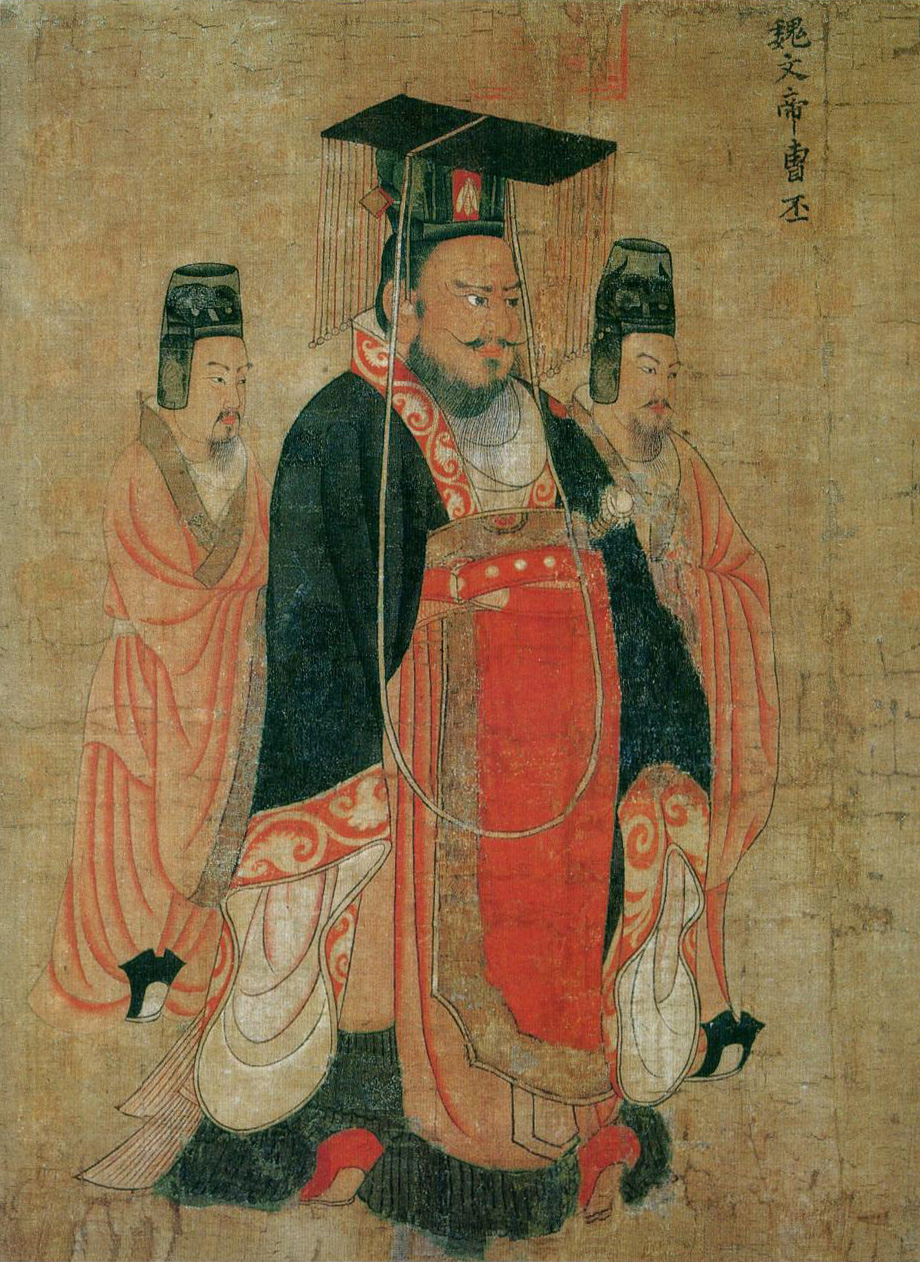
- A Tang dynasty painting by Yan Liben of Cao Pi flanked by two ministers

Emperor of Wei
- Reign: 11 December 220 (Note: The Zizhi Tongjian recorded that while Emperor Xian abdicated on the yimao day of the 10th month of the 1st year of the Yankang era of Emperor Xian's reign, Cao Pi only ascended the throne on the xinwei day of the same month (16 days later), which corresponds to 11 Dec 220 on the Julian calendar.) (Note: In his Zizhi Tongjian Kaoyi, Sima Guang noted that Cao Pi's biography in Records of the Three Kingdoms recorded that Emperor Xian abdicated on the bingwu day (16 Nov 220 in the Julian calendar), while Cao Pi ascended the throne on the gengwu day (10 Dec 220). Yuan Hong's Annals of the Later Han also recorded that Cao Pi ascended the throne on the gengwu day. The Xiandi Ji recorded that Emperor Xian abdicated on the yimao day, while Cao Pi ascended the throne on the 29th day of that month (which was the xinwei day). A stele recording the events surrounding the abdication/accession survived till Sima Guang's time; said stele recorded that Emperor Xian abdicated on the xinwei day. Thus, Sima concluded that the records found in Records and Annals were erroneous.) – 29 June 226
- Successor: Cao Rui

King of Wei (魏王) (under the Han Empire)
- Tenure: 15 March 220 – 11 December 220
- Predecessor: Cao Cao

Imperial Chancellor (丞相) (under the Han Empire)
- Tenure: 15 March 220 – 11 December 220
- Predecessor: Cao Cao
- Born: c. late 187; Qiao County, Pei State, Han Empire
- Died: June 29, 226 (aged 38–39); Luoyang, Wei Empire
- Burial: Shouyang Mausoleum (首陽陵), Yanshi, Henan
- Consorts: Empress Wenzhao; Empress Wende; Lady Li; Lady Pan; Lady Zhu; Lady Qiu; Lady Ren; Lady Liu (elder); Lady Liu (younger); Consort Xu; Consort Su; Consort Zhang; Consort Song; Consort Yin; Consort Chai
- Issue: Cao Rui; Cao Xie; Cao Rui; Cao Jian; Cao Lin; Cao Li; Cao Yong; Cao Gong; Cao Yan; Princess Dongxiang
Names
- Family name: Cao (曹); Given name: Pi (丕); Courtesy name: Zihuan (子桓)
Era name and dates
- Huangchu (黄初): 220–226
Posthumous name
- Emperor Wen (文帝)
Temple name
- Gaozu (高祖)
- Dynasty: Cao Wei
- Father: Cao Cao
- Mother: Empress Wuxuan

Cao Pi
- "Cao Pi" in Chinese characters
- Chinese: 曹丕
Transcriptions
Standard Mandarin
- Hanyu Pinyin: Cáo Pī
- Gwoyeu Romatzyh: Tsaur Pi
- Wade–Giles: Ts'ao^{2} P'i^{1}
- IPA: [tsʰǎʊ pʰí]
Yue: Cantonese
- Yale Romanization: Tsòuh Pēi
- Jyutping: Cou^{4} Pei^{1}
- IPA: [tsʰɔw˩ pʰej˥]
Southern Min
- Tâi-lô: Tsô Phi
Middle Chinese
- Middle Chinese: Dzaw Pʰi

Cao Pi (c.late 187 – 29 June 226), courtesy name Zihuan, was the first emperor of the state of Cao Wei in the Three Kingdoms period of China. He was the second son of Cao Cao, a warlord who lived in the late Eastern Han dynasty, but the eldest son among all the children born to Cao Cao by his concubine (later wife), Lady Bian. According to some historical records, he was often in the presence of court officials in order to gain their support. He was mostly in charge of defence at the start of his career. After the defeat of Cao Cao's rival Yuan Shao at the Battle of Guandu, he took Yuan Xi's wife, Lady Zhen, as a concubine, but in 221 Lady Zhen died and Guo Nüwang became empress.

On 25 November 220, Cao Pi forced Emperor Xian, the last ruler of the Eastern Han dynasty, to abdicate in his favour, after which on 11 December 220 he proclaimed himself emperor and established the state of Cao Wei. Cao Pi continued the wars against the states of Shu Han and Eastern Wu, founded by his father's rivals Liu Bei and Sun Quan, respectively, but did not make significant territorial gain in the battles. Unlike his father, Cao Pi concentrated most of his efforts on internal administration rather than on waging wars against his rivals. During his reign, he formally established Chen Qun's nine-rank system as the base for civil service nomination, which drew many talents into his government. On the other hand, he drastically reduced the power of princes, stripping off their power to oppose him, but at the same time, rendering them unable to assist the emperor if a crisis arose within the state. After Cao Pi's death, his successor Cao Rui granted him the posthumous name "Emperor Wen" and the temple name "Gaozu".

Cao Pi was also an accomplished poet and scholar, just like his father Cao Cao and his younger brother Cao Zhi. He wrote Yan Ge Xing (燕歌行), the first Chinese poem in the style of seven syllables per line (七言詩). He also wrote over a hundred articles on various subjects. The zhiguai collection Lieyi Zhuan was also attributed to him. (Note: The Book of Sui recorded that Lieyi Zhuan was written by Cao Pi. However, the collection recorded events which supposedly occurred during the Zhengshi and Ganlu eras (of Cao Fang's and Cao Mao's reigns respectively). Both Books of Tang recorded that the author was Zhang Hua instead. Qing-era scholar Yao Zhenzong (姚振宗) theorized that the collection was started by Cao Pi and then later continued/completed by Zhang Hua, but offered no evidence to support his claim.)

== Early life and career ==
Cao Pi was the eldest son of Cao Cao and his concubine Lady Bian, but he was the second among all of Cao Cao's sons, the eldest being Cao Ang. At the time of Cao Pi's birth, Cao Cao was a mid-level officer in the imperial guards in the capital Luoyang, with no hint that he would go on to the great campaigns he eventually carried out after the collapse of the imperial government in 190. Cao Pi was recorded as excellent swordsman as he studied martial arts from Shi E, a gentleman of the household from the "Rapid as Tigers" (虎賁) division of the imperial guards. In the period after 190 when Cao Cao was constantly waging war against other rival warlords, it is not known where Cao Pi and Lady Bian were, or what they did. The lone reference to Cao Pi during this period was in 204. After Cao Cao defeated Yuan Shang then conquered the city of Ye and massacred his population. The women of the Yuan household were often raped while Cao Pi took Yuan Xi's wife (Note: Yuan Xi would only die in c.December 207.) Lady Zhen as his wife.

== Succession struggle with Cao Zhi ==
The next immediate reference to Cao Pi's activities was in 211, when he was appointed General of the Household for All Purposes (五官中郎將) and Vice Imperial Chancellor (副丞相). This position placed him second to his father, who was then Imperial Chancellor (丞相) and the de facto head of government in China. The eldest of all of Cao Cao's sons, Cao Ang, had died early, so Cao Pi was regarded as the eldest among all his father's sons. Besides, Cao Pi's mother had also become Cao Cao's official spouse after Cao Cao's first wife Lady Ding was deposed. Cao Pi thus became the presumptive heir to his father.

However, Cao Pi's status as heir was not immediately made legal, and for years there were lingering doubts on whom Cao Cao intended to make heir. Cao Cao greatly favoured Cao Zhi (his third son with Lady Bian), who was known for his literary talents. Both Cao Pi and Cao Zhi were talented poets, but Cao Zhi was more highly regarded as a poet and speaker. By 215, the brothers appeared to be in harmony with each other, but each had his own group of supporters and close associates engaging the other side in clandestine rivalry. Initially, Cao Zhi's party appeared to be prevailing, and in 216 they were successful in falsely accusing two officials supporting Cao Pi—Cui Yan and Mao Jie. Cui Yan was executed, while Mao Jie was deposed. However, the situation shifted after Cao Cao received advice from his strategist Jia Xu, who concluded that changing the general rules of succession (primogeniture) would be disruptive—using Yuan Shao and Liu Biao as negative examples. Cao Pi was also fostering his image among the people and created the sense that Cao Zhi was wasteful and lacking actual talent in governance. In November or December 217, Cao Cao, who had received the title of a vassal king—King of Wei (魏王)—from Emperor Xian (whom he still paid nominal allegiance to), finally declared Cao Pi as his heir apparent (世子). Cao Pi would remain as such until his father's death in March 220.

== As King of Wei ==
Cao Cao died in the spring of 220 in Luoyang. Even though Cao Pi had been his father's heir apparent for several years, there was initially some confusion as to what would happen next. The apprehension was particularly heightened when, after Cao Cao's death, the Qingzhou Corps under the general Zang Ba suddenly deserted, leaving Luoyang and returning home. Besides, Cao Pi's younger brother Cao Zhang (also born to Lady Bian) had arrived in Luoyang in a hurry, resulting in rumours that he was intending to seize power from his elder brother. Upon hearing these news at Cao Cao's headquarters at Ye, Cao Pi hastily declared himself the new King of Wei and issued an edict in the name of his mother Queen Dowager Bian, before receiving an official confirmation from Emperor Xian, to whom he still nominally paid allegiance. After Cao Pi's self-declaration, neither Cao Zhang nor any other individual took action against him. Cao Pi then ordered his brothers, including Cao Zhang and Cao Zhi, to return to their respective fiefs. With the help of Jiang Ji, the political situation soon stabilised.

== As emperor of Cao Wei ==
=== Succeeding Emperor Xian ===
In the winter of 220, Cao Pi made his move for the imperial throne, strongly suggesting to Emperor Xian that he should yield the throne. Emperor Xian did so, and Cao Pi formally declined three times (a model that would be followed by future usurpers in Chinese history), and then finally accepted on 25 November of that year, establishing the state of Cao Wei. This event marked the official end of the Han dynasty and the beginning of the Three Kingdoms period. The dethroned Emperor Xian was granted the title "Duke of Shanyang" (山陽公). Cao Pi granted posthumous titles of emperors to his grandfather Cao Song and his father Cao Cao, while his mother Queen Dowager Bian became empress dowager. He also moved the imperial capital from Xuchang to Luoyang.

=== Military failures against Sun Quan ===
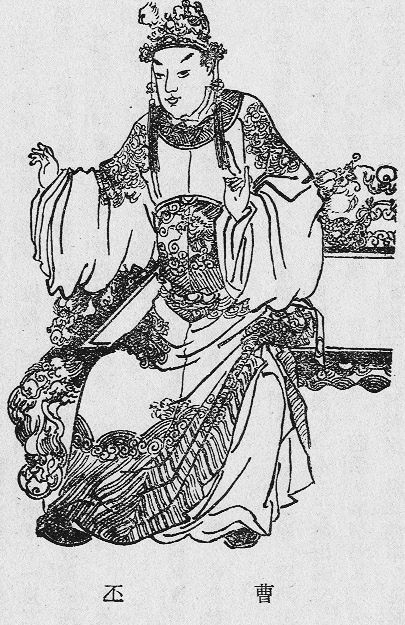
A block print of Cao Pi wearing anachronistic clothing

After news of Cao Pi's ascension (and an accompanying false rumour that Cao Pi had executed Emperor Xian) arrived in Liu Bei's domain of Yi Province (covering present-day Sichuan and Chongqing), Liu Bei also declared himself emperor in May 221, establishing the state of Shu Han. Sun Quan, who controlled the vast majority of southeastern and southern China, did not take any affirmative steps one way or another, leaving his options open.

An armed conflict between Liu Bei and Sun Quan quickly materialised, because in late 219 Sun Quan had sent his general Lü Meng to invade Jing Province and seize the territories from Liu Bei, which resulted in the death of Liu's general Guan Yu. To avoid having to fight on two fronts, Sun Quan formally paid allegiance to Cao Pi, expressing his willingness to become a vassal under Wei. Cao Pi's strategist Liu Ye suggested rejecting this offer and instead attacking Sun Quan on a second front. This would effectively partition Sun Quan's domain with Shu, and would eventually allow Cao Pi to destroy Shu as well. Cao Pi declined this suggestion, in a fateful choice that most historians believe doomed his empire to ruling only northern and central China; such an opportunity would not come again. Indeed, against Liu Ye's advice, Cao Pi granted Sun Quan the title "King of Wu" (吳王) and the nine bestowments.

Sun Quan's submission did not last long. After Sun Quan's forces, under the command of Lu Xun, defeated Shu forces at the Battle of Xiaoting in 222, Sun Quan began to distance himself from Wei. When Cao Pi demanded that Sun Quan send his heir apparent, Sun Deng, to Luoyang as a hostage, Sun Quan refused and formally broke ties with Wei. Cao Pi personally led an expedition against Sun Quan, and in response, Sun Quan declared independence from Wei, establishing the state of Eastern Wu. (Note: However, Sun continued ruling as "King of Wu" and did not declare himself emperor until 229.) By this time, having defeated Shu, the Wu forces enjoyed high morale and effective leadership from Sun Quan, Lu Xun and a number of other capable generals. Cao Pi's forces were not able to make significant advances against them despite several large-scale attacks in the next few years. The division of the former Han Empire into three states has become firmly established, particularly after Liu Bei's death in 223. The Shu chancellor Zhuge Liang, serving as regent for Liu Bei's son and successor Liu Shan, re-established the alliance with Wu, resulting in Wei having to defend itself on two fronts and unable to conquer either. Exasperated, Cao Pi made a famous comment in 225 that "Heaven created the Yangtze River to divide the north and the south."

=== Domestic matters ===
Cao Pi was generally viewed as a competent, but unspectacular, administrator of his empire. He commissioned a number of capable officials to be in charge of various affairs of the empire, employing his father's general guidelines of valuing abilities over heritage. However, he was not open to criticism, and officials who dared to criticise him were often demoted and, on rare occasions, put to death.

==== Treatment of princes ====
Since Cao Pi was still fearful and resentful of Cao Zhi, he soon had the latter's fief reduced in size and had a number of his associates executed. Ding Yi, who was chief among Cao Zhi's strategists, had his whole clan exterminated as a result of assisting the latter in the past. In summary, under regulations established by Cao Pi, not only were the Wei princes (unlike princes of the Han dynasty) distanced from central politics, they also had minimal authority even in their own principalities and were restricted in many ways, particularly in the use of military force.

==== Treatment of officials ====
Cao Pi was recorded to frequently ridicule his subordinates. For example, Yu Jin was captured by Liu Bei's general Guan Yu at the Battle of Fancheng in 219, and was later taken back to Wu and detained there after the Wu invasion of Jing Province. Yu Jin was allowed to return to Wei after Wu briefly became a vassal state under Wei in 221. Cao Pi reinstated Yu Jin as General Who Pacifies the Borders (安遠將軍) and announced that he would send Yu Jin back to Eastern Wu—where he had been imprisoned—as an envoy. However, before Yu Jin's departure, he was instructed to travel to Ye to pay his respects at Cao Cao's tomb. When Yu Jin arrived, he found that the emperor had commissioned artists to paint, in his father's tomb, scenes of the Battle of Fancheng. These scenes showed Yu Jin begging for his life to be spared and succumbing to the victorious Guan Yu, while his subordinate Pang De was shown dying an honourable death by resisting the invading forces to his last breath. Upon seeing the vivid mural, Yu Jin was so filled with regret and shame that he fell ill and soon died. Cao Pi further gave the deceased Yu Jin a negative-sounding posthumous title, "Marquis Li" (厲侯), for people to remember the latter as the "stony marquis (or vicious marquis)". Wang Zhong, a general who followed Cao Cao for many years, was also a subject of ridicule by Cao Pi.

=== Succession issues and death ===
An immediate issue after Cao Pi became emperor in 220 was who the empress would be. Lady Zhen was his wife. Cao Pi summoned Lady Zhen to Luoyang, but Lady Zhen refused because of her poor health. In August 221, Lady Zhen died and the position of empress went to Guo Nüwang. (Note: This account was found in Wei Shu (Book of Wei) and was not included in the original Sanguozhi. Pei Songzhi added this annotation to Lady Zhen's biography in Sanguozhi and went on to speculate that there were hidden reasons as to why Cao Pi did not make Lady Zhen his empress and killed her later on. Pei also wrote of his skepticism of the truthfulness of the anecdotes between Ladies Bian and Zhen, and approved of Chen Shou not including them when he compiled the original Sanguozhi.)

Guo Nüwang did not bear Cao Pi any children. Cao Rui was the eldest of Cao Pi's sons, but because of his mother's death, he was not instated as the crown prince. Instead, Cao Rui was appointed "Prince of Pingyuan" after his father's ascension to the throne. Cao Pi did not appear to have seriously considered any other son as heir. (Note: It might have been because the other sons were all significantly younger, although their ages were not recorded in history.) In the summer of 226, when Cao Pi was seriously ill, he finally named Cao Rui as his crown prince. On his deathbed, he entrusted Cao Rui to the care of Cao Zhen, Chen Qun and Sima Yi. Following his father's death, Cao Rui ascended the throne at the age of 21.

== Family ==
- Empress Wenzhao, of the Zhen clan (文昭皇后 甄氏; 183–221)
  - Cao Rui, Emperor Ming (明皇帝 曹叡; 204–239), 1st son
  - Princess Dongxiang (東鄉公主), 1st daughter
- Empress Wende, of the Guo clan (文德皇后 郭氏; 184–235)
- Furen, of the Ren clan (夫人任氏)
- Guiren, of the Li clan (貴人 李氏)
  - Cao Xie, Prince Ai of Zan (贊哀王 曹協, d. 235)
- Shuyuan, of the Pan clan (淑媛 潘氏)
  - Cao Rui, Prince Wen'an (文安王 曹蕤; d. 233), 3rd son
- Shuyuan, of the Zhu clan (淑媛 朱氏)
  - Cao Jian, Prince Huai of Dongwuyang (東武陽懷王 曹鑑; d. 225/226)
- Zhaoyi, of the Qiu clan (昭儀 仇氏)
  - Cao Lin, Prince Ding of Donghai (東海定王 曹霖; d. 251)
- Lady, of the Xu clan (徐氏)
  - Cao Li, Prince Liang (梁王 曹禮; 208–229)
- Lady, of the Su clan (蘇氏)
  - Cao Yong, Prince Luyang (魯陽王 曹邕; died 229)
- Lady, of the Zhang clan (張氏)
  - Cao Gong, Prince Dao of Qinghe (清河悼王 曹貢; d. 223)
- Lady, of the Song clan (宋氏)
  - Cao Yan, Prince Ai of Guangping (廣平哀王 曹儼; d. 223)
- Lady, of the Xue clan (薛氏), personal name Lingyuan (灵芸)
- Lady, of the Chen clan (陈氏), personal name Shangyi (尚衣)
- Lady, of the Li clan (李氏)
- Lady, of the Duan clan (段氏), personal name Qiaoxiao (巧笑)
- Lady, of the Li clan (李氏)
- Unknown
  - Cao Jie (曹喈), 2nd son

== Ancestry ==
Cao Song (d. 193)
Cao Cao (155–220)
Lady Ding
Cao Pi (187–226)
Bian Guang
Bian Yuan
Lady Zhou
Empress Wuxuan (161–230)

== In popular culture ==
How Cao Pi became an emperor is portrayed in "Secret of the Three Kingdoms".

Cao Pi appears as a playable character in Koei's Dynasty Warriors and Warriors Orochi video game series. He also appears in Koei's Romance of the Three Kingdoms series.

Yu Bin portrayed Cao Pi in the 2010 Chinese television series Three Kingdoms.

== See also ==
- Cao Wei family trees
- Lists of people of the Three Kingdoms

== Notes ==
Emperor Wen of Cao Wei House of Cao Born: 187 Died: 29 June 226
Regnal titles
Preceded by Himself as King of Wei	Emperor of Cao Wei; 220–226	Succeeded by Cao Rui
Chinese royalty
Preceded by Cao Cao	King of Wei; 220	Himself as Emperor of Wei
Titles in pretence
Preceded by Emperor Xian of Han	— TITULAR — Emperor of China; 220–226; Reason for succession failure: Three Kingdoms	Succeeded by Cao Rui
