= Empress Dowager Bian =

Cao Wei Empress Dowager (died 230)

Lady Bian 卞氏

Grand empress dowager of Cao Wei
- Tenure: 29 June 226 – 9 July 230

Empress dowager of Cao Wei
- Tenure: 13 December 220 – 29 June 226
- Successor: Empress Wende
- Born: 30 December 159 or 29 January 161 (Note: According to the Book of Wei by Wang Chen et al., Lady Bian was born on the jisi day of the 12th month of the 3rd year of the Yan'xi era of the reign of Emperor Huan of Han. However, this is likely to be an error as there is no jisi day in the 12th month of that year. There is a yisi (乙巳) day in that month, and the date corresponds to 29 Jan 161 in the Julian calendar. The Taiping Yulan also cited the Book of Wei by Wang Chen et al., but gave the date as the yisi day of the 12th month of the 2nd year of the Yan'xi era, which also has no corresponding date in the Julian calendar; the jisi day of that month corresponds to 30 Dec 159. Vol.138 of Yulan, again citing the same Book of Wei, recorded that Lady Bian was born in the 3rd year of the Yan'xi era.); Linyi, Shandong, Eastern Han dynasty
- Died: 9 July 230 (aged 69 or 70) (Note: Cao Rui's biography in the Sanguozhi recorded that Lady Bian died on the wuzi day of the 6th month of the 4th year of the Taihe era of Cao Rui's reign. This date corresponds to 9 July 230 in the Gregorian calendar. However, Empress Dowager Bian's own biography in the Sanguozhi gives a slightly different and less precise "5th month of the 4th year of the Taihe era" as her time of death, corresponding to 30 May to 28 June 230 in the Julian calendar.); Luoyang, Henan, Cao Wei
- Burial: Cao Cao Mausoleum
- Spouse: Cao Cao
- Issue: Cao Pi; Cao Zhang; Cao Zhi; Cao Xiong
Posthumous name
- Empress Wuxuan (武宣皇后)
- Father: Bian Yuan

Lady Bian (30 December 159 or 29 January 161 – 9 July 230), also known as Empress Dowager Bian or Grand Empress Dowager Bian, formally known as Empress Wuxuan, was an empress dowager and later grand empress dowager of the state of Cao Wei during the Three Kingdoms period of China. She was the wife of Cao Cao, a warlord who rose to power in the late Eastern Han dynasty and laid the foundation of Wei. She bore Cao Cao's successor, Cao Pi, who ended the Han dynasty and founded Wei in 220 after his father's death.

== Family background and marriage to Cao Cao ==
Lady Bian was born in 159 or 161 in Bai Village (白亭), Qi Commandery (in present-day Shandong) although her family was registered in Langya Commandery (in present-day southeastern Shandong). Because her family was poor, she was a courtesan when she was young. When she was 20, Cao Cao took her as a concubine. In 189, when Cao Cao fled from Dong Zhuo at Luoyang, Yuan Shu spread rumours that Cao Cao had died. Lady Bian refused to believe them and persuaded Cao Cao's followers not to desert him. When Cao Cao returned, he was impressed at her conduct. She birthed him four sons – Cao Pi, Cao Zhang, Cao Zhi and Cao Xiong. After the death of Cao Cao's eldest son Cao Ang, Cao Cao's wife Lady Ding (who was not Cao Ang's biological mother but adopted him as her own) left him, never coming back even after he asked for forgiveness many times. He then made Lady Bian his principal wife. However, Lady Bian still treated Lady Ding kindly after her elevation of status. In c.August 219 (after Cao Cao had been made the King of Wei in 216), Emperor Xian of Han made her the Queen of Wei. She was known for her piety, wisdom and humility. She was particularly praised for refusing to celebrate lavishly (as her attendants had suggested) when her son Cao Pi was made heir in 217.

== As empress dowager ==
After Cao Cao died in March 220, Cao Pi inherited his title as the King of Wei, and later that year forced Emperor Xian to abdicate in his favour, ending the Han dynasty and establishing the state of Cao Wei. Queen Dowager Bian became empress dowager. She was not much involved in her son's administration or in his campaigns against Cao Wei's rival states, Eastern Wu and Shu Han. She, in particular, refused to grant her family excessive wealth or titles, setting an example for the rest of Cao Wei's history. One incident that she did engage herself in happened in 226, (Note: Cao Hong's tribulation was listed under this year in Zizhi Tongjian (vol.70). His biography in Sanguozhi did not indicate when this event took place.) when Cao Pi wanted to execute Cao Cao's cousin Cao Hong due to previous grudges between them. She, remembering the contributions that Cao Hong had made – including one occasion when he personally had saved Cao Cao's life – rebuked Cao Pi sufficiently that he spared Cao Hong's life, although Cao Hong's offices and titles were still stripped from him.

== As grand empress dowager ==
After Cao Pi died in June 226, his son Cao Rui became emperor, and he honoured his grandmother as grand empress dowager. In 227, she was inadvertently insulted by her granddaughter-in-law Lady Yu – Princess Yu had been Cao Rui's wife when he was Prince of Pingyuan, but after he became emperor, he did not make her empress, but made his concubine Lady Mao as empress instead. She was upset, and Lady Bian tried to console her, and her response was, "the Caos have a tradition for favouring dishonourable women," forgetting that Lady Bian was formerly a courtesan. Lady Bian was greatly offended, but did not punish her further than having her sent back to Cao Rui's princely manor house in Ye.

In the spring of 230, just before her death, Cao Rui granted Lady Bian's paternal grandparents and father posthumous honors; her paternal grandfather Bian Guang (卞广) was thus posthumously known as Marquis Gong of Kaiyang (开阳恭侯), while her father Bian Yuan's (卞远) posthumous title was Marquis Jing (敬侯).

== Death and burial ==
The Annals of Emperor Ming of the Records of the Three Kingdoms state that the Grand Empress Dowager Bian died on 9 July 230. The Records go on to say that she was buried with honours due an empress dowager alongside her husband Cao Cao in the Gaoling (literally "high mausoleum") sometime between 28 July and 26 August 230.

Cao Cao's mausoleum, long considered lost, was discovered in 2008 with the three skeletons inside, one male and two female. The women were determined to be aged in their twenties and fifties respectively, which is discordant with the Records that put her age at 69 or 70 when Lady Bian died. This discrepancy has been one of the points used by skeptics to cast doubt on the identification of the mausoluem as Cao Cao's. Subsequent research has diminished the possibility that Lady Bian was interred in same tomb as Cao Cao as well as the neighbouring Xigaoxue No. 1 tomb, though the possibility of her being interred in a heretofore undiscovered tomb in the same mausoleum complex still remains.

== See also ==
- Cao Wei family trees#Lady Bian
- Lists of people of the Three Kingdoms

== Bibliography ==
- Chen, Shou; Pei, Songzhi (1999). Empresses and Consorts: Selections from Chen Shou's Records of the Three States With Pei Songzhi's Commentary. Translated by Cutter, Robert Joe; Crowell, William Gordon. University of Hawaii Press. ISBN 9780824819453.
- Lee, Lily Xiao Hong; Stefanowska, A. D; Wiles, Sue; Ho, Clara Wing-chung (1998). Biographical Dictionary of Chinese Women: Antiquity Through Sui, 1600 B.C.E.-618 C.E. M.E. Sharpe. ISBN 9780765641823.
