= Revenge of the Seven Daughters =

Art motif of late Han dynasty China

The Revenge of the Seven Daughters (Note: In Chinese, variously: traditional Chinese: 七女為父報仇; simplified Chinese: 七女为父报仇 (pinyin: Qī nǚ wéifù bàochóu), 七女為父復仇; 七女为父复仇 (Qī nǚ wéifù fùchóu), or 七女復仇; 七女复仇 (Qī nǚ fùchóu)) is a popular motif in the funerary art of Eastern Han dynasty China (25–220 CE). Despite the story being depicted on the walls of many Han tombs, no known textual records of the story exist. From pictorial evidence and limited inscriptions on cartouches, it is surmised that the story is about seven sisters who took revenge on an official for wrongly sentencing their father to death by ambushing the official's carriage on a bridge. The story's ubiquity in Han tombs speaks to the veneration of filial piety in the Confucian culture of the Han dynasty, though such displays of vigilantism were discouraged and curtailed in later dynasties.

Before the motif was identified as a revenge story, it was tentatively named the Battle at the Bridge (Note: traditional Chinese: 橋上戰爭圖; simplified Chinese: 桥上战争图; pinyin: qiáo shàng zhànzhēng tú) or the Water and Land Battle. (Note: traditional Chinese: 水陸攻戰圖; simplified Chinese: 水陆攻战图; pinyin: Shuǐlù gōng zhàn tú)

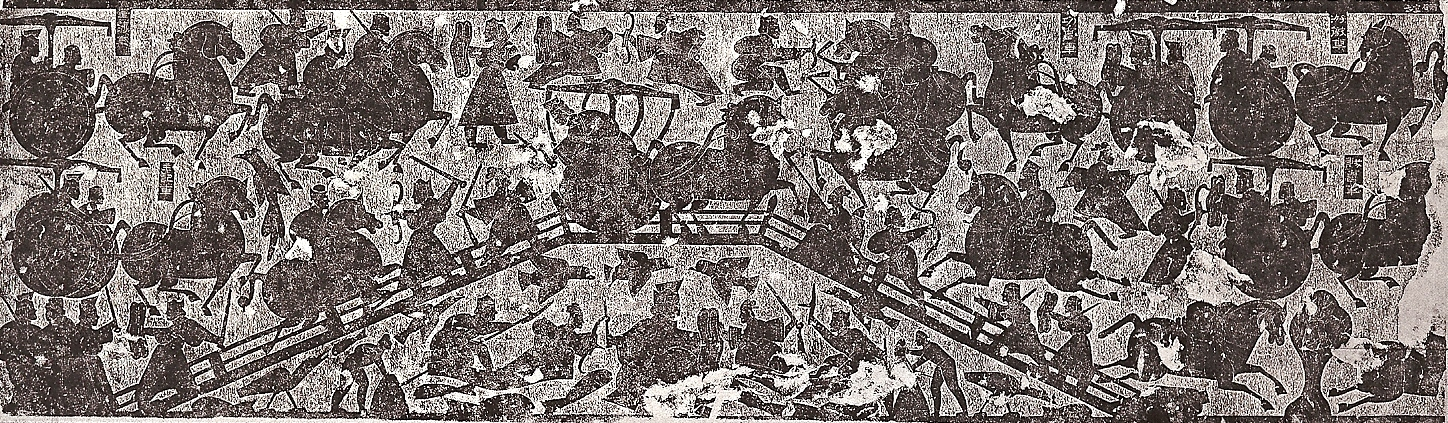
Rubbing of the Revenge of the Seven Daughters story carved on the west wall of the front stone chamber of the Wu Family Shrines

== Depictions ==
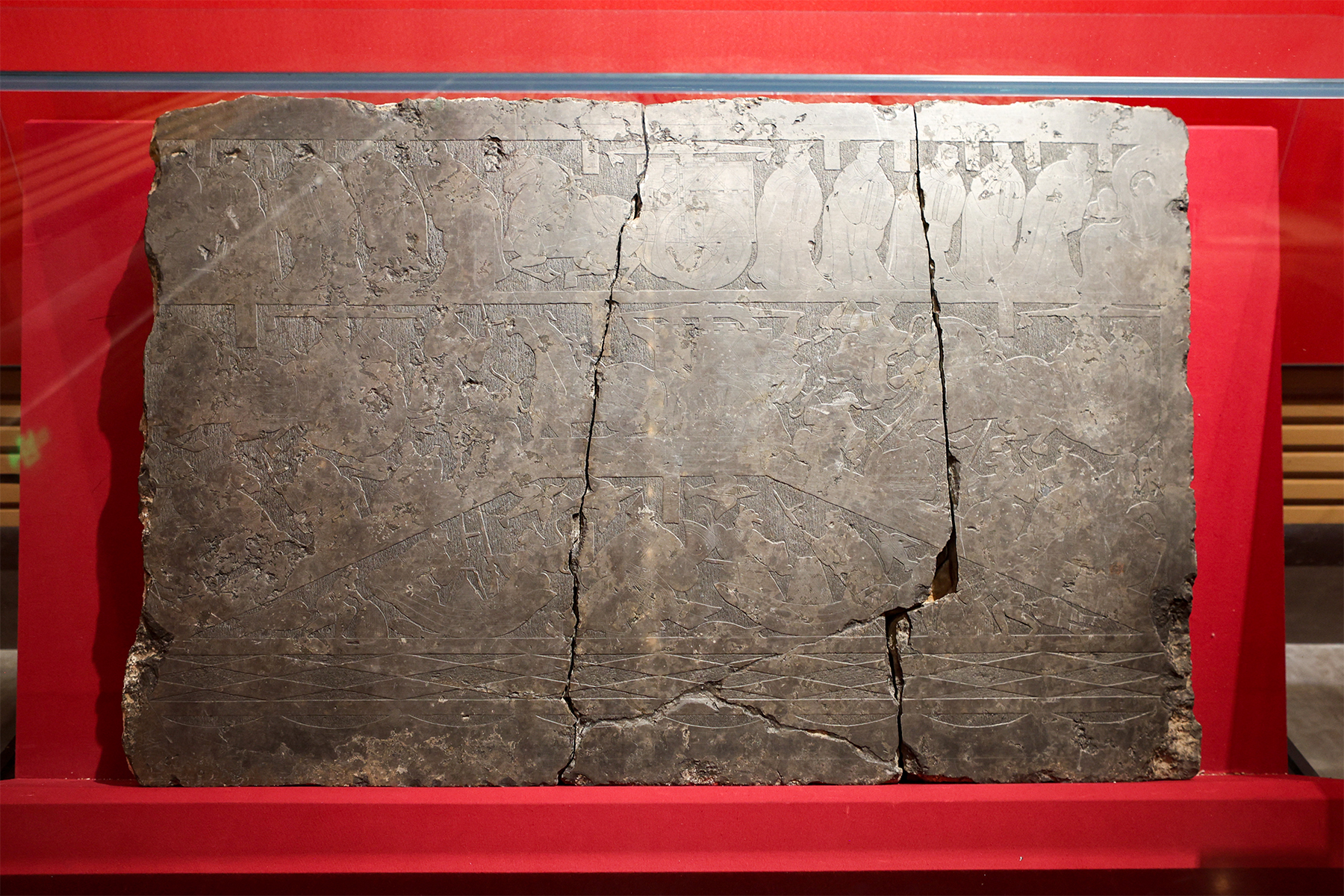
Stone carving of the Revenge of the Seven Daughters story in the Cao Cao Mausoleum

The motif is attested in sites across the provinces of Shandong, Henan, Anhui, and even Inner Mongolia. Notable sites with the motif include the Wu Family Shrines (where two instances exist), the Xiaotang Mountain Han Shrine, and the Cao Cao Mausoleum. The discovered examples of the motif all date from mid-to-late Eastern Han dynasty. The motif consistently consists of a bridge, a carriage procession, and the women assailants. Most scenes of the story depict the women armed with various weapons, though the mural in the Horinger tomb in Inner Mongolia has the women intercept the central carriage on horseback unarmed. The target of their attack, the official's carriage, is typically horse-drawn, but the carriage is ox-drawn in an illustration in a tomb in Chulan town (褚兰) of Suzhou, Anhui.

The most significant variation, however, is whether the scene depicts the official falling into the river under the bridge or not. Some depict the official being attacked in his carriage, some show him falling into the river where he is killed by women on boats, while some even have him simultaneously on his carriage and under the bridge. The variation may indicate the individual artisans' preferences for what they consider the most impactful moment of the narrative, with the simultaneous appearances of the official in some depictions indicating the Han artisans employing continuous narrative as a pictorial device.

== Reconstructed narrative ==
Although no Han or later literary text records the full story, scholars have reconstructed it from the images and inscriptions as follows:

A local official (variously identified in inscriptions as the Magistrate of Chang'an 長安令 or Xianyang 咸陽令) wrongfully sentences a man to death. The man's seven daughters resolve to avenge him by ambushing his entourage on a bridge over the Wei River. When the official's carriage reaches the centre, the sisters separate his carriage from the rest of the convoy and attack the official simultaneously. The official is forced from his carriage and falls into the river. He is then killed by some of the daughters either in pursuit or already hiding in boats under the bridge, completing the revenge.

== Historical background ==
The motif exemplifies Eastern Han ideals of filial piety, in which revenge for a slain parent was regarded as a moral imperative that could override legal prohibitions against private vengeance. The Confucian canon Book of Rites stipulates that "One should not live under the same heaven with one's father's murderer." Women fulfilling this filial duty were viewed positively in the Eastern Han dynasty, if not expected just as men were. Chinese texts such as the Biographies of Exemplary Women are replete with narratives of women taking upon themselves the task of vengeance, though no record of the seven daughters' revenge story survive in textual form. In a case from 179 CE, for example, officials refused to prosecute Zhao E, who decapitated her father's killer, to the point of being willing to relinquish their own positions, and she was eventually pardoned by amnesty. The story of the seven daughters, therefore, fits neatly into the culture of revenge in the Eastern Han, with the numerous depictions of the event being a visual reflection of the high esteem people at the time placed on vengeance in the name of filial piety.

The rampant culture of revenge was seen as problematic to the centralization of power since as early as the time of Huan Tan (23 BCE – 56 CE), though it would not be until the last years of the Han dynasty when Cao Cao (155–220) banned private revenge. His son Cao Pi, who overthrew the Han and became emperor of Cao Wei in 220 CE, enforced the ban by punishing offenders with extermination of whole clans. Under the new political environment, the story of the Revenge of the Seven Daughters fell out of vogue and became forgotten in later dynasties.

Although the full story of the seven daughters is not known in the historical record, there are possible references to the story. The 6th-century Water Classic notes the existence of a "Mound of the Seven Daughters" (七女塚) north of Chenggu County in Shaanxi that had been flooded in 429 CE. An inscribed tile was supposedly recovered from the flood, which relates the rumour that the mound was erected by seven sisters to bury their father Xiang Bo (項伯), who did not have sons. This Xiang Bo could not be the noble Xiang Bo who famously helped the first Han emperor Liu Bang escape the Feast at Swan Goose Gate, since the noble was given a fief in Sheyang County in Jiangsu, and was succeeded by a son. It remains unclear whether the revenge story and the mound are related.

== Interpretations ==
The pictorial motif representing the Revenge of the Seven Sisters story is noted since the Song dynasty, when the scholar Hong Kuo (洪适; 1117–1184) published rubbings of the stone slabs of the Han dynasty Wu Family Shrines while they still stood, though the story behind the motif had been lost by this time. The Qing dynasty antiquarian Feng Yunpeng (馮雲鵬; 1765–1839) described the scenes as the "Battle at the Bridge", which was followed by the French sinologist Édouard Chavannes (1865–1918).

Interpretations of the scene range from the historical to the symbolic in the 20th century. Japanese researcher Yoshiko Doi (土井淑子) proposes that the scene could be a depiction of Mother Lü's rebellion in 14 CE, explaining the presence of women in the battle. In an exercise in historical particularism, Alexander Soper argues that the motif must be connected to the life of the tomb's owner, and ends up having to offer multiple individualized interpretations to explain the inclusion of the same theme at many other tomb sites in the area. Anneliese Bulling suggests that the bridge scene is symbolic of the journey to the afterlife, or a ritualized re-enactment of such. Patricia Berger, in this vein, interpreted the scene as part of the danuo exorcism ritual (大儺).

In 1993, a Song dynasty tomb containing Han era stone reliefs was discovered during a road construction in Dongguan (东莞), Ju County of Shandong. Local researchers noted the visual similarity of the relief labelled "Seven Daughters" (七女) with the "Battle at the Bridge" scene in the Wu Family Shrines, and the label allowed them to connect these scenes with a Han mural in a tomb in Horinger, Inner Mongolia containing the words "Seven Daughters Avenge Their Father" (七女為父報仇), depicting a similar scene on a bridge. These observations "shed light on a century-old dispute over the interpretation of the battle scene", and the identification of the "Battle at the Bridge" motif as the seven daughters' revenge story is now generally accepted in China.
