= Cao Cao Mausoleum =

Ancient tomb in China

- 曹操高陵 (Chinese)
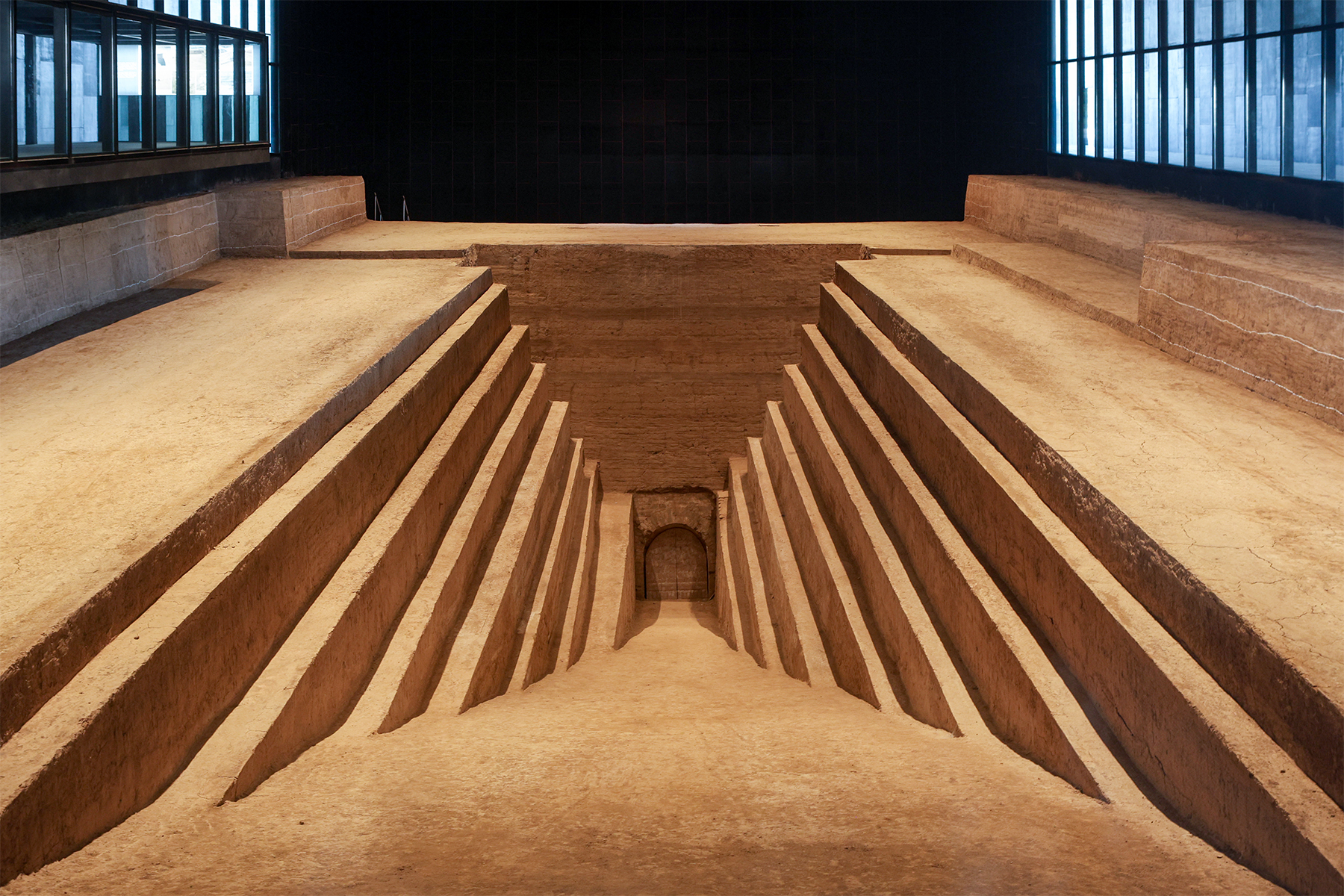
- The entryway of the tomb on display in the Cao Cao Mausoleum Museum
- Interactive map of Cao Cao Mausoleum
- 36°14′27″N 114°15′35″E
- Type: Mausoleum
- Location: Xigaoxue Village, Anfeng Township, Anyang County, Anyang City, Henan Province, China

History
- Built: AD 220

Cao Cao Mausoleum
- Chinese: 曹操高陵
Transcriptions
Standard Mandarin
- Hanyu Pinyin: Cáo Cāo Gāolíng

Gaoling Mausoleum of Wei
- Chinese: 魏高陵
Transcriptions
Standard Mandarin
- Hanyu Pinyin: Wèi Gāolíng

Xigaoxue Tomb No. 2
- Traditional Chinese: 西高穴2號墓
- Simplified Chinese: 西高穴2号墓
Transcriptions
Standard Mandarin
- Hanyu Pinyin: Xīgāoxuè Èrhào Mù

The Cao Cao Mausoleum, also known as the Gaoling Mausoleum of Wei and the Xigaoxue Tomb No. 2, is a tomb in Xigaoxue Village, Anyang County, Henan Province, China. It is purported to be the burial site of Cao Cao (155–220 CE), a prominent warlord who lived in the late Eastern Han dynasty. The discovery of the tomb was reported on 27 December 2009 by the Henan Provincial Cultural Heritage Bureau. In 2013, the tomb became part of the seventh batch of Major Historical and Cultural Sites Protected at the National Level in China.

== Historical background ==
Cao Cao (155–220 CE) was a warlord and politician who rose to prominence towards the end of the Han dynasty (c. 184–220 CE) and became the de facto head of government in China during that period. In 216 CE, he received the title of a vassal king – King of Wei (魏王) – from Emperor Xian, the figurehead Han emperor whom he controlled. Through his military conquests, he laid the foundation for what was to become the state of Cao Wei (220–266 CE), which was established by his son and successor, Cao Pi. Cao Cao died in 220 CE in Luoyang at the age of 65 and was posthumously honoured as "King Wu" (武王; literally "martial king") by Emperor Xian.

According to his official biography in the Records of the Three Kingdoms (Sanguozhi), he was interred in the Gaoling (高陵; literally "high mausoleum") about one month after his death. Before he died, Cao Cao left directions that he was to be buried near the tomb of the ancient minister Ximen Bao, and that no valuables, gold, or jade were to be put into his tomb, nor should it be marked by mounds or trees, in accordance with his own sumptuary laws published in 205 against the elaborate burial customs of the Later Han. However, Cao Cao's mausoleum did have structures above ground at one point, as his son Cao Pi had reportedly shamed Yu Jin by depicting the general's surrender on the walls of the masouleum complex. In 222, as Cao Pi made preparations for his own burial, he decreed that the structures at Gaoling be destroyed so that dynastic worship would be carried at a single ancestral temple near his own capital of Luoyang. Cao Cao's wife the Empress Dowager Bian was recorded to be buried with Cao Cao in Gaoling when she died in 230.

The location of Gaoling remained known through the Tang and Song dynasties, as Emperor Taizong of Tang (598–649) made sacrifices at Gaoling while campaigning against Goguryeo in 645, and Emperor Taizu of Song (927–976) set up guards at ancient tombs including Gaoling in 963.

During the Song dynasty, however, another tradition began to take hold alleging that Cao Cao had 72 tombs constructed to serve as decoys and protection against grave robbers. This legend was popularised by authors in later periods, including Luo Guanzhong's Romance of the Three Kingdoms, one of the Four Classic Chinese Novels, where Cao Cao looms large as the novel's cunning antagonist. Over time, the whereabouts of the historical Gaoling became lost. The Northern Dynasty Tombs in Ci County, Handan, Hebei were initially believed to be the 72 tombs, but archaeologists later confirmed that they belonged to the imperial families of the Eastern Wei and Northern Qi dynasties and have nothing to do with Cao Cao.

== Discovery and excavation ==
Legendary decoy tombs notwithstanding, researchers in the 20th century had a general idea that Cao Cao's mausoleum was west of the now-ruined Ye city, visible from the Bronze Bird Terrace that he had built. The search for the mausoleum was helped by the discovery of the epitaph of the Later Zhao official Lu Qian (魯潛; 271–345) in 1998, which, in lieu of a description of Lu Qian's life, gives a detailed record of Lu's grave in relation to local landmarks of his time, including Cao Cao's mausoleum. This was the first time a record of Cao Cao's mausoleum is found beyond traditional texts, and researchers began to consider the mausoleum to be in the vicinity of Xigaoxue village (西高穴村) from the new evidence.

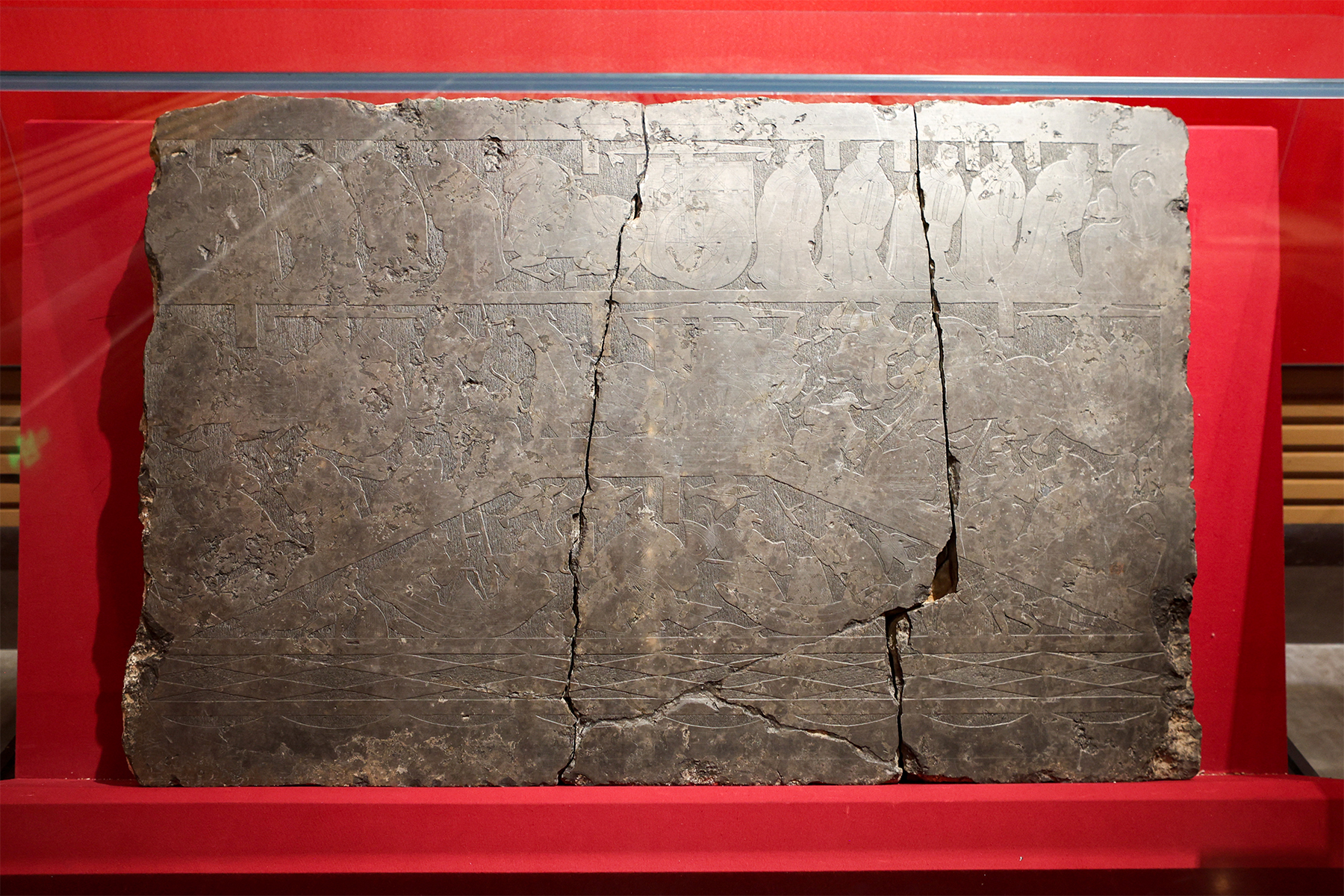
A stone carving depicting the Revenge of the Seven Daughters story from the Cao Cao Mausoleum

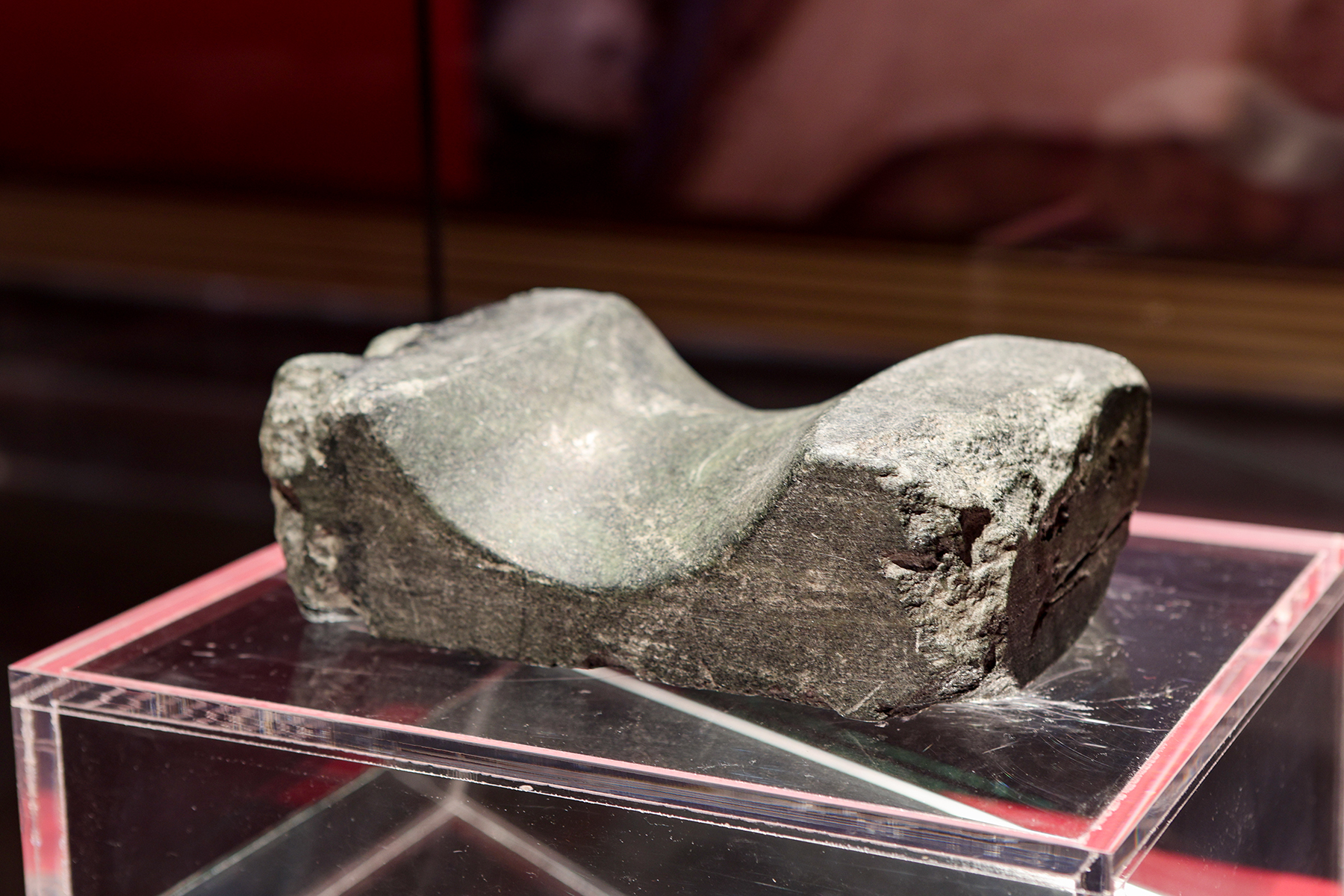
Cao Cao's stone pillow

The tomb was discovered in 2006 when workers at a nearby kiln were digging for mud to make bricks. Its discovery was not initially reported, and grave robbers had frequented the site for years until the Henan Provincial Institute of Cultural Heritage and Archaeology intervened in a rescue operation in 2008. Local authorities were able to retrieve a number of items from grave robbers who claimed to have stolen from the tomb, including a stone tablet and a stone pillow bearing the inscription 'King Wu of Wei' – Cao Cao's posthumous title; a stone slab with carvings of the Revenge of the Seven Daughters motif; and a fragment of a jade bi disc that matched another fragment later found in the tomb by archaeologists. Over the following years, archaeologists recovered more than 250 relics from the tomb, including stone murals depicting popular Han motifs, stone tablets bearing inscriptions of sacrificial objects, and several items labelled as "personal belongings" frequently used by Cao Cao, including weapons and stone pillows. The bones of three persons were also unearthed and identified to be those of a man in his 60s, a woman in her 50s and another woman in her 20s. The discovery of the tomb was announced by archaeological officials on 27 December 2009. The excavation of the tomb was completed by the end of 2010, with over 400 artefacts unearthed and 100 damaged relics restored by the provincial archaeologist team.

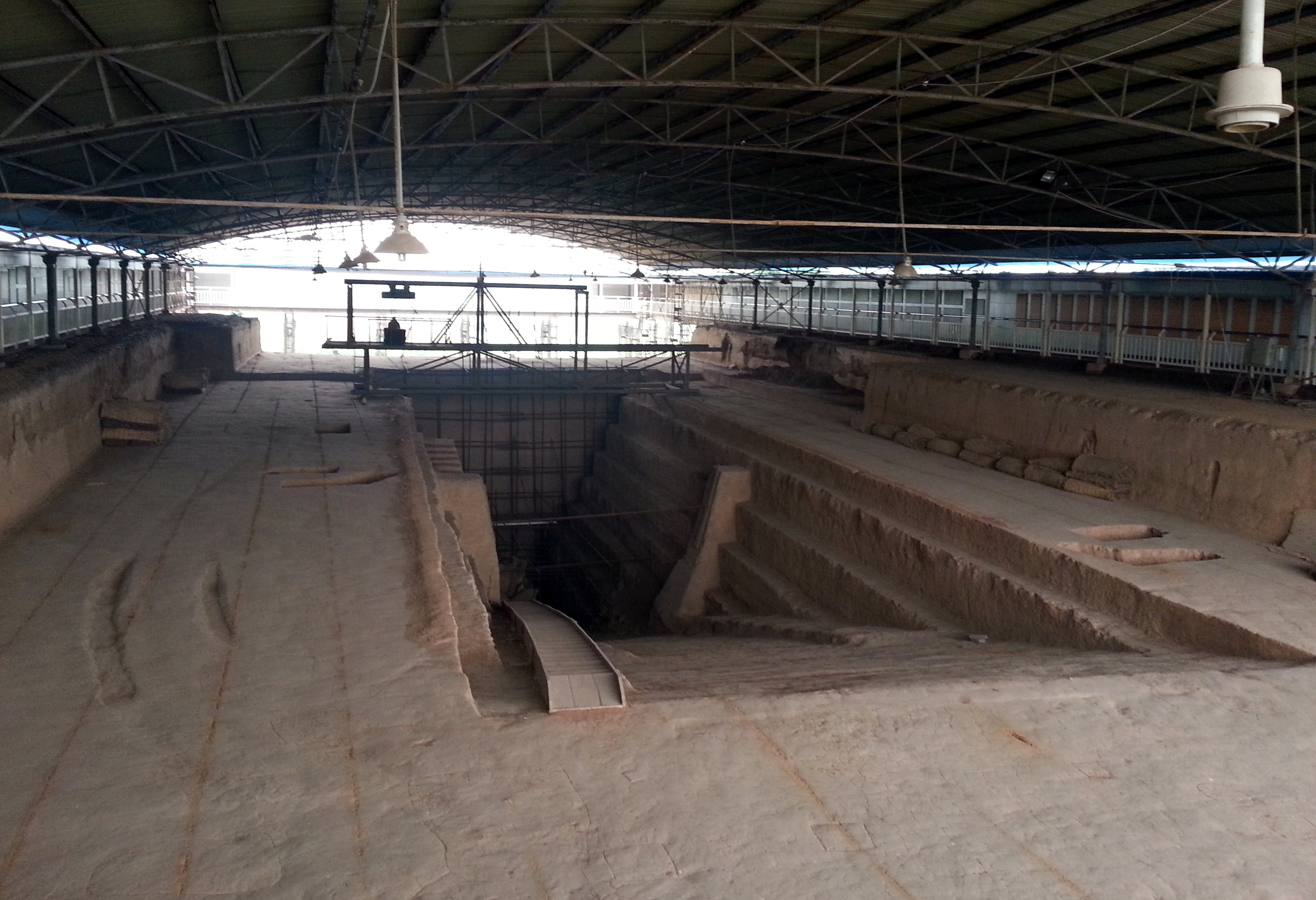
The dig site in 2013

The tomb, made of bricks, faced east and formed a shape resembling the Chinese character jia (甲; jiǎ) when viewed from above. It covered an area of roughly 740 square metres and its deepest point was about 15 metres below the ground. The underground tomb has two main chambers (front and back), four side chambers and connecting passages. An inclined passage 39.5 metres long and 9.8 metres wide leads to the underground chambers.

Media reports from 2018 describe the tomb complex as having an outer rammed earth foundation, a spirit way, and structures on the east and south sides. Archaeologists have also noted that the tomb's exterior and perimeter appear to be deliberately left unmarked; there are neither structures above the ground around the tomb nor massive piles of debris in the vicinity. This shows that Cao Pi had initially built a large cemetery to emphasize his filial piety against his father's wishes, but ordered the monuments on the surface to be systematically dismantled a few years later to honour his father's request to be buried in a simple manner in a concealed location, as well as to prevent tomb robbers from finding and looting the tomb.

Archaeologists also found another tomb next to Cao Cao's that was built around the same time. This other tomb, known as Xigaoxue Tomb No. 1 to archaeologists, contains only clothes and no signs of human remains. Experts believe that this empty tomb may have been a cenotaph for Cao Cao's eldest son, Cao Ang, who was killed at the Battle of Wancheng in 197, his body never found.

== Tomb identification debate ==
Due to Cao Cao's fame in Chinese history, literature, and contemporary popular culture, the announcement of his tomb's discovery generated significant attention across multiple levels of society. Many sceptics and experts have raised doubts about its authenticity, particularly on the internet, that they have come to be known as the "Anti-Cao faction" (倒曹派) in the media. The controversy surrounding the tomb was described to be unprecedented in "the breadth of attention it has attracted, the sheer number of people involved in the discussions, and the intensity of the related debates [...] in the field of Chinese archaeology"—controversies of such scale were noted to be "rare even across the entire realm of humanities and social sciences."

Sceptics questioned the identification of the tomb from various angles. Some, like Yuan Jixi (袁济喜), a vice dean of the Renmin University of China's School of Chinese Classics, suggested that the items in the tomb cannot be guaranteed as authentic because the tomb had been greatly disturbed by grave robbers and the artefacts may even have been deliberately placed in the tomb for deceptive purposes. Others suggested that the tomb did not belong to Cao Cao and offered alternatives such as his grandson Cao Huan or the Later Zhao ruler Shi Hu.

On 31 December 2009, the Henan Provincial Institute of Archaeology invited experts from the Chinese Academy of Social Sciences's Institute of Archaeology, Zhengzhou University, and Henan University to join its researchers in a seminar to discuss the findings from the tomb and respond to queries from the press. Aside from affirming the identification of the tomb as Cao Cao's, the experts noted that the use of ancient DNA technology in archaeological research has yet to be fully developed to be able to identify the male skeleton as Cao Cao's. Even if the technology is fully functional, it would be difficult to find and verify a living descendent of Cao Cao. The DNA of the skeleton could, in theory, be compared with one from an excavated tomb of a confirmed Cao Cao relative; however, the only set of skeletons that matches this criterion, from the tomb of Cao Cao's son Cao Zhi, had been lost since they were unearthed in 1951.

In January 2010, the State Administration of Cultural Heritage (SACH) stated that the procedures associated with the excavation process, archaeological research and verification, publishing of results, etc., were all in accordance with the rules of archaeological work. This statement by the SACH effectively served as a legal endorsement of the results from the research conducted throughout 2009 which suggest that the tomb was Cao Cao's.

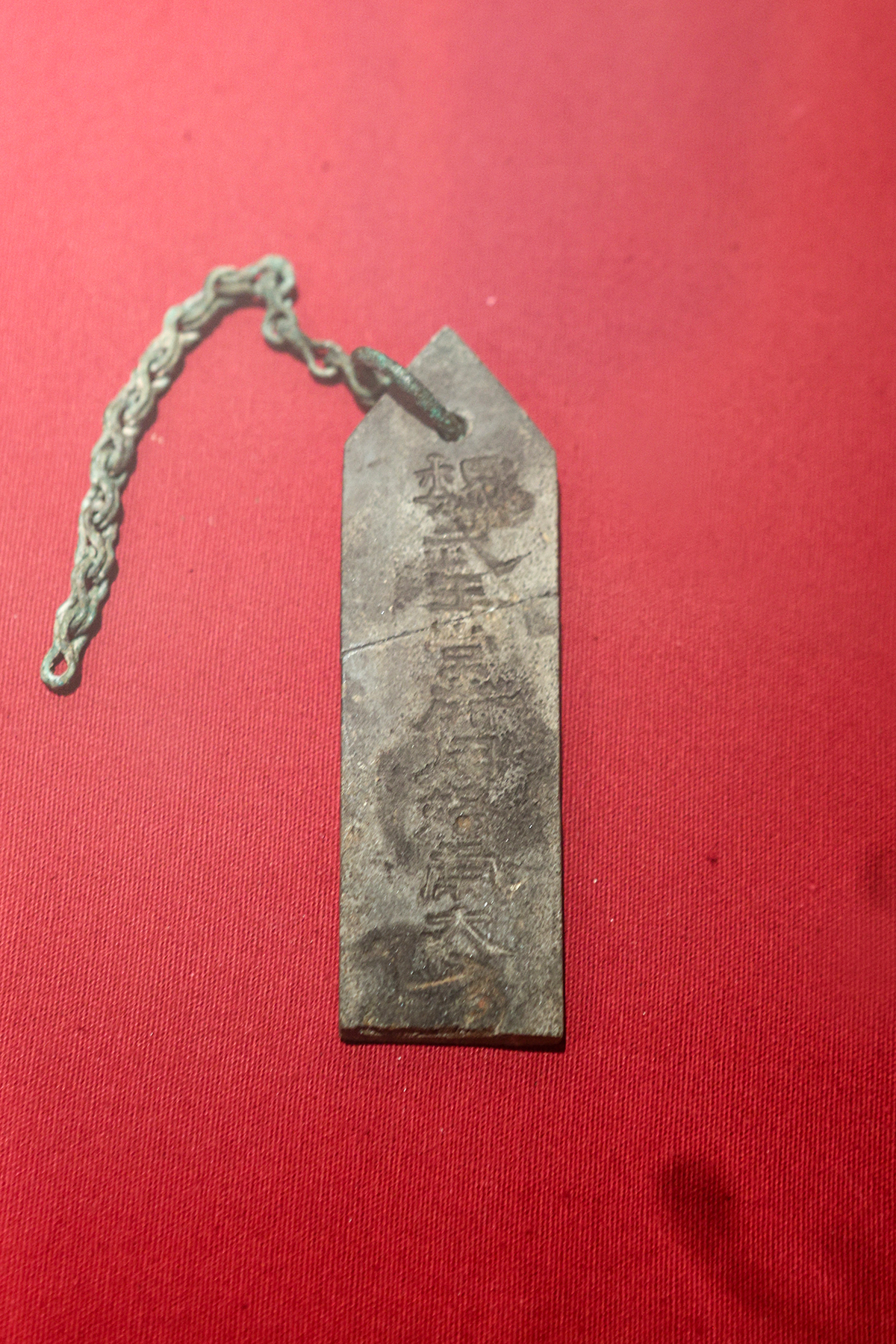
Stone tablet with inscription reading "large blade for killing tigers often used by King Wu of Wei" (魏武王常所用挌虎大刀)

In August 2010, the "Anti-Cao faction" convened a "National High-Level Forum on Culture of the Three Kingdoms Period" (三国文化全国高层论坛) in Suzhou, Jiangsu where they presented evidence arguing that the findings and the artefacts of the tomb are fake. During the forum, Lin Kuicheng (林奎成), a historian and member of the China Federation of Literary and Art Circles, argued that Cao Cao should not be referred to as "King Wu of Wei" before 220 CE since it would be taboo to use this title when his son Cao Pi had inherited the "King of Wei" title and was still living then. Furthermore, Lin Kuicheng noted that when Emperor Xian relinquished his throne to Cao Pi, he referred to Cao Pi and Cao Cao as "King of Wei" and "King Wu" respectively in his official abdication edict—Cao Cao was never referred to as "King Wu of Wei" in the edict.

The August 2010 Suzhou forum represented the high point of the "Anti-Cao" activities. Yan Peidong (闫沛东), a self-proclaimed scholar on the Three Kingdoms period and a representative figure of the skeptics, publicly claimed to have conclusive proof that the artefacts from the Cao Cao Mausoleum were all fabricated, but failed to present evidence of his claims or his credentials when challenged by reporters. In December 2011, the public security bureau in Xingtai, Hebei announced that "Yan Peidong" is actually an assumed identity of Hu Zejun (胡泽军), a fraudster on the run for more than six years at the time. Since then, "Anti-Cao" activities subsided and failed to gain traction on academic platforms and the media by 2014. With the release of the formal archaeological report about the tomb in 2016, the academic community had moved on from the identity debate and went on to study the tomb with the understanding that it does indeed belong to Cao Cao.

Questions remain. Cao Cao's wife Lady Bian was recorded to be buried in Gaoling alongside him when she died in 230 at the age of 69 or 70. However, the female skeletons found in Cao Cao's tomb were determined to be in their twenties and fifties. This discrepancy has been one of the points used by skeptics to cast doubt on the identification of the mausoluem as Cao Cao's. Subsequent research has diminished the possibility that Lady Bian was interred in same tomb as Cao Cao as well as the neighbouring Xigaoxue No. 1 tomb, though the possibility of her being interred in a heretofore undiscovered tomb in the same mausoleum complex still remains.

== Current status ==
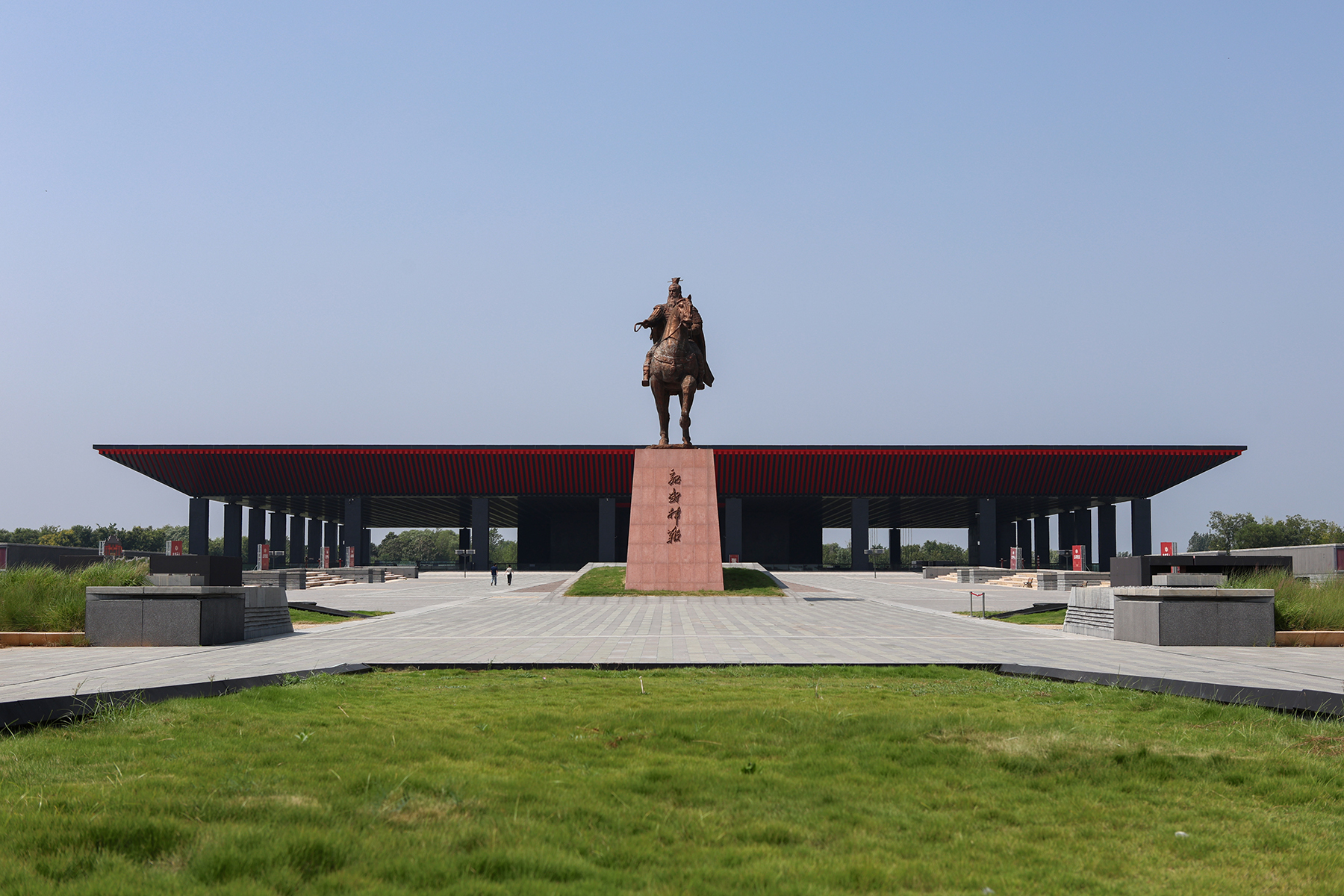
The Cao Cao Mausoleum Museum atop the tomb site

In 2010, the tomb became part of the fifth batch of Major Historical and Cultural Sites Protected at the National Level in China.

To enhance the protection of the tomb, the local government in Anyang established a special committee to oversee and manage the tomb. The government made arrangements to build a temporary exhibition hall and a supporting ring corridor at the site before an official museum was built.

In December 2011, the government announced the construction of a museum on the site of the tomb to be named 'Cao Cao Mausoleum Museum' (曹操高陵博物馆). On 12 November 2012, a private museum in Zhengzhou donated a Tang dynasty stele mentioning the tomb to the Cao Cao Mausoleum Museum. The museum officially opened in April 2023. Many young visitors to the tomb would leave the headache drug ibuprofen on the tomb (Cao Cao had suffered severe migraines during his life).

== See also ==
- Anyang funerary bed, misattributed to Cao Cao
