= Bronze Bird Terrace =

Architectural icon of China's Three Kingdoms period

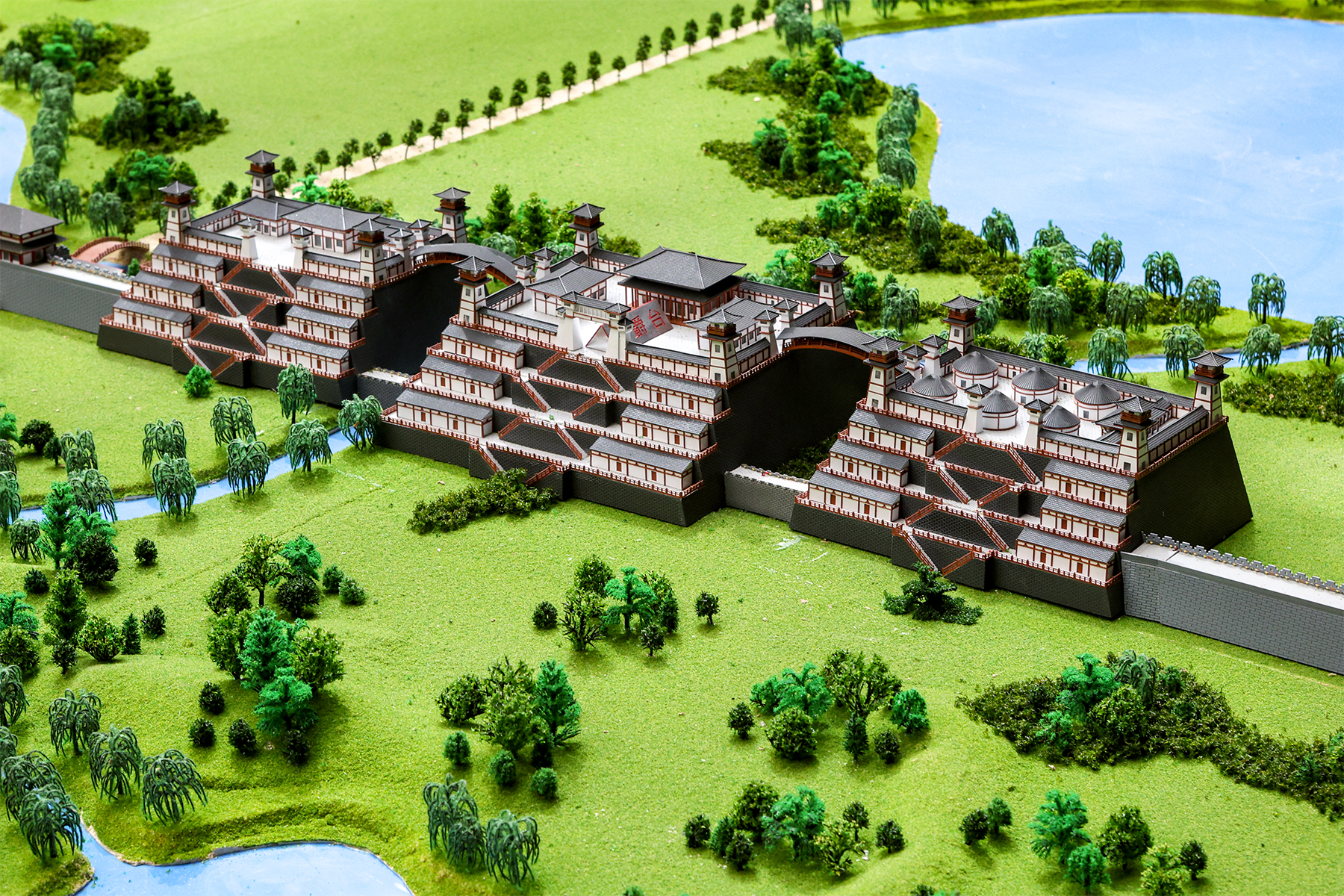
Model of the Bronze Bird Terrace (center) with the two adjoining terraces, Yecheng Museum, Hebei

The Bronze Bird Terrace (traditional Chinese: 銅雀臺; simplified Chinese: 铜雀台; pinyin: Tóngquètái) was an iconic structure in the city of Ye built in AD 210 by Cao Cao, the prominent warlord of the late Eastern Han dynasty. Despite reconstructions after Cao Cao's time that exceeded his in scale, the Bronze Bird Terrace is metonymous with Cao Cao in Classical Chinese poetry, where the terrace is a popular topic. Although its destruction in 577 and natural disasters left only ruins of the Bronze Bird Terrace, the terrace lives on in the Chinese cultural memory through its connection with Cao Cao and retains its place in Chinese literature and modern media pertaining to the Three Kingdoms period.

== History ==
=== Cao Cao ===
The city of Ye by the Zhang River was the seat of the Wei Commandery and an important regional center in the Han dynasty. When the dynasty fractured into warlord states, the city served as the headquarters of Yuan Shao. After Yuan Shao's death, rival warlord Cao Cao took control of the city in the Battle of Ye in 204 and made the city his chief residence. As the years of war had destroyed the inner city, Cao Cao set about rebuilding the city in the mold of an imperial capital. He initiated a number of works in Ye, digging canals in and around the city to improve irrigation and drainage, and building the Hall of Civil Splendour (文昌殿) which was to become the centerpiece of Ye's palace complex. The Bronze Bird Terrace was erected in the northwest corner of the city in 210 as part of these works. It was soon joined by two shorter terraces in 213, the Metal Tiger Terrace (金虎臺) to the south and the Ice Well Terrace (冰井臺) to the north. Together, they are referred to as the Three Terraces (三臺).

The Bronze Bird Terrace was recorded to be 10 zhang high, which translates to about 23 meters, while the other two terraces were shorter at 8 zhang (~18 meters). Modern observers measure the bases of the Bronze Bird Terrace and the Metal Tiger Terrace at 122 m north to south and 70 m east to west. Atop the terraces were pavilions of more than a hundred rooms each: According to the Wen Xuan, the Bronze Bird had 101 rooms, Metal Tiger had 109, and Ice Well had 145. The terraces were linked to each other and the palace by raised walkways, and had ample street-level access connecting them with the rest of the city. Underneath the terraces were storage facilities for grain, salt, water, fuel, graphite, and—in the case of the Ice Well Terrace—ice. Around the terraces sprang the Bronze Bird Garden (銅雀園), also known as the West Garden (西園) since it was immediately west of the palace. The garden took up the whole northwestern quadrant of the city.

The name "Bronze Bird Terrace" evokes the Western Han capital Chang'an since it references auspicious symbols from an old song: "To the west of Chang'an, a pair of circular watchtowers, / On top of them perches a pair of Bronze Birds. / They sing once, and five grains grow; / They sing again, and five grains ripen". The Metal Tiger Terrace was named after the tiger tally that Cao Cao received from the Han emperor as part of the Nine Bestowments in 213.

=== Period of Disunity ===
After Cao Cao died in 220, his son Cao Pi forced the abdication of the last emperor of Eastern Han, becoming the first emperor of Cao Wei. Although the main capital of Wei was relocated to Luoyang, Ye was still considered a secondary "northern capital". Cao Wei was replaced by the Jin dynasty in 263, who were later forced out of northern China by a series of non-Han states. Ye became the capital of several of these states: the Later Zhao (319–351), Former Yan (337–370), Ran Wei (350–352), Eastern Wei (534–550), and Northern Qi (550–577).

Shi Hu of the Later Zhao became emperor in 334 through a coup against his cousin Shi Hong, and made Ye his capital next year. Known for his extravagance and indulgence, Shi Hu utilized up to 400,000 workers on construction projects in his new capital city along with Chang'an and Luoyang. The Three Terraces of Ye, which had fallen into disrepair up to this point, were transformed by these constructions to be "more adorned and embellished than they were at the beginning of [Cao] Wei". The Bronze Bird Terrace was heightened to 12 zhang, and its top was covered by a circular pavilion with "linking ridgepoles and rafters", five stories high, and topped with a bronze bird sculpture. Together, the Bronze Bird Terrace and its pavilion measured 27 zhang tall. The Metal Tiger Terrace was renamed to Metal Phoenix Terrace (金鳳臺) to avoid a naming taboo as "tiger" (hu) is Shi Hu's given name.

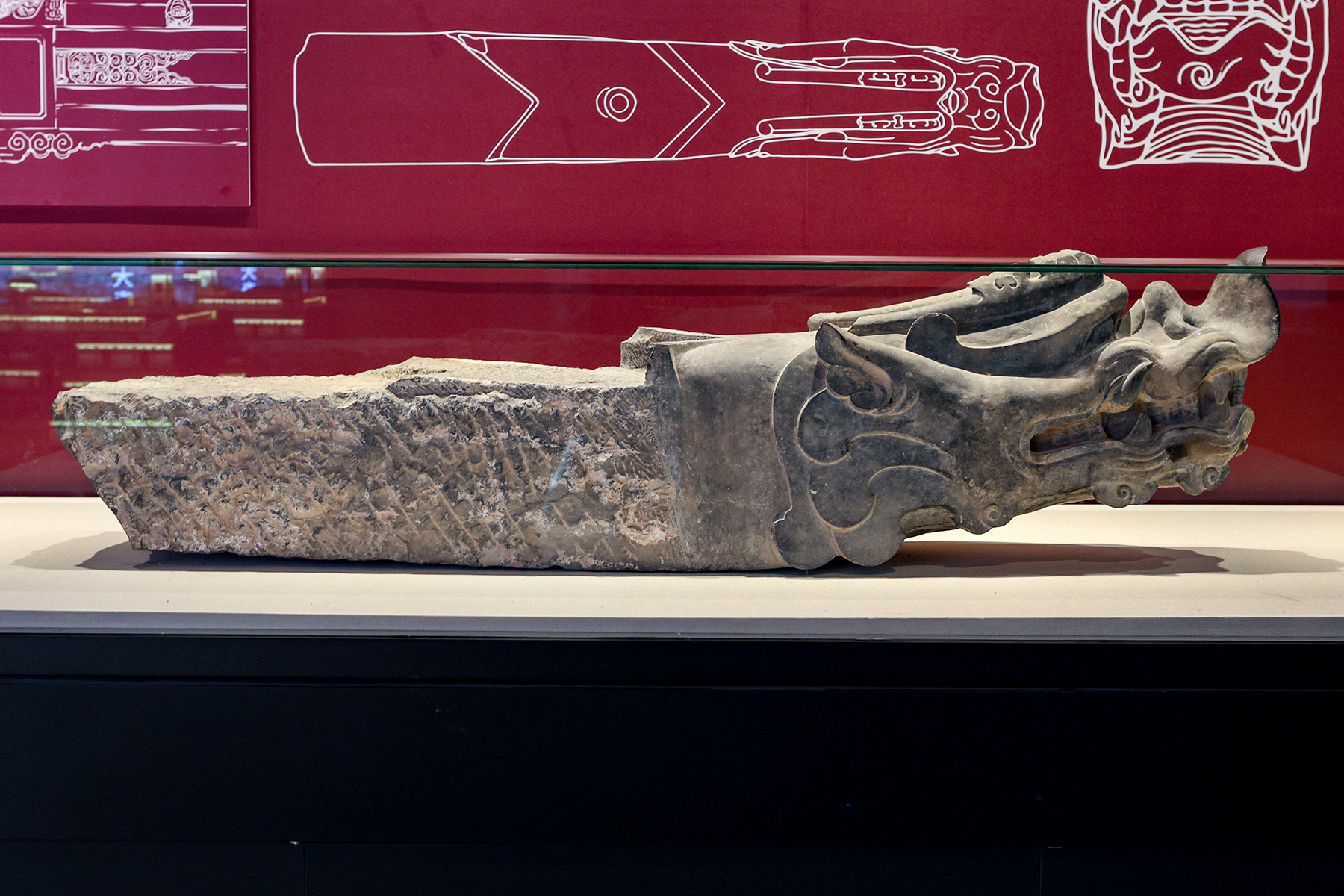
Stone chi head dated to the Eastern Wei to Northern Qi dynasties unearthed from the Bronze Bird Terrace site, Yecheng Museum

Shi Hu died in 349, after which his sons killed one another for the throne only to be exterminated by Ran Min, whose state of Ran Wei lasted two years in Ye before being conquered by Murong Jun of the Former Yan in 352. Murong Jun moved his capital to Ye in 357, upon which he ordered the repair of its palaces and the Bronze Bird Terrace. Former Yan fell to Former Qin in 370, and Ye only became capital again under Eastern Wei and then the Northern Qi. In 558, the old Three Terraces were renovated under the Northern Qi, which had mobilized 300,000 three hundred thousand workmen to make them "higher and grander" than ever before. The terraces were renamed again at this time, with Bronze Bird being renamed as Golden Phoenix (金鳳), Metal Tiger as Sagely Response (聖應), and Ice Well as Magnificent Light (崇光).

Triggered by an invasion by the Northern Zhou in 577, Northern Qi quickly disintegrated within a month, with large scale defections of court and military personnel. The incoming Emperor Wu of Northern Zhou issued the "Edict to Destroy Gardens and Terraces of the State of Qi" (毀撤齊國園臺詔) on 2 March 577 in which he denounced the wasteful extravagance of the Qi, proclaimed a return to restraint and frugality, and ordered the destruction of Ye's gardens and the Three Terraces. Emperor Wu died the next year, and his son Emperor Xuan died less than a year on the throne. Emperor Xuan's father-in-law Yang Jian made a bid for the throne, which prompted the Zhou loyalist general Yuchi Jiong to rise against him in Ye. After Yuchi Jiong was defeated in 580, Yang Jian evacuated the population of Ye and razed the city to the ground. Yang Jian would declare himself emperor of the Sui dynasty in 581 and go on to reunify China in 589, ending the Period of Disunity that started since the end of the Han dynasty in 220.

=== Later history ===
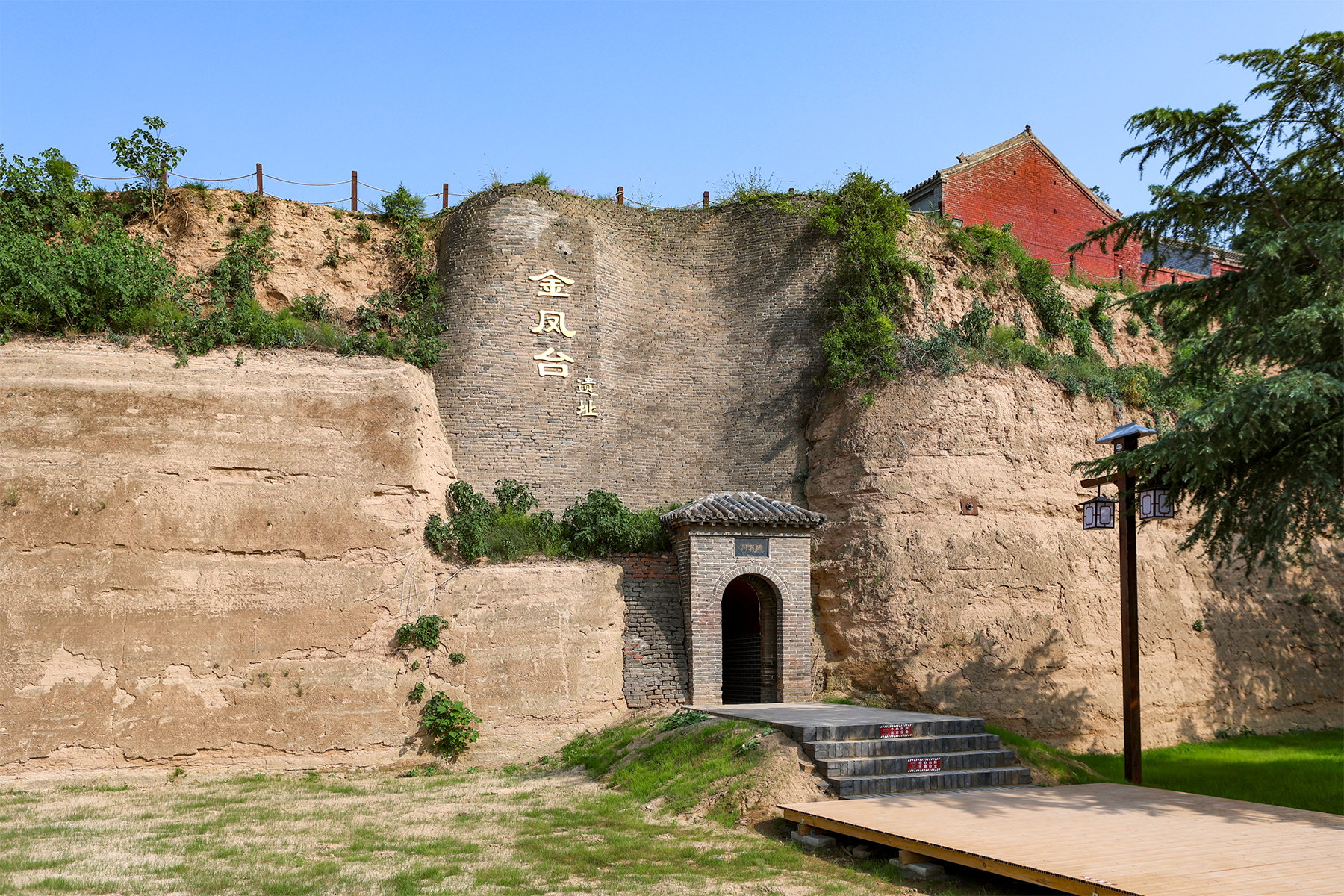
Metal Phoenix Terrace, the only extant one of the Three Terraces

Despite the destruction of Ye and the terrace buildings, the foundations of the Three Terraces survived into the Song and Yuan periods. A Buddhist temple named Yongning Temple (永寧寺) was erected on the foundations of the Bronze Bird Terrace, while a Taoist monastery named Dongxiao Monastery (洞霄觀) was built on the Metal Tiger's. The Ice Well Terrace was noted to have been washed by the Zhang River, causing one corner to erode away. Today, after centuries of flooding by the Zhang River, only the Metal Tiger Terrace remained visible, while the Bronze Bird Terrace could only be identified through archaeology. The extant Metal Tiger Terrace (now known as the Metal Phoenix), mistakenly identified by the locals as the more famous Bronze Bird Terrace, is only 12 meters tall.

The ruins of Ye, of which the Three Terraces is a part, were made a Major Historical and Cultural Site Protected at the National Level in 1988. The site of the Three Terraces, now administratively in Santai village (三台村; "Three Terrace Village") of Linzhang County, was made into a park of 20 square kilometers, costing 75.62 million yuan. The park includes the original foundations of the Golden Phoenix Terrace, a museum showing various unearthed artifacts, and locales commemorating Cao Cao and Jian'an poetry.

== In poetry ==
=== Jian'an poetry ===
The poetic tradition of the Bronze Bird Terrace began soon after its completion, when Cao Cao brought his sons Cao Pi and Cao Zhi to the terrace in 212 and all three wrote rhapsodies (fu) to mark the occasion. Cao Cao and Cao Pi's poems on this occasion only survive in fragments, but Cao Zhi's Ascending the Terrace (登臺賦) extolling Cao Cao's creation is extant in its entirety. That the "Three Caos" (as the three are collectively known), primus inter pares among the poets of the Jian'an period, all wrote about the Bronze Bird Terrace cemented its place in the poetic imagination of the Jian'an period (196-220), and the laudatory tone that Cao Pi and Cao Zhi took here contributed to the terrace being seen as a symbol of Cao Cao's success, ambitions, or desires.

Also, the Bronze Bird Terrace and its associated garden were used as places of merrymaking, such that they became the subject of a subset of Jian'an poetry known as "feast poems" (公燕詩), where poets such as Cao Zhi and Liu Zhen (劉楨) write of fleeting happiness and the essence of carpe diem.

從明后之嬉遊兮
聊登臺以娛情 2
見天府之廣開兮
觀聖德之所營 4
建高殿之嵯峨兮
浮雙闕乎太清 6
立冲天之華觀兮
連飛閣乎西城 8
臨漳川之長流兮
望眾果之滋榮 10
仰春風之和穆兮
聽百鳥之悲鳴 12
天功恒其既立兮
家願得而獲呈 14
揚仁化於宇內兮
盡肅恭於上京 16
雖桓文之為盛兮
豈足方乎聖明 18
休矣美矣
惠澤遠揚 20
翼佐我皇家兮
寧彼四方 22
同天地之矩量兮
齊日月之輝光 24
永貴尊而無極兮
等年壽於東王 26

— Cao Zhi, Ascending the Terrace (登臺賦)
Translation:

Let me follow in the footsteps of the enlightened ruler that I may rejoice,
And ascend the storied terrace that I may gladden my heart,
That I may see the wide extent of the palace,
That I may gaze upon the plans of the virtuous one.
He has established the exalted gates high as the hills,
He has built the lofty towers piercing the blue vault,
He has set up the beautiful building in the midst of the heavens,
Whence the eye can range over the cities of the west.
On the banks of the rolling River Zhang he planned it,
Whence abundance of fruits could be looked for in his gardens.
Look up; and there is the gorgeous harmony of springtime,
And the singing of many birds delighting the ear;
The lofty sky stands over all.
The house desires success in its double undertaking,
That the humane influence may be poured out over all the world,
That the perfection of reverence may be offered to the Ruler.
Only the richly prosperous rule of dukes Huan and Wen
Could compare with that of the sacred understanding.
That fortune! What beauty!
The gracious kindness spreads afar,
The imperial family is supported,
Peace reigns over all the empire,
Bounded only by the universe.
Bright as the glory of the sun and moon,
Ever honorable and ever enduring,
The Ruler shall live to the age of the eastern emperor.

— translated by C.H. Brewitt-Taylor, with modifications

=== Bronze Bird Performers ===
As Cao Cao laid dying in 220, he dictated his will to his sons. After reflecting on his own life and addressing the division of his belongings, he stipulated the Bronze Bird Terrace to be the place where his concubines were to be accommodated, where rituals were to be held for his spirit, and where his sons could gaze his tomb:

My concubines and entertainers should all be accommodated on Bronze Bird Terrace. A couch of eight feet long enclosed with fine hemp curtains should be set up in the hall on the terrace. Every day, once in the morning and once in the afternoon, dried meat and other kinds of food should be offered to my spirit. On the first day and fifteenth day every month, the entertainers should give a musical performance in front of the curtains. You should all go up Bronze Bird Terrace from time to time and gaze at my tomb on the western mound.

— Cao Cao, "Testamentary Command" (遺令)

Cao Cao's will survived only through its inclusion in the preface of the Western Jin poet Lu Ji's elegy for Cao Cao. In the elegy itself, written around 298, Lu Ji creates a scene where instead of Cao Cao's sons, it is the female entertainers who were to gaze at Cao Cao's tomb from the Bronze Bird Terrace. At the end of the elegy, Lu Ji asks rhetorically: "Ascending Bronze Bird Terrace, they mourned together; Their beautiful eyes were fixed in a distant gaze, but what could they see?" The pathos of this scene, where women regularly perform and pine for their dead lord, became a trope of Six Dynasties poetry known as the "Bronze Bird Performers" (銅雀妓), and the terrace itself was transformed from a symbol of splendour and glory to one of loss and longing.

In Tang poetry, the now-ruined Bronze Bird Terrace joins historical imperial harems in the tradition of "palace resentment poems" (宮怨詩), where the women within were depicted as abandoned and wasting away their youths. Cao Cao, the harem master in these works, became satirized and criticized for his sensuality and obsession with the women entertainers, who he trapped in his terrace even after his death. It is from this tradition that the late-Tang poet Du Mu produced his famous quatrain "Red Cliffs" (赤壁), connecting the Battle of Red Cliffs with the Bronze Bird Terrace by textually placing in the terrace the Qiao sisters, famed beauties of the southern lands, had a fortuitous wind not blown in Zhou Yu's favour. The poem popularized the image of the Bronze Bird Terrace as a place of frustrated sexual desire.

=== Bronze Bird Inkstones ===
The underside of a Bronze Bird Inkstone in the Palace of Heavenly Purity collection, carved with the words "Jian'an Year 15" (210 AD), catalogued in the Xiqing Yanpu (西清硯譜), c. 1778

In the Tang dynasty, the literati began collecting tiles purported to be from the Bronze Bird Terrace and shaping them into inkstones. These Bronze Bird Inkstones (銅雀硯), as they came to be known, were so sought after by the time of the Song dynasty that locals began to make fake Bronze Bird Terrace tiles from a mold and bury them into the ground before making them into inkstones to sell for profit. One source claims that tiles from the Bronze Bird Terrace were made with clay filtered by fine linen then mixed with walnut oil, and inkstone made from these tiles "could hold water for days without drying up." Others describe that the water dried away as soon as it was poured onto the inkstone, and declare that the Bronze Bird Inkstones were unusable and "no different from any ordinary broken tile and brick."

Regardless of their authenticity or utility (or lack thereof), Bronze Bird Inkstones were traded as gifts among the literati. The receiving party would write poems expressing their gratitude and essays appraising the artifact, sometimes inscribing the words onto the inkstone itself. This led to a large body of Song dynasty poetry on the topic of Bronze Bird Inkstones, treating the tiles as synecdoches through which the poet could recall the lost city of Ye and its lord Cao Cao. As the sympathies of the time laid with Cao Wei's enemy Shu Han, Cao Cao was portrayed negatively and criticized harshly in these writings. Some of these writings criticize the inkstones' collectors as dilettantes for being concerned with owning a piece of history at the price of forgetting history, and held the inkstones in disdain for their association with Cao Cao — as one indignant Yuan dynasty poet Ai Xingfu (艾性夫) puts it: "I request you sir, spit on it, throw it out, and never use it again. If the Bronze Bird [Terrace] still stood, I would destroy it."

== In fiction ==
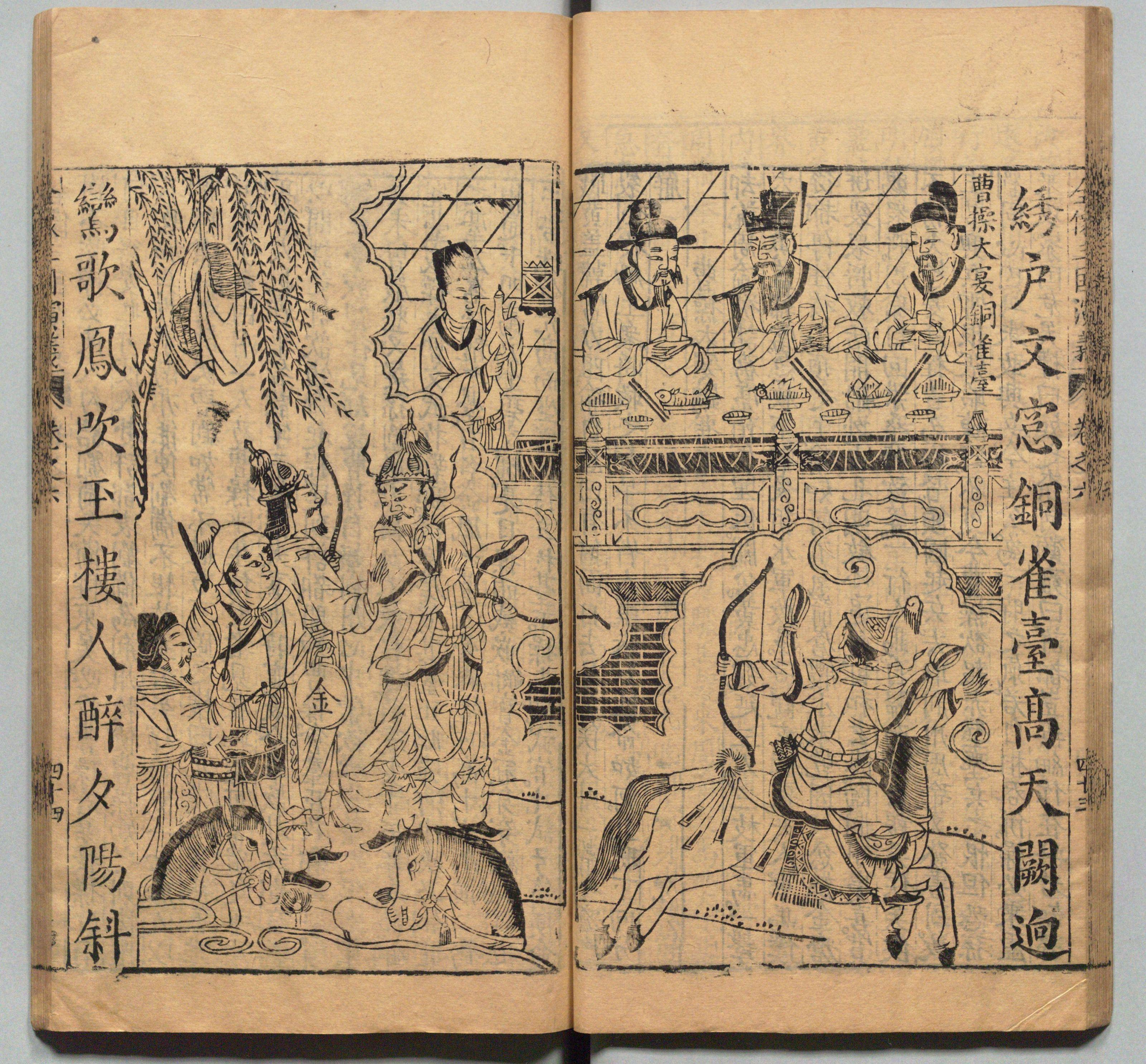
Cao Cao holds a feast on the Bronze Bird Terrace, in chapter 56 of the illustrated 1591 edition of the Romance of the Three Kingdoms novel

By the Yuan dynasty, a popular tradition took hold viewing Cao Cao as a lustful tyrant and his Bronze Bird Terrace a pleasure palace. The huaben Sanguozhi Pinghua ("Records of the Three Kingdoms in Plain Language") elaborates on the connection Du Mu made between Cao Cao and the Qiao sisters: In the prelude to the Battle of Red Cliffs, Zhuge Liang goads Zhou Yu into war against Cao Cao by stating that Cao Cao is specifically campaigning throughout China in search of beautiful women to fill his Bronze Bird Terrace, and if Zhou Yu fails to act, his own wife—the younger of the Qiao sisters—would be made captive there. Also of note is that the Bronze Bird Terrace was described to be in Chang'an instead of Ye in this story.

The Ming dynasty novel Romance of the Three Kingdoms attributed to 14th century writer Luo Guanzhong blends historical, literary, and popular traditions into a single narrative. In chapter 34 of the novel, a glowing bronze bird was dug out of the ground after Cao Cao's conquest of north China, which Cao Cao's advisor Xun You interprets as an auspicious portent harking back to the ancient sage kings. Pleased by the sign, Cao Cao charges Cao Zhi with the construction of the Bronze Bird Terrace in Ye, flanked by two shorter ones called Jade Dragon and Gold Phoenix. In chapter 44, Cao Zhi's poem Ascending the Terrace is woven into the narrative where Zhuge Liang goads Zhou Yu—an altered version of the poem with added verses is recited (under line 10 above), "proving" Cao Cao's lecherous intentions:

立雙臺於左右兮
有玉龍與金鳳
攬二喬於東南兮
樂朝夕之與共
俯皇都之宏麗兮
瞰雲霞之浮動
欣群才之來萃兮
協飛熊之吉夢

Translation:

The two towers rise, one on either flank,
This named Golden Phoenix, that Jade Dragon.
He would have the two Qiaos, these beautiful ladies of Wu,
That he might rejoice with them morning and evening.
Look down; there is the grand beauty of an imperial city,
And the rolling vapors lie floating beneath.
He will rejoice in the multitude of scholars that assemble,
Answering to the felicitous dream of King Wen.

— translated by C.H. Brewitt-Taylor

As a result, an enraged Zhou Yu vows to go to war with Cao Cao and defeats him in the Battle of Red Cliffs in 208. Historically, the battle predates the terrace by two years, and Cao Zhi's poem was written two years after Zhou Yu's death. Nonetheless, the story of the Bronze Bird Terrace and the Qiao sisters in the popular tradition aroused people's imagination for generations.

Other than the reference to the Qiao sisters, the writer of the novel resists fully committing to the vernacular trope of Bronze Bird Terrace being Cao Cao's harem. In chapter 56 on the completion of the Bronze Bird Terrace, Cao Cao holds a grand feast there, but the descriptions of Cao Cao's merrymaking there were confined to more elegant displays of poetry recitals and martial feats, not the carnal pleasures of the popular tradition.

In modern times, the Bronze Bird Terrace remains a staple in Three Kingdoms media associated with Cao Cao from historical dramas to video games. Notably, the Bronze Bird Terrace lends its name and setting to the 2012 Chinese film The Assassins (Chinese: 铜雀台; trans. "Bronze Bird Terrace"), which depicts fictional attempts on Cao Cao's life in the eponymous terrace.
