= Wu Family Shrines =

Archaeological site in Shandong, China

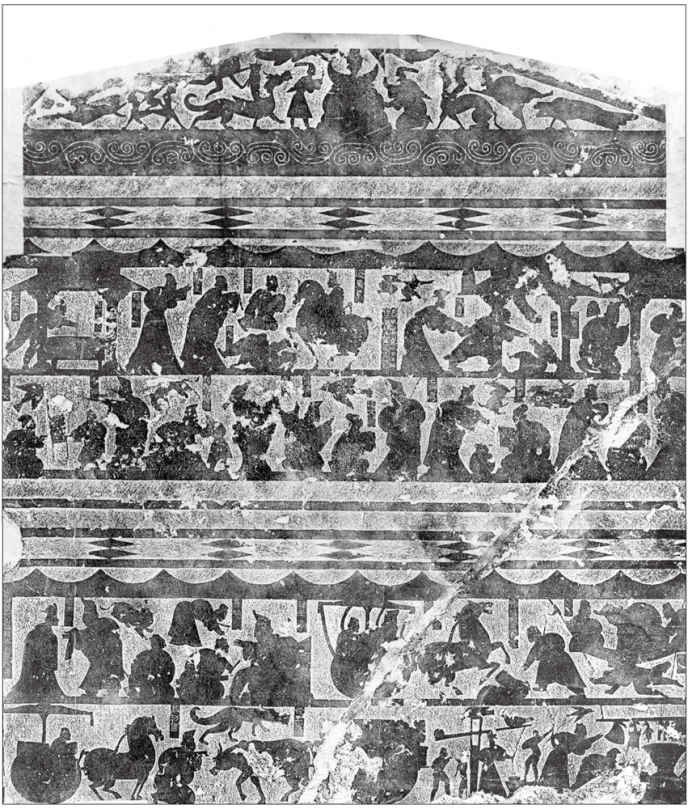
Stone-relief from east wall.

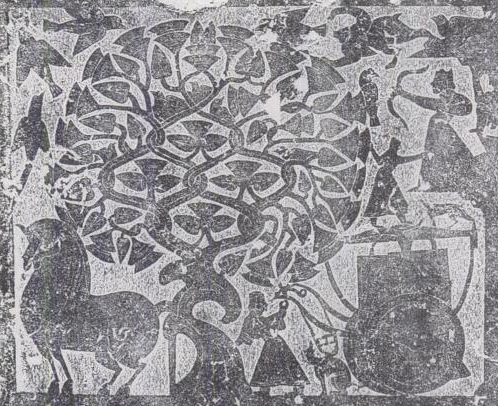
Rubbing of a detail from the Wu family shrines' stone relief carvings. The scene depicts the Fusang tree, Xihe who is going to hitch her Dragon Horse to the Sun Chariot, and Archer Yi who takes aim at the Sun Crows.

The Wu Family Shrines (Chinese: 武氏祠), of which the Wu Liang Shrine (武梁祠) is the best known, was the family shrine of the Wu clan of the Eastern Han dynasty. The shrines contain a vast amount of relief carvings.

Three walls of Wu Liang's shrine were still standing as late as the 11th century, which is the reason that the site of all the family shrines are often called after him. The shrine to Wu Liang (78-151 AD) was built in 151 AD in what is now Jiaxiang County of southwestern Shandong province.

In the 1930s, Wilma Fairbank visited the site and advanced the study of the tombs by treating the relief carvings as architectural wholes rather than pictorial art.

== See also ==
- Revenge of the Seven Daughters
